= Jahnke =

Jahnke is a German surname meaning "kin of John" or "kin of Johann". Notable people with the surname include:

- Bob Jahnke, New Zealand artist and educator
- Cat Jahnke, Canadian singer-songwriter
- Eugen Jahnke (1863–1921), German mathematician
- Franklin M. Jahnke, American politician
- Gerburg Jahnke (born 1955), German comedian
- Hugo Jahnke (1886–1939), Swedish gymnast
- Huia Jahnke, New Zealand academic
- Kurt Jahnke (1882–1945), German-American intelligence agent and saboteur
- Minnie Jahnke, American jeweler
- Paul Jahnke, German leftwing political activist who became a resistance activist against the Nazis
- Ryan Jahnke (born 1978), American figure skater

== See also ==
- Jahnke, Richmond, Virginia, a neighborhood in Richmond, Virginia, United States
