= Bridgette Masters-Awatere =

New Zealand psychology professor

Academic background
- Education: University of Waikato, Auckland Girls' Grammar School
- Thesis: "That's the price we pay": Kaupapa Māori Programme stakeholder experiences of external evaluation (2015)
- Doctoral advisor: Neville Robertson, Linda Waimarie Nikora

Bridgette Masters-Awatere is a New Zealand academic and practising psychologist. She is a full professor at the University of Waikato, specialising in Māori psychology and health.

== Early life and education ==
Masters-Awatere affiliates to Te Rarawa, Te Aupōuri, Tūwharetoa ki Kawerau, and Ngai te Rangi iwi. She was educated at Auckland Girls' Grammar School, where she was a member of the whānau group Ngā Tūmanako o Kahurangi. Masters-Awatere originally planned to study Māori language and art history, but after attending a lecture by Moana Jackson she became interested in psychology. Masters-Awatere trained as a community psychologist and worked in private practice before continuing her studies. Masters-Awatere completed a PhD titled "That's the price we pay": Kaupapa Māori Programme stakeholder experiences of external evaluation at the University of Waikato. Her research was supervised by Linda Waimarie Nikora and Neville Robertson.

== Academic career ==
Masters-Awatere joined the faculty of the University of Waikato, rising to full professor in 2024. Since 2019, she has been director of the Māori and Psychology Research Unit, and leads the only New Zealand Psychologists Board-accredited community psychology training programme for professional practice.

Master-Awatere served as the Director of Professional Development and Training for the New Zealand Psychological Society. She is part of the New Zealand Policy Research Institute's research team on Low Literacy & Numeracy, funded by an MBIE Endeavour Grant. Masters-Awatere also contributes to the Ngā Pae o Te Māramatanga Centre of Research Excellence, which aims to use research to address real world challenges facing Māori. She is also a part of the Deep South National Science Challenge, which focuses on understanding and adapting to climate change.

Masters-Awatere's research focuses on values-based research to address issues resulting from inequity in health and psychology. She has worked on the experiences of low-vision Māori during the COVID-19 lockdowns, the inclusion of Mātauranga Māori in literacy and numeracy education, and how health, wellbeing and the environment are connected.

== Honours and awards ==
Masters-Awatere is a Fellow of the New Zealand Psychological Society.

== Selected works ==
- Graham, Rebekah; Bridgette Masters-Awatere (2020). "Experiences of Māori of Aotearoa New Zealand's public health system: a systematic review of two decades of published qualitative research". Australian and New Zealand Journal of Public Health. doi:10.1111/1753-6405.12971. PMID 32311187. Wikidata Q92080059.
- Oetzel, John G.; Scott, Nina; Hudson, Maui; Bridgette Masters-Awatere; Rarere, Moana Malissa Adalene; Jeff Foote; Beaton, Angela; Terry Ehau (2017). "Implementation framework for chronic disease intervention effectiveness in Māori and other indigenous communities". Globalization and Health. 13 (1): 69. doi:10.1186/s12992-017-0295-8. PMC 5584010. PMID 28870225. Wikidata Q41611171.
- Darrin Hodgetts; Bridgette Masters; Robertson, Neville (2004). "Media coverage of 'decades of disparity' in ethnic mortality in Aotearoa". Journal of Community and Applied Social Psychology. 14 (6): 455–472. doi:10.1002/casp.792. Wikidata Q125756928.
- Nikora, Linda Waimarie; Bridgette Masters-Awatere; Awekotuku, Ngahuia (2012). "Final Arrangements Following Death: Maori Indigenous Decision Making and Tangi". Journal of Community and Applied Social Psychology. 22 (5): 400–413. doi:10.1002/casp.2112. Wikidata Q58405304.
- Robertson, Neville; Bridgette Masters-Awatere, Community Psychology in Aotearoa/New Zealand: Me Tiro Whakamuri a- Kia- Hangai Whakamua, pp. 140–163, doi:10.1007/978-0-387-49500-2_7, Wikidata Q125756926
- Teng, Andrea; Blakely, Tony; Scott, Nina; Jansen, Rawiri; Bridgette Masters-Awatere; Krebs, Jeremy; Oetzel, John G. (2019). "What protects against pre-diabetes progressing to diabetes? Observational study of integrated health and social data". Diabetes Research and Clinical Practice. 148: 119–129. doi:10.1016/j.diabres.2018.12.003. PMID 30633935. Wikidata Q91003374.
- Rua, Mohi; Shiloh Groot; Darrin Hodgetts; Nikora, Linda Waimarie; Bridgette Masters-Awatere; Pita King; Rolinda Karapu; Robertson, Neville (2021), Decoloniality in Being Māori and Community Psychologists: Advancing an Evolving and Culturally-Situated Approach, pp. 177–191, doi:10.1007/978-3-030-72220-3_10, Wikidata Q125756916
