= Tūroa Royal =

New Zealand Māori educationist (1935–2023)

Tūroa Royal CNZM QSO ED
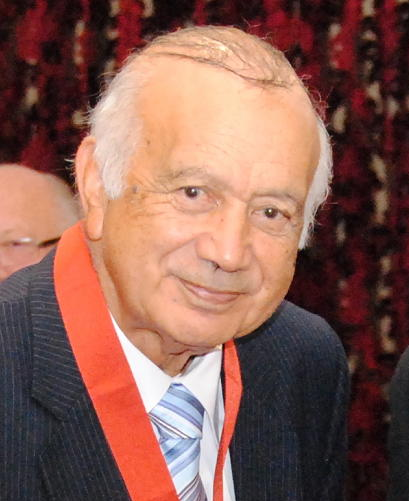
- Royal in 2013
- Born: 28 January 1935; Waimangō, Hauraki, New Zealand
- Died: 29 November 2023 (aged 88); Auckland, New Zealand
- Occupations: Academic leader and educationist

Academic background
- Education: University of Auckland & University of New England, Australia

Academic work
- Notable works: Key advocate during the 1960s-1980s for introducing Māori language and culture into New Zealand education. Introduced the ‘whānau system’ into Wellington High School in the early 1980s. Heavily involved in the establishment of Te Wānanga o Raukawa Foundation Director of Whitireia Polytechnic, Porirua A founder of the World Indigenous Higher Education Consortium

Tūroa Kiniwe Royal CNZM QSO ED (28 January 1935 – 29 November 2023) was a New Zealand Māori educationist.

Born in 1935, Royal dedicated his long career to improving Māori educational achievement and was involved in numerous innovations in New Zealand education utilising aspects of Māori culture, language and ideas. He was a teacher at Tāmaki College, Auckland, a Department of Education Inspector of Māori and Island Education, and principal of Wellington High School for eight years. Educational institutes he was part of founding are Whitireia Polytechnic in Porirua north of Wellington and Te Wānanga-o-Raukawa in Ōtaki. He was also heavily involved in the establishment of the World Indigenous Nations Higher Education Consortium.

== Early life ==
Tūroa Royal was born on 28 January 1935, at Waimangō Point, on the Firth of Thames, just north of Kaiaua. His parents were Robert Haunui Tukumana Royal of Ngāti Whanaunga, Ngāti Tamaterā and Ngāti Raukawa. His mother was Meri Te Oi Tamehana of Ngāpuhi and Ngāti Hine.

One of Royal’s siblings was Wiremu Taurau Royal, the first registered Māori architect.

Royal grew up on the family farm, a remnant block within the lands of his Ngāti Whanaunga people. The block was first converted into a farm by his paternal adopted grandfather, Tukumana Te Taniwha of Ngāti Whanaunga and later by his father Haunui.

== Tribal (Iwi) affiliations ==
Through his father, Royal belonged to the iwi (tribes) of Ngāti Whanaunga and Ngāti Tamaterā of the Hauraki region and Ngāti Raukawa of the Horowhenua region, near Wellington. His family name, Royal or Te Roera, comes from Ngāti Raukawa.

On his mother’s side, Royal belonged to Ngāpuhi and Ngāti Hine. His maternal grandfather was Te Oi Tamehana of Ngāti Kōpaki, Ngāti Hine. His maternal grandmother was Hana Toi of the Ngāti Korokoro and Ngāti Whārara peoples of Ōmāpere, Hokianga.

As Royal was born and raised at Waimangō, Firth of Thames, within the lands of Ngāti Whanaunga, this was his primary tribal affiliation. His family continue to maintain ‘ahi kā’ (home fires) at Waimangō and many of Royal’s immediate family members (including his parents and some of his siblings) are interred in the family cemetery at Waimangō.

== Education ==
Royal attended Kaiaua Primary School (commencing in 1940) and enjoyed some academic success there. According to a 1949 article published in the Gisborne Herald Royal was one of the top seven candidates nationally for the Ngārimu VC Memorial Fund Award having attained 197 marks of a possible 300. The article states:

It is still necessary to indicate… that the competition for scholarship awards is open annually to children of Maori blood attending school whatever, and not merely to pupils of Maori schools. This angle of the competition is pointed up by the fact that while most of the leading candidates were Maori school pupils, one well recommended boy is receiving his education at the Kaiaua Public School.’

Following Kaiaua School, Royal then attended Wesley College, near Pukekohe. Encouraged by his mother’s brother, Rev Māori Marsden, Royal enrolled at the University of Auckland in 1954. He studied Education, Anthropology and Māori Studies and completed a Bachelor of Arts on 6 May 1960. (He also took papers in History, Italian and English). Royal later completed a Master of Arts in Geography on 3 May 1968. His dissertation was entitled The Phosphate Manufacturing Industry in New Zealand.

In 1975, Royal completed a Master of Education Administration (M.EdAdmin) at the University of New England, Armidale, New South Wales, Australia. His dissertation was titled Culture change and education administration in New Zealand: administrative implications in introducing Māori language and Māori culture into secondary schools in New Zealand. While offering a tribute to Royal, Māori educationalist Dr Kathie Irwin stated that:

Turoa Royal’s 1975 masters thesis on the implications of introducing Māori language and culture into secondary schools should be required reading today for people opposed to the spread of te reo Māori.

== Career ==
Royal spent his career seeking ways of uplifting Māori educational achievement at all levels of schooling and tertiary education. He also sought to enrich and improve general New Zealand schooling through using aspects of Māori language and culture. While Royal was never proficient in the Māori language (he was a member of the first generation of his family who were not raised as native speakers), he understood early how empowering Māori language learning can be for Māori students and how enriching it can be for those who are not Māori.

In 1959, Royal published an article in the Te Ao Hou magazine entitled A Māori Child Grows up in Auckland. The article provides an overview of primary, secondary and tertiary education as it relates to Māori in Auckland at the time. Royal expresses a number of views that would become key themes in his subsequent career.

In 1968, Royal contributed to a Race Relations Seminar at the University of Waikato where it was reported that he said:

...There is an urgent need to advance Maori education sufficiently to prevent the development of an unemployable proletariat... The nation cannot afford to waste any of the ability of its children, and we should develop the most untapped professional talent of the Maori people for the benefit of all." He went on to say, "If other races are setting about the task of integrating and adapting to the needs of modern society, the Maori should certainly not lag behind... As part of the New Zealand population, and indeed a growing proportion playing an important part in the economy, the Maori has right to all the facilities in which he can grow and reach his full intellectual capacity.

The use of Māori language and culture was an important dimension of his approach to Māori education and he was critical of ‘mono-cultural bias’ in schooling.

During the 1960s, he taught at Tāmaki College, Auckland and from 1970 to 1978, he was an Inspector of Māori and Island Education, for the then Department of Education of the New Zealand Government.

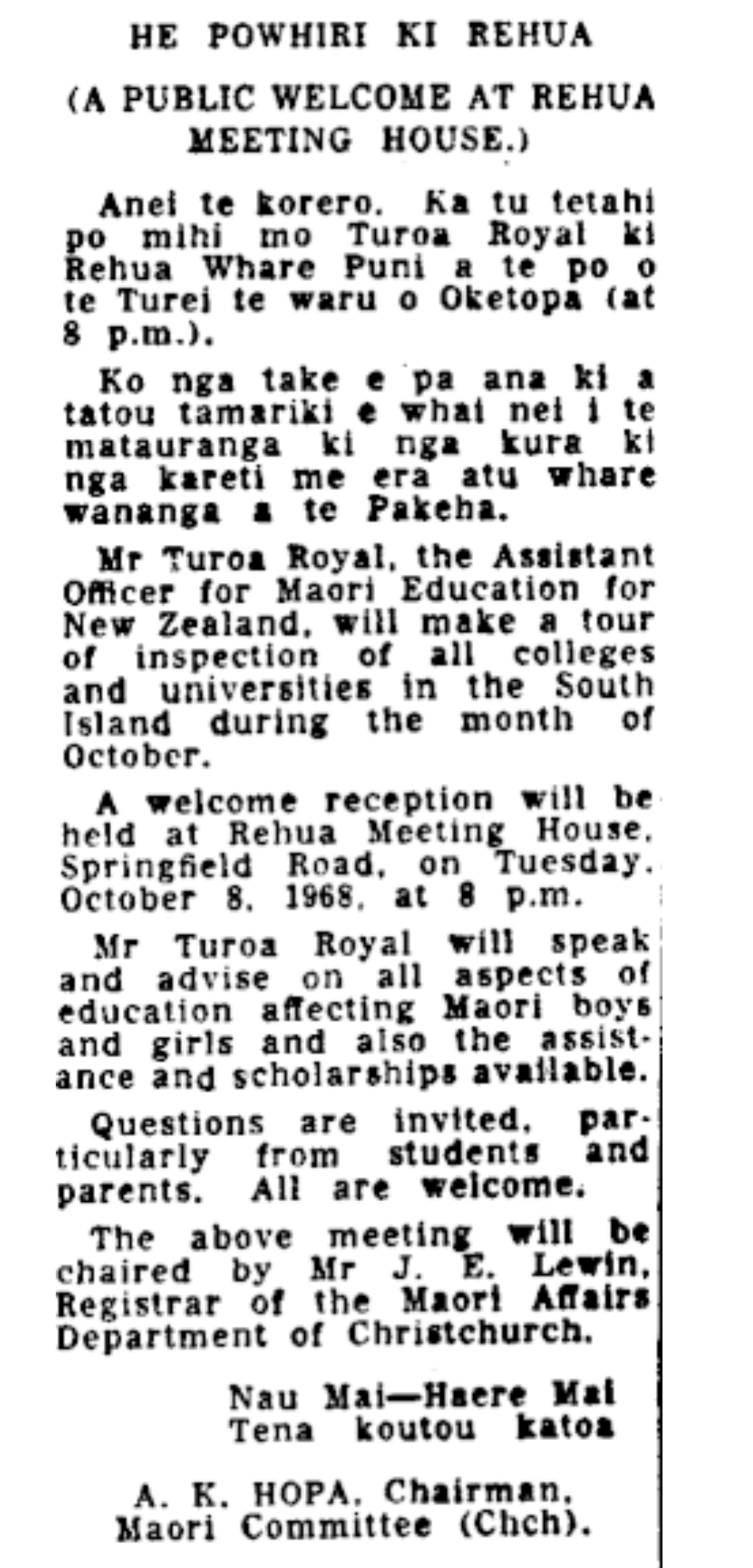
A public notice concerning a visit by Tūroa Royal to Rehua Marae, Christchurch 1968

From 1978 to 1986 he was Principal of Wellington High School and from 1986 to 1996 he was Foundation Director of Whitireia Polytechnic, Porirua. In 1980, Royal introduced bilingual and whānau based schooling into Wellington High School, one of the first schools in New Zealand to do so.

From 1981 to 2011, Royal was heavily involved in the establishment of Te Wānanga-o-Raukawa in Ōtaki. He undertook numerous roles during its establishment phase including governance, management and teaching roles.

Writing in Ka Whawhai tonu matou: Struggle without End Ranginui Walker explains that Royal attended a major hui (gathering) at Tūrangawaewae Marae, Ngāruawāhia, (the seat of the Māori King Movement) in September 1984. This gathering was convened by Te Rūnanga Whakawhanaunga i Ngā Hāhi and concerned a host of topics and issues of importance to Māori leadership at the time. One of those topics concerned the jurisdiction of the Waitangi Tribunal. Ranginui Walker explains that Royal had a hand in extending the jurisdiction of the Tribunal back to 1840. He writes:

In the workshop on the Waitangi Tribunal, the resource person gave the background history leading up to the tribunal's establishment... It was put to the workshop that in the nine years since the tribunal came into being, events such as the land march, the occupation of disputed lands at Bastion Point and Raglan, protest marches and the Hikoi to Waitangi had raised the level of national consciousness to such an extent that perhaps the public would now accept a recommendation to make the tribunal retrospective to 1900. But just as a motion to that effect was put to the workshop, the chairman, Turoa Royal, asked forlornly where such a motion left the issue of Thames and Coromandel goldfields. The resource person replied 'Turoa, since your goldfield claim occurred in 1867, and if you want to take it to the tribunal, then you had better move an amendment to the motion to make it retrospective to 1840.' The amendment was moved... Thus it was quite serendipitously that the motion for retrospective powers was arrived at. (Ranginui Walker 2004)

Royal was a founder of the World Indigenous Higher Education Consortium (WINHEC). Between 2002 and 2008 he was Chairperson of the Consortium.

== Service ==
Royal served on numerous boards and committees throughout his career often voluntarily and without remuneration.

In 1973, he served on a ‘Maori Programmes Advisory Committee’ for the then New Zealand Broadcasting Corporation alongside other significant Māori leaders such as Mira Szaszy and (later Sir) Robert Mahuta. The role of the committee was to ‘…advise the corporation on matters relating to programmes for Maori people and on subjects relating to programmes about Maori people and culture to the whole audience.’

From 1973 to 1978, Royal served as a member of the Polynesian Advisory Committee of the Vocational Training Council and became Chair of the Wellington Consultative Committee on Polynesians in Employment. Additionally, he was a member of the National Committee on Polynesians in Employment.

Royal served as a member of the Pāpāwai Kaikōkirikiri Trusts Board from 1982 to 2004, this board looks after lands in the Wairarapa and runs outreach programmes and education scholarships. During this time, he also served as member of the Ōtaki Porirua Trusts Board.

Royal was a member of The Māori Tertiary Reference Group which produced in 2003, a ‘Māori Tertiary Education Framework’. The Reference Group was chaired by Professor Linda Tuhiwai Smith.

Other boards and committees Royal served on included Capital and Coast District Health Board, the JR McKenzie Trust, the NZUSA Education Foundation and Te Tauihu o ngā Wānanga, the Association of Wānanga.

== Personal life and death ==
Royal married Maryrose Wells in 1959. They had six sons, including Te Ahukaramū Charles Royal.

Tūroa Royal in Auckland on 29 November 2023, at the age of 88. He was mourned first at Raukawa Marae, Ōtaki, before being returned to his ancestral home of Waimangō, western Hauraki. He was interred in the family cemetery there on 4 December.

Following his death, Dr. Kathie Irwin offered the following tribute:

“I think also one of the beautiful things our students still talk about to this day is his dedication to humanity. He was a wonderful human being. What he brought to his work was more than his intellect, it was his heart, it was his soul, it was his whakapapa. He was always saying to me: ‘what about the mokopuna, what about the rangatahi?'”

== Awards and honours ==
In 1974, Royal was awarded a Kelloggs Foundation grant to study education administration at the University of New England, Armidale, New South Wales, Australia. He used this award to complete a Masters of Education Administration at that university in 1975.

In 2005, Royal was recognised by being made a Companion of the Queen’s Service Order (QSO).

In 2009, Royal was awarded an Honorary Doctorate of Literature by Massey University, Palmerston North. The citation awarding the Honorary Doctorate to Royal acknowledged his commitment to Māori education sustained over more than 50 years. It was read by Professor Arohia Durie and includes the following statement:

Many New Zealanders have made substantial contributions to education but relatively few have sustained active leadership in the field for more than fifty years. As early as 1956 as an undergraduate student at Auckland University, Mr. Royal was one of a small number of Maori students who argued that Maori language should be a curriculum subject for teacher trainees. He had by then already embarked on a career that would ultimately facilitate the transformation of New Zealand’s approach to education. By identifying language, culture, and community voice as determinants of successful learning, he was instrumental in building a pathway for educational inclusion that was entirely consistent with the nation’s increasingly diverse population.

In the 2013 New Year Honours he was made a Companion of the New Zealand Order of Merit. He received his insignia from Governor General Sir Jerry Mateparae on 23 May 2013.

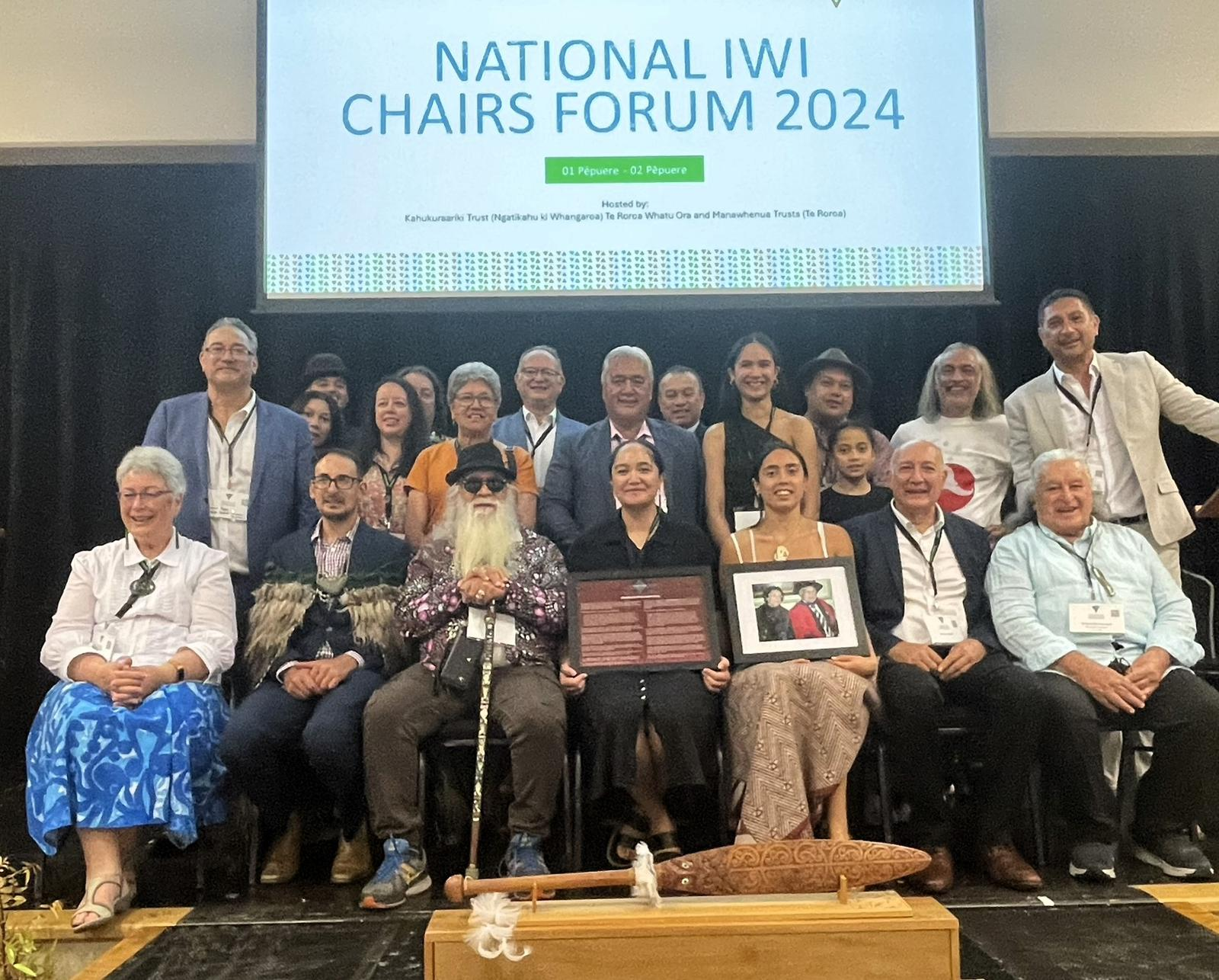
Members of Tūroa Royal's family together with representatives of the Iwi Chair's Forum and Ngāpuhi, Kerikeri, Bay of Islands, 1 February 2024

On Thursday, the 1st of February 2024, Royal was honoured by the National Iwi Chair’s Forum by being posthumously awarded the ‘Whare Pūkenga’ award. This was done in recognition of Royal’s:

… significant contributions to the Nation in education, and in his advocacy for Māori in education and cultural development.

Regarding the award itself, the Forum explains as follows:

Te Whare Pūkenga was established by the Iwi Chairs Forum in 2021 to recognise rangatira who have enhanced the lives of all whānau in Aotearoa through their activities. Specifically the award is given to those whose actions contribute significantly to the revitalisation of the Forum’s values including: Rangatiratanga, Whanaungatanga, Manaakitanga, Kaitiakitanga, Tikanga and Pono. Te Whare Pūkenga is an honour that was conceived by, is managed by, and is completely funded by the Iwi that make up the National Iwi Chairs Forum.

Royal was nominated for the award by his mother’s people of Ngāpuhi.

== Writings ==
See 'Komako: A Bibliography of Writing by Māori in English' for a comprehensive list of writings by Tūroa Royal.

'The Maori Child Grows up in Auckland' in Te Ao Hou, June 1959

The World Indigenous Nations Higher Education Consortium WINHEC in WINHEC: International Journal of Indigenous Education Scholarship
