= Annemarie Gillies =

Professor of Māori research in New Zealand

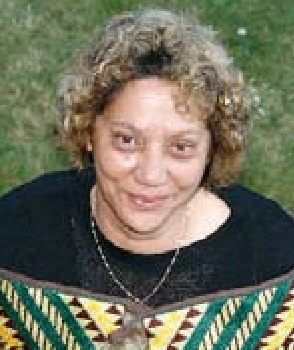
- Gillies in 2007

Academic background
- Education: Massey University
- Thesis: Kia taupunga te ngā kau Māori: anchoring Māori health workforce potential (2006)
- Doctoral advisor: Mason Durie

Annemarie Gillies is a New Zealand Māori academic, and is Professor of Māori Research at the Eastern Institute of Technology in Hawke's Bay. She was formerly a professor at Massey University.

== Academic career ==
Gillies is Māori, and affiliates to Ngāti Kahungunu, Ngāti Awa, Te Whanau-a-Apanui and Te Arawa iwi. She worked in the freezing works at Whakatu until they were closed in 1986, and then studied business administration at the Eastern Institute of Technology (EIT). She worked first in accounts, and later completed a National Certificate of Business Studies. Gillies went on to gain a Bachelor of Business Studies majoring in Accountancy from Massey University. She then managed the Te Pūmanawa Hauora Māori Health Research Programme at Massey. In 2006, Gillies completed a PhD titled Kia taupunga te ngā kau Māori: anchoring Māori health workforce potential at Massey University, supervised by Mason Durie. Gillies was Director of Te Au Rangahau, the Māori Business Research Centre at Massey, and lectured in the School of Management.

Gillies was appointed Professor of Māori and Indigenous Research at Te Whare Wananga o Awanuiārangi in Whakatāne. She then worked as the research director at health provider Te Puna Ora o Mataatua. In 2020 Gillies took a role as Pouarahi Rārangi Kōrero (Māori Heritage Listing Advisor) at Heritage New Zealand, where she helped whānau, hapū and iwi to research and write up their histories. She retained this role on a part time basis when appointed as Professor of Rangahau Māori (Māori Research) at EIT. With David Tipene-Leach, she is co-director of the Māori research centre Te Kura i Awarua, at the Hawke’s Bay Campus of EIT.

Gillies is part of the Ngā Pae o Te Māramatanga Centre of Research Excellence where she is researching Māori governance structures, and part of the Indigenising the blue economy project in the Sustainable Seas National Science Challenge. She is a member of the Aotearoa Research Ethics Committee, a national independent ethics committee for community-based research.

== Selected works ==
- Gillies, Annemarie (2006). Kia taupunga te ngā kau Māori : anchoring Māori health workforce potential (Doctor of Philosophy thesis). Massey University. hdl:10179/994. Wikidata Q112868123.
- Huia Tomlins Jahnke; Gillies, Annemarie (2012). "Indigenous Innovations in Qualitative Research Method: Investigating the Private World of Family Life". International Journal of Qualitative Methods. 11 (4): 498–512. doi:10.1177/160940691201100412. Wikidata Q126107226.
- Christine Stephens; Gillies, Annemarie (2011). "Understanding the Role of Everyday Practices of Privilege in the Perpetuation of Inequalities". Journal of Community and Applied Social Psychology. 22 (2): 145–158. doi:10.1002/casp.1107. Wikidata Q126107228.
- Rāwiri Tinirau; Gillies, Annemarie; Rachael Tinirau (2011). "Hōmai Tō Hono: Connecting customary, conventional and spiritual healing practices within a rural-based Māori community". AlterNative. 7 (2): 163–176. doi:10.1177/117718011100700208. Wikidata Q126107229.
- Mika, Jason Paul; Smith, Graham; Gillies, Annemarie; Fiona Wiremu (2019). "Unfolding tensions within post-settlement governance and tribal economies in Aotearoa New Zealand". Journal of Enterprising Communities. 13 (3): 296–318. doi:10.1108/jec-12-2018-0104. Wikidata Q126107580.
- Durie, Mason Harold; Gillies, Annemarie; Te Kani Kingi; Mihi Ratima; John A. Waldon; Philip Morrison; G.R. Allan (June 1995), Guidelines for purchasing personal mental health services for Māori: a report prepared for the Ministry of Health, Massey University, Wikidata Q126108794
