= Part-time student =

Non-traditional student

A part-time student is a non-traditional student who pursues higher education, but will attend fewer class hours per semester than a full-time student, taking more years to complete their qualification; this is typically done after reaching adulthood, while living off-campus, and will often be done while carrying out responsibilities related to family and/or employment.

Part-time student status is based on taking fewer course credits in a semester than full-time students. Part-time students may choose to pursue part-time studies for a variety of different reasons. A benefit of pursuing higher education as a part-time student is the opportunity to be able to balance learning with work, family and other personal commitments. Not every program will have the option for part-time students to enroll. The selection of programs that are available in a part-time format will vary depending on the institution.

There is a lack of existing research that examines the experiences of part-time students in a higher education setting. However, it is known that when compared to full-time students, part-time students often feel less engaged, and as a result, part-time students have much higher attrition rates. It is recommended that peer support networks that support part-time students are implemented at institutions as a way to increase students' engagement with the program of study, decrease feelings of isolation, and increase participation.

== Australia ==
In Australia, 31.2 percent of students in 2008 were enrolled part-time. Between 2003 and 2008, while the number of students attending full time increased by 21.1 percent, the number attending part-time enrollments increased by only 2.5 percent.

In 2022, there were over 10,000 part-time students in Australia, compared to over 4 million full-time students.

== Canada ==
At Canadian higher education institutions, there are numerous undergraduate and graduate degrees, as well as diplomas, that are available on a part-time basis. Students in Canada may choose to pursue part-time studies for many different reasons. The reasons for choosing to pursue studies as a part-time student may include furthering one's education, advancing in a career, professional development, or simply the decision to pivot one's current life direction. In the year 2019, there were about 266,000 part-time students in Canada.

=== Definition by institution ===
In Canada, the course load that constitutes part-time student status varies between institutions. The University of British Columbia, for example, defines a part-time undergraduate student as one enrolled in less than 80 percent of the standard 30 credit-hour course load. The University of Manitoba defines the part-time undergraduate student as an individual enrolled in less than 60 percent of the standard full 30 credit hour course load. Wilfrid Laurier University in Ontario defines a part-time student as a student who is currently taking less than three half-credit courses in a semester.

=== Funding ===
The Government of Canada national student loans program defines a part-time student as one who is enrolled in 20–59 percent of a full course load. http://www.canlearn.ca/en/Multimedia/nslsc/pdf/guides/CAN_PT_EN.pdf The Government of Canada offers funding to part-time students in the form of student grants and loans. The amount of funding that you are able to receive depends on many factors, including which province or territory you reside in, what your household income is, whether or not you have dependents, whether or not you identify as having a disability, and what your current tuition fees and living expenses are.

== United Kingdom ==
In the United Kingdom, while full-time students have been increasing, part-time student enrolment has been steady decreasing since 2009–2010. In 2011–2012, 31 percent of all enrolments were part-time, while in 2015–2016 part-time students consisted of 24 percent of all enrolments. Between 2011–2012 and 2015–2016 there was an overall 30 percent decrease of part-time students.

In 2022-2023, there were 784,000 undergraduate students; of these, 140,000 were part-time students. In 2024-2025, there were 536,000 postgraduate students, and almost 240,000 of these were studying part-time.

=== Occasional student ===
Postgrads and some mature students may enrol in some centres as occasional students. This includes international students registered for a PhD in their own country, and scholars working professsionaly in the field of study.

== United States ==
In the United States, the number of part-time students rose 16 percent between 2004 and 2014. In 2015, 23 percent of undergraduate students at 4-year institutions attended part-time, compared to 61 percent of students at 2-year institutions.

In 2022-2023, 11.5 million students attended higher education full time, while 7.4 million attended part time.

== See also ==
- Adult student
- Non-traditional student
- Full-time equivalent

== Additional citations ==
- Andres, L., & Carpenter, S. (1997). Today's higher education students: Issues of admission, retention, transfer, and attrition in relation to changing student demographics. Centre for Policy Studies in Education University of British Columbia. Retrieved October 12, 2007 from:http://www.bccat.bc.ca/pubs/today.pdf
- Billett, S. (1998). Ontogeny and participation in communities of practice: A socio-cognitive view of adult development. Studies in the Education of Adults, 30(1), 21. Retrieved September 15, 2008 from the Academic Search Elite database.
- Campbell, D. (1984). The new majority: Adult Learners in the University. Edmonton: The University of Alberta Press.
- Holt, N. (2003) Representation, Legitimation, and Autoethnography: An Autoethnographic Writing Story. International Journal of Qualitative Methods, 2 (1) Retrieved September 18, 2008 from https://www.ualberta.ca/~iiqm/backissues/2_1/pdf/holt.pdf
- Kozulin, A. (2004). Vygotsky's theory in the classroom: Introduction. European Journal of Psychology of Education - EJPE, 19(1), 3-7. Retrieved September 15, 2008 from the Academic Search Elite database.
- Kroth, M. (2000). Life Mission and Adult Learning. Adult Education Quarterly, 50 (2).
- McDonough, G. (2005). Moral maturity and autonomy: appreciating the significance of Lawrence Kolhberg's Just Community. Journal of Moral Education, 34(2), 199-213. Retrieved September 18, 2008 from the Academic Search Elite database.
- Merriam, S. B., Caffarella, R., S., & Baumgartner, L., M. (2007). Learning in adulthood" A comprehensive guide (3rd Edition). San Francisco : Jossey-Bass.
- Rennemark, M., & Hagberg, B. (1997). Sense of coherence among the elderly in relation to their perceived life history in an Eriksonian perspective. Aging & Mental Health, 1(3), 221-229. Retrieved September 18, 2008 from the Academic Search Elite database.
- Russell, C. (1999). Autoethnography: Journey of the Self. Experimental Ethnography. Retrieved September 18, 2008 from https://www.haussite.net/haus.0/SCRIPT/txt2001/01/russel.HTML
- Siegler, R., Ellis, S. (1996). Piaget on Childhood. Psychological Science, American Psychological Society, 7(4). Retrieved September 18, 2008 from the Academic Search Elite database.
- Stydinger, N., & Dundes, L. (Spring, 2006). Over the Hill? A Nontraditional Undergraduate Student's Uphill Battle. College Quarterly, 9(2). Retrieved September 16, 2007, from https://www.senecac.on.ca/quarterly/2006-vol09-num02-spring/stydinger_dundes.html
