= Linda Waimarie Nikora =

New Zealand psychology academic

Linda Waimarie Nikora FRSNZ
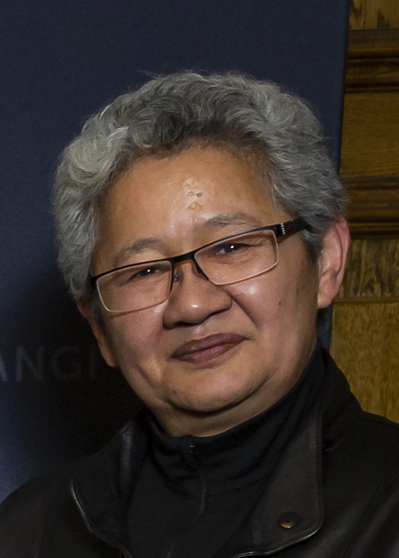
- At 2019 Research Honours Aotearoa
- Citizenship: Aoteroa New Zealand
- Education: University of Waikato
- Scientific career
- Fields: Indigenous, Community and Social psychology; Kaupapa Maori Psychology
- Workplaces: University of Waikato, University of Auckland
- Thesis: Māori social identities in New Zealand and Hawai'i
- Doctoral advisor: Professor James Ritchie Professor Jane Ritchie Emeritus Professor Ngahuia Te Awekotuku
- Doctoral students: Kiri Edge, Byron Seiuli, Saburo Omura, Kat Poi, Mihiterina Williams, Leticia Vizor, Panikaa Teeple, Zahra Cherrington-Irving

Linda Waimarie Nikora FRSNZ is a New Zealand Māori psychology academic. She is of Te Aitanga-a-Hauiti and Ngāi Tūhoe descent. She is currently professor of Indigenous Studies and was co-director of Ngā Pae o te Māramatanga at the University of Auckland until 2025, having moved in 2017 from the University of Waikato where she had been a professor of psychology and the founding director of the Maori & Psychology Research Unit in the School of Psychology.

Nikora attended Hukarere Girls' College in Napier, New Zealand, before moving to the University of Waikato for both her undergraduate and PhD work. Her 2007 PhD thesis was entitled Māori social identities in New Zealand and Hawai'i.

In 2018, Nikora was elected a Fellow of the Royal Society of New Zealand, and in 2021 she was awarded their Te Rangi Hiroa Medal.

Nikora's book, Mau Moko: The world of Māori tattoo, published in 2007, was listed in Books of Mana as one of the 180 most significant works of Māori-authored non-fiction.

Notable students of Nikora include Bridgette Masters-Awatere.

== Selected works ==
- Lapsley, Hilary, Linda Waimarie Nikora, and Rosanne Marjory Black. "Kia Mauri Tau!" Narratives of recovery from disabling mental health problems. Mental Health Commission, 2002.
- Hodgetts, Darrin, Ottilie Stolte, Christopher Sonn, Neil Drew, Stuart Carr, and Linda Waimarie Nikora. Social psychology and everyday life (2nd ed.). Macmillan Education, 2020.
- Jones, Bernadette, Paula Toko King, Gabrielle Baker, Linda Waimarie Nikora, Huhana Hickey, Meredith Perry, Rangi Pouwhare, and Tristram Richard Ingham. "Karanga rua, karanga maha: Māori with lived experience of disability self-determining their own identities." Kōtuitui: New Zealand Journal of Social Sciences Online, 19(1), 45–64, 2024.
- Loto, Robert, Darrin Hodgetts, Kerry Chamberlain, Linda Waimarie Nikora, Rolinda Karapu, and Alison Barnett. "Pasifika in the news: The portrayal of Pacific peoples in the New Zealand press." Journal of Community and Applied Social Psychology, 16(2), 100–118, 2006.
- Nikora, Linda Waimarie, Bridgette Masters‐Awatere, and Ngahuia Te Awekotuku. "Final arrangements following death: Maori indigenous decision making and tangi." Journal of Community & Applied Social Psychology, 22(5), 400–413, 2012.
- Ruru, Jacinta, and Linda Waimarie Nikora, eds. Ngā Kete Mātauranga: Māori scholars at the research interface. Otago University Press, 2021.
