= Charles Royal =

Charles Royal may refer to:

- Te Ahukaramū Charles Royal, New Zealand musician, academic, and Māori music revivalist
- Charles F. Royal (1880–1955), American screenwriter
