= Huia Jahnke =

New Zealand academic

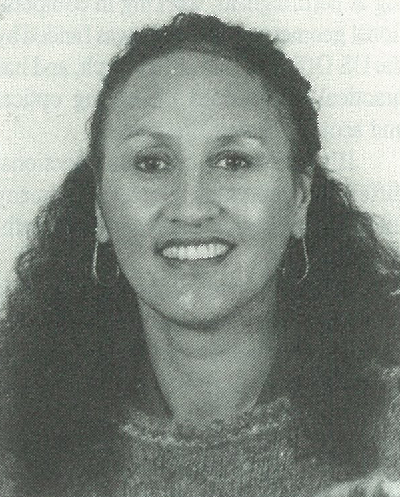
- Jahnke in 1991
- Education: Massey University
- Scientific career
- Fields: Indigenous education
- Workplaces: Massey University
- Thesis: He huarahi motuhake : the politics of tribal agency in provider services (2006)
- Website: Massey University profile

Huia Jahnke, sometimes known as Huia Tomlins-Jahnke, is a New Zealand academic. She is Māori, of Ngāti Kahungunu, Ngāti Toa Rangātira, Ngāi Tahu and Ngāti Hine descent and as of 2018 is a full professor of Māori and indigenous education at Massey University.

After a master's degree in education and a PhD at Massey University she joined the staff and rose to full professor and head of the school of education.

Jahnke's book, Mana Tangata: Politics of empowerment, published in 2011, was listed in Books of Mana as one of the 180 most significant works of Māori-authored non-fiction.

Jahnke is married to Bob Jahnke, a professor in the art faculty at Massey.

== Selected works ==
- Tomlins-Jahnke, Huia, and Julia Taiapa. "Maori research." Social science research in New Zealand: Many paths to understanding (1999): 39–50.
- Tomlins-Jahnke, Huia. "Towards a secure identity: Maori women and the home-place." In Women's Studies International Forum, vol. 25, no. 5, pp. 503–513. Pergamon, 2002.
- Tomlins-Jahnke, Huia, and Annemarie Gillies. "Indigenous innovations in qualitative research method: Investigating the private world of family life." International Journal of Qualitative Methods 11, no. 4 (2012): 498–512.
- Tomlins-Jahnke, Huia. "Towards a theory of mana wahine." He Pukenga Korero 3, no. 1 (2013).
- Tomlins-Jahnke, Huia, "The place of cultural standards in indigenous education." MAI Review LW 1, no. 1 (2008): 11.
- Tomlins-Jahnke, Huia, and Mulholland, Malcolm (2011). Eds. Mana Tangata: Politics of Empowerment. Wellington: Huia.
