= Hilary Lapsley =

New Zealand author and social scientist

- Born: 1949; Auckland
- Other name: Hilary Haines
- Awards: New Zealand Suffrage Centennial Medal 1993

Academic background
- Education: University of Auckland
- Thesis: The origins of modern social psychology (1980)

Hilary Mary Lapsley (also Hilary Mary Haines; born 1949) is a New Zealand author, psychologist, and social studies academic specialising in gender studies. She was awarded a New Zealand Suffrage Centennial Medal in 1993, and the Judy Grahn Award for lesbian non-fiction in 2000.

== Early life and education ==
Lapsley was born in Auckland in 1949 to Robin and Sylvia Lapsley, a minister and a teacher respectively. Lapsley attended the University of Auckland, where she completed a Master of Arts with honours in 1979 followed by a PhD titled The origins of modern social psychology at the University of Auckland in 1980.

== Career ==
Lapsley worked as a research officer for the Mental Health Foundation of New Zealand, rising to deputy director, and then in 1988 was appointed as a lecturer in psychology at the University of Waikato. In 2001 she became a senior analyst at the Mental Health Commission of New Zealand. Most recently Lapsley was a senior researcher at the University of Auckland, and contributed to the Ageing Well National Science Challenge. Lapsley was a National Convenor of the Women's Studies Association, and as of October 2024 serves on the committee. Lapsley wrote a book on the professional and personal relationship between anthropologists Margaret Mead and Ruth Benedict, which was published by the University of Massachusetts Press in 2001.

== Personal life ==
Lapsley used to live on Waiheke Island, but bought into the Cohaus co-housing development in Grey Lynn with her partner Lois Cox. They divide their time between Auckland and Cox's home in Wellington. Lapsley and Cox have written three lesbian mystery novels together, under the pen name Jennifer Palgrave.

== Honours and awards ==
In 1992 Lapsley was awarded a Fulbright Scholarship, and in 1993 she was awarded a New Zealand Suffrage Centennial Medal. The medal was given to recognize those people who had made a significant contribution to women's rights or women's issues in New Zealand. She was awarded the Publishing Triangle Judy Grahn Award for lesbian non-fiction in 2000 for her book on Margaret Mead and Ruth Benedict.

== Selected works ==
=== Books ===
- Lapsley, Hilary (1987). Mental Health for Women. Auckland, New Zealand: Reed.
- Lapsley, Hilary (15 June 2001). Margaret Mead and Ruth Benedict: The Kinship of Women. University of Massachusetts Press. ISBN 978-1558492950.
- Palgrave, Jennifer (26 April 2020). The One That Got Away. Town Belt Press. ASIN B087Q6Z6MM.
- Palgrave, Jennifer (1 March 2021). Rising Tide. Town Belt Press. ISBN 9780473560508.
- Palgrave, Jennifer (22 July 2024). Where the River Goes. Town Belt Press. ISBN 9780473709945.

=== Other ===
- Lapsley, Hilary Mary; Nikora, Linda Waimarie; Rosanne Marjory Black (2002), "Kia Mauri Tau!" Narratives of recovery from disabling mental health problems, Te Hiringa Mahara, hdl:10289/1666, Wikidata Q130511430
- Lapsley, Hilary Mary; G M Vaughan (1979). "Was 1898 a "great date" in the history of experimental social psychology?". Journal of the History of the Behavioral Sciences. 15 (4): 323–332. doi:10.1002/1520-6696(197910)15:4<323::aid-jhbs2300150405>3.0.co;2-i. PMID 11608235. Wikidata Q74634667.
- Tia Dawes; Muru, Marama; Lapsley, Hilary Mary; Ngapare Hopa; Dixon, Ngahuia Mereana; Cilla Moore; Charmaine Tukiri; Nicholas Jones; Manning, Charlotte; Oh, Moana (2020). "Hongi, Harirū and Hau: Kaumātua in the time of COVID-19". Journal of the Royal Society of New Zealand. 51 (sup1): S23–S36. doi:10.1080/03036758.2020.1853182. Wikidata Q130348567.
- Lapsley, Hilary Mary; Ngaire Kerse; Simon A. Moyes; Sally Keeling; Muru, Marama; Wiles, Janine Lindsay; Santosh Jatrana (2018). "Do household living arrangements explain gender and ethnicity differences in receipt of support services? Findings from LiLACS NZ Māori and non-Māori advanced age cohorts". Ageing & Society. 40 (5): 1004–1020. doi:10.1017/s0144686x18001514. Wikidata Q130510748.
