= Fiona Wiremu =

Māori academic and executive leader

Fiona K Wiremu
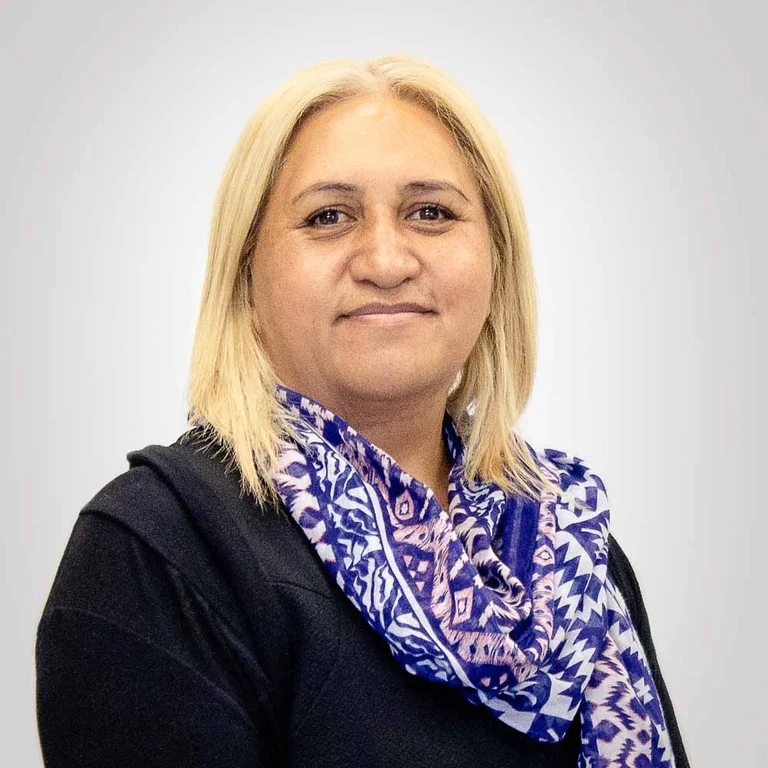
- Occupations: Māori academic, researcher, director
- Board member of: Te Puna Ora o Mataatua, Whānau Āwhina Plunket, Te Puna Ora o Rongoa Māori Ltd, Te Puna Manawa o Tarawera (t/a Tarawera Medical Centre), Whakatane Medical Practice Ltd (t/a Rehua Medical Centre), Te Whakareia Bay of Plenty Community Health Alliance, NZ Food Safety Science & Research Centre, Te Whare Wānanga o Awanuiārangi

Fiona K Wiremu (born 1970) is a New Zealand Māori academic, researcher and director. Her tribal affiliations are Tūhoe and Ngāti Ranginui.

Wiremu is the first wahine Māori (Māori woman) appointed to the role of chairperson of The Royal New Zealand Plunket Trust Board for Whānau Āwhina Plunket.

Since 2016, Wiremu has held the position of chair of Te Puna Ora o Mataatua, the largest regional kaupapa Māori health, social and employment provider in Aotearoa New Zealand. She is an executive member of the Māori Women's Welfare League and an executive director at Te Whare Wānanga o Awanuiārangi.

== Academic research ==
Wiremu's academic research centres on Te Ao Māori concepts of Mātauranga Māori health and community development, Whai Rawa (Māori economies), Te Taiao (natural environment), and Mauri Ora (human flourishing and wellbeing). She is known for co-authoring and presenting papers on indigenous economic development and health frameworks, including models for food sovereignty. In her research for Ngā Pae o te Māramatanga (New Zealand's Māori Centre of Research Excellence) Wiremu raises the distinction between western ideas of ‘food’ and the Māori cultural concept of 'kai’.

== Career and governance roles ==
Wiremu has a Bachelor of Management Studies (BMS) and a Post-Graduate Diploma in Management Studies (PgDipMS) from the University of Waikato. Wiremu has worked with Te Whare Wānanga o Awanuiārangi since 2007 in a variety of roles including lecturer of Indigenous Business and Te Pou Hono (marae-centred programmes). In April 2015 she became an executive director.

Wiremu was appointed to the board of Te Puna Ora o Mataatua in 2013 and later was appointed Chairperson (2016-). As part of her Chairperson role, Wiremu is a member of Te Whakareia Bay of Plenty Community Health Alliance (2016-). Wiremu also chairs subsidiary Te Puna Ora o Rongoā Māori (trading as Te Whare o Rehua), which oversees Rehua Medical and Te Puna Ora o Mataatua interests in Tarawera Medical, Rehua Nuku Ora mobile clinic and Ngā Ringa Kōkōmuka Rongoā Māori Clinics.

Wiremu spoke publicly against the proposed Treaty Principles Bill in her role as Te Puna Ora o Mataatua Chairperson, saying "As kaitiaki (guardian) of Māori health and wellbeing, we cannot stand silent while the foundations of our partnership with the Crown are undermined." Te Puna Ora o Mataatua was also a joint applicant in a landmark High Court challenge over the disestablishment of Te Aka Whai Ora Interim Māori Health Authority, with its CEO Christopher Tooley leading the organisation's submissions.

An active member of the Māori Women's Welfare League since 2015, Wiremu initially served as Waiariki regional executive treasurer (2015-2020) and then became Waiariki area representative (2020-).

Since 2022 Wiremu has been a trustee for Plunket, a charity first established in the early twentieth century and New Zealand's largest support service for the health and wellbeing of tamariki (children) under five and their whānau (families). Wiremu was appointed Chairperson in 2025, the first Māori woman to hold the position.

In 2023 Wiremu was appointed to the board of NZ Food Safety Science & Research Centre Te Tira Whakamana at Massey University. That year Wiremu also became a director of Ngā Āhuatanga o te Kai Limited, The Kai Institute, a charitable company and joint venture initiative of Te Whare Wānanga o Awanuiārangi and Te Puna Ora o Mataatua. The Kai Institute re-introduces traditional kai (Māori food) practices with the aim of preserving kai mātauranga (food knowledge) and protecting Māori cultural identity.

== Peer-reviewed journal articles ==
- Guinto, R., Holley, K., Pictou, S., Tinirau, R., Wiremu, F., Andreé, P., Clark, J. K., Levkoe, C. Z., & Reeve, B. (2024). Challenging power relations in food systems governance: A conversation about moving from inclusion to decolonization. Journal of Agriculture, Food Systems, and Community Development, 13(2), 1-18.
- Rout, M., Reid, J., Mika, J. P., Whitehead, J., Gillies, A., Wiremu, F., McLellan, G., & Ruha, C. (2024). Indigenising the blue economy in Aotearoa New Zealand. Marine Policy, 161, 105987.
- Mika, J. P., Smith, G. H., Gillies, A., & Wiremu, F. (2019). Unfolding tensions within post-settlement governance and tribal economies in Aotearoa New Zealand. Journal of Enterprising Communities: People and Places in the Global Economy.
