= Māori Marsden =

New Zealander author, minister and philosopher (1924–1993)

Māori Marsden (10 August 1924 – 18 June 1993) was an author, an ordained Anglican minister and expert (tohunga) on Māori philosophy.

== Biography ==
Marsden was born in Awanui, in the far north of New Zealand 10 August 1924. His parents were Hoani Matenga-Paerata and Hana (nee-Toi) Matenga-Paerata. Māori Marsden is affiliated with the Te Aupouri iwi, and also Ngāi Takoto, Ahipara, and Ngāti Wharara of Ngāpuhi. His secondary education was at Wesley College in Paerata and he went to the University of Auckland and studied a Bachelor of Arts. He was also educated in the traditional Māori centre of learning 'Te Whare Wananga o Ngāpuhi. He was the chair-person of the Auckland University Māori Club while he was studying there.

Marsden's father was a member of the clergy Reverend Hoani Matenga, and Marsden attended New Zealand Bible Training Institute (now Laidlaw College). Marsden also graduated from St. John’s College, Auckland in 1957 with a Licentiate in Theology (2nd Class Honours). The same year at age 33 he became an Anglican minister.

He was priested in 1958 at St Peter's Waikato by the Ven. John Holland; was the assistant curate of Frankton (1957–59); was the assistant curate of Tokoroa (1959–60); priest in charge of the Taranaki Maori Pastorate (1960–63); Māori Chaplain to the NZ Armed Forces (1963–71); assistant priest of Devonport (1971–74); officiating minister to the Auckland Dioceses (1974–76); assistant priest of Devonport (1976–84); pastor of Northern Wairoa (1984–85); Auckland Māori Missioner (1985–87).

Marsden was in World War II as a member of the 28th Māori Battalion. He was the Royal New Zealand Navy chaplain for twelve years. He was the first Māori chaplain of the Navy. Researcher Robyn Tauroa says whilst Marsden was at the Navy he 'provided karakia and also guided unuhia ceremonies to prepare Māori for battle'.

Marsden's essay God, Man and Universe, published in Te Ao Hurihuri (1975) has been described as a 'seminal work'. As a writer Marsden wrote about 'matters facing the contemporary Māori quest for social justice and the achievement of authentic being.' Marsden also composed waiata, and was a guest speakers at many events.

== Publications ==
- Te Ao Hurihuri (1975)
- Māori Illness and Healing (1986)
- Resource Management Law Reform (1989)
- Kaitiakitanga: A Definitive Introduction to the Holistic World View of the Māori (1992) co-authored with T. A. Henare
- The Woven Universe: Selected Writings of Rev. Maori Marsden (2003) edited by Te Ahukaramū Charles Royal, produced by the Royal Society Te Apārangi and Ngā Pae o te Māramatanga

== Death ==
On 18 June 1993 Marsden died at his residence (the old hospital) in Te Kōpuru.
