= Rongomaraeroa =

Marae at Te Papa, Wellington

- Marae
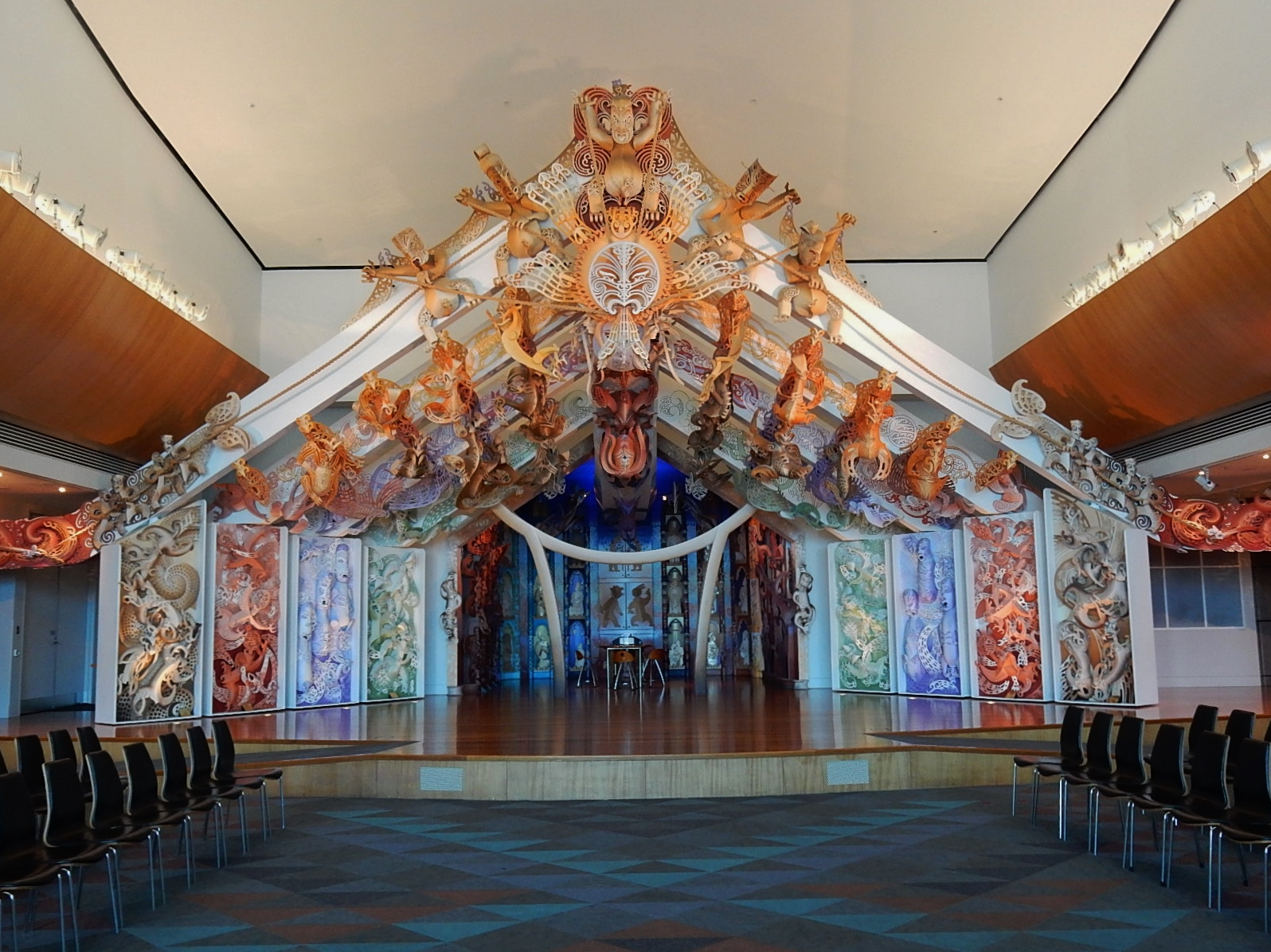
- The wharenui (meeting house) of the marae
- Interactive map of Rongomaraeroa
- Coordinates: 41.2899°S 174.7825°E
- Location: Te Papa, Wellington, New Zealand
- Iwi: Pan-iwi
- Rūnanga: Te Papa
- Opened: 30 November 1997
- Wharenui: Te Hono ki Hawaiki
- Website: Te Papa – Rongomaraeroa

Rongomaraeroa is the marae of the Museum of New Zealand Te Papa Tongarewa and incorporates a contemporary wharenui (meeting house) Te Hono ki Hawaiki. It is located on the museum's 4th floor overlooking Wellington harbour, and was officially opened on 30 November 1997.

The design, described as "postmodern", was overseen by Te Papa's inaugural kaihautu (Māori leader), master carver Cliff Whiting. As "the only one of its kind expressly built for that purpose in a museum", this marae is "arguably the most prominent embodiment of [Te Papa's] commitment to biculturalism".

== Purpose and usage ==
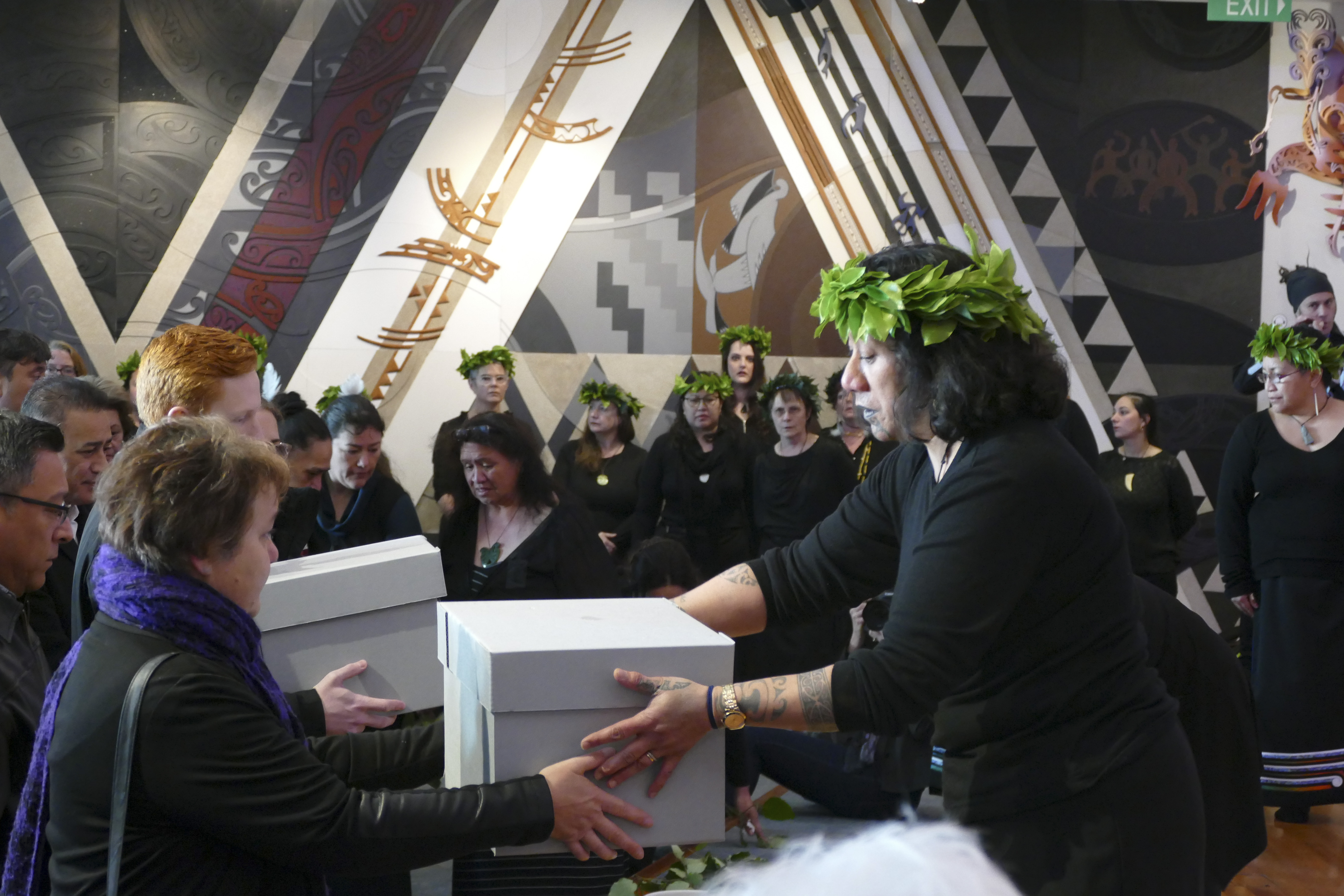
Pōwhiri [welcoming ceremony] for the repatriation of 17 Māori and Moriori ancestral remains at Rongomaraeroa (2018)

Rongomaraeroa is used for many events, not only as a museum exhibit – it was always intended to be a "'living marae' used for pōwhiri, functions, and tangi". For example, in May 2017 and July 2018 the marae was the site of ceremonies of repatriation of Māori and Moriori remains – including toi moko – from several European and American institutions. Rongomaraeroa is unique in its ability to serve as the location for such ceremonies as it is a "nationalised, pan-iwi marae". As traditional gathering spaces, marae are always located on the ground. However, given the situation of this one on an upper level of the building, Whiting nicknamed Rongomaraeroa "the marae in the sky". The name also helped to differentiate it as a marae belonging to the museum "with its own special Te Papa kawa [protocols]", and not to Te Āti Awa – the local iwi [tribe] of the Wellington area. Although initially controversial and charged with being a "reappropriation" of complex Māori practices and protocols "...to serve its reconciliatory, bicultural remit, often at the expense of more contested issues such as Māori self-determination...", it is now widely accepted as a genuine marae, "by intention if not by inheritance". Rongomaraeroa is also available for hire from Te Papa for commercial and private events.

Te Hono ki Hawaiki is not to be confused with the traditional wharenui of the Rongowhakaata iwi: Te Hau ki Tūranga. Dating from the 1840s, this is the oldest extant carved meeting house and is on long-term loan to Te Papa. It is displayed in the nearby exhibition of Māori culture Mana Whenua.

== Design ==
Rongomaraeroa has a usable space of 350m² and can accommodate 250 people. Carvings for the wharenui were made by Whiting using the non-traditional material medium-density fibreboard (MDF) rather than rare native timber. This enabled the forming of unusual and elaborate three-dimensional shapes. Non-traditional colours as well as European, Asian, and Polynesian design references were incorporated in order to include all cultures of contemporary New Zealand. "It reflects the nation's bicultural foundations while embracing everyone. It's innovative in its story-telling and its design...[Cliff] extended the boundaries of Māori art by using contemporary materials and resources" stated his successor Arapata Hakiwai in 2013. For example, the wharenui includes a triptych shrine featuring a Christian dove, "in order to come up with something that not only Māori could relate to but Europeans as well."

Carvings in arches and pillars of Te Hono ki Hawaiki representing Māori myths and legends include:

- The story of Māui slowing the sun depicted on the maihi [arms] of the wharenui.
- The story of the creation of the first woman, Hineahuone, by her father Tāne Mahuta the god of the forest, represented in the doorway.
- Māui turning his brother-in-law, Irawaru, into a dog.
- The story of Paikea the whale rider.
- And "the changing relationship between Māori and Pākehā [European New Zealanders] is portrayed inside the cupboards housed in the poutokomanawa (the central heart post of the meeting house)".

Guests can be ceremonially lead up to the marae space without having to go through other exhibitions which was a design consideration to support pōwhiri.

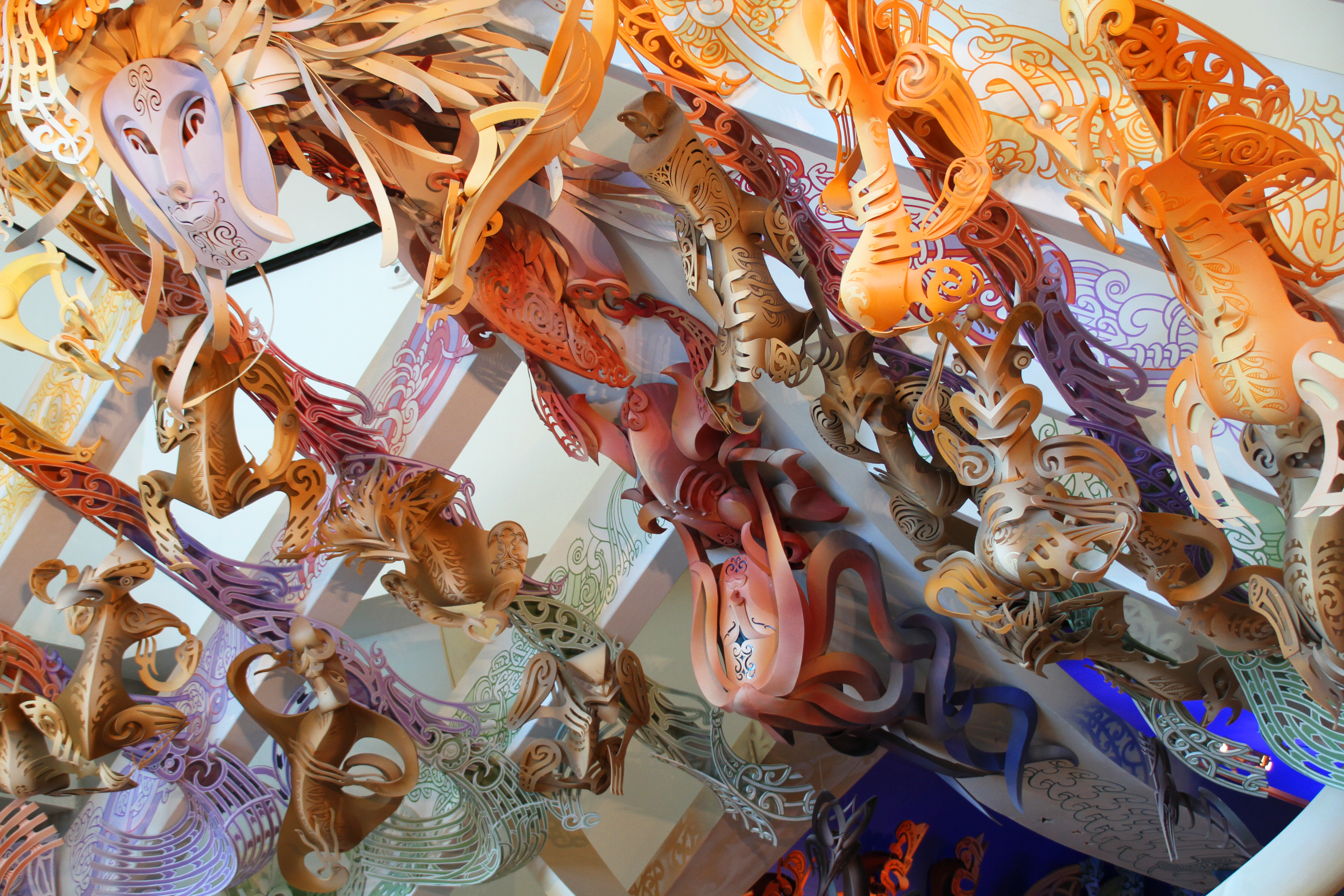
Detail of the contemporary carvings by Cliff Whiting on the wharenui.

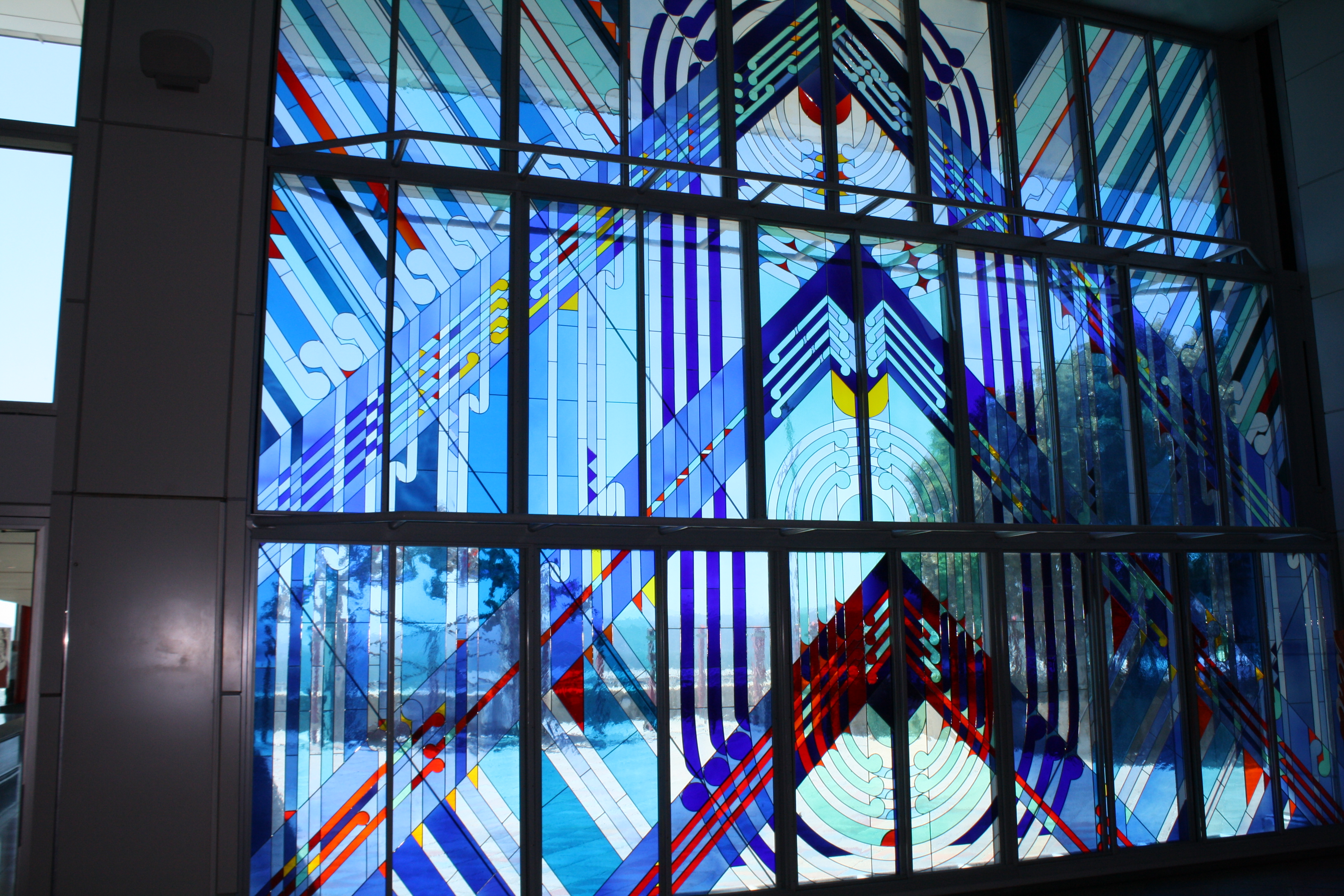
detail of the stained glass door, depicting Ranginui (the sky father). When opened, "it pushes upwards away from the flooring (which depicts Papatūānuku, the earth mother), re-enacting the traditional Māori story of [their] separation."

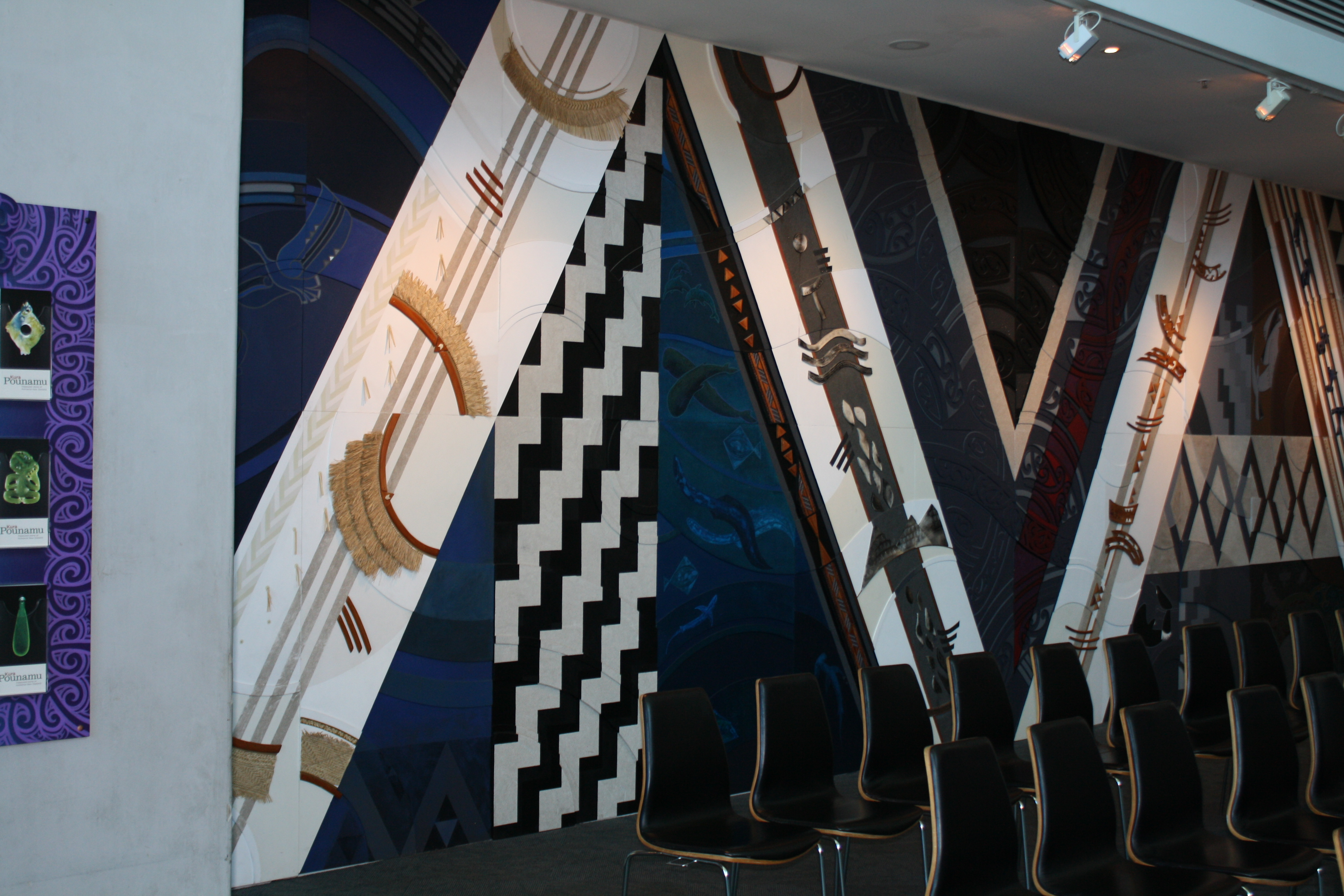
Tukutuku [woven panels] on the walls. Made by students of Toi Haukura.

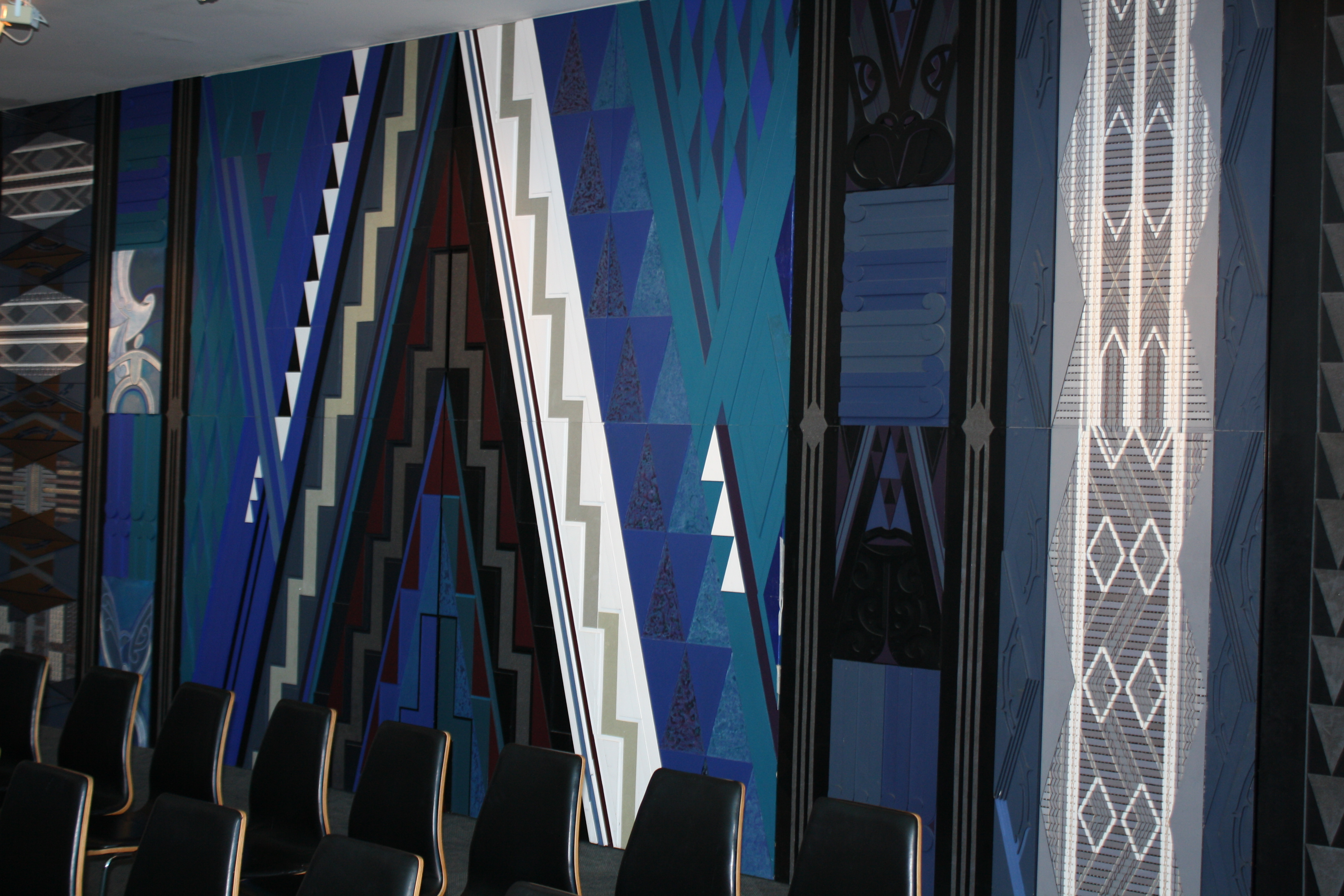
Panels on the opposite wall.

== Naming ==
In Māori mythology, Te Hono ki Hawaiki refers to Hawaiki – the original home island of all Polynesians – while Rongomaraeroa is another name for Rongo, the god of kūmara and other cultivated food. Rongomaraeroa is also the name given to the marae belonging to several hapū [sub-tribes] of the Ngāti Kahungunu and Heretaunga Tamatea iwi along the South-Eastern coastline of New Zealand's North Island.

== See also ==
- Māori mythology
- New Zealand design
