= Christopher Tooley =

Māori academic and health leader

Doctor Christopher Tooley
- Born: 31 March 1977 (age 49)
- Education: Cambridge University (Ph.D); University of Auckland (MBA Hons)
- Occupation: Chief Executive Officer
- Employer: Te Puna Ora o Mataatua
- Known for: Indigenous rights advocacy
- Awards: Awards and honours
- Website: www.tpoom.co.nz

Christopher Wiremu Roy Tooley (born 31 March 1977) is a New Zealand Māori academic, executive and indigenous health leader. Known as Chris Tooley, he is the chief executive officer of Māori health and social services provider Te Puna Ora o Mataatua based in Whakatāne, New Zealand.

Tooley, whose tribal affiliation is Ngāti Kahungunu, is a Gates Scholar with a Ph.D from the University of Cambridge. He was elected to the Gates Scholars Council and is a former editor of the Cambridge Review of International Affairs. Tooley is the recipient of a Blake Leadership Award from the Sir Peter Blake Trust (2020), and a Distinguished Alumni Award from the University of Auckland (2023).

Known for his indigenous rights advocacy, Tooley served as a member of Te Aka Whai Ora (Interim Māori Health Authority) (2021–22), and as Vice-Chair of the International Work Group for Indigenous Affairs (2015–2019).

He was Senior Ministerial Advisor to Sir Pita Sharples, Minister of Māori Affairs and Associate Minister of Education and Corrections in the New Zealand Government (2009–2014).

== Education ==
Tooley originally studied to be a physical education teacher after representing New Zealand in track and field junior teams for both Athletics New Zealand and New Zealand Secondary Schools.

He earned a Bachelor of Education (B.Ed) from Massey University and a Diploma of Teaching (Dip. Tchg) from Auckland College of Education in 1998, then went on to complete a Master of Arts with First-Class Honours (M.A (Hons)) at the University of Auckland in 2000. Tooley was part of the University of Auckland's Māori and Indigenous (MAI) Post-Graduate Programme and was awarded a Māori honours scholarship for his research on the struggle of indigenous people.

The following year (2001), Tooley was the first New Zealander to be invited to the United Nations University Governance Academy in Tokyo, where he gained Certificates of UN Systems & International Development.

Tooley was accepted for both Oxford University and Cambridge University in 2002. He was awarded a Gates Cambridge Scholarship and completed his Ph.D at Cambridge University, where he was a member of Girton College. His Ph.D focused on developing an ethics of self-determination and how indigenous peoples and cultural minorities can achieve self-determination. Applying his model to the case of Palestine, Tooley spent time in the occupied territories, Israel, Syria, and Lebanon. Upon return to New Zealand, Tooley became a Postdoctoral Research Fellow in Political Studies at the University of Auckland.

Tooley has a Certificate in Te Reo Māori, Te Pokaitahi Reo (Rumaki), Level 4, from Te Wānanga o Aotearoa and in 2025, attained a Certificate in Leading Artificial Intelligence Innovation in Healthcare, from Harvard University.

== Career, advisory and governance roles ==
Tooley became involved in political advocacy and campaigning early in his career as the New Zealand delegate to the International Youth Parliament in Sydney in 2000, then to the United Nations World Youth Forum in Dakar in 2001. From 2001–2003, Tooley served as Co-Chair of the International Advisory Board for the International Youth Parliament.

Tooley was co-chair of the Tāmaki Makaurau Electorate Campaign for Sir Pita Sharples, the co-leader of the Māori Party, in the lead up to the 2008 New Zealand General Election. Tooley then became Senior Ministerial Advisor for Sharples in the New Zealand Parliament, Wellington (2009 to 2014), when Sharples was Minister of Māori Affairs and Associate Minister of Education and Corrections. In this role, Tooley was involved in negotiations that led to New Zealand's endorsement of the UN Declaration on the Rights of Indigenous Peoples (April 2010), following 25 years of international drafting (1982–2007) and three years of New Zealand government opposition.

Tooley was vice-chair of the International Work Group for Indigenous Affairs (2015–2019). He has been an active member of the Gates Cambridge network, serving as a councillor (external liaison) for the Gates Scholars Council in Cambridge for two years (2002 to 2003), and as the New Zealand regional coordinator for the Gates Cambridge Alumni Association of the United Kingdom in 2015. He was an Academic Board Member for Te Wānanga o Aotearoa (2015 to 2018) and in 2024 served as a mentor for the Kupe Leadership Development Programme, run by the University of Auckland Foundation.

Tooley's advisory roles include for Pou Tangata Iwi Leaders Group (National Iwi Chairs Forum) (2017 to 2021), as a member of the COVID-19 Māori Reference Group for the New Zealand Ministry of Health (2019), member of the National Emergency Management Agency Ministerial Advisory Committee, in Wellington (2021 to 2023), and co-chair of the Regional Skills Leadership Group, Bay of Plenty (2019 to 2023).

His governance positions span Māori, health, government, and social service organisations. From 2017 to 2020, Tooley was Chair of Te Huarahi Tika Trust, where he was a key member of the Māori Spectrum Working Group that worked with Waitangi Tribunal claimants, government officials and the Minister of Broadcasting on Māori radio spectrum rights. Tooley was Chair of the Māori Advisory Board for Accident Compensation Corporation from 2022 to 2023, and a Director for the Whānau Ora Commissioning Agency, Auckland, from 2024 to 2025.

Tooley currently sits on the Board of Directors for Athletics New Zealand (2023–) and is a Trustee for the Eastern Bay of Plenty Primary Healthcare Alliance in Whakatāne (2025–).

Since 2016 Tooley has held the role of CEO of Te Puna Ora o Mataatua, a kaupapa Māori health and social service provider and charitable trust working across New Zealand’s eastern Bay of Plenty region. During this time, Te Puna Ora o Mataatua reported an increase in revenue growth of $27.9m, from $3.6m in 2016 to $31.5m in 2022.

== Te Aka Whai Ora (Māori Health Authority) and Treaty of Waitangi Principles submissions ==
Tooley served as a member of the Interim Te Aka Whai Ora (Māori Health Authority) from 2021 to 2022. He presented a submission to the Waitangi Tribunal as part of its inquiry into the Government's decision to abolish Te Aka Whai Ora. Tooley submitted that “Te Aka Whai Ora was a once-in-a-lifetime opportunity to not only change Māori health outcomes, but to also change the health system."

In August 2025, Tooley represented Te Puna Ora o Mataatua in the New Zealand High Court as one of several Māori health providers challenging the Government's decision to abolish Te Aka Whai Ora. Tooley stated that the case has the potential to broaden the legal interpretation of the Treaty of Waitangi and give Māori human rights greater influence in New Zealand law. Tooley gave evidence of alleged breaches of the Treaty of Waitangi and the New Zealand Bill of Rights Act 1990 and said that although the Waitangi Tribunal had already ruled that the disestablishment of Te Aka Whai Ora breached the principles of the Treaty of Waitangi, the High Court should go further and issue a statement of inconsistency against the Treaty. The courts have never made a declaration of inconsistency against the Treaty of Waitangi before.

Tooley submitted in opposition to the Treaty Principles Bill before the New Zealand Parliament in January 2025. On behalf of Te Puna Ora o Mataatua, Tooley condemned the bill and said that it was a “simple piece of fiction that only has the intent of colonising Māori.”

== Publications ==
Tooley has contributed as a writer or editor for several publications including the Cambridge Review of International Affairs. From 2006 to 2007, Tooley was Section Editor for the Cambridge Review of International Affairs and in 2007, he was copy editor for The Gates Scholar, University of Cambridge. In 2008 Tooley was Managing Editor of AlterNative, a quarterly peer-reviewed academic journal published by Ngā Pae o te Māramatanga, New Zealand's Māori Centre of Research Excellence at University of Auckland (2008). In this role he helped to consolidate the journal's operational infrastructure and raise its international profile.

News articles
Tooley, C. (May 21, 2024). Left with an outdated philosophy that seems to replicate failed models. The Post
Buchanan, C. (November 12, 2023) Chris Tooley: Understanding Palestine as a colonising process E Tangata
Tooley, C. (November 20, 2018). Is Whānau Ora about to be scrapped? The Spinoff
Tooley, C. (2015). In the bubble: A meditation on time well spent in government Gates Cambridge The Scholar
Tooley, C. (November 19, 2014). Chris Tooley: The modern renaissance of Maori is moving into a new era. New Zealand Herald

Academic writing
Tooley, C. (2008). Indigenous peoples: in pursuit of the right to self-determination. Cambridge Review of International Affairs, 21(1), 5–6.
Tooley, C.W.R (2007). An Ethics of Self-Determination. Thesis (Ph.D). Department of Education. University of Cambridge.
Tooley, C. (2006). Indigenous Self-Determination in Quebec: An Interview with Chief Picard. AlterNative: an international journal of indigenous peoples, 3.1, 220–232.

== Awards and honours ==
2023	Distinguished Alumni Award, University of Auckland
2022	Matariki Award, Waitī (Health & Science), Whakaata Māori
2021	Ministry of Health Equity Award (Te Puna Ora o Mataatua), NZ Primary Healthcare Awards
2020	Blake Leadership Award, Sir Peter Blake Trust
2005	Humanities and Social Sciences Research Award, University of Cambridge
2005	Gates Scholars Delegation, H.R.M. Queen Elizabeth II and H.R.H. Prince Philip
2002	Gates Scholarship (Gates Scholar), University of Cambridge
2002	Universities UK Overseas Research Award, University of Cambridge
2002	Ngarimu VC and 28th Battalion Memorial Scholarship
2000	Masters Research Scholarship, University of Auckland
