= Lois Cox =

New Zealand writer

Lois Jennifer Cox is a New Zealand writer. She writes under her own name and is also one half of a writing partnership with Hilary Lapsley which publishes under the pen-name Jennifer Palgrave.

== Biography ==
In 1974, Cox worked with Harvey McQueen to co-edit the first anthology for schools of work by contemporary New Zealand poets, Ten Modern New Zealand Poets.

From 1995 to 1998 she was one of a team of three interviewers who collected oral histories of older lesbians who had grown up in New Zealand in the 1950s and 1960s. In 2000, she received a New Zealand History Research Trust Fund award to develop the project. In 2003, she contributed a chapter to Outlines: lesbian & gay histories of Aotearoa. Cox wrote the project up as the book, That's what I am: Oral Histories of Older Lesbians, which appeared in 2025.

== Publications ==
- McQueen H. & Cox L. (1974). Ten Modern New Zealand Poets. Longman Paul.
- Palgrave J. (2019). The one that got away. Town Belt Press.
- Palgrave J. (2021). Rising Tide. Town Belt Press.
- Cox, L. (2025). That's what I am: Oral Histories of Older Lesbians. Town Belt Press.

== Personal life ==
Cox is in a long-term relationship with Hilary Lapsley. The couple split their time between Cox's home in Wellington and their apartment in an Auckland co-housing development.
