= Bob Jahnke =

New Zealand artist, professor (b. 1951)

Bob Jahnke ONZM
- Jahnke in 2018
- Born: Robert Hans George Jahnke; 1951 (age 74–75)

Academic background
- Education: Massey University
- Thesis: He tataitanga ahua toi: the house that Riwai built, a continuum of Māori art (2006)
- Doctoral advisor: Mason Durie

Academic work
- Institutions: Massey University
- Doctoral students: Donna Campbell

Robert Hans George Jahnke ONZM (born 1951) is a New Zealand artist and educator, well-known for his graphic and sculptural artwork. He is a professor at Massey University, founding Toioho ki Āpiti in 1991, the Māori visual arts degree programme in New Zealand.

== Biography and education ==
Jahnke was born in 1951 in the Gisborne region and grew up in Waipiro Bay. His heritage is Māori, Samoan and Pākehā and he affiliates with the iwi Ngāti Porou through three hapū: Ngāi Taharora, Te Whānau a Iritekura, and Te Whānau a Rakairoa. He has German and Irish ancestry on his Pākehā side. He was educated at Hato Pāora College.

At Ardmore Teachers' College in Papakura in 1970, Jahnke was formally taught painting, ceramics and art history and realised he wanted a career in the arts. However, he did not complete his teachers' college study. After that he worked in a furniture factory and in the evenings went to AIT to study life-drawing and design.

Jahnke studied industrial design at Elam in Auckland starting in 1972, and went on to complete two master's degrees: a Master of Fine Arts in graphic design from Elam; and a Master of Fine Arts in experimental animation from the California Institute of the Arts. He has a Doctor of Philosophy (Māori Studies) from Massey University, supervised by Professor Mason Durie and awarded in 2006. The title of his doctoral thesis is He tataitanga ahua toi: the house that Riwai built, a continuum of Māori art.

== Career ==
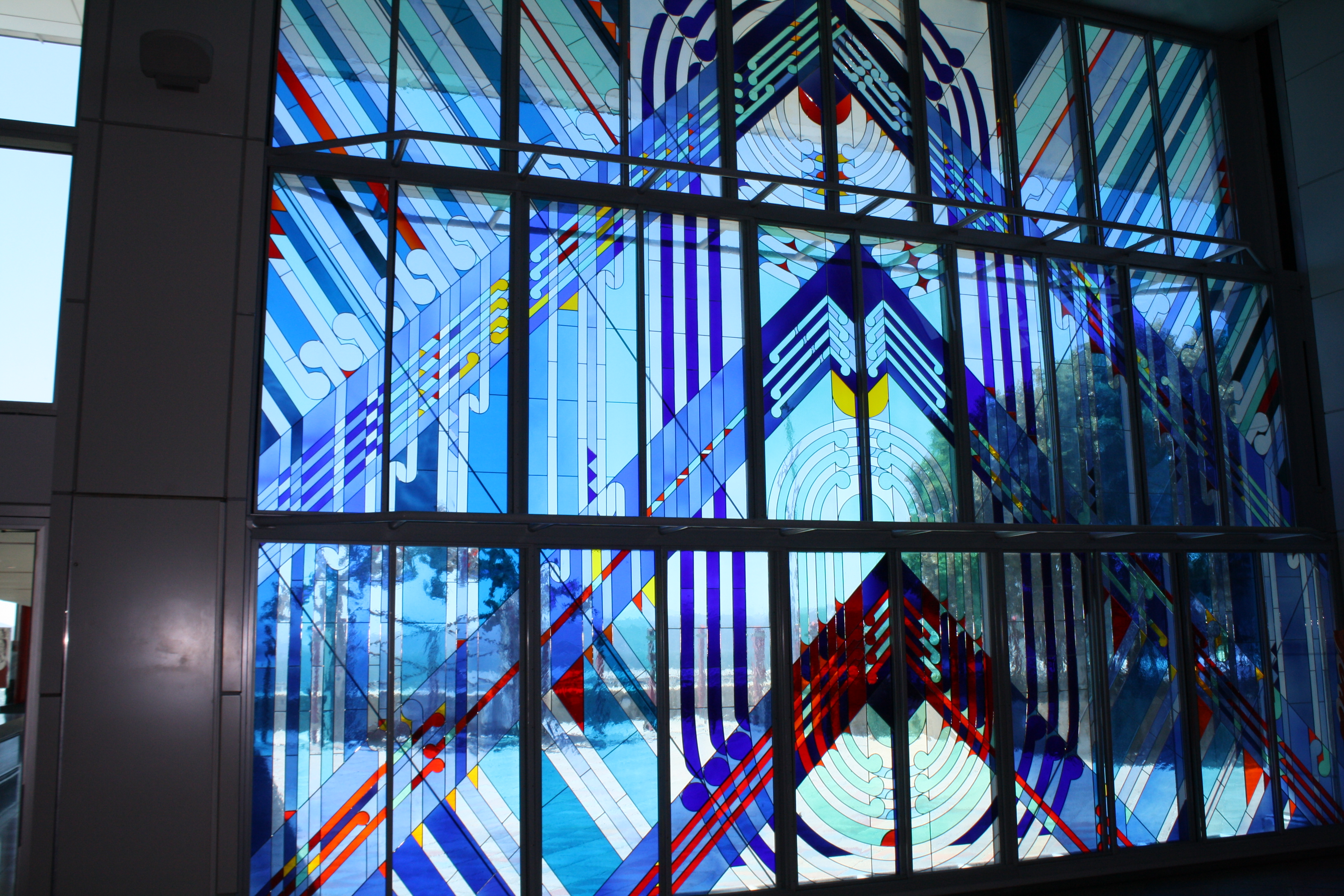
Stained glass doors of Rongomaraeroa marae at Te Papa by Bob Jahnke

In 1991 under Professor Mason Durie's direction, Jahnke started Toioho ki Āpiti, School of Māori Art at Massey University in Palmerston North. This arts programme offered the first bachelor of Māori visual arts in New Zealand. Jahnke was one of the initial tutors along Kura Te Waru Rewiri and Shane Cotton. In developing the programme Jahnke describes changing the canons of "Euro-centric art education" for one that privileged a mātauranga Māori conceptual foundation. Māori Arts is within the School of Māori Studies alongside Te Reo Māori (Mäori Language), Taonga Tuku Iho (Heritage Aotearoa) and Kaupapa Māori (Policy and Development); because of this programme design arts students get cultural experience in a marae context as part of the programme. On his role of an educator of Māori artists he says: "For me personally this commitment is a cultural obligation." Postgraduate qualifications started at Toioho ki Āpiti in 1999 and since then the over 80 postgraduate graduates have had a big influence on contemporary Māori art in New Zealand. Jahnke is a Professor of Maori Visual Arts and PhD supervisor at Toioho ki Āpiti.

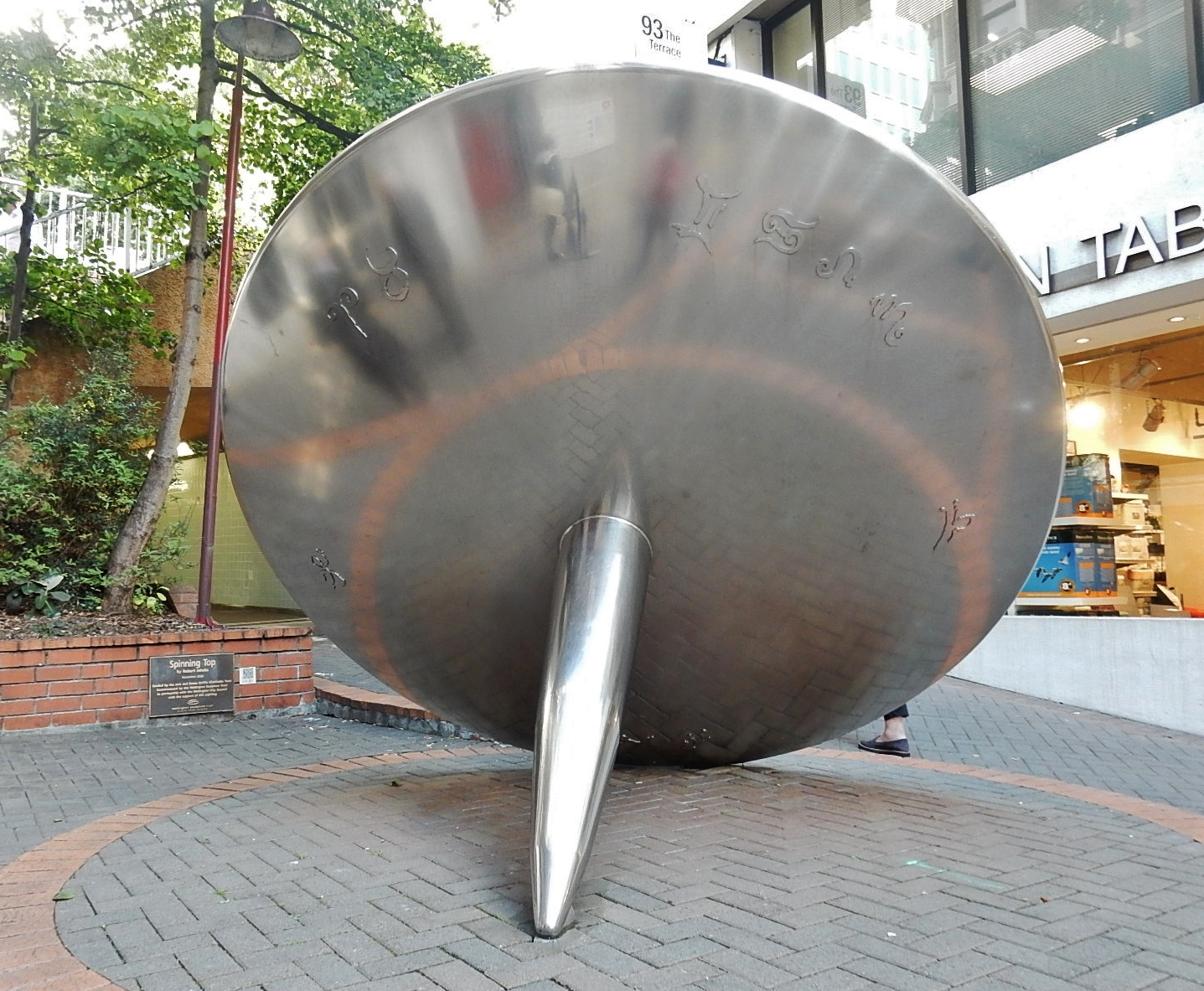
Giant Spinning Top, Bob Jahnke (2003) public sculpture, Woodward Lane, Wellington

Jahnke's artwork is usually political commenting on past, present and future colonisation and the impact of Christianity on Māori culture. The form of his artwork is varied but often sculpture. Recent work uses neon, mirrors and steel. Public artwork created includes the window design at the contemporary marae Rongomaraeroa in the Museum of New Zealand Te Papa Tongarewa, wall reliefs at the Wellington High Court and Giant Spinning Top (2003) in Wellington, and Nga Takerenui a Tamaki / Twin Hulls (2006) at the University of Auckland Tamaki Campus.

Jahnke's artwork is held in the collections of The Museum of New Zealand Te Papa Tongarewa and the Auckland City Art Gallery.

Jahnke is involved with Matakura Māori Art Education Trust, a collective of "Māori art educationalists, writers, critics, historians and curators".

Jahnke is a trustee of the Māori arts trademark charitable trust Toi Iho, and was part of launching the Toi Iho trademark in 2002, which aims to highlight authentic Māori art and artists.

== Honours and awards ==
In the 2017 New Year Honours, Jahnke was appointed an Officer of the New Zealand Order of Merit, for services to Māori art and education. In 2018 and 2019 Massey University awarded him a research medal. He won the paramount award at the 2019 Wallace Art Awards. In 2020 he was elected a Fellow of the Royal Society Te Apārangi and he was awarded a Te Waka Toi Award for "outstanding contribution to ngā toi Māori". In 2023, Jahnke received an Arts Foundation of New Zealand Laureate Award.

== Personal ==
Jahnke's wife is Professor Huia Tomlins-Jahnke.
