= Orla Muldoon =

Social psychologist

Academic background
- Education: Queen's University of Belfast
- Thesis: Childhood stress and coping: a psychosocial approach (1996)

Orla Therese Muldoon is an Irish social and political psychologist and professor of psychology at the Queen’s University Belfast. Her research concerns how groups memberships and social identities affect health and well-being.

== Education and career ==
Muldoon attended Queen's University of Belfast where she received a first class honours bachelor's degree in Psychology. She earned her Ph.D. from Queen's University of Belfast in 1996. During this time she also attended University of Michigan as a John F Kennedy Travel Scholar. She was a faculty member at Ulster University and Queens University Belfast. She moved to University of Limerick in 2007 to lead the development of a new department of psychology.

Muldoon was editor-in-chief of the journal Political Psychology, a position she shared with James Liu. She was formerly editor-in-chief of the Journal of Community and Applied Social Psychology.

Muldoon has served on the board of the Irish Research Council from 2021.

Muldoon is a serving member of the Irish Medical Council.

== Research ==
Muldoon's research concerns how groups memberships and social identities mediate the relationship between health, well-being as well as social and political attitudes. She is the author with colleagues of the Social Identity Model of Traumatic Identity Change. She has examined the impact of the war in Northern Ireland on children, the impact of domestic violence, brain injury and sexual violence. and social identity and post-traumatic stress disorder.

Muldoon has made major contributions to debates raising concern's about Ireland's response to the COVID-19 pandemic because of the lack of diversity on the panel making recommendations. She has spoken with the media about the statistics of violence against women, and is a regular opinion contributor to The Irish Times.

== Selected publications ==
- Muldoon, O. T. (2024). The Social Psychology of Trauma: Connecting the Personal and the Political. Cambridge University Press. Open Access
- Muldoon, Orla; Lowe, Robert; Jetten, Jolanda; Cruwys, Tegan; Haslam, S Alexander (2021). "Personal and political: Post-traumatic stress through the lens of social identity, power, and politics". Political Psychology. 42 (3): 501–533. doi:10.1111/pops.12709. hdl:10344/10561. PMC 8247337.
- Muldoon, Orla T.; Haslam, S Alexander; Haslam, Catherine; Cruwys, Tegan; Kearns, Michelle; Jetten, Jolanda (2019). "The social psychology of responses to trauma: Social identity pathways associated with divergent traumatic responses". European Review of Social Psychology. 30 (1): 311–348. doi:10.1080/10463283.2020.1711628. hdl:1885/287036.
- Muldoon, Orla T.; Trew, Karen; Todd, Jennifer; Rougier, Nathalie; McLaughlin, Katrina (2007). "Religious and National Identity after the Belfast Good Friday Agreement". Political Psychology. 28 (1): 89–103. doi:10.1111/j.1467-9221.2007.00553.x. hdl:10197/2429. ISSN 1467-9221.

== Awards and honors ==
In 2020, Muldoon won the Nevitt Sanford Award for outstanding contributions to political psychology from the International Society of Political Psychology. She received a Fulbright Award in 2020, and was one of the first two women in Ireland to receive a European Research Council Advanced Grant. In 2022 she was elected a member of the Royal Irish Academy. In 2024, Muldoon was the recipient of the European Research Council Public Engagement with Research award.
