= Te Puna Ora o Mataatua =

Charity from New Zealand

- Formation: 1991
- Purpose: To provide services to Māori and the general population based on an integrated whānau ora (holistic support to families) approach to hauora (Māori concept of wellbeing).
- Headquarters: 92 King Street, Kōpeopeo, Whakatāne 3120
- Location: New Zealand
- Services: Health, medical, social and employment services
- CEO: Christopher Tooley
- Key people: Fiona Wiremu, Shelley Cunningham
- Website: www.tpoom.co.nz

Te Puna Ora o Mataatua (Charitable Trust) is the largest regional kaupapa Māori health, medical, social and employment provider in New Zealand.

Based in Whakatāne in the Eastern Bay of Plenty region, Te Puna Ora o Mataatua has been recognized for its innovative and equitable healthcare approach for Māori people and minority communities. Its CEO Chris Tooley is a Gates Scholarship recipient and award-winning Māori business leader.

== History ==
Te Puna Ora o Mataatua was established in 1991 by Te Whānau Poutirirangiora a Papa, which included Iwi representatives from Tūhourangi, Te Whakatōhea, Ngāti Awa, Ngāti Pikiao, Ngāti Ranginui, Ngāti Rangiteaorere, Tapuika, Tūhoe ki Waimana, Ruatoki, Ruatāhuna, Ngāti Rangiwewehi, Waitaha, Ngāti Rangitihi, Ngāti Manawa, Ngāi Te Rangi and Ngāti Pukenga. The name Te Puna Ora o Mataatua (Iwi Hauora Trust) was given by kaumatua Hieke Tupe from Waiohau.Te Puna Ora means the spring of life in te reo Māori and Mataatua was one of the great voyaging canoes by which Polynesians migrated to New Zealand, according to Māori tradition. The organisation was registered as a Charitable Trust under the New Zealand Charities Act 2005 on 24 June 2008.

== Structure ==
Chris Tooley is the Chief Executive Officer of Te Puna Ora o Mataatua (2016-) and its Board of Trustees is chaired by Fiona Wiremu. Te Puna Ora o Mataatua employs approximately 112 staff based in Whakatāne over five sites and has around 400 support workers, serving more than 1550 direct clients and over 3500 medical patients.

Te Puna Ora o Mataatua has three subsidiaries, structured as joint ventures: Ngā Āhuatanga o te Kai, a research institute joint venture with Te Whare Wānanga o Awanuiārangi; Te Tūāpapa Ahaha, a joint venture with Ngāti Ranginui and Ngā Kākano Foundation; and Te Whakareia, a joint venture with Ngāti Ranginui, Whaioranga Trust and Healthcare New Zealand. In November 2025, Te Puna Ora o Mataatua launched a new fourth subsidiary, Te Puna Ora o Rongoā Māori, trading as Te Whare o Rehua, to manage its medical services and oversee its interests in medical clinics, with Shelley Cunningham appointed Chief Executive.

== Healthcare for Māori, rural and minority communities ==
Te Puna Ora o Mataatua implements a model based on Te Ao Māori (indigenous Māori world view) concepts of Whānau Ora (healthy families) and Pae Ora (healthy futures) through a policy framework called Te Poutokomanawa o Te Puna Ora. Its holistic services include rongoā Māori (traditional Māori healing). In October 2022, Te Puna Ora o Mataatua opened an integrated medical hub in Whakatāne, called Rehua Medical (formerly known as Med Central), with capacity to enrol up to 10,000 patients. In 2023 it worked with community partners to launch a community hub to deliver integrated whānau ora healthcare to Te Teko, a rural and predominantly Māori community.

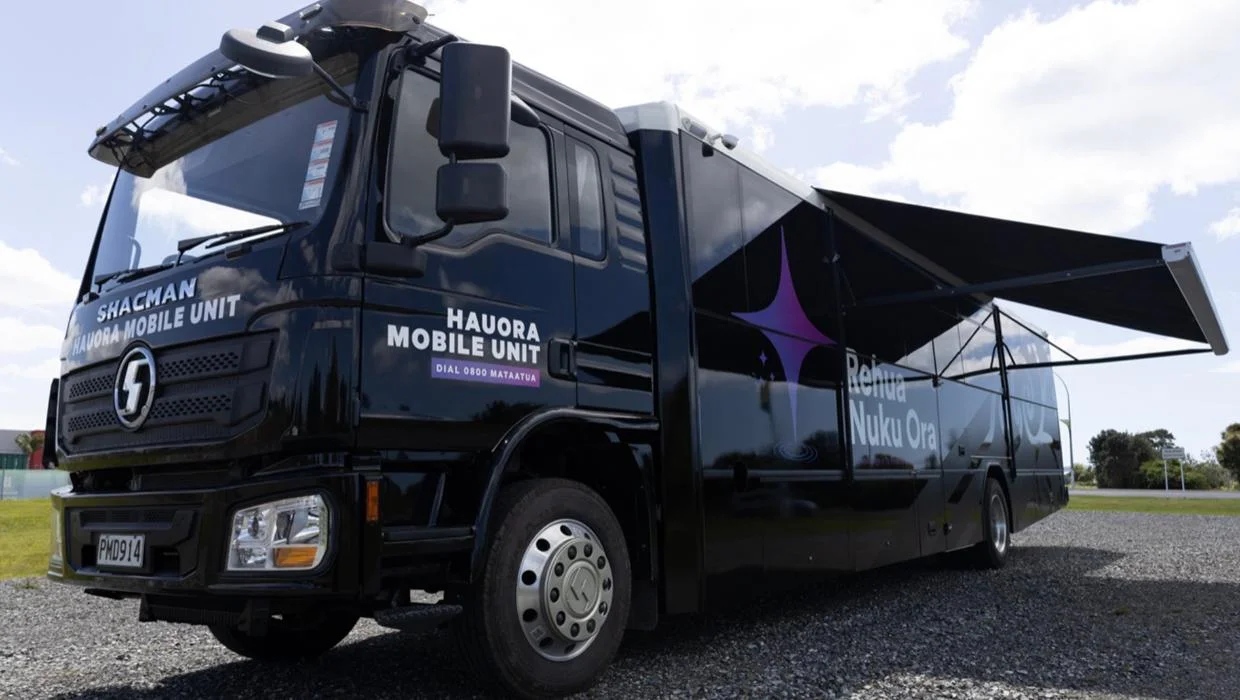
Rehua Nuku Ora, operated by Te Puna Ora o Mataatua

Te Puna Ora o Mataatua operates the largest General Practice mobile unit in New Zealand. Known as Rehua Nuku Ora, it has its own power and water supply, immunisation facilities, a satellite to access health records and can be redeployed as an emergency response unit in a civil defence emergency.

In July 2025 Te Puna Ora o Mataatua introduced a new tagline, Toi Ora Motuhake, to reflect its commitment to empowering Māori health and wellbeing. The concept of Toi refers to tipuna (ancestor) Toi-te-hua-tahi and the whenua (land), Ora (wellbeing) refers to dedication to health, and Motuhake (self-determination) emphasises independence.

== Partnerships ==
In 2020 Te Puna Ora o Mataatua established a Medical Academy together with Te Whare Wānanga o Awanuiārangi, which provides a Bachelor of Health Science Māori Nursing, to enhance the education, training and employment goals of Māori in the region. Māori Development Minister Willie Jackson opened the academy and endorsed its by-Māori for-Māori approach as “the only way to turn negative statistics around."

Te Puna Ora o Mataatua has partnered with veterans’ organisations including government department Veterans’ Affairs to deliver health and social services to war veterans, in deals that are the first of their kind in New Zealand. Te Puna Ora o Mataatua signed a contract with Te Teko RSA in 2023 to support its veterans, with the organisation later breaking away from the Royal New Zealand Returned and Services' Association because of a new constitution that did not recognise Te Tiriti o Waitangi. In January 2025, Veterans Minister Chris Penk said that the partnership with Te Puna Ora o Mataatua to identify and assist veterans, and jointly run health and support clinics including social and employment support, could provide a blueprint for how Veterans’ Affairs works with Māori across New Zealand.

Te Puna Ora o Mataatua has worked with several community-focused organisations, including charity Have a Heart.

== Social Return on Investment (SROI) ==
A 2025 SROI analysis measured Te Puna Ora o Mataatua's social and economic impact. The analysis was undertaken by Habilis New Zealand Ltd, using methodology co-developed with Cubus NZ. The report 'Te Puna Ora o Mataatua Social Return on Investment 2025' showed that for every $1 invested in services, Te Puna Ora o Mataatua produces $5.33 of social benefit. Its service with the highest score was Rehua Nuku Ora (mobile health clinic) with a SROI of $1:$11.75, followed by its Medical Academy service scoring a SROI of $1:10.50.

== COVID-19 response ==
Te Puna Ora o Mataatua was one of the largest providers of Covid-19 vaccines in the Eastern Bay of Plenty and served communities with mostly Māori populations and high rates of deprivation. During the pandemic, Te Puna Ora o Mataatua undertook an outreach programme and expanded its operations to marae and rural areas to ensure access was not a barrier for people who chose to receive the vaccination. In December 2021, Te Puna Ora o Mataatua gave evidence at an urgent Waitangi Tribunal inquiry into the New Zealand government's Covid-19 response and how it affected Māori. Deputy chief executive Shelley Cunningham spoke to the Tribunal about the barriers the organisation faced from the Ministry of Health and the district health board for funds and resources for Covid-19 testing and vaccinations.

== Advocacy and Te Tiriti o Waitangi ==
Te Puna Ora o Mataatua CEO Chris Tooley was a member of Te Aka Whai Ora (Interim Māori Health Authority) from 2021 to 2022. He publicly criticised the government’s decision to disestablish Te Aka Whai Ora and said that the initiative had the potential to be the most transformative enabler for addressing systematic health inequity experienced by Māori. Tooley also claimed that the New Zealand government funding cuts would make equity issues worse for Māori.

In May 2024, Te Puna Ora o Mataatua, Te Kōhao Health (Lady Tureiti Moxon), Ngāti Hine Health Trust and Papakura Marae, with support from Pou Tangata, National Iwi Chairs Forum jointly filed action in the New Zealand High Court against the New Zealand Government, challenging the disestablishment of Te Aka Whai Ora Interim Māori Health Authority. The applicants alleged the government breached Te Tiriti o Waitangi and the New Zealand Bill of Rights Act in disestablishing the Māori Health Authority. Tooley, on behalf of Te Puna Ora o Mataatua, said Te Aka Whai Ora was key to addressing systematic health inequities experienced by Māori people and its disestablishment should be declared inconsistent with the New Zealand Bill of Rights Act 1990 and Te Tiriti o Waitangi. After four days of hearings in Wellington, the High Court reserved its decision on 29 August 2025.

== Awards ==
· The Royal New Zealand College of General Practitioners Service Medal, 2024, Dr Jethro LeRoy, Medical Director, Te Puna Ora o Mataatua

· Dapaanz Excellence in Mātauranga Māori Addiction Practice, 2023, Ngā Mata Waiora Counselling and Therapy Team, Te Puna Ora o Mataatua

· Whakaata Māori Ngā Tohu Matariki o Te Tau (Māori Matariki Awards), Waitī (Health & Science) Award, 2022, Dr. Chris Tooley, CEO, Te Puna Ora o Mataatua

· New Zealand Primary Healthcare Awards, Ministry of Health Equity Award, He Tohu Mauri Ora, 2021, Te Puna Ora o Mataatua

· Te Rūnanga o Aotearoa New Zealand Nurses Organisation, Te Akenehi Hei Award (Nurse of the Year), 2016, Pare O'Brien, Rehua Medical, Te Puna Ora o Mataatua
