= Sharan Merriam =

American educator

Sharan B. Merriam is professor of adult education at the University of Georgia. Her focus has been researching and writing about adult learning and the foundations of adult education. She has won the Cyril O. Houle Award for Outstanding Literature in Adult Education for three of her books. In 1998 she was a senior Fulbright scholar to Malaysia.

== Biographical information ==
Presently on the faculty in Adult Education at the University of Georgia in Athens, where her responsibilities include teaching graduate courses in adult education and qualitative research methods, and supervising graduate student research. Her doctorate is in adult education from Rutgers University. Prior to her move to Georgia, she served on the faculties of Northern Illinois University and Virginia Tech. Merriam served as author, co-author, or editor of 25 books and was co-editor of the Adult Education Quarterly for five years.

Merriam is especially known for her work on qualitative case studies in educational research.

Along with numerous teaching and research awards, Merriam has been a Fulbright Scholar to Malaysia and a visiting scholar to Soongsil University, South Korea and won the Cyril O. Houle Award for Outstanding Literature for three different books.

== Honors and awards ==
Visiting Scholar, Department of Lifelong Education, Soongsil University, Seoul, South Korea (March to June, 2006)

Elected to the Board of Directors, Capella University, Minneapolis, Minn(3-year term of service) 2004

Inducted into the International Adult and Continuing Education Hall of Fame. 2003

Recipient of the Career Achievement Award from the Commission of Professors of Adult Education (awarded once every three years). 2002

Recipient of the Houle World Award for Outstanding Literature in Adult Education for the book, Learning in Adulthood, at AAACE. 2000

Selected for the Inaugural Class of The University of Georgia Teaching Academy. 2000

Fulbright Lectureship and Research Award to University Putra Malaysia, Serdang, Malaysia (June to December, 1998)1998

Recipient of the Houle World Award for Outstanding Literature in Adult Education for the book The Profession and Practice of Adult Education: An Introduction, at AAACE.1997

Selected as a Senior Teaching Fellow, Office of Instructional Development, University of Georgia, Athens, GA.1997

Selected as one of two delegates from the commission of Professors of Adult Education (CPAE) to participate in the Fifth International UNESCO Conference on Adult Education, Hamburg, Germany.1997 Summer Outreach Award to support collaboration with Universiti Pertanian Malaysia. 1997

Meritorious Service Award, American Association of Adult and Continuing Education, for service to the field as co-editor of Adult Education Quarterly.1993

Georgia Adult Education Association’s Literary Award for Lifelines: Patterns of Work, Love and Learning in Adulthood.1993

Selected as an Advisor/Mentor for the National Extension Leadership Development (NELD) program, University of Wisconsin–Madison and Kellogg Foundation.1992/1993

Selected to be a research fellow with the Project for the Study of Adult Learning (PSAL), a National University Continuing Education Association sponsored project.1991/1992

== Select bibliography ==
- Merriam, Sharan B. (2007). Non-Western perspectives on learning and knowing. Malabar, Fla: Krieger Pub. Co. ISBN 9781575242804.
- Merriam, Sharan (2007). Learning in adulthood a comprehensive guide (3rd ed.). San Francisco: Jossey-Bass. ISBN 9780470229224.
- Elias, John; Merriam, Sharan (2005). Philosophical foundations of adult education (3rd ed.). Malabar, Fla: Krieger Pub. ISBN 9781575242545.
- Merriam, Sharan; Caffarella, Rosemary (1999). Learning in adulthood : a comprehensive guide (2nd ed.). San Francisco: Jossey-Bass Publishers. ISBN 9780787910433. (Winner of the 2000 Cyril O. Houle Award For Outstanding Literature in Adult Education; translated into Chinese, 2003)
- Merriam, Sharan (1998). Qualitative research and case study applications in education. San Francisco: Jossey-Bass Publishers. ISBN 9780787910099.
- Merriam, Sharan; Brockett, Ralph (1997). The profession and practice of adult education : an introduction. San Francisco: Jossey-Bass Publishers. ISBN 9780787902902. (Winner of 1997 Cyril O. Houle Award For Outstanding Literature in Adult Education)
- Merriam, Sharan (1995). A guide to research for educators and trainers of adults (2nd ed.). Malabar, Fla: Krieger Pub. Co. ISBN 9780894648496. (First edition, 1984, winner of the 1984 Philip Franson Memorial Award for Literature in Continuing Education.)
- Darkenwald, Gordon; Merriam, Sharan B. (1982). Adult education : foundations of practice. New York: Harper & Row. ISBN 9780690015416. (Translated into Chinese, 1984. Winner of the 1985 Cyril O. Houle Award For Outstanding Literature in Adult Education)

== Editorships ==
Editor, with Ronald M. Cervero, of the book series, Professional Practices in Adult Education and Lifelong Learning, Krieger Publishing Company. (currently)

Editor, with Ronald M. Cervero of Adult Education Quarterly, the major journal of research and theory in Adult Education. Editorship involved organizing and administering a 50-member review board, managing a blind review process, corresponding with authors, editing accepted manuscripts and overseeing desktop publishing of the journal. Journal is published four times a year. 1989-1993

Editor, with Phyllis Cunningham, of the Handbook of Adult Education. This service to the Association of Adult and Continuing Education involved conceptualizing the project, securing authors for 48 chapters, editing the chapters, working with the Association over format, content and budget.

Consulting Editor for Adult Education Quarterly, Adult Literacy and Basic Education, The Canadian Journal for the Study of Adult Education, The Gerontologist, International Journal of Aging and Human Development, International Journal of Lifelong Education, New Zealand Journal of Adult Learning, and Qualitative Studies in Education.
