= Ageing & Society =

- Discipline: Gerontology; Sociology
- Language: English
- Edited by: Christina R. Victor

Publication details
- History: 1981–present
- Publisher: Cambridge University Press
- Frequency: Monthly
- Impact factor: 1.62 (2017)

Standard abbreviations
- ISO 4: Ageing Soc.

Indexing
- CODEN: AGSOD9
- ISSN: 0144-686X (print); 1469-1779 (web)
- LCCN: 83640195
- OCLC no.: 962363352

Links
- Journal homepage; Online access; Online archive

Ageing & Society is a monthly peer-reviewed scientific journal covering gerontology from a sociological perspective. It was established in 1981 and is published by Cambridge University Press. The editor-in-chief is Christina R. Victor (Brunel University). According to the Journal Citation Reports, the journal has a 2017 impact factor of 1.62, ranking it 17th out of 36 journals in the category "Gerontology".
