= Darrin Hodgetts =

New Zealand academic

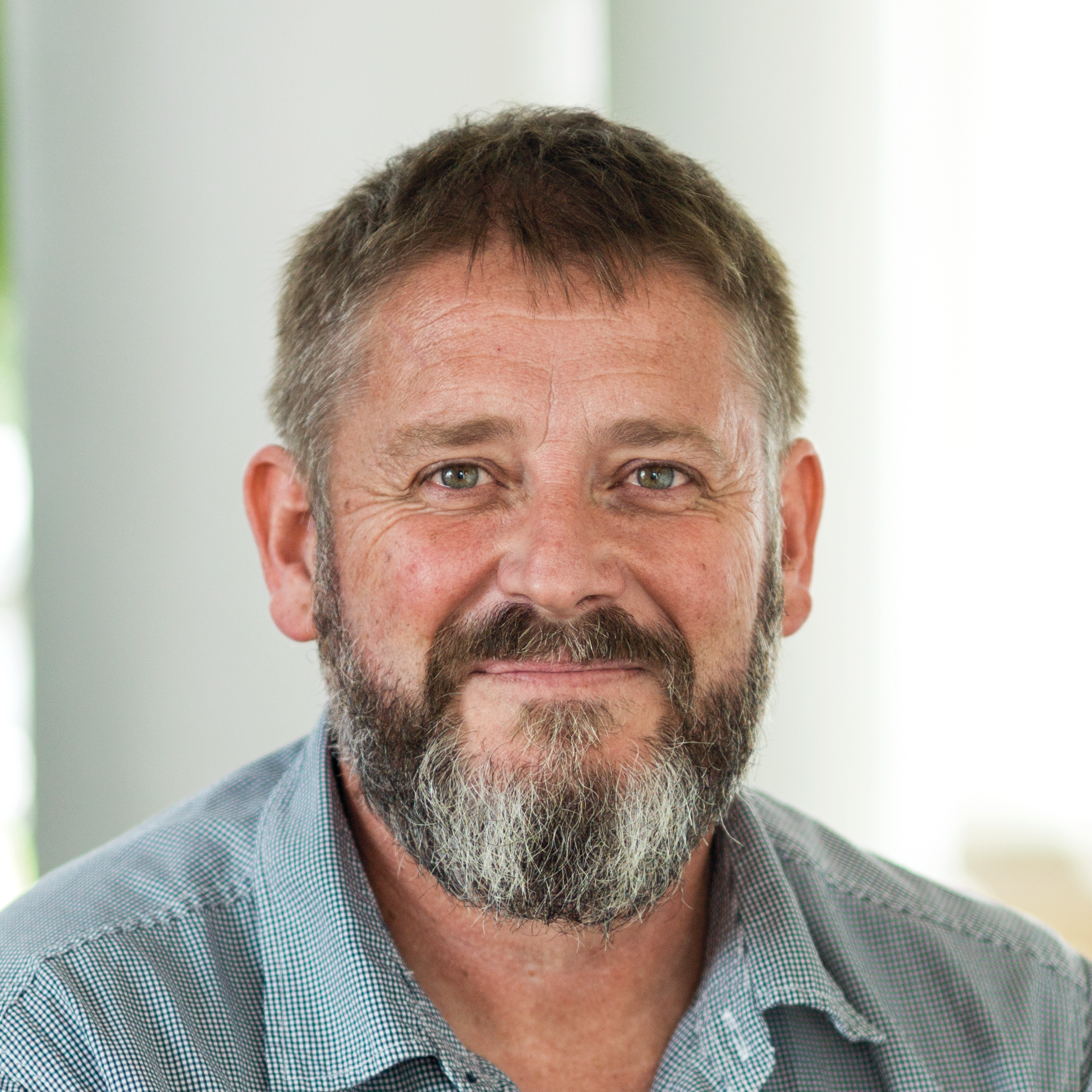
- Education: Massey University
- Scientific career
- Fields: Social psychology
- Workplaces: London School of Economics; University of Waikato; Massey University
- Thesis: Understanding health and illness: an investigation of New Zealand television and lay accounts (2000)
- Doctoral advisors: Kerry Chamberlain; Keith Beattie; Graham Bassett

Darrin James Hodgetts is a New Zealand psychology academic. He is a professor of societal psychology at Massey University.

Professor Hodgetts has a PhD from Massey University. His research is in the field of social psychology, looking at homeless and working class communities' identities, health and poverty.

== Research ==
Professor Hodgetts has authored 152 journal articles (across various international journals: Nature; Review of General Psychology; Political Psychology; Journal of Health Psychology; Theory and Psychology; Urban Studies; Human Geography; Health and Place; Journal of Community Psychology; American Journal of Community Psychology; Military Psychology; Sustainability; Applied Science; Philosophical Transactions of the Royal Society Lond B - Biological Science; Sustainability Science; Social Science & Medicine; Ethnography; Visual Studies; Journal of Medical Case Reports; Scientific Reports). Professor Hodgetts has also published 59 chapters and commissioned reports and delivered 17 conference keynotes and plenary addresses.

His book length texts include:

- Tackling Precarious Work - Toward Sustainable Livelihoods.
- Social Psychology and Everyday Life.
- SAGE Handbook of Applied Social Psychology.
- Asia-Pacific Perspectives on Intercultural Psychology.
- Urban Poverty and Health Inequalities – A Relational Approach.
- Towards Rethinking the Primacy of Epistemology in Psychology.
- The Place of Class - Considerations for psychology.
- Case-Based Research in Community and Social Psychology.

Professor Hodgetts has also engaged in numerous knowledge translation collaborations (e.g., facilitated workshops, written briefs, and supported a documentary theatre production) private sector organisations and trusts, city authorities, public audiences, and central government agencies (NZ Office of the Prime Minister and Cabinet; Ministry of Social Development; Institute of Judicial Studies; Productivity Commission; Auckland City Mission; British Ministry of Health; Welcome Trust). Some examples include:

- Social regeneration framework for Murihiku (Southland). Commissioned Report for Murihiku Regeneration: Hokonui Rūnanga: Ngāi Tahu.
- Project Salaam: Evaluation report. For the Ministry of Social Development & Massey University.
- Single Parents & Tertiary Education. Commissioned Report for The Auckland City Mission.
- Understanding Employer Motivations and Challenges to Living Wage Accreditation. Commissioned Report for the Principle Partners Council of the Living Wage Campaign Aotearoa.
- Knowledge and experiences of government income-support efforts to alleviate in-work poverty.Health Research Council in-work poverty and wellbeing project. Ministry of Social Development.
- Precariat Māori households today: The need to reorient policy to cultivate more humane understandings of whānau in need. Ngā Pae o te Māramatanga. Te Arotahi Series Paper. Ministry of Social Development.
- Urban design impacts on safety and liveability in Tauranga and Western Bay of Plenty. Commissioned Report for Tauranga City Council and Safer Cities.
- Te Iwi Māori: Community people, agencies and services provided. Commissioned Report for the Community Trust of Southland.

== Selected publications ==
=== Journal articles ===
- Radley, Alan, Darrin Hodgetts, and Andrea Cullen. "Visualizing homelessness: A study in photography and estrangement." Journal of Community and Applied Social Psychology 15.4 (2005): 273–295.
- Hodgetts, Darrin, et al. "Health inequalities and homelessness considering material, spatial and relational dimensions." Journal of Health Psychology 12.5 (2007): 709–725.
- Hodgetts, Darrin, et al. "A trip to the library: Homelessness and social inclusion." Social & Cultural Geography 9.8 (2008): 933–953.
- Hodgetts, Darrin, et al. "Constructing health news: possibilities for a civic-oriented journalism." Health: 12.1 (2008): 43–66.
- Hodgetts, Darrin, Andrea Cullen, and Alan Radley. "Television characterizations of homeless people in the United Kingdom." Analyses of Social Issues and Public Policy 5.1 (2005): 29–48.

=== Books ===
- Urban Poverty and Health Inequalities: A Relational Approach (with Ottilie Stolte, Routledge, 2017)
- Social Psychology and Everyday Life (with Drew, Sonn, Stolte, Nikora, and Curtis, Red Globe 2010 and Springer 2019)

=== Edited volumes ===
- The SAGE Handbook of Applied Social Psychology (edited with Kieran O'Doherty, SAGE, 2019)
