= Jahnke, Richmond, Virginia =

Neighborhood of Richmond, Virginia

Coordinates: 37.523069°N 77.523866°W

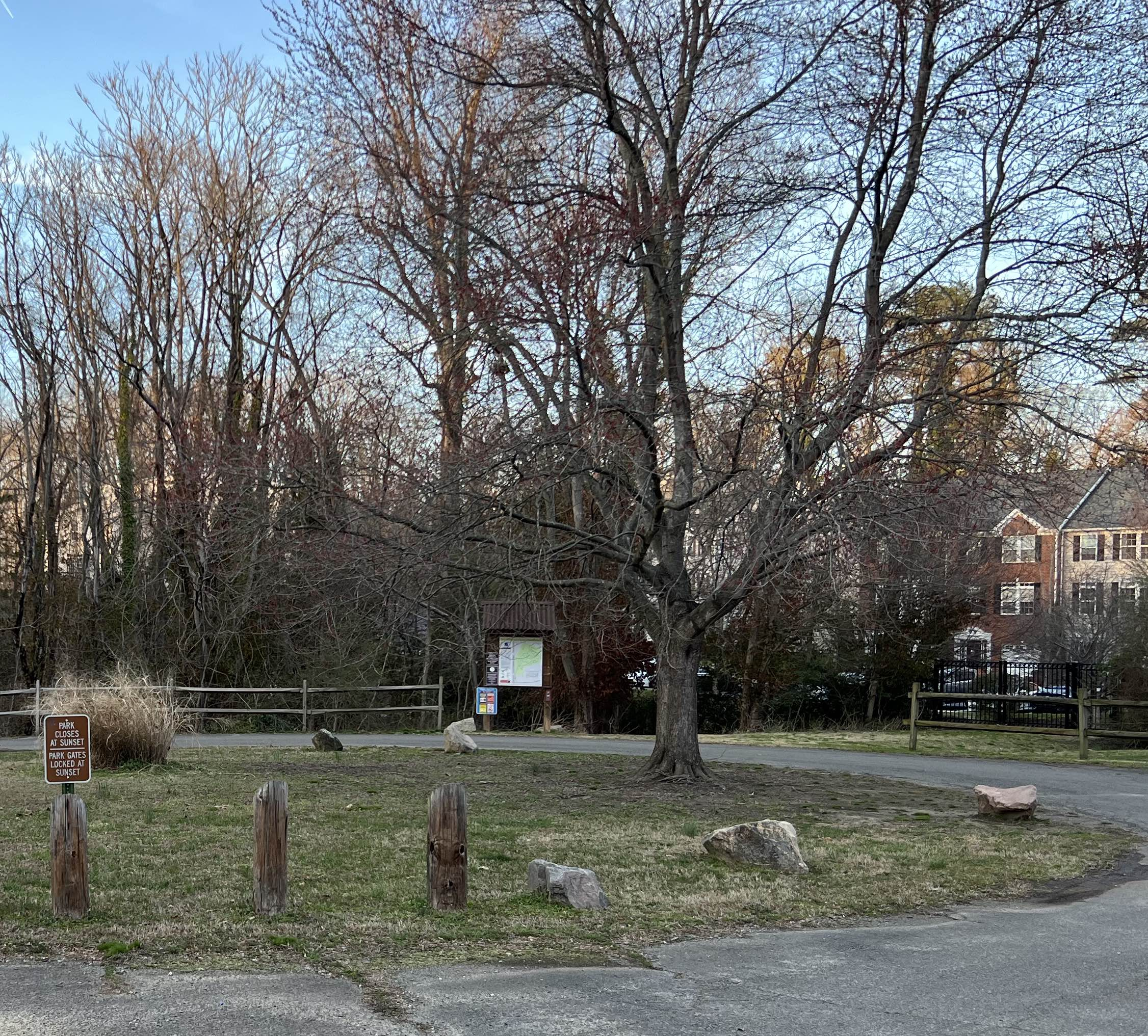
Powhite Park in Jahnke.

Jahnke is a neighborhood in Richmond, Virginia located in the Southside region of the city. The neighborhood lies within the city limits. The zip code for the neighborhood is 23225. Jahnke is named after Jahnke Road (State Route 686) which is the main road through the neighborhood. The heart of Jahnke is at the intersection of Jahnke Road and German School Road.

== Education ==
Jahnke contains Lucille M. Brown Middle School.

== See also ==
- Neighborhoods of Richmond, Virginia
- Southside (Richmond, Virginia)
