= Arapata Hakiwai =

New Zealand academic and museum curator

- Born: Arapata Tamati Hakiwai
- Education: Victoria University of Wellington
- Scientific career
- Thesis: Te Toi Whakairo O Ngāti Kahungunu: The Carving Traditions of Ngāti Kahungunu (2003)

Arapata Tamati Hakiwai is a New Zealand museum curator of Māori collections. He is a principal investigator with Ngā Pae o te Māramatanga, a Māori research centre at University of Auckland.

He is the current Kaihautū, or Māori leader, of Te Papa, and was the museum's acting chief executive before the appointment of Rick Ellis.

In 2014 Hakiwai completed a PhD at Victoria University of Wellington with a thesis on the politics of Māori tribal identity.

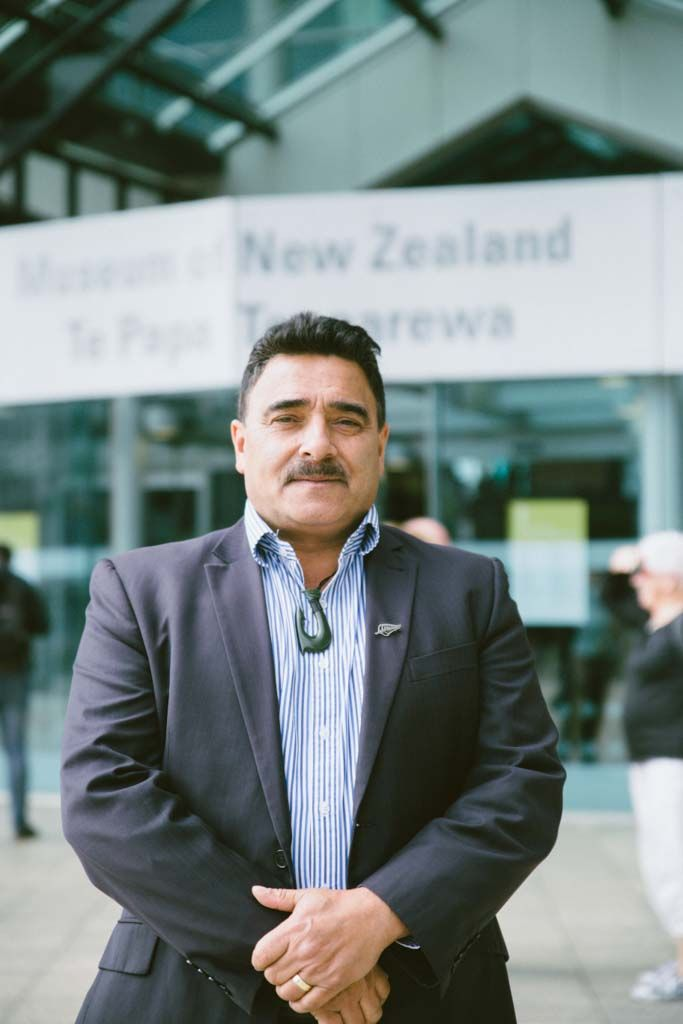
Arapata Hakiwai, Kaihautū at Te Papa

== Career ==
Hakiwai was a teacher at Wellington High School before starting work in the museum sector in 1989.

While at Te Papa he has been involved in the repatriation of a number of Maori kōiwi tangata (human remains) from overseas institutions, and has also led a project involving the "digital repatriation" of taonga (cultural treasures). Hakiwai estimated that at least 15–16,000 taonga might be held overseas.

Hakiwai is a co-author of the 2021 volume Hei Taonga Mā Ngā Uri Whakatipu / Treasures for the Rising Generation: The Dominion Museum Ethnological Expeditions 1919–1923. The work was listed in Books of Mana as one of the 180 most significant works of Māori-authored non-fiction.

== Personal life ==
Hakiwai is of Ngāti Kahungunu, Rongowhakaata, Ngāti Porou and Ngāi Tahu descent.
