= Te Ahukaramū Charles Royal =

New Zealand Māori musician and academic

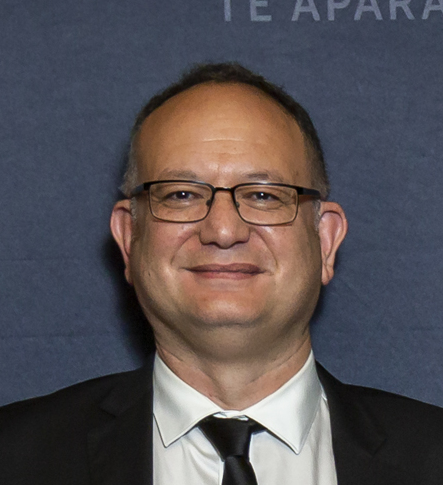
At 2019 Research Honours Aotearoa

Te Ahukaramū Charles Royal is a New Zealand musician, academic, and Māori music revivalist. He is of Ngāti Whanaunga, Ngāti Raukawa, Ngāti Tamaterā, and Ngā Puhi descent.

He received a Bachelor of Music from Victoria University of Wellington in 1989, followed by a Master of Philosophy in Māori studies from Massey University. He was director of graduate studies and research at Te Wānanga o-Raukawa and professor of indigenous development at University of Auckland.

Royal compiled and edited work by Māori Marsden into The Woven Universe: Selected Writings of Rev. Maori Marsden that was published in 2003 by the Royal Society Te Apārangi and Ngā Pae o te Māramatanga.

In 2013, he was appointed to the MBIE Science Board.
