= International Journal of Qualitative Methods =

- Discipline: Qualitative research
- Language: English
- Edited by: Linda Liebenberg

Publication details
- History: 2002-present
- Publisher: SAGE Publications
- Frequency: Quarterly
- Open access: Yes
- Impact factor: 2.257 (2018)

Standard abbreviations
- ISO 4: Int. J. Qual. Methods

Indexing
- ISSN: 1609-4069 (print); 1609-4069 (web)
- OCLC no.: 1021357530

Links
- Journal homepage; Online archive

The International Journal of Qualitative Methods is a quarterly peer-reviewed open access academic journal covering research methods with respect to qualitative and mixed methods research. It was established in 2002 and is published by SAGE Publications on behalf of the University of Alberta's International Institute for Qualitative Methodology, of which it is the official journal. The editor-in-chief is Linda Liebenberg (Dalhousie University). According to the Journal Citation Reports, the journal has a 2018 impact factor of 2.257, ranking it 17th out of 98 journals in the category "Social Sciences, Interdisciplinary".
