= Journal of Community and Applied Social Psychology =

British journal

The Journal of Community and Applied Social Psychology is a bimonthly peer-reviewed academic journal that publishes papers dealing with social psychology and community psychology in the context of community problems and strengths. The journal is aimed at community practitioners and community/social psychology professionals and researchers. The editor-in-chief was Flora Cornish (London School of Economics & Political Science) until 2016. Orla Muldoon of the Dept of Psychology at the University of Limerick took over at this stage.

== Readership ==
The Journal of Community and Applied Social Psychology is aimed at a readership consisting of social psychologists, clinical psychologists, social workers, administrators, community practitioners, health professionals, social scientists, and psychiatrists. The journal is also open to lay members of the community by maintaining a less formal dialog with them through its Communications and commentary sections.

== Content ==
The journal publishes:

- Research papers
- Review articles
- Innovations in practice
- Communications and commentary
- Book and other media reviews
- Calendar of events
