= Ngā Pae o te Māramatanga =

Research centre in New Zealand

Ngā Pae o te Māramatanga (NPM) is New Zealand's Māori Centre of Research Excellence (CoRE). It was established in 2002 and is hosted by the University of Auckland with 21 research partners and is funded, like other CoRE's, by the Tertiary Education Commission. The mission was to conduct research for, with and by Māori communities which leads to transformation and positive change.

== History ==
Ngā Pae o te Māramatanga was established in 2002 to conducting research of relevance to Māori. It is funded by the Tertiary Education Commission and hosted by the University of Auckland. It came about in 2000, when the establishment of Centres of Research Excellence (CoRE) was announced by the New Zealand Government because Graham Smith was pro vice-chancellor at the University of Auckland. CoRE's are 'inter-organisational research networks'. For Smith, Ngā Pae o te Māramatanga was an extension of the Māori and Indigenous Graduate Enhancement programme (MAI) that he and Linda Tuhiwai Smith had established in 1988 as a mentoring programme for Māori students at Auckland University. MAI is now a national programme for Māori and indigenous post-graduate students and was part of the Ngā Pae o te Māramatanga bid. Graham Smith describes MAI coming from the kōhanga reo and kura kaupapa Māori language schooling movements from the early 1980s that created a body of Māori more conscious and critical of politics and education. The goal of MAI was to have 500 Māori PhDs in 5 years.

Smith and staff member Te Tuhi Robust prepared a bid to CoRE with the themes of bringing the knowledge systems of Western science and mātauranga Māori together, and focusing on improving socio-economic conditions of Māori through social sciences study. Ngā Pae o te Māramatanga was one of five awarded funding in 2002, chosen from a shortlist of 11. The selection panel was run by the Royal Society Te Apārangi.

== People and partners ==
The early directors of Ngā Pae o te Māramatanga were Professors Linda Tuhiwai Smith and Associate Professor Michael Walker. Tipene O'Regan was chair-person of the Board of Ngā Pae o te Māramatanga from 2006 to 2018.

Professor Jacinta Ruru and Waimarie (Linda) Nikora are the 2022 co-directors of Ngā Pae o te Māramatanga. In 2018 Kerensa Johnston was appointed chair to the Board.

Ngā Pae o te Māramatanga has 21 partner research entities that include 11 other tertiary education providers, museums Auckland Museum and Te Papa and Eco Research Associates, Landcare Research Manaaki Whenua, Te Atawhai O Te Ao, Ngāti Whātua Ōrākei Whai Maia Limited, Tokona te Raki; Māori Futures Collective, Whakauae Research Services, the Cawthorn Institute and Waikato-Tainui College of Research and Development.

Fulbright New Zealand are a partner and there is an annual Fulbright-Ngā Pae o te Māramatanga Graduate Award for postgraduate research in the field of indigenous development in the USA. The 2014 scholar was Dr Rangi Mātāmua who researched 'how astronomy is embedded within the cultural practices of indigenous peoples at the University of Minnesota in Duluth.'

Ngā Pae o te Māramantaga has supported many PhD's, an example is by Dr Eruera Tarena-Prendergast who worked with three indigenous organisations, Kamehameha Schools in Hawai’i, The Sealaska Regional Corporation of Alaska, and Te Rūnanga o Ngāi Tahu with his topic being, Indigenous Organisational Design: An analysis of their design, features and the influence of indigenous cultural values. Other notable people associated with the Centre include Jo Fletcher, Carla Houkamau, Jenny Lee-Morgan, Annemarie Gillies, Bridgette Masters-Awatere, Melinda Webber, Amokura Kawharu, Scotty Morrison, Merata Kawharu, Leonie Pihama, Arapata Hakiwai, Darrin Hodgetts, and Te Ahukaramū Charles Royal.

== Activities ==
Ngā Pae o te Māramatanga has a vision of 'Māori leading New Zealand into the future and it is focused on realising the creative potential of Māori communities and bringing positive change and transformation to the nation, and the wider world'. It publishes peer-reviewed scholarly journals, MAI Journal: A New Zealand Journal of Indigenous Scholarship and AlterNative: An International Journal of Indigenous Peoples (launched in 2012), runs a researcher directory 'Te Hononga Pūkenga' and receives reports.

In 2016 Ngā Pae o te Māramatanga had a programme of scholarships and grants for approximately NZD$500,000. These included The Whāia Ngā Pae o te Māramatanga Doctoral Excellence Scholarship of $28,000 per annum for full time doctoral study, Te Taura Whiri i te Reo Māori and Ngā Pae o te Māramatanga ‘Kia Ita’ Scholarships for Masters students and the Wāhine Ora: Ngā Pae o te Māramatanga New Horizons for Women Trust Research Award (in partnership with the New Horizons for Woman Trust).
