= List of people from Gisborne, New Zealand =

The following is a list of famous people born in Gisborne, New Zealand, and people who spent significant periods of their lives living in the Gisborne/East Coast area (from Wairoa to Te Kaha to Opotiki). Those in italic are people who weren't born in the Gisborne region but have/had spent a majority of their lives living in the region. Examples include cartoonist Murray Ball and former politician, Janet Mackey.

== Media ==
- Murray Ball (1939–2017), cartoonist, creator of Footrot Flats. While not born in Gisborne, he lived most of his adult life in Gisborne. Footrot Flats was based around his farm on the Poverty Bay Flats while the characters are based after people he knew.
- Witi Ihimaera (born 1944), author
- Bailey Mackey (born 1977), former head of sport for Maori Television; executive producer of The GC; ex-husband of former Shortland Street actress Emmeline Hawthorne who has relocated to Gisborne)
- Margaret Moth (1951–2010), CNN photojournalist
- Henare te Ua (1933–2007), broadcaster
- Neil Waka, former TVNZ journalist
- Joy Watson (born 1938), award-winning author

== Political ==
- Ron Bailey (1926–2015), politician (Labour)
- Harry Barker (1898–1994), mayor and editor
- Aaryn Barlow (1984– ), politician (Green)
- Sir James Carroll (1857–1926), acting Prime Minister (Independent then Liberal)
- Charles Chauvel (1969– ), politician (Labour)
- Bob Clarkson (1939– ), politician (National)
- David Coleman (1881–1951), politician (Labour) and mayor
- Trevor Davey (1926–2012), politician (Labour)
- Albert Davy (1886–1959), politician (Reform then United)
- Catherine Delahunty (1953– ), politician (Green)
- Harry Dudfield (1912–1987), politician (National)
- Meng Foon, longest sitting Mayor of Gisborne
- David Garrett (1957– ) politician (ACT)
- Edward Francis Harris (1834–1898), public servant
- Parekura Horomia (1950–2013), politician (Labour)
- Gareth Hughes (1981– ), politician (Green)
- Wayne Kimber (1949–2004), politician (National)
- Mōkena Kōhere (1812–1894), pioneer
- Rēweti Kōhere (1871–1954), Labour politician and historian
- Douglas Lysnar (1867–1942), politician (Reform) and mayor
- Janet Mackey (1953– ), politician, mother of Moana Mackey (Labour). Although born in Waikato, Janet has lived in Gisborne most of her adult life.
- Moana Mackey (1974– ), politician, scientist, daughter of Janet Mackey (Labour)
- Ethel McMillan (1904–1987), politician (Labour)
- Āpirana Ngata (1874–1950), politician (National), honoured by being on the NZ$50 note
- Wi Pere (1837–1915), politician (Liberal), son of Thomas Halbert and half-brother of Otene Pitau and Kate Wyllie.
- Otene Pitau (1834–1921), tribal leader, son of Thomas Halbert and half-brother of Wi Pere and Kate Wyllie.
- Hone Heke Rankin (1896–1964), tribal leader
- Arnold Reedy (1903–1971), tribal leader
- Lena Ruru (1902–1977), tribal leader
- Margaret Sievwright (1844–1905), women's rights activist
- Te Kooti (1832–1893), activist
- Esme Tombleson (1917–2010), politician (National)
- William Tucker (1843–1919), mayor
- Rana Waitai (1942–2021), politician (National then New Zealand First then Mauri Pacific)
- Allan Wallbank (1937– ), politician (Labour)
- Margaret Wilson (1947– ), politician (Labour), speaker of the house
- Kate Wyllie (1840–1913), tribal leader daughter of Thomas Halbert, half-sister of Wi Pere and Otene Pitau and grandmother of Tu Wyllie
- Tu Wyllie (1954– ), politician (New Zealand First)

== Art ==
- Peter Brown (1921–2005)
- Jolene Douglas
- Cedric Emanuel, New Zealand born Australian painter, illustrator and printmaker (1906–1995)
- Elioth Gruner (1882–1939)
- Rei Hamon (1919–2008)

== Entertainment ==
- Jackie Clarke (1966– ), actress, former New Zealand Idol judge
- Clarke Gayford (1977- ), former reality show contestant and VJ, current television personality and model as well as the husband of former Prime Minister Dame Jacinda Ardern.
- George Henare (1945– ), actor
- Rongo Keene (formerly Brightwell), New Zealand Idol Top 5 2005, Australia's Strongest Man 2016
- Darren Katene, 1814 member
- Tuini Ngawai (1910–1965), composer
- Shaquille Paranihi-Ngauma (1993– ), Titanium member
- Ngoi Pēwhairangi (1921–1985), composer
- Eru Potaka-Dewes (1939–2009), actor and activist
- Cole Smith, reality actor (The GC); cousin of Matai Smith
- Matai Smith (1977– ), Pukana presenter
- Marie Te Hapuku, soprano
- Kiri Te Kanawa (1944– ), opera diva
- Bronwyn Turei (1984– ), actress
- Chanel Whalley (1977– ), Australian Idol Top 10 2004
- Phyllis Williams (1905–1993), singer

== Military ==
- Geoffrey Fisken (1916–2011)
- Hēnare Kōhere (1880–1916)
- Te Moananui-a-Kiwa Ngarimu (1918–1943), Victoria Cross recipient

== Sports ==
- Jock Aird (1926– ), football player; although born in Scotland, Jock moved to Gisborne.
- Cody Andrews (1987– ), cricketer (Northern Districts)
- Ken Armstrong (1924–1984), football player; although born in England, Ken moved to Gisborne.
- Keith Bagley (1931–1999), rugby union player (All Blacks, Poverty Bay)
- Rowan Barbour (1922–2004), cricketer (Northern Districts)
- Hamish Barton (1976– ), cricketer (Argentina, Auckland, Canterbury) and son of Peter Barton
- Peter Barton (1941– ), cricketer (Northern Districts, Otago) and father of Hamish Barton
- Aron Baynes (1986– ), basketball player (Detroit Pistons, San Antonio Spurs (NBA)) and the Australia men's national basketball team
- Rachel Beale (1985– ), netball player (Waikato Bay of Plenty Magic)
- Grant Bramwell (1961– ), Olympic gold medalist (LA 1984) kayaker
- George Bridge (1995– ), rugby union player (Crusaders, Canterbury)
- James Broadhurst (1987– ), rugby union player (All Blacks, Hurricanes, Taranaki)
- Roger Broughton (1958–2004), cricketer (Northern Districts)
- Shane Cameron (1977– ), boxer
- Mark Carrington (1961– ), cricketer (Northern Districts)
- Bill Carson (1916–1944), cricketer (Black Caps, Auckland) and rugby union player (All Blacks, Auckland)
- Craig Clarke (1983– ), rugby union player (Connacht, Crusaders, Hurricanes, Chiefs)
- Matthew Cooper (1966– ), rugby union player (All Black, Croatia, Highlanders, Chiefs)
- Graeme Dingle (1945– ), outdoor adventurer and mountaineer
- Whetu Douglas (1991– ), rugby union player (Maori All Blacks, Waikato)
- Sandra Edge (1962– ), netball player (Silver Ferns)
- Kelly Evernden (1961– ), tennis player
- Gordon Falcon (1970– ), rugby league (Penrith Panthers) and rugby union player (Maori All Blacks)
- Rory Fallon (1982– ), football player (All Whites, Truro City)
- Darryl Fitzgerald (1990– ), canoeist
- Mosese Fotuaika (1992–2013), rugby league player (West Tigers)
- Hosea Gear (1984– ), rugby union player (All Blacks, Maori All Blacks, Chiefs, Clermont) and brother of Rico Gear
- Rico Gear (1978– ), rugby union player (All Blacks, Maori All Blacks, Kintetsu Liners, Crusaders) and brother of Hosea Gear
- Bernard Graham (1922–1992), cricketer (Auckland)
- Tony Graham (1962– ), cyclist
- Toa Halafihi (1993– ), rugby union player (Hurricanes, Taranaki)
- Tom Heeney (1898–1984), boxer
- Peter Henderson (1926–2014), rugby union (All Blacks, Wanganui) and rugby league player (Huddersfield)
- Peta Hiku (1992– ), rugby league player (Penith Panthers, Manly Sea Eagles, New Zealand Kiwis)
- Cory Hutchings (1972– ), iron man
- Michelle Hyland (1984– ), cyclist
- Andy Jefferd (1953– ), rugby union player (All Blacks, Ngati Porou East Coast, Canterbury)
- Ian Kirkpatrick (1946– ), rugby union player (All Blacks, Canterbury, Poverty Bay)
- Robert Kururangi (1957– ), rugby union player (All Blacks, Maori All Blacks, Counties)
- Jamie Lee (1971– ), cricketer (Northern Districts)
- Gordon Macpherson (1962– ), rugby union player (All Blacks, Otago, Poverty Bay) and coach (Atlanta Renegades, Glasgow Hutchesons Aloysians RFC)
- Sarah Mason (1995– ), surfer
- Guy McGregor (1930– ), field hockey player (Black Sticks)
- Atunaisa Moli (1995– ), rugby union player (Chiefs, Waikato)
- Tom Morrison (1913–1985), rugby union player (All Blacks, Wellington)
- George Nēpia (1905–1986), rugby union player (All Blacks, Ngati Porou East Coast)
- Charlie Ngatai (1990– ), rugby union player (All Blacks, Maori All Blacks, Chiefs)
- Ross Nicholson (1975– ), football player (All Whites, Onehunga Sports)
- Miah Nikora (1985– ), rugby union player (Connacht, Hurricanes)
- Brendon O'Connor (1989– ), rugby union player (Leicester Tigers, Blues)
- Bob O'Dea (1930–1986), rugby union player (All Blacks, Thames Valley)
- Maz Quinn (1976– ), surfer
- William Lee Rees (1836–1912), cricketer (Black Caps) and politician (Liberal)
- Gordon Robertson (1909–1983), cricketer (Otago)
- Grant Robinson (1979– ), cricketer (Northern Districts)
- Victor Simpson (1960– ), rugby union player (Maori All Blacks, Canterbury)
- Graham Sligo (1954– ), field hockey player (1984 New Zealand Olympic Team)
- Harry Tapping (1926–2008), cricketer (Auckland)
- Wai Taumaunu (1962– ), netball player (Silver Ferns)
- Alan Thompson (1959– ), Olympic gold medal kayaker
- Blade Thomson (1990– ), rugby union player (Maori All Blacks, Hurricanes)
- John Turnbull (1935– ), cricketer (Auckland, Northern Districts)
- Des Webb (1934–1987), rugby union player (All Blacks, North Auckland)
- Chris White (1960– ), Olympic bronze medalist rower
- David White (1961– ), cricketer (Northern Districts)
- Richard "Tiny" White (1925–2012), rugby union player (All Blacks, Poverty Bay) & mayor
- John Williams (1941–2007), cricketer (Auckland)

== Business ==
- Bob Berry (1916–2018), dendrologist
- William Douglas Cook (1884–1967), horticulturist
- Bramwell Cook (1903–1994), leader of the New Zealand branch of the Salvation Army
- Lawson Field (1896–1981), farmer and aerial top-dressing pioneer
- Bronwen Holdsworth (1943), businesswoman and arts sponsor
- Rona Hurley (1897–1985), businesswoman
- Robert Kerridge (1901–1979), tourism industrialist
- Eric Partridge (1894–1979), lexicographer
- Bishop Leonard Williams (1829–1916)

== Academics ==
- George Cruickshank (1881–????), bishop
- Reremoana Hakiwai (1889–1981), community leader, cook
- Rongowhakaata Halbert (1894–1973), historian
- William Hamblett (1879–1960), archdeacon
- Vaughan Jones (1952–2020), Fields Medallist, mathematics
- Kingi Areta Keiha (1900–1961), law clerk
- Paul McHugh, lawyer
- Don Merton (1939–2011), conservationist
- Stephen Parke (1950-- ), theoretical physicist
- Rugby Pratt (1875–1946), minister & historian
- Lyn Provost, Controller and Auditor-General
- Allan Pyatt (1916–1991), Bishop of Christchurch
- Hubert Ryburn (1897–1988), minister
- Anne Salmond (1945– ), anthropologist & author
- Jean Mary Sandel (1916–1974), surgeon
- Te Kani te Ua (1892–1966), tribal leader, genealogist
- Alan Ward (1935–2014), historian
- Herbert Williams (1860–1937), bishop
- Hugh Williams (1939– ), judge

== Others ==
- Witi Ihimaera's nephew, Gary Lewis, who is married to Queen Elizabeth II's cousin, Lady Davina Windsor; born in Gisborne
- Terrance John Clark, international criminal and head of a crime syndicate which distributed heroin into New Zealand, Australia and the United Kingdom in the 1970s and 1980s.
- Andrew Witters, co-founder of the musical festival Rhythm & Vines; his family own the vineyard where the festival is hosted
- One or both parents of all three 2013 X-Factor NZ finalists, Whenua Patuwai, Jackie Thomas and Benny Tipene, come from Gisborne.
- 3 News anchorman, Mike McRoberts's father comes from Wairoa.
- Director Lee Tamahori's father comes from Gisborne. Tamahori sent his children to high school in Gisborne.
- John Tamihere's wife, Awerangi Tamihere (nee Durie) (daughter of Professor Mason Durie), comes from the Gisborne area and is a descendant of Thomas Halbert.
- Silver Fern netball captain, Casey Kopua's husband Terry, was born and raised in Gisborne and is also a descendant of Thomas Halbert.
- Russell Crowe's mother's family comes from Reporua and later moved to Manutuke through his Wemyss/Hayes line.
- Actor David de Lautour's father was born and raised in Gisborne before relocating to Christchurch as an adult. His grandparents still live in Gisborne. He is also the great grandson of former Mayor, Cecil de Lautour.
- All Blacks rugby union player, Nehe Milner-Skudder's family are from Gisborne. His mother currently works at Ngata College in Ruatoria.
- Lisa Carrington's family are from Gisborne.
- One of the founding fathers of Gisborne, Thomas Halbert emigrated to New Zealand and lived in Gisborne until his death. He married six times and some of his children include Wi Pere & Kate Wyllie.
- Rugby union player, Bill Cunningham's mother, Hera is from Gisborne. He is also the grandson of Thomas Halbert, nephew of Otene Pitau, Wi Pere and Kate Wyllie and half-brother of fellow rugby player, Moana Paratene.
- While not from Gisborne, William Gisborne is who the city (as well as its sister city in Victoria, Australia) is named after.
- Richmal Oates-Whitehead, gained notoriety after she pretended to be a doctor during the aftermath of the 7/7 attacks in London.
