= Mason Durie (psychiatrist) =

New Zealand professor of Māori studies

Sir Mason Durie ONZ KNZM FRANZCP
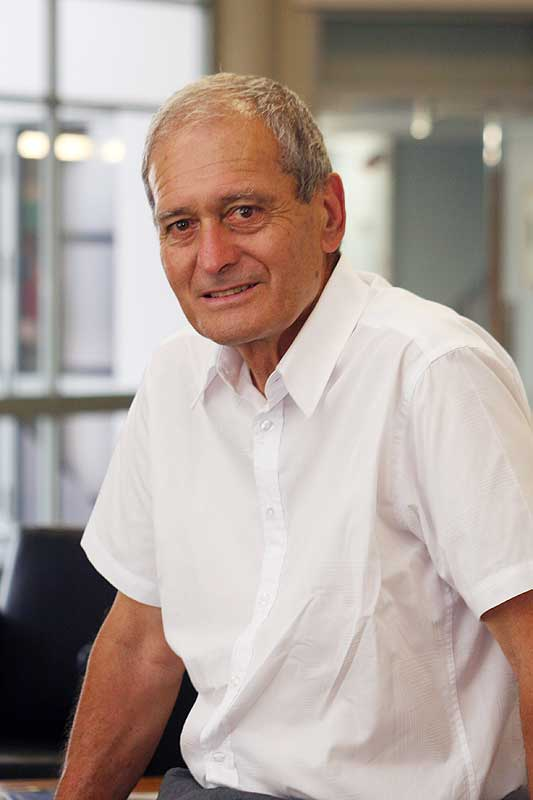
- Durie in 2010
- Born: Mason Harold Durie; 4 December 1938 (age 87)
- Education: University of Otago (MBChB); McGill University (GradDipPsych)
- Scientific career
- Fields: Psychiatry
- Institutions: Massey University
- Doctoral students: Bob Jahnke

Sir Mason Harold Durie ONZ KNZM FRANZCP (born 4 December 1938) is a New Zealand professor of Māori Studies and research academic at Massey University. He is known for his contributions to Māori health. In 2020, he was appointed to the Order of New Zealand, the highest honour in New Zealand's royal honours system.

== Early life and family ==
Durie has affiliations with the Rangitāne, Ngāti Kauwhata and Ngāti Raukawa iwi (tribes) of New Zealand. He grew up in Feilding and attended Te Aute College in Hawke's Bay. John Mason Durie was his grandfather, and he is the older brother of former High Court judge and chief judge of the Māori Land Court, Sir Eddie Durie. He married Arohia Kōhere, granddaughter of Rēweti Kōhere. One of his daughters, Awerangi, is married to politician and radio personality John Tamihere, while his eldest son, Meihana, is working on producing a movie about Rēweti Kōhere's brother, Hēnare Kōhere. His wife and their children are also descendants of Gisborne founding father Thomas Halbert and his fifth wife, Kaikiri.

== Education ==
Durie graduated from the University of Otago with a Bachelor of Medicine and Bachelor of Surgery in 1963. He has a Postgraduate Diploma in Psychiatry from McGill University, Canada, and was Director of Psychiatry at Palmerston North Hospital before his appointment to the Royal Commission on Social Policy from 1986 to 1988.

== Achievements ==
For over 40 years, he has been at the forefront of a transformational approach to Māori health and has played major roles in building the Māori health workforce. His efforts have been recognised by the Royal Australian and New Zealand College of Psychiatrists, the Public Health Association of New Zealand, the Māori Medical Practitioners Association, the Thoracic Society of Australia and New Zealand, and the Polynesian Society.

In addition to a lifelong commitment to Māori health, Durie also championed higher education for Māori. As Deputy Chair of Te Wānanga o Raukawa, Professor of Māori Research and Development, and more recently Deputy Vice-Chancellor at Massey University, he continues to provide national academic leadership for Māori and indigenous development and regularly assists iwi and Māori communities to realise their own aspirations for socio-economic advancement.

Apart from serving on the Boards of Te Papa and the Foundation for Research Science and Technology, Durie has been Chair of the Guardians Group for the Secondary Futures project, and a Commissioner for the New Zealand Families Commission. He chaired the Ministerial Taskforce on Whānau Ora and was also Chair of Te Kāhui Amokura, a Standing Committee of the New Zealand Vice-Chancellors' Committee.

In 1990, Durie was awarded the New Zealand 1990 Commemoration Medal. In 2002, he was awarded a Doctor of Literature from Massey University and in 2008 received an Honorary Doctor of Laws from Otago University. Professor Durie is a Fellow of the Royal Australian and New Zealand College of Psychiatrists, a Fellow of the Royal Society of New Zealand, and a Fellow of the Humanities Council of New Zealand Academy. He has published widely and has regularly presented keynote addresses at iwi, national and international conferences.

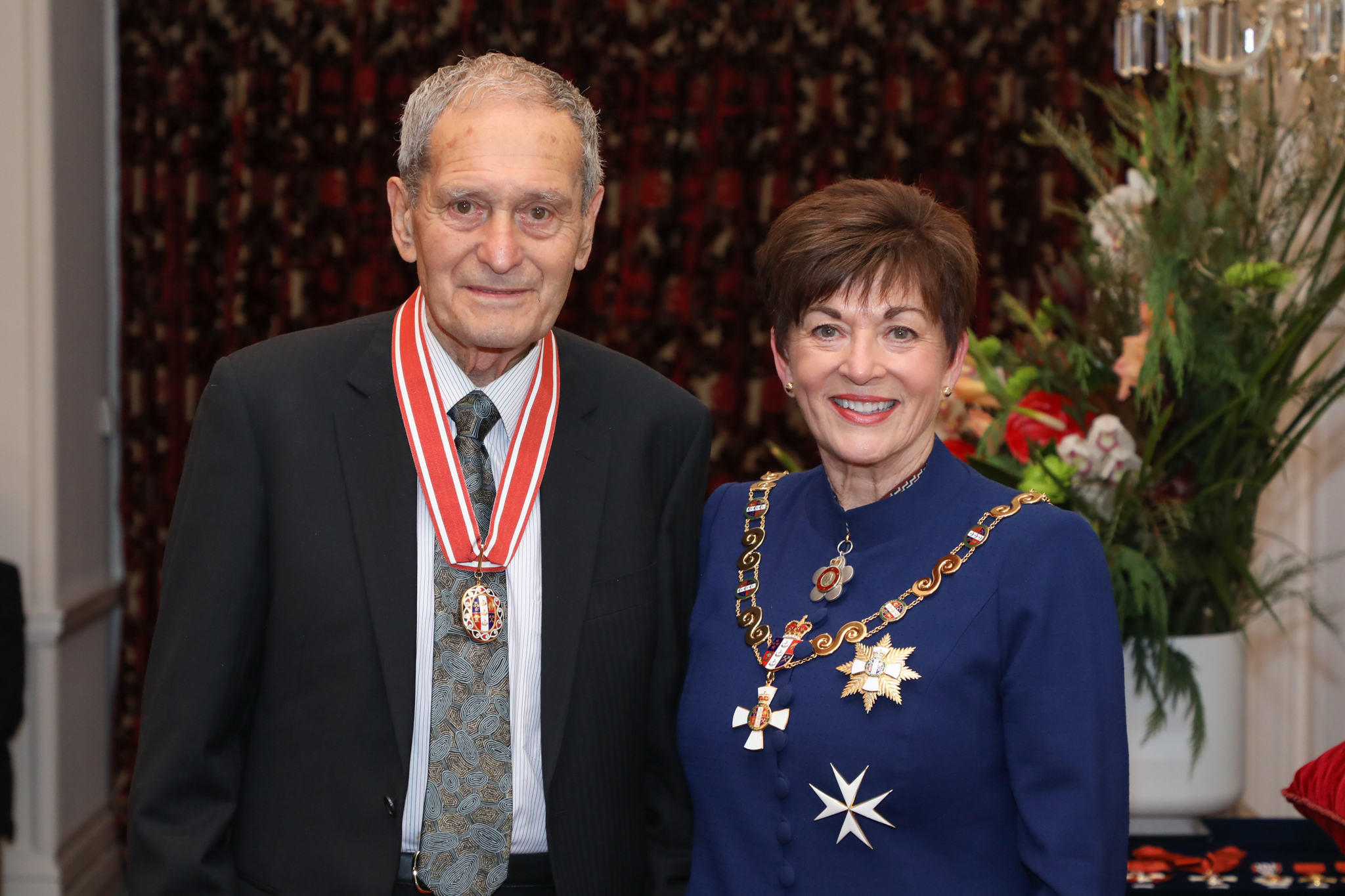
Durie (left), after his investiture as a Member of the Order of New Zealand, by the governor-general, Dame Patsy Reddy, at Government House, Wellington, on 3 May 2021

In the 2001 New Year Honours, Durie was appointed a Companion of the New Zealand Order of Merit, for services to Māori. In the 2010 New Year Honours, he was promoted to Knight Companion of the same order, for services to Māori health, in particular public health services. In the 2021 New Year Honours, Durie was appointed to the Order of New Zealand for services to New Zealand.

In 2012 the Royal Society Te Apārangi inaugurated the Mason Durie Medal awarded to a leading social scientist in his honour.

== Current work ==
Durie is Emeritus Professor of Māori Research & Development at Massey University.

== Publications ==
- Durie, Mason (1998). Te Mana, Te Kawanatanga The Politics of Maori Self-Determination. Oxford University Press. ISBN 9780195583670.
- Durie, Mason (1994). Whaiora, Maori Health Development. Oxford University Press. ISBN 9780195583168.
- Durie, Mason (1998). Whaiora, Maori Health Development (2nd ed.). Oxford University Press. ISBN 9780195584035.
- Durie, Mason (2001). Mauri Ora, The Dynamics of Maori Health. Oxford University Press. ISBN 978-0-19-558418-9.
- Durie, Mason (2003). Nga Kahui Pou, Launching Maori Futures. Huia Pub. ISBN 978-1-877283-98-7.
- Durie, Mason (2005). Nga Tai Matatu: Tides of Maori Endurance. Oxford University Press. ISBN 978-0-19-558468-4.
