= Arohia Durie =

New Zealand professor of Māori education

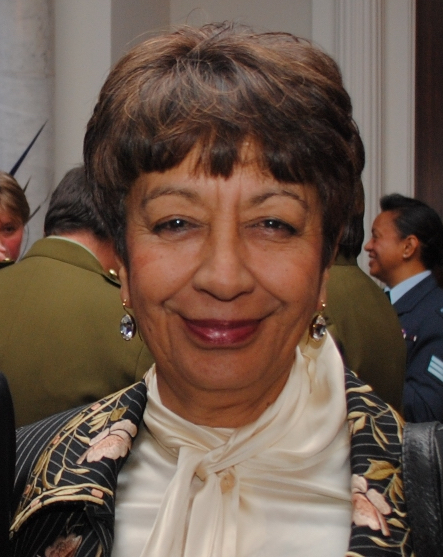
- Durie in 2011
- Born: Arohia Ernestine Kōhere
- Spouse: Mason Durie
- Relatives: Eddie Durie (brother-in-law); John Tamihere (son-in-law); Rēweti Kōhere (grandfather); Hēnare Kōhere (great-uncle); Mōkena Kōhere (great-great-grandfather)
- Awards: Herbison Lecture

Academic background
- Education: Massey University
- Thesis: Te rērenga o te rā: autonomy and identity: Māori educational aspirations (2002)
- Doctoral advisor: John Codd, Richard Harker

Arohia Ernestine, Lady Durie (née Kōhere) is a New Zealand Māori educationalist. She was the first professor of Māori education at Massey University, where she was appointed full professor in 2001. Durie led the development of the first te reo Māori immersion graduate course. She retired from the university before or during 2010. Durie's husband is psychiatrist Mason Durie, and their son, Meihana, is also a professor at Massey University.

== Early life and education ==
Durie was born Arohia Ernestine Kōhere, and raised at Rangiata Station, near East Cape. Her parents were Kākatārau Kohere, who was a farmer and kaitiaki of the family's land, and Lorraine Kohere, who was from the South Island, and came to the area as a schoolteacher at East Cape School. Her paternal grandfather was Rēweti Kōhere. Durie completed a PhD at Massey University in 2002.

Durie affiliates to Ngāti Porou, Ngāi Tahu, and Rongowhakaata iwi. She is married to psychiatrist Mason Durie, and her son Meihana Durie is also a professor of education at Massey University.

== Academic career ==
Durie is a Māori educationalist. She was appointed head of Te Uru Māraurau, the Māori and Multicultural Education School at Massey University, in 1997. Durie and Huia Jahnke were responsible for creating the curriculum for the first graduate immersion course in te reo Māori, the teacher education degree programme Te Aho Tātairangi. In 2001, Durie was appointed the university's first professor of Māori education. She retired from the university before or during 2010.

Durie was invited to give the Herbison Lecture, in memory of Dame Jean Herbison, at the 2002 New Zealand Association for Research in Education conference. Her lecture was titled "Whakamua Whakamuri Māori research".

== Selected works ==
- Arohia Durie (1998). "Emancipatory Maori Education: Speaking from the Heart". Language, Culture and Curriculum. 11 (3): 297–308. doi:10.1080/07908319808666558. Wikidata Q126047677.
- Arohia Durie (2003). "Curriculum Framing". set Research Information for Teachers (2): 17. doi:10.18296/set.0697. Wikidata Q126077491.
- Huia Tomlins-Jahnke and Arohia Durie (2008) Whanau socialisation through everyday talk a pilot study. Wellington N.Z. Families Commission. Blue Skies Report 22. ISBN 9780478328073
- Report on the evaluation of the 'Tihe Mauri Ora' teacher development contract
- Pania Te Whāiti, Marie McCarthy, Arohia Durie.(1997) Mai i Rangiatea. Auckland N.Z.: Auckland University Press: Bridget Williams Books. ISBN 9781869401351
- Arohia Durie (2010). The Pacific Way, chapter in Weeping Waters: The Treaty of Waitangi and Constitutional Change. Huia Publishers. ISBN 9781869694043
