= Bill Cunningham (rugby union, born 1874) =

NZ international rugby union player (1874–1927)

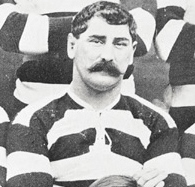
- Bill Cunningham in 1904
- Born: William Cunningham; 8 July 1874 Te Awamutu, New Zealand
- Died: 3 September 1927 (aged 53) Auckland, New Zealand
- Notable relative(s): Reremoana Hakiwai (sister); Rēweti Kōhere (brother-in-law); Wi Pere (uncle); Ōtene Pītau (uncle); Kate Wyllie (aunt); Thomas Halbert (grandfather)
- Occupation(s): Axeman, miner, freezing works labourer

Rugby union career
- Position: Lock
Amateur team(s)
Years	Team	Apps	(Points)
- Waihi West
–	City (Auckland)		
–	Ponsonby		
Provincial / State sides
Years	Team	Apps	(Points)
1899–1913	Auckland	45	
- Goldfields sub-union
1902, 1908	North Island		
International career
Years	Team	Apps	(Points)
1901–08	New Zealand	39	(22)
1910–12	New Zealand Māori		

William Cunningham (8 July 1874 – 3 September 1927) was a New Zealand rugby union player who represented New Zealand—known as the All Blacks—between 1901 and 1908. Most notably he toured with the Original All Blacks on their 1905–06 tour of the British Isles, France and North America. They were the first New Zealand representative team to visit the British Isles, and of their 32 matches there Cunningham played in 23. He played mainly at lock, and was added to the touring party due to his strong scrummaging ability. He played in three Test matches during the trip: against Scotland, Ireland and France, but did not play in the loss to Wales due to injury, the All Blacks' only defeat on tour.

Born near Te Awamutu, Cunningham originally played club rugby in Waihi, in the Coromandel region. Lying within the Auckland Rugby Football Union's boundaries, he was selected to play for Auckland province in 1899 and continued to represent the side until his retirement in 1913. He was first picked for New Zealand in 1901, and played against New South Wales that year, but was not selected again until the 1905 Originals' tour. After the tour he continued to represent New Zealand in both 1907 and 1908. Affiliating to Rongowhakaata, he was a member of the first ever New Zealand Māori team in 1910, and played for them again in 1912. On retirement in 1913 he had appeared for Auckland 45 times, and for New Zealand 39—both large numbers for the time.

== Early life and family ==
Born at Rangiaowhia, near Te Awamutu, on 8 July 1874, Cunningham was the son of Hera (Sarah) Ngaihika Halbert and her second husband, James Cunningham. Hera was the daughter of Thomas Halbert, a whaler and trader who landed in Poverty Bay in about 1832, and his fifth wife, Keita Kaikiri, who belonged to the Rongowhakaata iwi. Hera later remarried Paratene Tatae, a cousin of Te Kooti: their daughters included Reremoana Hakiwai, and Keita Kaikiri Paratene, who married Rēweti Kōhere.

Cunningham married Ethel Minnie Dance of Waihi on 23 September 1907. The same year, Ethel gave birth to their son, William Henry Cunningham, however he died at only a day old. This was the only child the couple had.

== Early career ==
Cunningham first played representative rugby union for Auckland province in 1899. He was selected from his club Waihi West (a club in Waihi on the Coromandel Peninsula), which was affiliated to the Goldfield subunion. At the time the Goldfields Rugby Union was a subunion of the Auckland Rugby Football Union, but its constituent clubs are now affiliated to the Thames Valley Rugby Football Union.

He was first selected to play for New Zealand in 1901, and played against Wellington and the New South Wales team that was touring New Zealand at the time. Both matches were comfortably won, with the tourists defeated 20–3. Cunningham played his first of four matches for Auckland against international opposition, against the same New South Wales side a week later, with his Auckland team winning 24–3.

Cunningham moved to Auckland in 1902, and played his club rugby for City, before joining Ponsonby the following season. He had been displaced from the national team by this time, with Cantabrian Bernard Fanning preferred at lock. The New Zealanders used a different scrum formation than seen today, and only one lock was ever required.

Despite not being selected for New Zealand in 1904, Cunningham continued to appear for Auckland, and played in two particularly notable matches that season. In 1904 the first Ranfurly Shield match was played. The shield, a provincial challenge trophy won by defeating the holder, was to become the most prestigious trophy in domestic New Zealand rugby. Due to their unmatched provincial record at the time Auckland were awarded the shield. The first shield challenge was played against Wellington, who were not expected to pose much of a threat. Auckland had not lost at home in six years, but, with Cunningham in the side, Auckland lost 6–3. The second notable match that season was against the touring British Isles who were conducting a tour of Australia and New Zealand. The Aucklanders defeated the British Isles side 13–0, with Cunningham scoring a try and contributing significantly to the dominance of his team's forwards.

== Original All Blacks ==
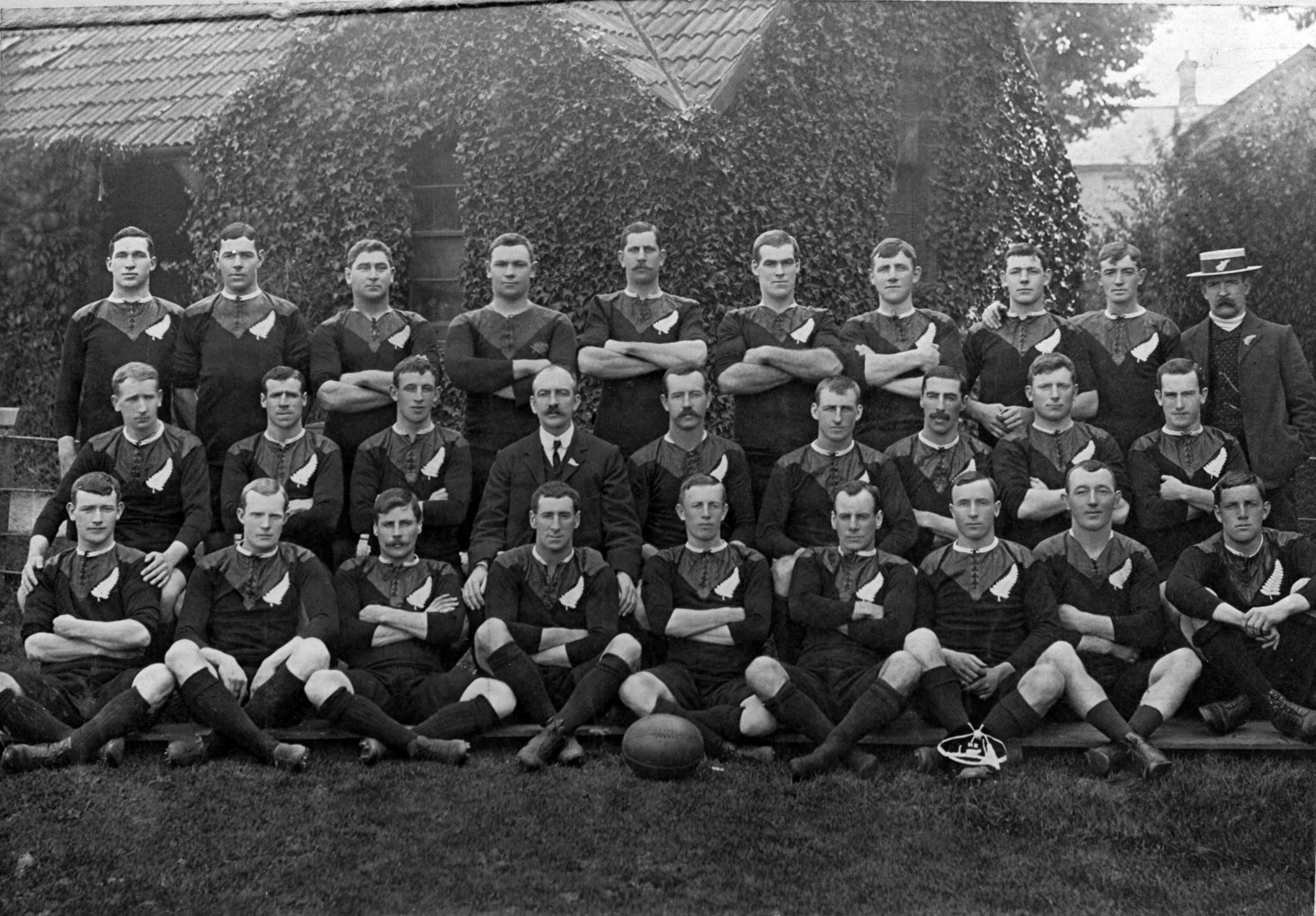
Cunningham and the other Original All Blacks that toured the British Isles, France and the United States during 1905–06. The team won 34 of their 35 tour matches. Cunningham is standing in the back row, third from left.

The first ever tour of a New Zealand representative team to the British Isles was planned for 1905, and a preliminary tour of Australia and New Zealand was undertaken to help fund the tour. Cunningham was not in the original touring squad, and so played for Auckland against New Zealand. According to Winston McCarthy, New Zealand's forwards were at "sixes and sevens mainly through want of a good lock." Following the conclusion of the preliminary tour of Australia and New Zealand it was clear that a specialist lock forward needed to be added to the side. Fanning, who had kept Cunningham out of the New Zealand side in 1903 and 1904, had retired following the 1904 season and consequently Cunningham did enough to earn selection as the team's only specialist lock.

The team departed aboard the Rimutaka and during the voyage conducted training drills on the ship's deck; for this the forwards were coached by the team's captain, Dave Gallaher, with help from Cunningham. Vice-captain and first five-eighth Billy Stead was in charge of the backs, and consequently the services of the New Zealand Rugby Union-appointed coach Jimmy Duncan were not used.

After a six-week voyage, the team arrived in Plymouth, England on 8 September 1905. After finally arriving in England, the side opened their tour against Devon. Cunningham played in the match which was won easily by the New Zealanders 55–4. Devon were expected to pose a serious challenge, but were overwhelmed and only managed to score a drop-kick. A series of large victories followed against domestic opposition throughout England, and by the time the All Blacks played their first Test match against Scotland, the team had played and won nineteen matches, and scored 612 points while conceding only 15.

When time for the Scotland Test did arrive, it was discovered that as the ground had not been covered for protection from the elements, and had frozen over. The Scotland Football Union wanted to abandon the match, but Gallaher and the tour manager George Dixon contended that the weather would improve enough for the pitch to thaw, and the match was eventually allowed to proceed. The Test was closely contested, with Scotland leading 7–6 at half-time, but the All Blacks scored two late tries, including one to Cunningham, to win 12–7; (Note: New Zealand scored four tries (worth three points each), and Scotland a try and drop-goal (worth four points).) despite the close score-line, the New Zealanders were clearly the better of the two sides.

Cunningham was selected for the Ireland match a week later. The fixture was won 15–0 by New Zealand in front of 12,000 people at Landsdowne Road. The tourists then returned to England, where they defeated England 15–0 at Crystal Palace, but Cunningham was not selected due to injury. He was still injured for the Wales Test, and this may have contributed to New Zealand's defeat. The 3–0 loss, the New Zealander's first of the tour, was narrow and controversial, and according to team manager Dixon, "New Zealand suffered by the absence from the team of G. W. [George] Smith, W. Cunningham, and J. W. [Billy] Stead."

Cunningham recovered to play the team's final Test, against France in Paris, where he played as "breakaway" (flanker) rather than his usual position of lock. His last two tour matches were against British Columbia during the American leg of the tour, after which the side returned to New Zealand. The "Original All Blacks"—as the team is now known—had played 35 games and lost only once. Over their 32 matches in the British Isles, of which Cunninghham had played 23, New Zealand scored 830 points and conceded 39; overall they scored 976 points and conceded only 59. On their arrival back in New Zealand on 6 March 1906, the All Blacks were welcomed by a crowd of 10,000 before being hosted at a civic reception in Auckland. The 1905–06 Originals are remembered as perhaps the greatest of All Black sides, and set the standard for all their successors. They introduced a number of innovations to Britain and Ireland, including specialised forward positions and unfamiliar variations in attacking plays.

== Later career ==
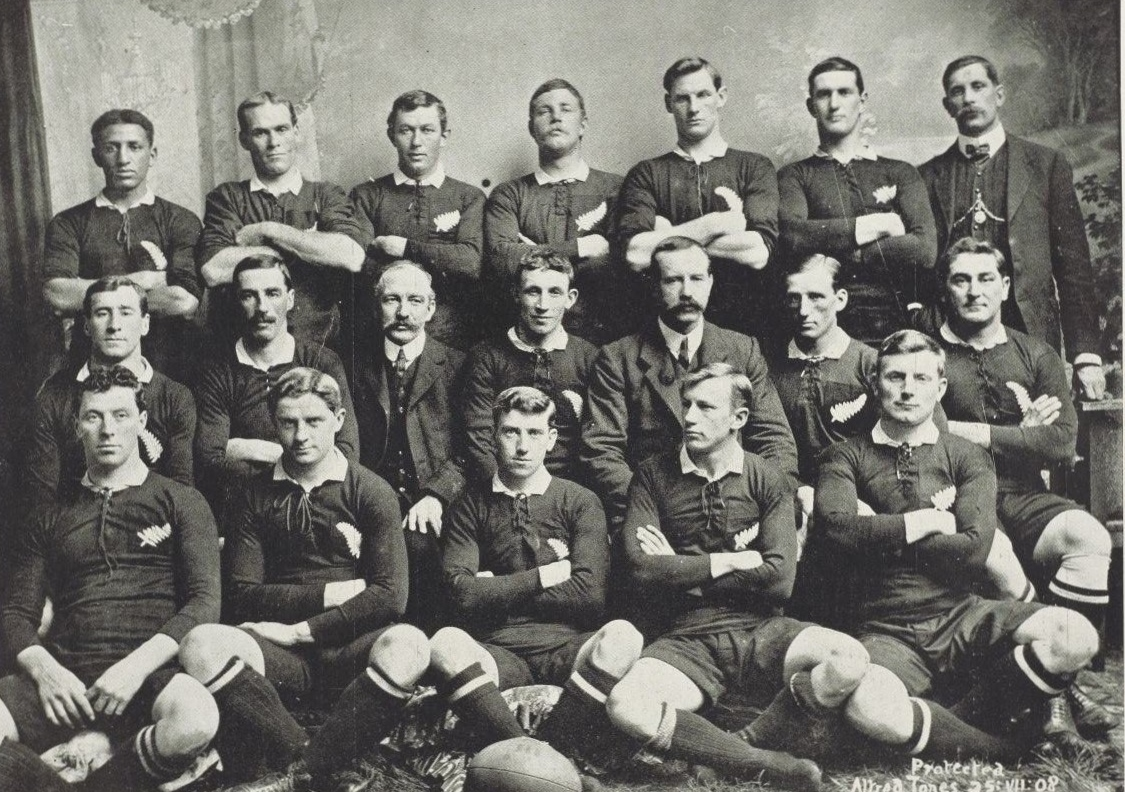
The 1908 New Zealand side that played the touring Anglo-Welsh. Cunningham is seated in the middle row on the far right.

Cunningham continued to play for Auckland on his return from the Originals' tour. They had regained the Ranfurly Shield in 1905, and he played in a number of shield defences over the subsequent seasons. He was selected for the New Zealand team that toured Australia in 1907 where he played seven matches, including all three Tests against Australia. He was again selected for the All Blacks in 1908, this time to play the touring Anglo-Welsh team, and played in all three Tests. This was his last appearance for New Zealand, which gave him 39 appearances for his national team, including 9 Test matches. He was later selected for the inaugural New Zealand Māori team (now called the Māori All Blacks) on their 1910 tour of Australia, and again for another tour in 1912.

He continued to play for Auckland until 1913. This period included two more matches against international opposition: a victory over the 1908 Anglo-Welsh side 11–0, and a defeat of Australia in 1913. Auckland had held the Ranfurly Shield throughout this time, and had endured a number of close shield challenges during their reign. They had 23 successful shield defenses before they faced Taranaki on 16 August 1913. In the match Taranaki scored a converted try (worth five points at the time) four minutes from full-time to end Auckland's shield reign. Cunningham had played in 16 of Auckland's 24 shield matches during their tenure. He retired from provincial rugby at the end of that season.

== Personal life and playing style ==
Cunningham was very physically fit and strong, and was "remarkably agile" according to writer Matt Elliott. He was very popular with his teammates and possessed a good sense of humour. Like Billy Stead, the other Māori in the 1905–06 All Black side, Cunningham was able to speak the language. Outside of rugby he spent his early working-life as an axeman, and spent some time as a miner before later working for the Auckland Harbour Board. At the time of his death he was working at an Auckland freezing works.

== Death and legacy ==
Cunningham died suddenly from acute meningitis at Auckland in September 1927, and his funeral was attended by a number of dignitaries, including representatives of the New Zealand, Auckland, New South Wales and Thames Rugby Unions. His pallbearers were all former All Blacks, and included fellow Original All Blacks George Tyler, George Nicholson and George Gillett. After his casket had been lowered into its grave at Hillsborough Cemetery, an Auckland representative jersey was thrown on top.

Under the average height on a line-out, yet no man ever beat him, a genius in scrum, no need to tell him when to keep the ball or let it out. Am I wrong in saying that his death removes the greatest lock the Dominion [of New Zealand] ever possessed? He had three intuitions as far back as November 1904 [sic], that Wales would beat us, that war would occur between England and Germany within ten years, and that he would not live to get the old age pension. How lamentably true. How hard to write the innate qualities of this Nature's gentleman, a hard but clean player, respected and appreciated by opponents, and adored by his intimates. He goes West leaving us the poorer by his departure.

— Billy Stead, The Auckland Star, 6 September 1927

== Sources ==
Books and newspapers

- "A Great "Lock"". The Evening Post. 5 September 1927. p. 9.
- "Death of an All Black—Mr W. Cunningham". The New Zealand Herald. 5 September 1927. p. 10.
- Elliott, Matt (2012). Dave Gallaher—The Original All Black Captain (paperback). London: Harper Collins. ISBN 978-1-86950-968-2.
- "Football Funeral—Buried with his Colours". The Auckland Star. 5 September 1927. p. 5.
- "Interprovincial Match—Auckland v. New South Wales". The New Zealand Herald. 9 September 1901. p. 3.
- "Local and General News". Thames Star. 2 October 1907. p. 2.
- McCarthy, Winston (1968). Haka! The All Blacks Story. London: Pelham Books.
- McLean, Terry (1987). New Zealand Rugby Legends. Auckland, New Zealand: MOA Publications. ISBN 0-908570-15-5.
- Stead, Billy (6 September 1927). "A Great Player—Tribute to W. Cunningham". The Auckland Star. p. 15.
- Verdon, Paul (2000). Born to Lead—The Untold Story of the All Black Test Captains. Auckland, New Zealand: Celebrity Books. ISBN 1-877252-05-0.

Web

- "4th All Black Test". allblacks.com. NZRU.
- "5th All Black Test". allblacks.com. NZRU.
- "56th All Black Game". allblacks.com. NZRU.
- Cerberuscoins (14 September 2014). "Descendents of Thomas Halbert 1806–1865". Wordpress.com.
- "Habana downs hapless Wallabies". scrum.com. ESPN.
- Hakiwai, Arapata (8 October 2013). "Hakiwai, Reremoana". Dictionary of New Zealand Biography.
- "History". thamesvalleyswampfoxes.co.nz. Thames Valley Rugby Football Union. Archived from the original on 28 August 2015.
- Kohere, Rarawa (20 October 2012). "Kohere, Reweti Tuhorouta". Dictionary of New Zealand Biography.
- Knight, Lindsay. "Bill Cunningham". allblacks.com. New Zealand Rugby Museum.
- "Marriage search – use Cunningham in 'Groom's family name' field, and 23/9/1907 in 'Search from date' and 'Search to date' fields". Internal Affairs.
- "Provincial competitions". Ministry for Culture and Heritage. 20 December 2012. Archived from the original on 31 July 2016.
- Swan, Arthur (1966). "Ranfurly Shield". In McLintock, A. H. (ed.). An Encyclopaedia of New Zealand. Te Ara – the Encyclopedia of New Zealand.
- "The 1905/06 'Originals'". New Zealand Rugby Museum.
- "Birth search – use Cunningham in 'Given name' and William Henry in 'Family Name' and 'Ethel' in 'Mother's name' field, and 01/01/1907 in 'Search from date' and 'Search to date' fields". Internal Affairs.
- "Death search – use Cunningham in 'Given name' and William Henry in 'Family Name' field, and 01/01/1907 in 'Search from date' and 'Search to date' fields". Internal Affairs.
