= Edward Harris =

Edward Harris may refer to:

- Edward Harris (North Carolina judge) (1763–1813), lawyer, politician, and judge
- Edward Harris (ornithologist) (1799–1863), introduced the Percheron horse to America; associate of John James Audubon; amateur naturalist
- Edward Harris (Royal Navy officer) (1808–1888), British naval commander, diplomat and politician
- Edward Francis Harris (1834–1898), New Zealand public servant, interpreter, landowner and genealogist
- Edward Harris, 4th Earl of Malmesbury (1842–1899), son of the above
- Edward A. Harris (1910–1976), American journalist and Pulitzer Prize winner
- Edward Harris (archaeologist), archaeologist and director of the Bermuda Maritime Museum
- Edward Harris (Rhode Island politician) (1801–1872), wool manufacturer, abolitionist, temperance supporter, and philanthropist
- Edward F. Harris (1909–1983), American politician in the state of Washington
- Edward Harris (Irish judge) (1575–1636), English born judge and politician
- Eddie Harris (1934–1996), jazz musician
- Eddie Harris (footballer) (1879–1966), Australian rules footballer
- Ed Harris (born 1950), American actor
- Ed Harris (politician) (born c. 1965), San Diego city councilman
- Ed Harris (playwright)

== See also ==
- Ted Harris (disambiguation)
- James Edward Harris, 2nd Earl of Malmesbury (1778–1841), British peer
- Dud Harris, American football player born 1903
