= Hoani (given name) =

Hoani is a given name. It is a Māori transliteration of the name John or Johnny. Notable people with the name include:

- Hoani MacDonald (born 1978), New Zealand rugby player
- Hoani Matenga (born 1987), New Zealand rugby player and musician
- Hoani Meihana Te Rangiotū (died 1898), New Zealand tribal leader and peacemaker
- Hoani Nahe (c. 1833–1894), Māori historian and author
- Hoani Paraone Tunuiarangi (1843–1933), New Zealand tribal leader, guide, interpreter, assessor, politician, and writer
- Hoani Raena, better known as Pātuki (died 1900), New Zealand Māori leader, whaler, goldminer and storekeeper
- Hoani Taipua (1839/1840–1896), New Zealand politician
- Hoani Te Heuheu Tūkino VI (1897–1944), New Zealand tribal leader and trust board chairman
- Hoani Te Whatahoro Jury (1841–1923), New Zealand scholar, recorder, and interpreter
- Hoani Tui (born 1984), New Zealand rugby union player
- Hoani Waititi (1926–1965), New Zealand teacher and community leader
- Hoani Wiremu Hīpango (c. 1820–1865), New Zealand Māori leader
- Wiremu Hoani Taua (1862–1919), New Zealand tribal leader and school principal
