= Ngāti Tūkoko =

Ngāti Tūkoko may also refer to:

- Ngāti Tūkoko (Ngāti Kahungunu), a Ngāti Kahungunu sub-tribe
- Ngāi Tahu (Rangitāne), a Rangitāne sub-tribe
