= Mason Durie (community leader) =

New Zealand community leader, public servant and farmer (1889–1971)

Mason Durie OBE
- Born: John Mason Durie; 1 July 1889; Aorangi, New Zealand
- Died: 20 April 1971 (aged 81); Aorangi, New Zealand
- Relatives: Hoani Meihana Te Rangiotū (grandfather); Eddie Durie (grandson); Mason Durie (grandson)

John Mason Durie OBE (1 July 1889 – 20 April 1971) was a New Zealand tribal leader, interpreter, public servant, farmer, and community leader.

== Background ==
Of Māori descent, he identified with the Ngāti Kauwhata and Rangitāne iwi. He was born in Aorangi, in the Manawatū, in 1889. Durie died on 20 April 1971 in the same house he was born in. Eddie Durie and Mason Durie are his grandsons.
