= Ngāti Te Hina =

Ngāti Te Hina may refer to:

- Ngāti Te Hina (Ngāti Kahungunu), a Ngāti Kahungunu sub-tribe
- Ngāti Te Hina (Rangitāne), a Rangitāne sub-tribe
