= Kevin Brady (public servant) =

New Zealand politician

Kevin Brady CNZM
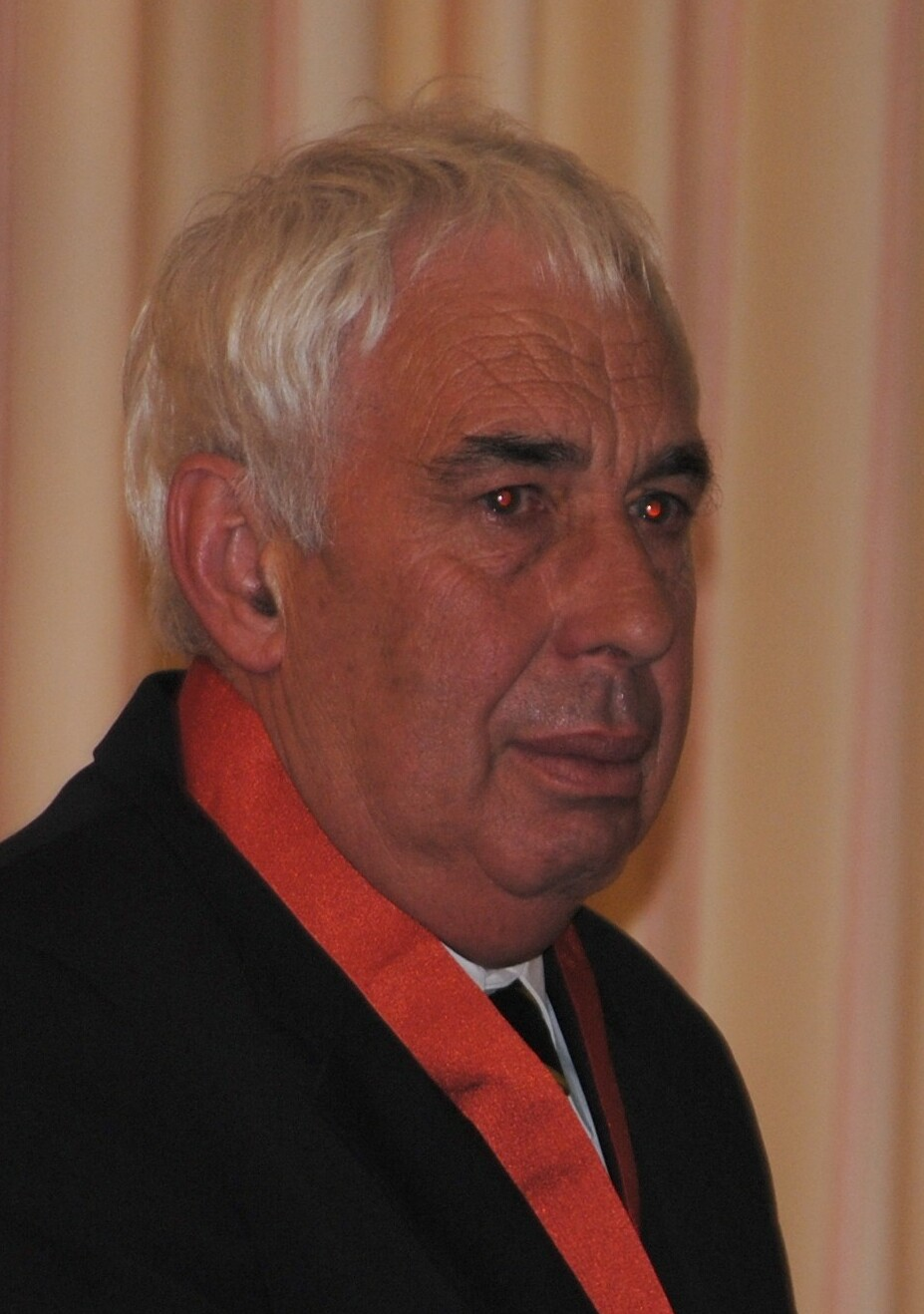
- Brady in 2010

17th Controller and Auditor-General
- In office 2002–2009
- Preceded by: David Macdonald
- Succeeded by: Lyn Provost

Personal details
- Born: Kevin Bernard Brady; 24 July 1947 (age 77); Oamaru, New Zealand
- Occupation: Accountant

Kevin Bernard Brady CNZM (born 14 June 1947) is a former New Zealand public servant. He was the Controller and Auditor-General of New Zealand from 2002 until 2009.

== Biography ==
Brady was born in Oamaru and was employed in the Audit Office from 1971. He is a chartered accountant and holds a Master of Public Policy degree from Victoria University of Wellington.

In a report tabled in 2006, Brady found that $1.17 million of taxpayer-funded parliamentary funding was misspent. He stated that the New Zealand Labour Party had wrongly spent $768,000, and six other political parties had misspent lesser amounts. Helen Clark, the prime minister and Labour Party leader, accused the Brady of smearing the reputation of her party and others. Brady was named one of 2007 New Zealanders of the Year by The New Zealand Herald, mainly for his stand on election spending.

In the 2010 New Year Honours, Brady was appointed a Companion of the New Zealand Order of Merit, for public services.
