= Ngāi Tahu (disambiguation) =

Ngāi Tahu is a Māori tribe in southern New Zealand.

Ngāi Tahu may also refer to:

- Ngāi Tahu (Ngāti Kahungunu), a Ngāti Kahungunu sub-tribe
- Ngāi Tahu (Rangitāne), a Rangitāne sub-tribe
