= Richmal =

Richmal is an unusual English first name which may refer to:

- Richmal Crompton, full name Richmal Crompton Lamburn (1890–1969), a British author
- Richmal Mangnall (1769–1820), an English schoolmistress and author
- Richmal Oates-Whitehead (1970–2005), a fabulist associated with the 7 July 2005 London attacks
