= Gordon Robertson =

Gordon Robertson may refer to:

- Gordon P. Robertson (born 1958), co-host on The 700 Club from 1999 to 2021 and main host since 2021
- Gordon Robertson (cricketer) (1909-1983), New Zealand cricketer
- Gordon Robertson (ice hockey) (born 1926), Canadian ice hockey player

== See also ==
- Robert Gordon Robertson (1917–2013), Commissioner of the Northwest Territories
- Gordon Robertson Cameron (1921–2010), businessman and former political figure in the Yukon, Canada
