= Rēweti Kōhere =

New Zealand clergyman, journalist, writer, historian (1871–1954)

Rēweti Tūhorouta Kōhere
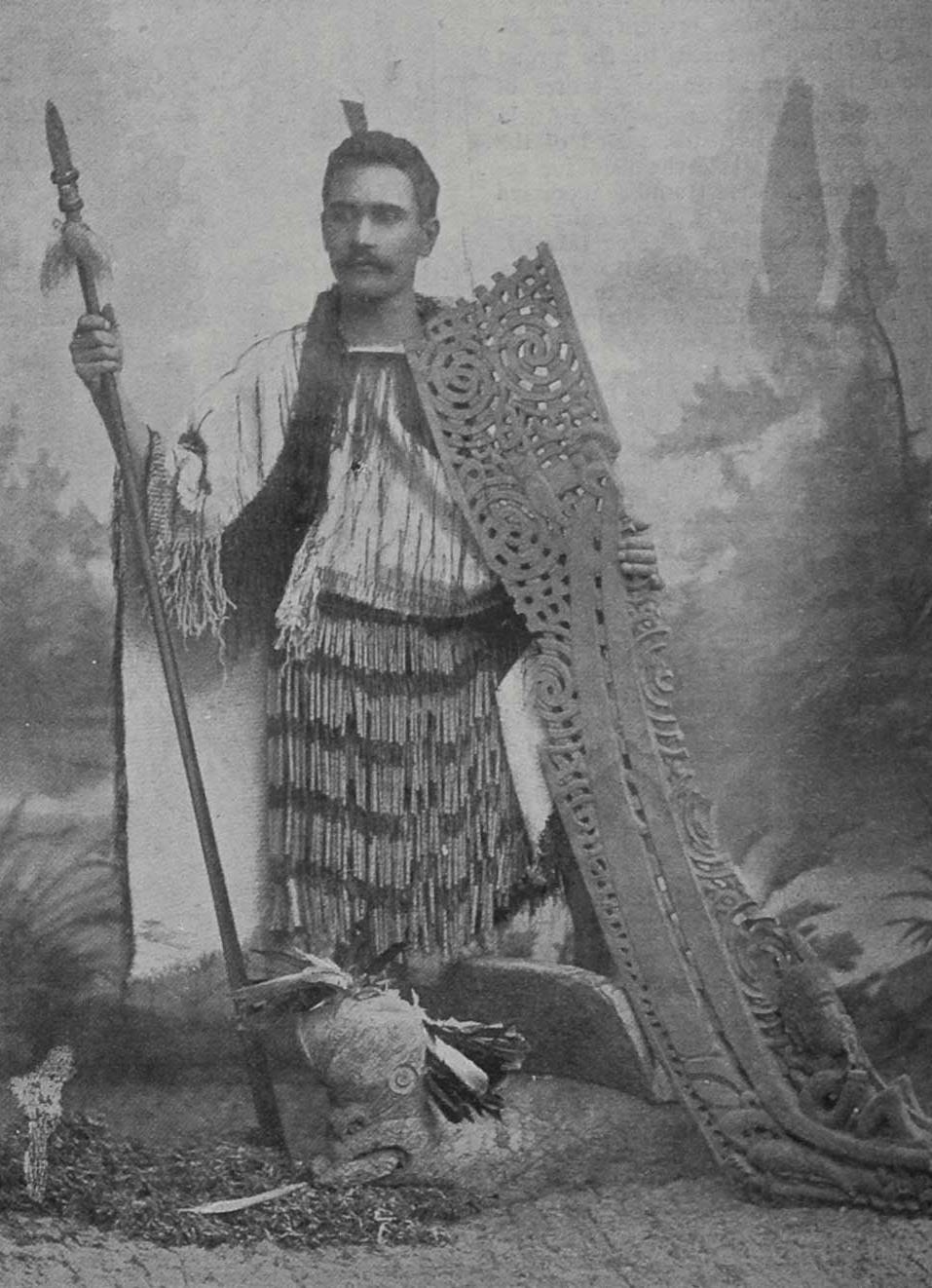
- Born: 11 April 1871; Orutua, Horoera, East Coast, New Zealand
- Died: 9 August 1954 (aged 83); Rangiata, near East Cape
- Occupations: Anglican minister, journalist, farmer, community leader
- Spouse: Keita Kaikiri Paratene (m. 1904)
- Relatives: Mōkena Kōhere (father); Hēnare Kōhere (brother); Arohia Durie (granddaughter)

Rēweti Tūhorouta Kōhere (11 April 1871 – 9 August 1954) was a New Zealand Anglican clergyman, newspaper journalist and editor, farmer, writer, historian. Of Māori descent, he identified with the Ngāti Porou iwi.

== Early life and education ==
Kōhere was born in Orutua, East Coast, New Zealand on 11 April 1871. His parents were Hone Hiki Kōhere and Henerata Bristow (sometimes noted as Peretō), and his grandfather was Mōkena Kōhere. His brothers were Hēnare Kōhere and the Reverend Canon Poihipi Mōkena Kōhere of Tikitiki.

After early years of schooling at Māori schools on the East Coast, he became fluent in English when he attended Gisborne School from 1885 to 1887. He then attended Te Aute College, where he graduated as the Dux of the school and qualified for university by passing the matriculation examination in 1890.

== Career ==
In 1891 he joined the teaching staff at Te Aute College. He attended Canterbury College for three years from 1892, although he did not complete the BA degree course. He was assistant tutor at Te Rau Kahikatea Theological College from 1898 to 1908. In 1899 he was appointed editor of the Anglican church newspaper Te Pipiwharauroa.

On 14 December 1904 he married Keita Paratene, daughter of Paratene Tatae and Sarah "Hera" Halbert. Sarah was the daughter of Thomas Halbert, one of the founding fathers of Gisborne, and Kaikiri (who would later anglicise her name to Keita). Sarah was also the sister of Kate Wyllie (née Halbert) and half-sister of Wi Pere and Ōtene Pītau. Her children also included All Blacks rugby players, William "Bill" Cunningham and Moana Paratene.

He was ordained as a deacon in 1907, and was appointed to Kawakawa, near East Cape. He was ordained as a priest in 1910. He also studied for the examinations of the Board of Theological Studies and in 1911 was awarded the Licentiate in Theology (LTh) in 1911. In addition to his pastoral duties, he worked with his brothers on the family farm, as well as continuing to contribute to newspapers.

He contested one general election; in 1938, he agreed to be the official Labour Party candidate in the Eastern Maori electorate, and he came second after National's Āpirana Ngata.

== Literature ==
Kōhere annually contributed to the Māori magazine Te Ao Hou / The New World during its early years. Since the publication was printed bilingually (Te Reo Māori and English), Kōhere submitted Ngāti Porou poetry with his own translations. One example is "Te Oriori a Hinekitawhiti mo tana Mokopuna mo Ahuahukiterangi/Hine-ki-tawhiti’s Oriori". The translation resulted in the poem possessing an ornate style comparable to Scots poet Burns and English poet Tennyson. Sir Āpirana Ngata, a contemporary of Kōhere, supplied his own translation of the oriori in Ngā Mōteatea: The Songs – Part I. Ngata mentions that his version opted to be, "faithful to the original Maori, thereby sacrificing the ornate to the literal." While both translations ultimately deliver the same material, their stylistic choices result in two different experiences: Ngata's blunt usage of simple language is far more accessible when compared to Kōhere's archaic English; although, Kōhere's version requires a level of engagement from the reader that is absent in Ngata's.

In the Spring issue of the same year, Kōhere's final contribution to the magazine would be published, "He Waiata A Hinetawhirirangi/Hinetawhirirangi's Song". He also received a tribute in the "Haere ki o koutou tipuna" section, where his often uncredited involvement in the Young Māori Party was mentioned. The magazine would make continual references to the late writer in its subsequent issues, even years later, showing his impact on the readers and editors.

Kōhere's final years also saw him publish works incredibly important for the eponymous whanau: The Story of a Maori Chief; and, The Autobiography of a Maori.

Kohere's books, The Story of a Maori Chief Mokena Kohere and his forbears published in 1949, and The Autobiography of a Maori published in 1951, were listed in Books of Mana as two of the 180 most significant works of Māori-authored non-fiction.

== Publications ==
- The story of a Maori chief, Mokena Kohere and his forebears (1949)
- The Autobiography of a Maori. Wellington: Reed Publishing (NZ) Ltd. 1951.
- He Konae Aronui or Maori Proverbs and Sayings (1951).
- Nga kōrero a Reweti Kohere Mā, edited by Wiremu and Ohorere Kaa (1995).
