= Public Audit Act 2001 =

Act of Parliament in New Zealand

New Zealand Parliament
- Royal assent: 6 April 2001
- Commenced: 1 July 2001
- Status: Current legislation

The Public Audit Act 2001 established the Office of the Controller and Auditor-General as an officer of the New Zealand Parliament and reformed and restated the law relating to the audit of public sector organisations.
