= Ernest Adams (baker) =

New Zealand baker and businessman

Ernest Alfred Adams OBE (23 November 1892 – 29 August 1976) was a New Zealand baker, businessman and philanthropist. He co-founded Ernest Adams Limited.

== Biography ==
Born in Wellington, Somerset, England, Adams was educated at Devon County School. In 1909 he went to work for his father Herbert John Adams a master baker. In 1912, after declaring bankruptcy, Adams's family emigrated to Melbourne, Australia. In 1915 he opened his own bakery in Ballarat, Victoria.

In 1921, after the death of his wife Mary Florinda Larson during childbirth, Adams moved to Christchurch where he had met Hugh Bruce, an elderly baker looking to sell his business. Adams and Bruce set up a partnership under the name "Adams Bruce Ltd." By 1929 the company expanded and opened new bakeries in Auckland, Wellington and Dunedin. Following Bruce's retirement, the company started to trade under the name "Ernest Adams Ltd." and soon became the largest bakery in the South Island.

From 1953 to 1956 he was a member of the Christchurch City Council.

== Honours ==
In the 1962 Queen's Birthday Honours, Adams was appointed an Officer of the Order of the British Empire, for services to the community, especially in social welfare work.
