= 1962 Birthday Honours (New Zealand) =

Awards list for New Zealand

The 1962 Queen's Birthday Honours in New Zealand, celebrating the official birthday of Elizabeth II, were appointments made by the Queen on the advice of the New Zealand government to various orders and honours to reward and highlight good works by New Zealanders. They were announced on 2 June 1962.

The recipients of honours are displayed here as they were styled before their new honour.

== Knight Bachelor ==
- Robert James Kerridge – of Auckland. For public services.

== Order of Saint Michael and Saint George ==
=== Companion (CMG) ===
- Lieutenant-Colonel Kenneth Wharton Fraser OBE ED – Dominion president of the New Zealand Returned Services' Association.
- Foss Shanahan – deputy secretary of External Affairs and deputy head of the Prime Minister's Department.
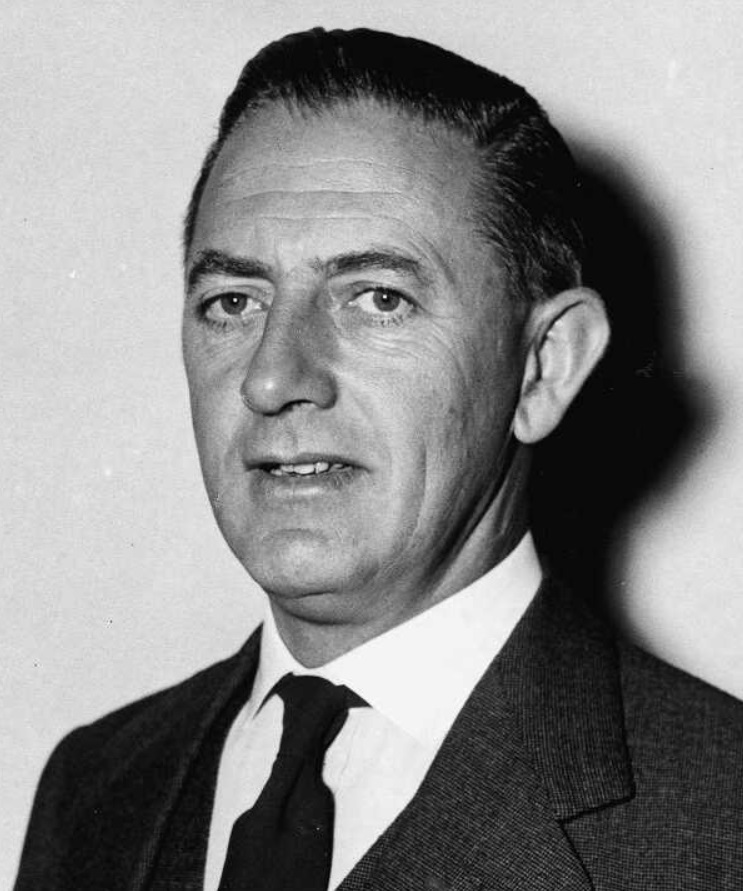
Foss Shanahan

== Order of the British Empire ==
=== Knight Commander (KBE) ===
Civil division

- Alfred Thomas Carroll OBE – of Wairoa. For services to the Māori people.
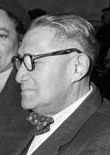
Sir Turi Carroll

=== Commander (CBE) ===
Civil division

- Hermione Ruth Herrick OBE – of Christchurch. For outstanding service to the girl guide movement in New Zealand for over 30 years.
- Stanley Dixon Reeves – of Gisborne. For services to farming.
- Douglas Ogilvie Whyte – of Wellington. For services to industry and commerce.

Military division

- Group Captain Anthony Howard Marsh QHP MB ChB – Royal New Zealand Air Force.

=== Officer (OBE) ===
Civil division

- Ernest Alfred Adams – of Christchurch. For services to the community, especially in social-welfare work.
- Frederick Cameron MB ChB – lately medical superintendent to the Levin Hospital and Training School.
- William Thompson Churchward. For services as Crown solicitor at Blenheim for many years.
- John Alexander Colquhoun – of Palmerston North. For services to education and to local government.
- James Joseph Maher JP – of Trentham. For services to the community.
- Hugh Morison – of Mangatainoka. For services to farming and local government.
- Ronald Macgregor Hutton-Potts – of Invercargill. For services to journalism and broadcasting.
- Hone Heke Rankin JP – of Kaikohe. For services among the Māori people, especially in the North.
- John Richard Reid – of Lower Hutt. For services to sport, especially cricket.
- The Reverend James David Salmond – of Dunedin. For services to the community, especially in connection with youth work and Christian education for the Presbyterian Church of New Zealand.

Military division

- Commander John Foster McKenzie – Royal New Zealand Navy.
- Lieutenant-Colonel Malcolm John Mason MC ED – Royal New Zealand Army Service Corps (Territorial Force).
- Wing Commander Francis Eugene Fennessy – Royal New Zealand Air Force.
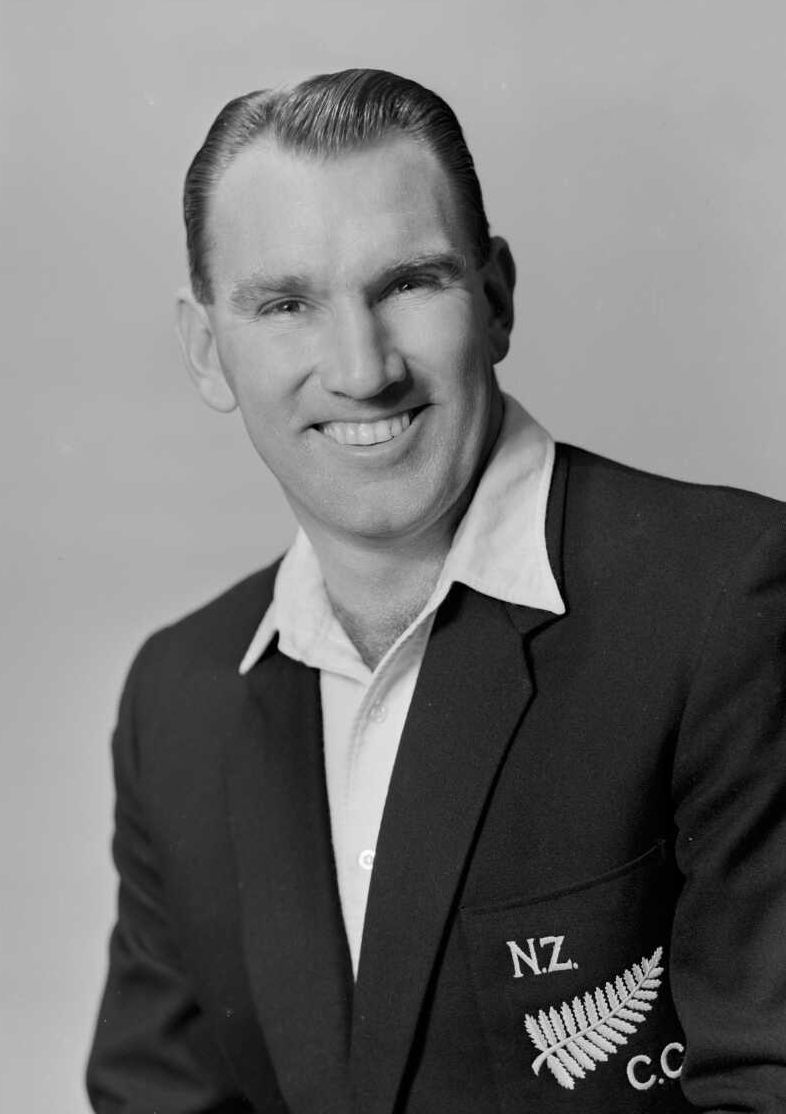
John Reid

=== Member (MBE) ===
Civil division

- Maurice Ballantine Baker – Director of Agriculture, Cook Islands.
- Evelyn Love Dowling – of New Plymouth. For services to music.
- Frank Charles Eyles – of Whangārei. For services to the community in local government and social welfare.
- Michael Christian Gudex – of Hamilton. For services to education and horticulture.
- Charles William Henderson – of Johnsonville. For services to the community, especially to blind children.
- Norah Mary Hudson – of Nelson. For services to the community, especially to crippled children.
- Kassie Bowring McCreanor – of Christchurch. For services to education.
- Thomas McCristell – of Balclutha. For services to the community, especially to farming and education.
- Ethel McQuilkin JP – of Timwald. For social welfare services.
- Winifred Lascelles Jenner Mellsop JP – of Auckland. For services to the community.
- David Norman Perry – of Ōpōtiki. For services to the Māori people.
- Eric Gordon Smith – of Rangiora. For services to farming.
- Peter George Snell – of Auckland. For services in the field of athletics.
- James Edward Francis Stokes JP – of Greymouth. For services to the community, especially in local-government affairs.
- James Leece Sutton JP – of Invercargill. For services to the community, especially as president of the Southland Crippled Children's Association.
- Mete Kingi Takarangi – of Putiki. For services to the Māori people, especially among the Wanganui tribes.
- Albert Wheeler – of Dunedin. For services to Scottish cultural activities.
- Harold Egmont Young JP – of Raumati Beach. For services to the community.

Military division

- Lieutenant-Commander (Sp.) Robert Stewart Fleming – Royal New Zealand Naval Volunteer Reserve.
- Major Bernard Wellesley Jermyn Brown ED – New Zealand Cadet Corps.
- Warrant Officer Second Class Duncan Garner MacPherson – Royal New Zealand Infantry Corps (Territorial Force).
- Major Brian Matauru Poananga – New Zealand Regiment (Regular Force).
- Major Garth Turon Seccombe DCM – Royal New Zealand Armoured Corps (Regular Force).
- Flight Lieutenant Patrick Emmett Hugh Duffin – Royal New Zealand Air Force.
- Warrant Officer Gordon Ernest Tynan – Royal New Zealand Air Force.
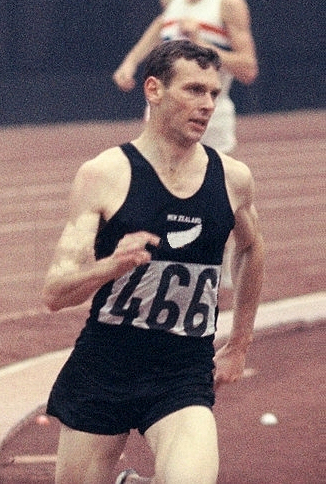
Peter Snell

== Companion of the Imperial Service Order (ISO) ==
- Thomas Pound – formerly assistant under-secretary, Lands Department, and a Government member of the Public Service Boards of Appeal.
- Percy Walton Smallfield – lately director-general of the Department of Agriculture.
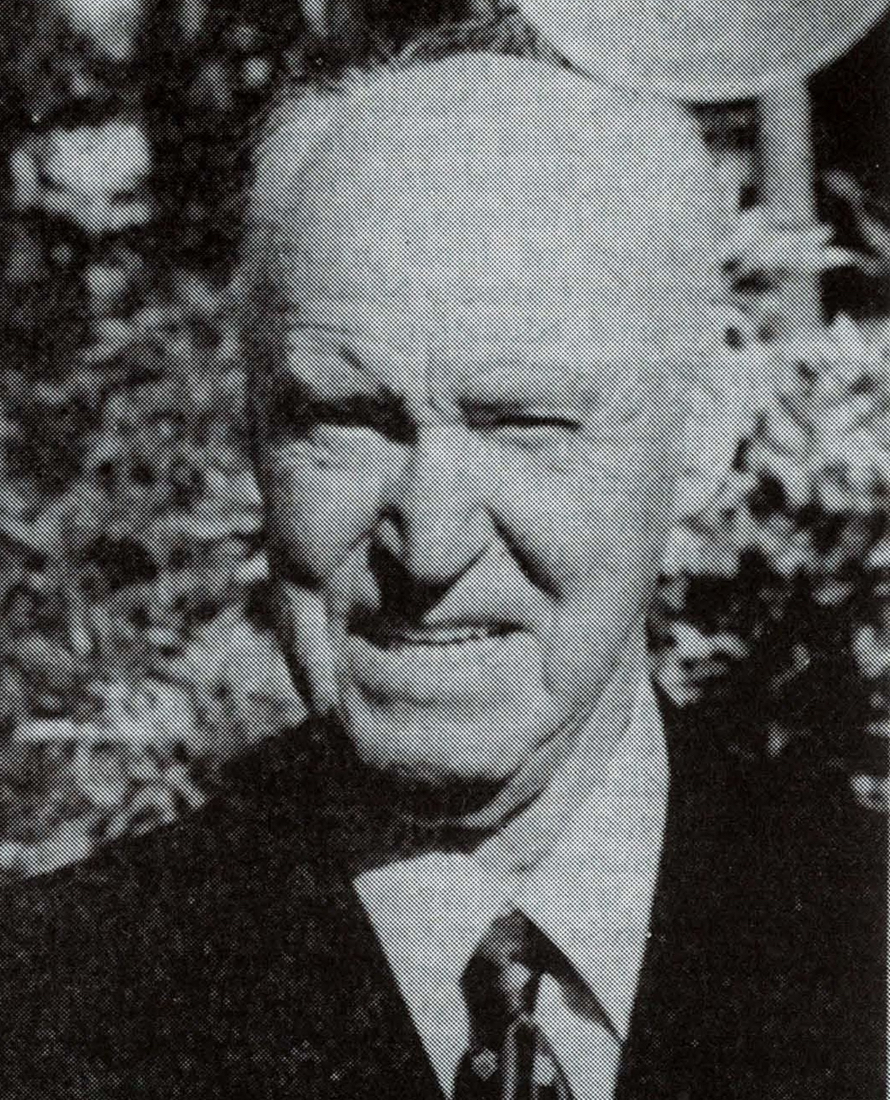
Percy Smallfield

== British Empire Medal (BEM) ==
Civil division

- Elizabeth Florence Bennett – sergeant, New Zealand Police Force, Auckland.
- Jessie Jeanie Dobbie Fleming – constable, New Zealand Police Force, Auckland.
- Alexander Gordon Hogg – constable, New Zealand Police Force, Eastbourne.
- Malcolm McLaren – farm manager, Arohata Institution, Prisons Service.
- James Anthony Newsome. For services when the Hotel Metropole, Akaroa, was destroyed by fire.

Military division

- Chief Petty Officer Patrick Hartley Barker – Royal New Zealand Navy.
- Chief Engine Room Artificer Norman Noel Dewson – Royal New Zealand Navy.
- Chief Engine Room Artificer Daniel Sheldrake – Royal New Zealand Navy.
- Chief Electrician Ralph Roland Wheeler – Royal New Zealand Navy.
- Sergeant (temporary) Rushby Carl Midgley Brown – New Zealand Regiment (Regular Force).
- Staff-Sergeant Joseph Ernest Dunn – Royal Regiment of New Zealand Artillery (Regular Force).
- Staff-Sergeant Ronald James Shelley – Royal New Zealand Army Service Corps (Regular Force).
- Corporal Lewis Tuka Williams – New Zealand Regiment (Regular Force).
- Sergeant Norman Henry Bartholomew – Royal New Zealand Air Force.
- Sergeant William Alexander Kenneth Currie – Royal New Zealand Air Force.

== Air Force Cross (AFC) ==
- Squadron Leader Harold Gordon Moss – Royal New Zealand Air Force.
- Squadron Leader Edward John Ernest Tompkins – Royal New Zealand Air Force.

== Queen's Commendation for Valuable Service in the Air ==
- Lieutenant Barry David Gordon – Royal New Zealand Air Force.
- Flight Lieutenant Te Waaka Hemi Morete – Royal New Zealand Air Force.
