= Ted Harris =

Ted Harris may refer to:

- Ted Harris (company director) (born 1927), Australian company director
- Ted Harris (ice hockey) (born 1936), professional ice hockey player in the National Hockey League
- Ted Harris (songwriter), songwriter in the Nashville Songwriters Hall of Fame
- Ted Harris (mathematician) (1919–2005), American mathematician
- Ted Harris (pastor) (born 1952), Swedish-Barbadian pastor, writer and theologian
- Ted Harris (politician) (1920–1993), member of the Queensland Legislative Assembly

== See also ==
- Edward Harris (disambiguation)
