= Jah Rydem =

2003 album by 1814

Studio album by 1814
- Released: 26 May 2008
- Genre: Roots reggae; Pacific reggae
- Length: 41:14
- Label: Ode Records
- Producer: Billy Kristian

1814 chronology
Jah Rydem (2008)	Covers Album (2011)

Jah Rydem is the debut studio album by New Zealand reggae band 1814. Independently released in 2008, the album received a wider distribution throughout New Zealand in 2010. The album was a commercial success in New Zealand, receiving a double platinum certification. The song "Whakahonohono Mai" was the most played Māori language song on New Zealand radio stations in 2010 and 2011, and in 2023, the song "Jah Rastafari" was the 20th most commercially successful song by a New Zealand artist in the country for the year.

== Production ==
1814 first formed in 1999 at Kaeo in Northland, as a family band led by Patu Colbert with his sons Jimmy and Shaun Colbert. The band performed small venues and at church until 2004, when Patu decided to begin working on a debut album for the band. The group toured New Zealand, and received more work after performing on Māori Television with the group Ardijah. After their song "Get Up" was featured on Conscious Roots 3 in 2006, Patu decided to expand the band to eight members, and record Jah Rydem.

The album was recorded at York Street Studio in Auckland in 2007. Patu and his nephew Darren Katene shared songwriting for the album, and Patu described the music as having an "upbeat funky, R&B, roots reggae feel". "Get Up" from Conscious Roots 3 was added to the album, and the final song on the album, "Whakahonohono Mai", was the band's first song performed in Māori. Many of the songs were written in single days, and the band road tested the tracks during their performances.

== Release and promotion ==
The album was released on 26 May 2008 by Ode Records New Zealand, receiving a wider release in New Zealand in 2010. The song "Whakahonohono Mai" was awarded in 2010 and 2011 as the most played Māori language song on New Zealand airwaves at the Waiata Māori Music Awards. After the Ode Records release, the album debuted at number 38 in New Zealand in March 2010, reaching a peak of 17 in April. The album re-charted on the Official NZ Catalogue Albums in 2023, and by this point it had been certified double platinum. In 2023, the album became the 18th most successful album by a New Zealand artist in the country, and the song "Jah Rastafari" was the 20th most commercially successful song by a New Zealand artist of the year.

== Critical reception ==
Reviewing the album for Radio New Zealand, Mere Takoko praised Jah Rydem for the album's experimental nature, especially the incorporation of techno and Indian elements, the inclusion of a Te Reo Māori song, and the "gorgeous" vocals on the album, while feeling that 1814 had further to grow. Chris Lane of NiceUp likened the album to Katchafire and House of Shem, feeling that the album had a "balance of easy listening pop reggae styles with bass driven conscious tunes". Lane highlighted "Let My People Go" and "Get Up" as his favourite selections from the record.

== Track listing ==
All tracks are written by Patu Colbert and Darren Katene

Jah Rydem track listing
No.	Title	Length
1.	"Morning Star"	3:09
2.	"Jah Rydem"	4:27
3.	"Jah Rastafari"	4:00
4.	"Let My People Go"	4:05
5.	"My Dear Friend"	3:15
6.	"Shackled"	5:43
7.	"Get Up"	4:59
8.	"Insomnia"	4:25
9.	"4 Ununini"	3:44
10.	"Let Jah Fire Burn"	4:21
11.	"Whakahonohono Mai"	3:05
Total length:		41:14

== Credits and personnel ==
- Korey Atama – guitar, vocals
- Des Brown – keyboards
- Jimmy Colbert – bass
- Patu Colbert – guitar, vocals
- Shaun Colbert – drums
- Reuben Heger – saxophone
- Paddi Holmes – cover artwork
- Wiremu (Billy) Karaitiana – production, mixing
- Darren Katene – lead vocals
- Justin Maudsley – engineer
- Katherine Te Haara-Atama – vocals
- Chris Winchcombe – mastering

== Charts ==
Weekly chart performance for Jah Rydem
Chart (2010)	Peak position
New Zealand Albums (RMNZ)	17

== Certifications ==
Certifications for Jah Rydem
Region	Certification	Certified units/sales
New Zealand (RMNZ)	2× Platinum	30,000^{‡}
^{‡} Sales+streaming figures based on certification alone.
