= Eddie Durie =

New Zealand judge (born 1940)

The Honourable Sir Eddie Durie KNZM
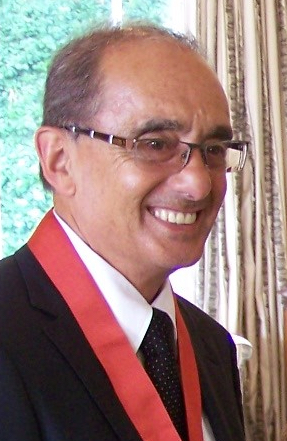
- Durie in 2008

Justice of the High Court
- In office 1998–2004

Personal details
- Born: Edward Taihakurei Durie; 18 January 1940 (age 86)
- Spouse: Donna Hall
- Children: 1

Sir Edward Taihakurei Durie KNZM (born 18 January 1940) is a New Zealand jurist who served on the High Court of New Zealand between 1998 and 2004. He was the first Māori appointed a judge of a New Zealand court.

== Career ==
Durie graduated with a BA and an LLB from Victoria University of Wellington in 1964.

Durie was appointed a judge in 1974 and then was the Chief Judge of the Māori Land Court from 1980–1998, Chairman of the Waitangi Tribunal from 1980–2004, and a Law Commissioner. In 1998 he was appointed to the High Court of New Zealand. He retired from the High Court in 2004, at which point he was the longest-serving member of the New Zealand judiciary.

In 2009, Durie was appointed by Attorney-General Chris Finlayson to chair the Ministerial taskforce on the Foreshore and Seabed Act 2004.

In 2012, Durie was elected to the Maori Council and elected co-chair, a role he held until being appointed the sole chair of the national body in April 2016.

On 27 January 2025, Durie presented in person to the Select Committee considering the draft Treaty Principles Bill. Durie opposed the bill and said that the bill ignored 50 years of examination of cases that inform the principles of the Treaty of Waitangi by "well-qualified Māori and Pākehā of the Waitangi Tribunal". Moreover, if the bill became law, he believed the New Zealand government "would be the laughing stock of the western world, who understand how responsible states today seek to manage relationships with their indigenous people."

== Honours and awards ==
In 1977, Durie was awarded the Queen Elizabeth II Silver Jubilee Medal, and in 1990 he received the New Zealand 1990 Commemoration Medal. In the 2008 New Year Honours, Durie was appointed a Distinguished Companion of the New Zealand Order of Merit, for services to the Maori Land Court, Waitangi Tribunal and High Court of New Zealand. In 2009, following the reinstatement of titular honours by the New Zealand government, he accepted redesignation as a Knight Companion of New Zealand Order of Merit.

Durie holds honorary doctorates from Victoria University of Wellington, Massey University and the University of Waikato.

== Personal life ==
Durie is of Rangitāne, Ngāti Kauwhata and Ngāti Raukawa descent. The community leader John Mason Durie (1889–1971) was his grandfather, and he is the younger brother of Māori academic, Professor Sir Mason Durie. Durie is married to lawyer Donna Hall who operates a law firm, Woodward, from their home in Lower Hutt.

On 13 April 2002, Durie's 8-month-old adopted daughter Kahurautete ('Kahu') was kidnapped at gunpoint in Lower Hutt and held for $3 million ransom. Kahu was found by police eight days later, 360 kilometres (220 mi) away in Taumarunui. The kidnapper was sentenced to eleven years imprisonment and released after serving seven years. The kidnapping was the subject of the 2010 film Stolen: The Baby Kahu Story in which Eddie Durie was played by George Henare.
