= 1814 (band) =

New Zealand reggae band

- Origin: Kaeo, Northland Region, New Zealand
- Genres: Reggae, Roots reggae Roots Rock Reggae
- Members: Patu Colbert (guitar); David Wall (lead vocals); Jimmy Colbert (bass guitar); Shaun Colbert (drums); Jessica McMillan (vocals); Ngawai Campbell (vocals); Erana Jones (keyboards); Thabani Gapara (saxophone); Christian Mausia (Trumpet); Tihema Cooper (Guitar)
- Website: www.audioculture.co.nz/profile/1814/

1814 is a reggae band from New Zealand.

== History ==
The band began in 2004 as a three-piece act formed by Patu Colbert and his sons Shaun and Jimmy. Five other members joined the band over the next five years as the original members felt they needed more musicians to produce the sound they wanted. The band's lead singer is Darren Katene.

The name '1814' was chosen by Patu and his sons the same year, inspired by the year that missionary Samuel Marsden, known for carrying out the first known sermon of Christianity in New Zealand, had arrived at Oihi Bay in the Bay of Islands. The band have played alongside several Kiwi favourites including Ardijah, Katchafire, Cornerstone Roots, Unity Pacific, Che Fu, and Moana and the Tribe and many more

Their first album, Jah Rydem, was released in 2008. It was produced by Wiremu Karaitiana and recorded at York Street Studio in Auckland. with positive reviews. In 2011, The Covers Album was released in New Zealand by producer Hayden Taylor of Yorkstreet Recording Studios and mastered by Chris Winchcombe.

The band's second album, Relax, was released in 2012. A new feel and direction for the summer reggae sounds like "Sunshine", written by saxophonist Chris Pierce and "Unite" cowritten by female vocalist Kalani Marsters sung by Neihana Mackey Harrison. The Relax album was produced and mastered by band founder Patu Colbert and producer Hayden Taylor at Yorkstreet Recording Studios in Auckland.

== Discography ==
=== Albums ===
Date of Release	Title	Label	Charted	Country	Catalog Number
2008	Jah Rydem				
2011	Covers Album				
2012	Relax				
