= Thomas Halbert =

- Born: 8 July 1806; Newcastle upon Tyne, Northumberland, England
- Died: 12 April 1865; Taruheru River, Gisborne, New Zealand
- Other names: Tame Poto
- Occupations: Whaler trader
- Spouse(s): Unknown first wife Pirihira Halbert (née Konekone); Mereana Halbert (née Wero); Riria Halbert (née Mauaranui); Kaikiri "Keita" Halbert; Maora Halbert (née Pani)
- Relatives: Ōtene Pītau (son); Wi Pere (son); Kate Halbert (daughter); William "Bill" Cunningham (grandson); Moana Paratene (grandson) see below for more descendants

Thomas Halbert (8 July 1806 – 12 April 1865) was a New Zealand whaler, trader and founding father. He was born in Newcastle upon Tyne, Northumberland, England and baptised on 25 December 1814 in Gateshead, Durham, England.

== Early life ==
Thomas was the son of William Halbert (1766-1815) and Sarah 1771-1814. William and Sarah Halbert had at least 11 children:

- Sarah Halbert died 1795
- William Halbert born 1792
- Alice Halbert born 1794
- John Halbert 1796-1854
- Sarah Halbert born 1798
- Elizabeth Halbert born 1799
- George Potts Halbert 1802-1851
- Joseph Halbert 1803-1838
- Elizabeth Halbert 1804-1807
- Mary Ann Halbert 1805-1806
- Thomas Halbert 1806-1865

Little is known about Thomas before his emigration to New Zealand. Upon emigrating to New Zealand he would marry six times. His wives included:

== Wives & children ==
- Unknown first wife from Rongomaiwahine in Māhia Peninsula
- Pirihira Konekone from Manutuke.
- Mereana Wero of Te Aitanga-a-Mahaki descent
- Riria Mauaranui of Te Aitanga-a-Mahaki descent. They were married on 21 April 1839 by Bishop William Williams.
- Kaikiri (who would later Anglicize her name to Keita) of Ngati Kaipoho and Rongowhakaata descent from Manutuke,
- Maora Pani of Rongowhakaata and Rakaipaaka descent.

His children were:

=== With his first wife ===
- unknown son who died at infancy.

=== With Pirihira Konekone, his second wife ===
- Otene Pitau

=== With Mereana Wero, his third wife ===
- No Issue

=== With Riria Mauaranui, his fourth wife ===
- Wi Pere (born William Pere Halbert)

=== With Kaikiri, his fifth wife ===
- Kate Gannon (nee Halbert, formerly Wyllie. She married twice and died as Kate Gannon, however she is more famously known as Kate Wyllie)
- Hera (Sarah) Halbert married William Alexander Wyllie. After his death she married James Cunningham. After his death she married Paratene Tatae.
- Mere (Mary) Halbert married Alexander Heany. She divorced him then married Donald Gordon.
- Maata (Martha) Rewanga Halbert married Arthur Francis Cuff.

=== With Maora Pani, his sixth wife ===
- Alice Matewai Halbert married Karepa Mataira.
- Twins who died at infancy
- Thomas Halbert Jr married Ripeka Matahaere Brown.

== Notable descendants ==
Some of descendants include:

- All Blacks rugby player, William "Bill" Cunningham (his grandson through his daughter, Sarah)
- Historian, Rongowhakaata Halbert (his great-grandson through his son, Wi Pere)
- Reremoana Hakiwai (nee Halbert) (his granddaughter through his daughter, Sarah)
- Author, Witi Ihimaera (his great-great-grandson through his son, Wi Pere)
- Museum of New Zealand Te Papa Tongarewa curator, Arapata Hakiwai (his great-great grandson through his daughter, Sarah)
- Politician and former rugby player, Tu Wyllie (his great-great grandson through his daughter, Kate)
- Politician, Meka Whaitiri (his fourth-great granddaughter through his daughter Sarah).

== Death ==
Halbert died 12 April 1865 when he was crossing the Taruheru River and became stuck in the mud. He drowned as the tide came back in and was buried at Makaraka Cemetery. A street in Makaraka is named for him.
