= Controller and Auditor-General of New Zealand =

The Controller and Auditor-General (New Zealand)
- Tumuaki o te Mana Arotake (Māori)

Agency overview
- Jurisdiction: New Zealand, appointed by the Governor-General of New Zealand, on recommendation from the New Zealand House of Representatives
- Headquarters: 100 Molesworth Street, Thorndon, Wellington 6011
- Annual budget: Total budget for 2025/26; Vote Audit ▲$143,442,000
- Minister responsible: Gerry Brownlee, Speaker of the House of Representatives
- Agency executives: Grant Taylor, Controller and Auditor-General; Andrew McConnell, Deputy Controller and Auditor-General
- Website: https://ao.parliament.nz

The Controller and Auditor-General (the Auditor-General) is an Officer of the New Zealand Parliament responsible for auditing public bodies. Grant Taylor began his seven-year term as Controller and Auditor-General on 3 July 2025. The Deputy Controller and Auditor-General is Andrew McConnell. Their mandate and responsibilities are set out in the Public Audit Act 2001. They are appointed by the Governor-General on the recommendation of the House of Representatives.

== Role and functions ==
Public entities are accountable to Parliament and the public for their use of public resources and powers conferred by Parliament. The Auditor-General provides independent assurance that public entities are operating, and accounting for their performance, in keeping with Parliament's intentions. The Auditor-General is independent of executive government and Parliament in discharging the functions of the statutory office, but is answerable to Parliament for stewardship of the public resources entrusted to her.

Under the Public Audit Act 2001, the Auditor-General is the auditor of all public entities, including:

- the Crown
- government departments
- Crown entities (such as the Commerce Commission, the New Zealand Transport Agency, and Te Papa)
- State-owned enterprises (such as New Zealand Post, Kiwibank, and the Meteorological Service of New Zealand)
- local authorities and their subsidiaries (for example, local councils, ports, and airports)
- district health boards
- tertiary education institutions (universities, polytechs, and wānanga)
- schools
- statutory boards
- other public bodies

The Auditor-General employs the public sector organisation Audit New Zealand and contracts with private sector accounting firms to carry out these annual audits.

As well as annual audits, the Auditor-General carries out performance audits and inquiries. Other work of the Auditor-General includes:

- advice to Parliament
- advice and liaison
- working with the accounting and auditing profession
- international liaison and involvement.

== The organisation's structure ==
The Auditor-General employed staff in two business units – the Office of the Auditor-General and Audit New Zealand – and contracts with private sector accounting firms. The two business units shared a Corporate Services Team, these business units were merged on 30 April 2026

=== Office of the Auditor-General ===
The Office of the Auditor-General carries out strategic audit planning, sets policy and standards, appoints auditors and oversees their performance, carries out performance audits, provides reporting and advice to Parliament, and carries out inquiries and other special studies.

=== Audit New Zealand ===
Audit New Zealand carries out annual audits allocated by the Auditor-General. It also provides other assurance services to public entities, within the Auditor-General's mandate and in keeping with the Auditor-General's Auditing Standard on the independence of auditors.

Audit New Zealand's auditors examine the financial statements of public entities and handle special governance, risk, and contract and project management assignments. Audit New Zealand has specialist Tax Audit and Information Systems Assurance Audit teams.

=== Current Structure ===
On 30 April 2026 the two business units were merged into one, with a new branding name and identity, The Audit Office.

== International liaison and involvement ==
The Auditor-General is currently the Secretary General of the Pacific Association of Supreme Audit Institutions (PASAI). PASAI is the official association of Supreme Audit Institutions (government Audit Offices and similar organisations, known as SAIs) in the Pacific. PASAI is one of the regional working groups belonging to the International Organisation of Supreme Audit Institutions (INTOSAI).

The Auditor-General is a member of INTOSAI, and also contributes to the international auditing community by accepting requests to host delegations from overseas audit offices and other government bodies.

== Auditors-General of New Zealand ==
The first auditor-general took office in 1846, and before that audit functions were carried out in the Colonial Secretary's Office. From 1 January 1842 until the appointment of Dr Knight in 1846, accounts were certified by a board consisting of three commissioners of audit. The 21st (and current) auditor-general, Grant Taylor, took office on 3 July 2025.

- 1846–1878 Charles Knight MD, FRCS: 1846–1878 Auditor-General; 1872–1878 Joint Commissioner of Audit
- 1867–1878 James FitzGerald CMG, BA (Cambridge): 1867–1878 Comptroller of the Public Account; 1872–1878 Joint Commissioner of Audit; 1878–1896 Controller and Auditor-General
- 1896–1910 James Kemmis Warburton
- 1910–1922 Robert Joseph Collins
- 1922–1937 George Frederick Colin Campbell CMG
- 1937–1939 James Henry Fowler
- 1939–1945 Cyril George Collins CMG
- 1945–1952 John Porteous Rutherford CBE
- 1952–1960 Christopher Robert John Atkin CBE
- 1960–1965 Archibald Douglas Burns CBE
- 1965–1970 Bernard David Arthur Greig CBE
- 1970–1975 Keith Gillies CBE
- 1975–1983 Alfred Charles Shailes CMG
- 1983–1992 Brian Henry Charles Tyler CBE
- 1992–1994 Jeffrey Thomas Chapman
- 1995–2002 David John Douglas Macdonald QSO
- 2002–2009 Kevin Brady CNZM
- 2009–2017 Lyn Provost CNZM
- 2017–2018 Martin Matthews
- 2018–2025 John Ryan
- 2025–present Grant Taylor

== Deputy Auditors-General of New Zealand ==
In 1878, Charles Batkin was appointed as Assistant Controller and Auditor, a new role created to create continuity in the event of the Auditor-General's absence.

The Deputy Auditor-General can perform all the functions and exercise all the powers of the Auditor-General.

The current Deputy Auditor-General Andrew McConnell took Office on 1 May 2023.

- 1878–1890 Charles Thomas Batkin
- 1890–1907 James Clark Gavin
- 1907–1910 James Barnes Heywood
- 1911–1919 Peter Purvis Webb
- 1919–1922 Henry Alexander Lamb
- 1922–1937 James Henry Fowler
- 1937–1939 Cyril George Collins
- 1939–1945 John Porteous Rutherford
- 1945–1947 Thomas Treahy
- 1947–1951 Charles Jeremiah Marsh Gair
- 1951–1954 Harold Gapes
- 1954–1959 Charles John Lloyd Trott
- 1959–1960 Archibald Douglas Burns
- 1960–1965 Colin Mackenzie Abernethy
- 1965–1969 Ronald Stanley Meech
- 1970 Keith Gillies
- 1970–1979 Gerald John Connelly
- 1979–1985 Jeffrey Thomas Chapman
- 1985–1999 John Wayne Cameron
- 2000–2002 Kevin Bernard Brady
- 2002–2005 Kevin John Simpkins
- 2005–2015 Phillippa Catherine Smith
- 2015–2023 Gregory Mark Schollum
- 2023–Present Andrew McConnell
