= Rugby Pratt =

New Zealand minister, church administrator and historian

Major Albert Rugby Pratt (1875–1946) was a New Zealand Methodist minister, church administrator and historian. He was born in Gisborne, East Coast, New Zealand in 1875.
