= Hoani Meihana Te Rangiotū =

New Zealand tribal leader and peacemaker

Hoani Meihana Te Rangiotū (?–1898) was a notable New Zealand tribal leader and peacemaker. Of Māori descent, he identified with the Rangitāne iwi.
