= 1901 New South Wales rugby union tour of New Zealand =

Summary
P	W	D	L
Total
7	1	0	6
Test match
1	0	0	1
Opponent
P	W	D	L
New Zealand
1	0	0	1

The 1901 New South Wales rugby union tour of New Zealand was a series of matches played in August–September 1901 in New Zealand by New South Wales rugby union.

== Results ==
17 August 1901

Wellington	17 - 16	New South Wales

Athletic Park, Wellington

21 August 1901

Southland	17 - 0	New South Wales

Invercargill

24 August 1901

Otago	5 - 0	New South Wales

Dunedin

28 August 1901

Canterbury	11 - 5	New South Wales

Christchurch

31 August 1901

New Zealand XV	20 - 3	New South Wales
	report

Athletic Park, Wellington

4 September 1901

Wanganui	8 - 9	New South Wales

Wanganui

7 September 1901

Auckland	24 - 9	New South Wales

Auckland
