= Eddie Harris (footballer) =

Australian rules footballer

Personal information
- Full name: Edward Thomas Harris
- Born: 30 June 1879; Warrnambool, Victoria
- Died: 6 October 1966 (aged 87); Box Hill, Victoria
- Original team: Collingwood Juniors
- Height: 171 cm (5 ft 7 in)
- Weight: 69 kg (152 lb)

Playing career^{1}
| Years | Club | Games (Goals) |
| 1900 | Collingwood | 1 (0) |
- ^{1} Playing statistics correct to the end of 1900.

Edward Thomas Harris (30 June 1879 – 6 October 1966) was an Australian rules footballer who played with Collingwood in the Victorian Football League (VFL).
