= Hone Heke Rankin =

Nga Puhi leader, medical worker, farmer (1896–1964)

Hone Heke Rankin OBE (13 January 1896 – 16 April 1964), also known as John Rankin, was a New Zealand tribal leader, medical worker and farmer. Of Māori descent, he identified with the Ngā Puhi iwi. He was born in Gisborne, New Zealand, in 1896 to Matire Ngapua of Ngā Puhi, and her husband, John Claudian (Claudius) Rankin, a Scottish immigrant. Matire Ngapua's brother was Hōne Heke Ngāpua, a Member of Parliament.

In the 1962 Queen's Birthday Honours, Rankin was appointed an Officer of the Order of the British Empire, for services among the Māori people, especially in the North.
