= Robert Kerridge =

New Zealand businessman (1901–1979)

Robert James Kerridge
- Born: 30 October 1901; Christchurch, New Zealand
- Died: 26 April 1979 (aged 78)
- Occupations: Cinema proprietor; film distributor; tourism promotor; businessman

Sir Robert James Kerridge (30 October 1901 – 26 April 1979) was a New Zealand businessman, cinema proprietor, film distributor, tourism promoter and entrepreneur.

== Biography ==
Kerridge was born in Christchurch, New Zealand, on 30 October 1901. He developed a theatre chain that owned or controlled 133 cinemas, the biggest exhibition chain in New Zealand or Australia. In 1946, Kerridge sold 50 per cent of his cinema chain to the J. Arthur Rank Organisation of London, netting the vendors almost £1 million, and a Rolls-Royce car for Kerridge. The chain was renamed Kerridge Odeon.

== Honours and legacy ==
In the 1962 Queen's Birthday Honours, Kerridge was appointed a Knight Bachelor, for public services. He was buried at Purewa Cemetery in the Auckland suburb of Meadowbank. In 1995, Kerridge was posthumously inducted into the New Zealand Business Hall of Fame.
