= Ōtene Pītau =

- Born: 1834; New Zealand
- Died: 13 August 1921
- Occupation: Tribal leader
- Relatives: Thomas Halbert (father); Wi Pere (half brother); Kate Halbert (half sister); William "Bill" Cunningham (nephew); Moana Paratene (nephew)

Ōtene Pītau (born Otene Pitau Halbert, 1834 – 13 August 1921) was a New Zealand Māori leader. Of Māori descent, he identified with the Rongowhakaata iwi. He was born in New Zealand in about 1834.
