= William Hamblett =

20th-century Anglican cleric in New Zealand

William Alexander Harry Hamblett (1879 – 11 August 1960) was the Archdeacon of Central Otago from 1945 to 1949; and Archdeacon of North Otago from 1949 to 1952.

Hamblett was born in Gisborne, New Zealand in 1879 and educated at the University of Durham. He was ordained in 1913 and his first post was as Curate at Taieri. Later he was Vicar of Gore and then of St. Matthew's Church, Dunedin. He was Examining Chaplain to the Bishop of Dunedin from 1934 to 1950 and a Residentiary canon of St. Paul's Cathedral, Dunedin from 1942 to 1945.

He died on 11 August 1960.
