= Richmal Oates-Whitehead =

New Zealand medical editor

Richmal Marie Oates-Whitehead (February 1970 – August 2005) was an employee of the British Medical Association. After the 7 July 2005 London bombings, she claimed to have tended to the attack victims as a doctor, though she did not have any medical qualifications. She was found dead shortly after coming to the attention of the press. Initially, it was suspected that she might have committed suicide, but it emerged later that she died of natural causes.

== Early life ==
Oates-Whitehead was born and brought up in Gisborne, New Zealand. She had epilepsy in her childhood. She displayed interest in becoming a physician or entering the medical profession right from her school days. Her school friends described her as a caring person.

While she did not become a physician, she trained as a radiation therapist for a year in 1991, working on a study on prevention of blood coagulation. This included an internship at Auckland. She moved to London in 2001, and prior to her last employment with British Medical Association (BMA) as an editor of Clinical Evidence (an online journal of the British Medical Journal), she was with the Royal College of Paediatrics and Child Health in the role of clinical effectiveness coordinator. Immediately prior to her employment at the BMA she worked as a medical writer for Euro RSCG Medical Education; throughout her brief employment at this company she posed as a doctor.

== London bombings ==
Oates-Whitehead came to attention in the aftermath of the 7 July 2005 London bombings at Tavistock Square. She claimed to have been asked to help out by some firemen and that she did not hesitate for a moment.

She was widely hailed as a "heroine", after her accounts of treating the seriously injured were carried out by the press, especially in New Zealand. Subsequently, The New Zealand Herald, among others, researched her background and found that she was not a doctor, but an editor of a BMA publication, a job that did not require medical qualifications.

The media's suspicion was triggered by an account by Oates-Whitehead of how she heard a controlled explosion of another bomb by the police while she was busy tending to the victims. Scotland Yard's denial of such an explosion and the absence of her name on either of the UK or the New Zealand Medical Council registers of doctors strengthened the suspicions. Nor could the University of Auckland confirm that she was a graduate of the institution. Oates-Whitehead contested the newspaper's contention and threatened to sue it for defamation, but resigned from her post on health grounds when BMA announced an inquiry into her antecedents. The controlled explosion that Oates-Whitehead heard was later reported by others.

According to the Richmond and Twickenham Times newspaper, there had been a controlled explosion of a suspect package on the bus: 'Sergeant Graham Cross and his unit of five were trying to set up a cordon around the King's Cross bombing when the number 30 bus was blown up in Tavistock Square. "We were only 100 metres away," Mr Cross said. Team member PC Ashley Walker was looking at the bus as it exploded before his eyes. As they ran closer, they saw "people's body parts and lumps of flesh", PC Walker remembers. One man's legs were trapped under a bench, while another mangled victim hanged with his head over the edge of the bombed top deck.

Then they spotted a microwave box near a window. Another bomb? They thought it was. "But we had no choice, really," Mr Graham says. "We had to go get people off the bus."

A bomb disposal unit later blew up the package in a controlled explosion.'

Testimony given at the Coroner's Inquest confirms the controlled explosion of the microwave oven:

Transcript:

Q. In relation to secondary devices, you were aware, I think, during your time at the scene, in relation to secondary devices, of the attendance of a Metropolitan Police explosives unit, explosives officer. Is that right?
A. That's correct.

Q. I think, to use the phrase that you did in your recent statement in which you went over your actions on the day itself, you noted that the box that you considered may have contained a secondary device—which would be the microwave oven, as it transpired to be — was neutralised by the explosives officer. There was a controlled explosion at one stage carried out by explosives officers that day. Was that subsequent—put it another way, was that something that occurred or that didn't occur while you were there?
A. Sorry?

Q. The question is probably poorly phrased. Were you aware of a controlled explosion?
A. Yes.

Q. -- or simply the attendance of explosives officers?
A. I heard the controlled explosion, yes.

Q. Right. I don't suppose you can provide a time for that, can you, or can you?
A. After 30 minutes. That's my guess, I can't know.

Q. All right. That's all I want to ask about that.

== Death ==
Following apprehensions from her family members, the police entered her flat in West London on 17 August and found her dead body. Initially it was believed that she might have committed suicide due to the possible media witch hunt and loss of her job. However, post-mortem reports suggested that she died of a pulmonary embolism. The Coroner's office ruled out an inquest as the death was due to natural causes.

== Alleged personality disorder ==
Newspaper reports indicate that Oates-Whitehead seemed to have a personality disorder. She always carried a stethoscope in her handbag despite not being a doctor; described herself as an epidemiologist or a professor in her correspondence and told others that she travelled to Iraq and Indonesia to provide medical assistance to the war victims and the tsunami victims respectively.

Her claims also included having cancer, being stalked, having a mini heart attack, references to a retired professor as partner and giving birth to premature twins who died within a day. A common thread of appeal for either admiration or sympathy seems to have run through her stories.
