= Gordon Robertson (cricketer) =

New Zealand cricketer (1909–1983)

Personal information
- Full name: Gordon John Robertson
- Born: 15 February 1909; Gisborne, Poverty Bay, New Zealand
- Died: 4 September 1983 (aged 74); Lower Hutt, Wellington, New Zealand
- Batting: Right-handed
- Bowling: Right-arm medium

Domestic team information
- Years: Team
- 1925/26–1935/36: Poverty Bay
- 1937/38–1940/41: Otago
- 1947/48–1949/50: Hutt Valley
- Source: ESPNcricinfo, 22 May 2016

Gordon John Robertson (15 February 1909 – 4 September 1983), sometimes known as Jack Robertson, was a New Zealand cricketer. He played eleven first-class matches for Otago between the 1937–38 and 1940–41 seasons.

Robertson was born at Gisborne in 1909 and educated at Gisborne Boys' High School. He played cricket at school and made his representative debut for Poverty Bay whilst still at school. He went on to play regularly for the side, including in the Hawke Cup between 1925–26 and 1935–36. He played club cricket for a variety of sides and was considered "a cricketer of all-round talent" who was a "most valuable" part of his club sides and of the representative side. Robertson had played rugby union at school as a full-back, and for a time played club rugby for the Old Boys' club in Gisborne as a wing three-quarter before a knee injury caused him to retire from the sport. He also played lawn bowls to a high standard, boxed and took part in middle distance running events for Poverty Bay Amateur Athletic Club.

Professionally Robertson worked for the National Bank of New Zealand in Gisborne before being promoted and moving to Dunedin in Otago in 1936. He played for Dunedin Cricket Club and impressed with his all-round performance, particularly with his bowling which was described as "particularly impressive". He was not selected for the Otago Plunket Shield side in his first season in Dunedin, although he did play for the province against North Otago and was twelfth man for the Shield match against Canterbury in February 1937.

By the start of the following season he had been chosen as deputy-captain of the Dunedin club and made his representative debut for Otago on Christmas Day 1937 against Canterbury at Christchurch. After recording a duck in his first innings, Robertson scored 57 runs in his second innings in the match, one of five half-centuries he scored during his first-class career. he also took three wickets in Canterbury's second innings and played in both of Otago's other Shield matches during the season, scoring another half-century against Wellington.

The following two seasons saw Robertson play in all of Otago's Plunket Shield fixtures. He made a score of 73 against Auckland in 1938–39 and 83 not out against Canterbury in 1939–40, the highest score of his first-class career. Considered a "well-known player" who was considered a "solid bat" and "no mean" bowler, Robertson played some wartime cricket for Otago, including two first-class matches during the 1940–41 season, but by the time the Plunket Shield resumed after World War II he had moved to the Wellington area where he played club cricket for Petone. He played Hawke Cup matches for Hutt Valley between 1947–48 and 1949–50, captaining the side. He later coached the Hutt Valley team.

Robertson died at Lower Hutt in 1983. He was aged 74.
