= Mōkena Kōhere =

New Zealand tribal leader

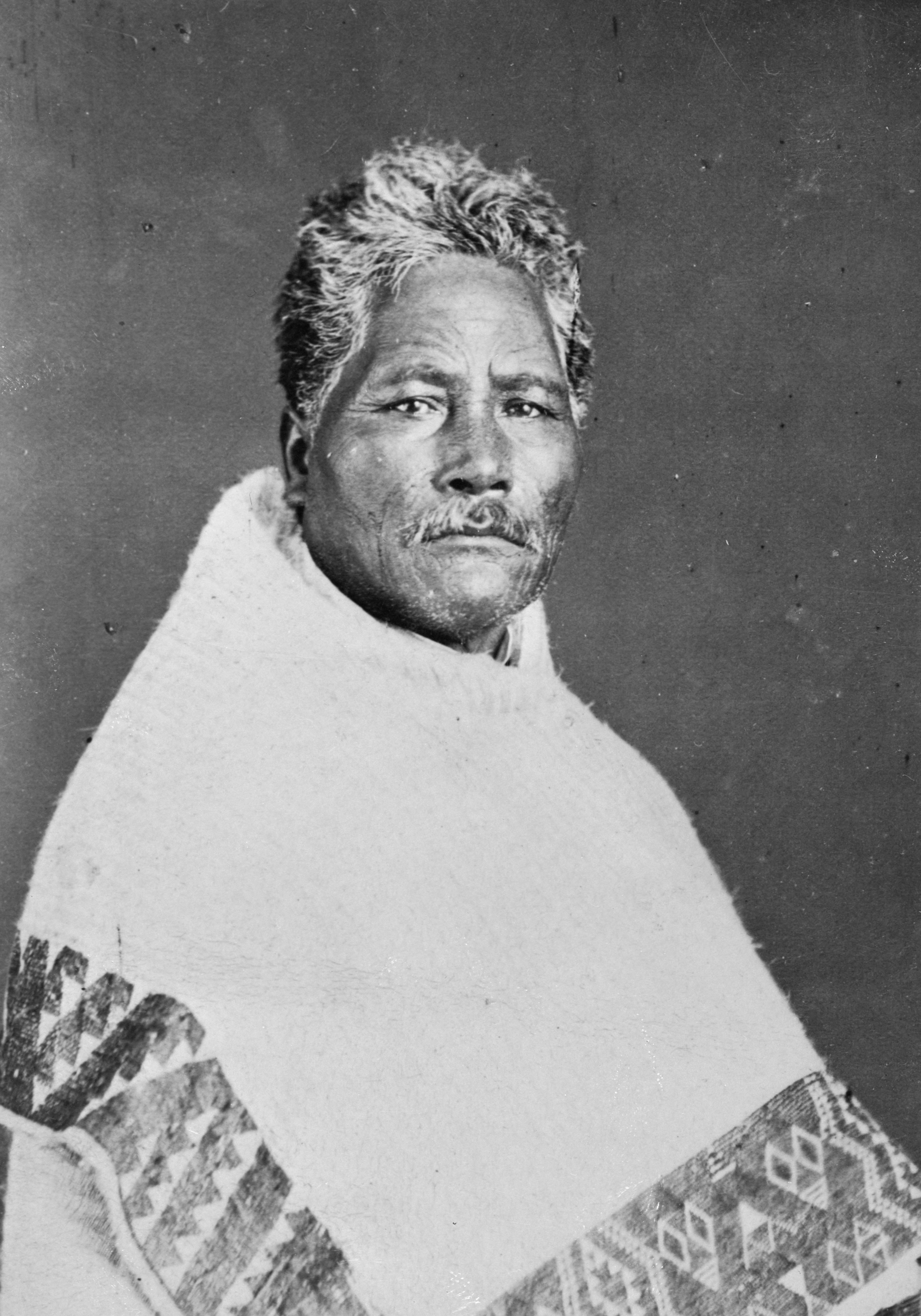
- Born: 1812
- Died: 4 March 1894
- Occupations: Assessor, politician
- Spouse: Marara Hinekukurangi
- Relatives: Rēweti Kōhere (grandson); Hēnare Kōhere (grandson); Reverend Canon Poihipi Kōhere (grandson)

Mōkena Kōhere (1812 – 4 March 1894) was a New Zealand tribal leader, assessor and politician. Of Māori descent, he identified with the Ngāti Porou iwi. He was born in Rangitukia, East Coast, New Zealand. He was a member of the New Zealand Legislative Council from his appointment on 11 October 1872 until his resignation on 25 April 1887. Rēweti Kōhere and Hēnare Kōhere were his grandsons. Mokena Kohere Street in Manakau, Horowhenua, is named for him.
