= Ngāti Kauwhata =

- Iwi (tribe) in Māoridom
- Manawatu District
- Rohe (region): Manawatū
- Waka (canoe): Tainui
- Maunga (mountain): Ruahine
- Awa (river): Ōroua
- Population: 1,734

Ngāti Kauwhata is a Māori iwi (tribe) of the Manawatū area of New Zealand. In the 2018 New Zealand census, 1,734 people listed Ngāti Kauwhata as their iwi.

Ancestors of the iwi came to New Zealand on the Tainui waka. They originally lived around Maungatautari in the Waikato. Large numbers of them migrated to the southern North Island in the 1820s. Mason Durie was a prominent leader in the 20th century.

The iwi has two main marae, Kauwhata Marae (Kai Iwi Pā) and Aorangi Marae. There was formerly another marae, "Te Iwa Tekau mā Iwa".

== Kauwhata Marae (Kai Iwi Pā) ==
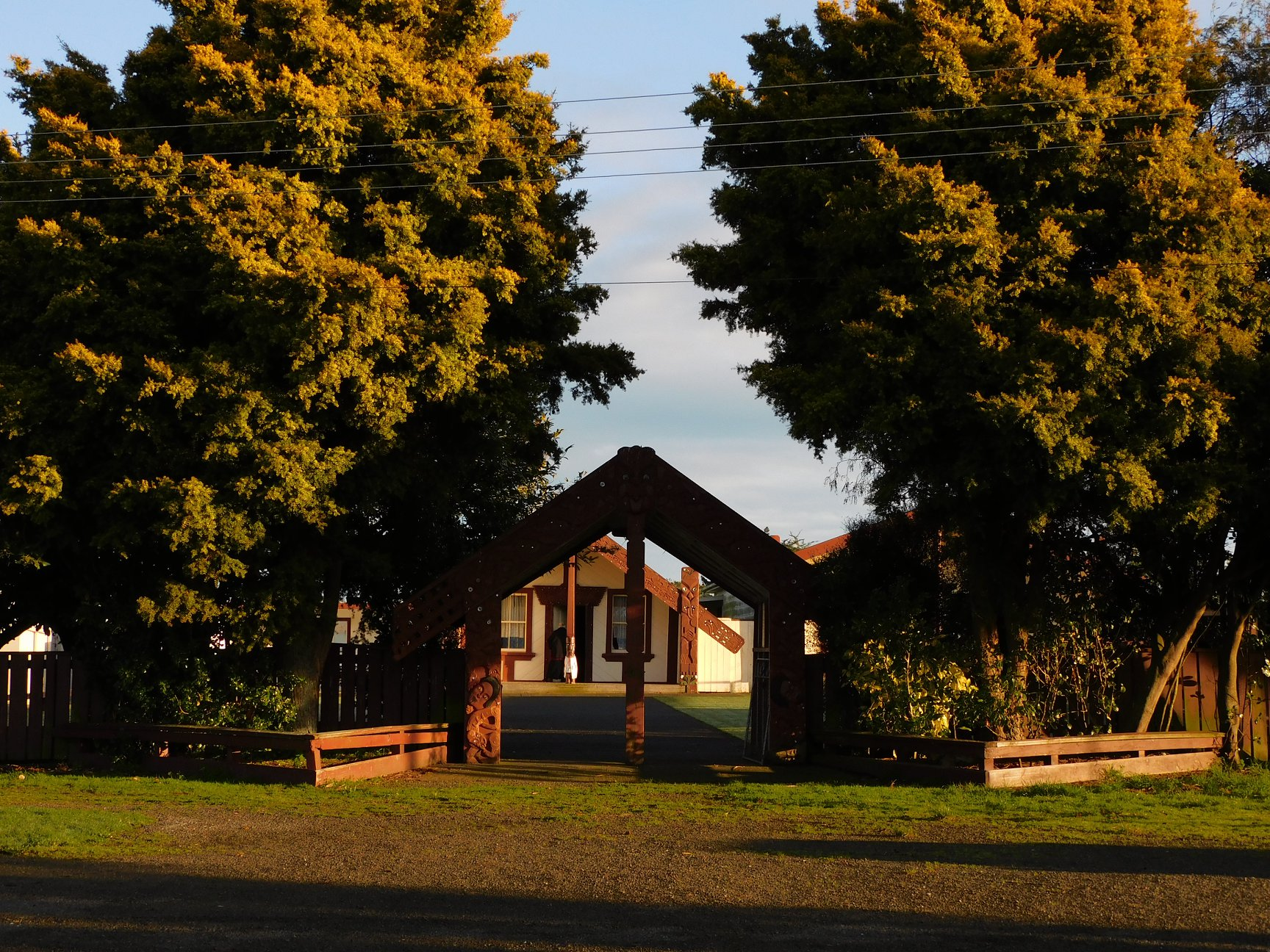
The waharoa (gateway) to Kauwhata Marae (Kai Iwi Paa)

Kauwhata (Kai Iwi Pā) is located just south of Feilding. The main hapū of the marae is Ngāti Hinepare. The whare-tīpuna is also named Kauwhata, the wharepuni named Te Aroha o Ngā Mokopuna and the wharekai named Moarikura.

The pepeha is:

Ko Ruahine te maunga
Ko Ōroua te awa.
Ko Tainui te waka.
Ko Hinepare te hapū
Ko Ngāti Kauwhata te iwi.

== Aorangi Marae ==
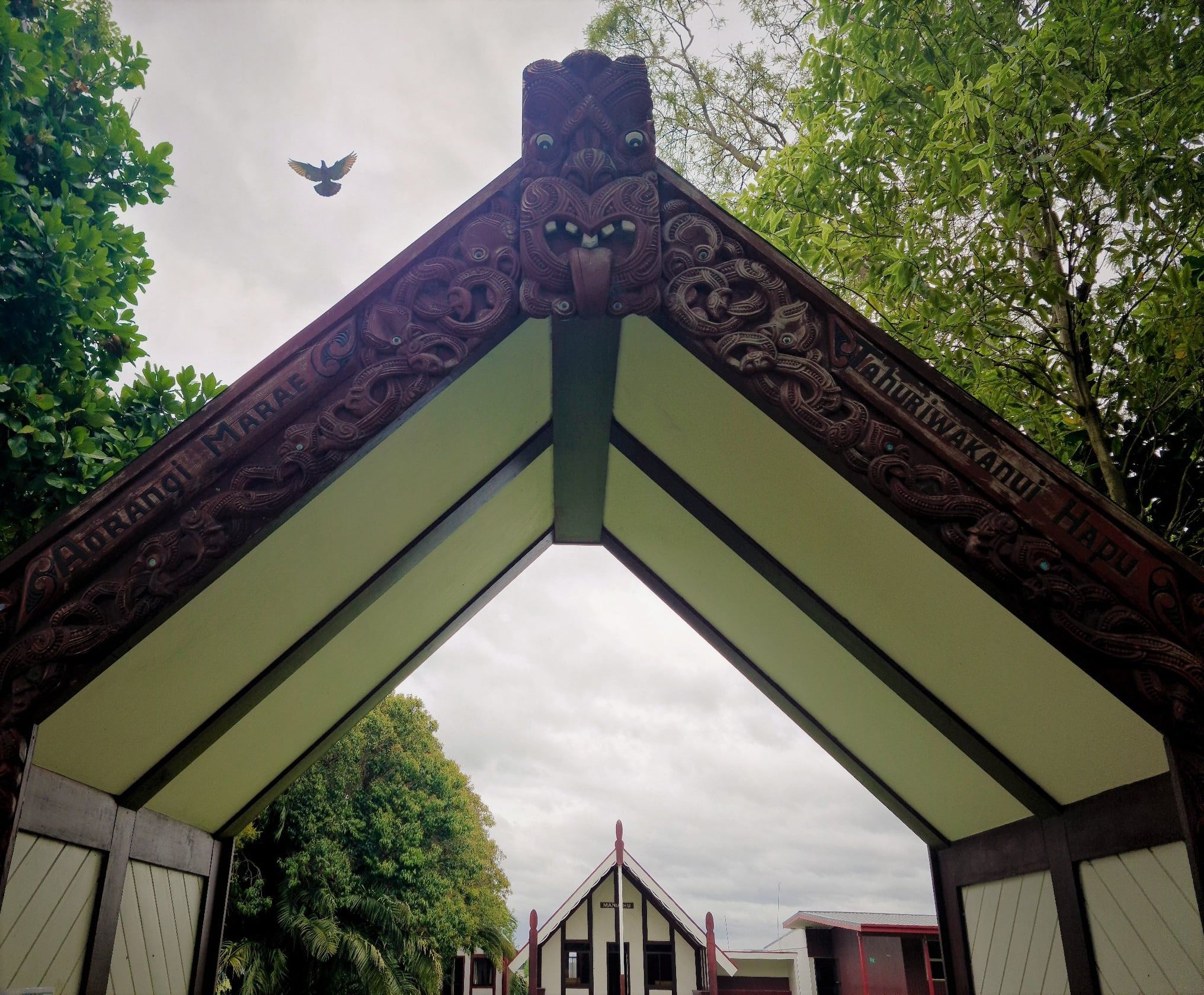
The waharoa (gateway) to Aorangi Marae

Aorangi marae is located just south of Feilding. The main hapū is Ngāti Tahuriwakanui. The wharenui is named Maniaihu.

The pepeha is:

Ko Ruahine te maunga
Ko Rangitīkei te awa
Ko Tainui te waka
Ko Tahuriwakanui te hapū
Ko Ngāti Kauwhata te iwi

== Te Iwa Tekau mā Iwa ==
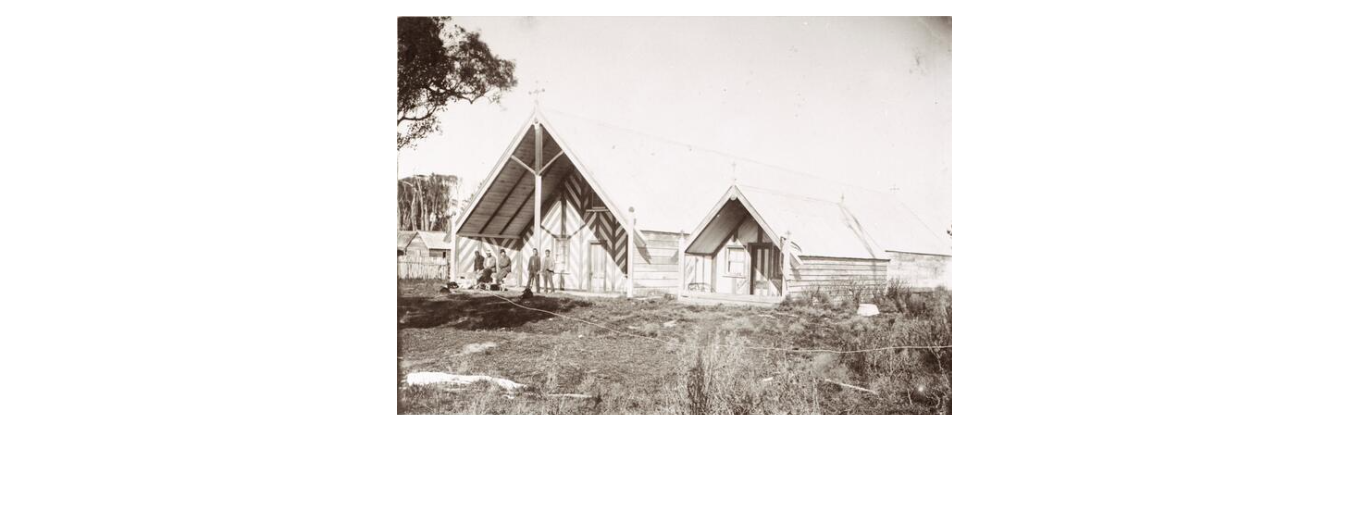
Iwa Tekau maa Iwa Marae

Te Iwa tekau mā Iwa was a marae located in Awahuri on the east bank of the Oroua River, a few chains south of the main highway between Palmerston North and Bulls. The wharenui of the marae was simply known as "Te Iwa".

The wharenui was erected by the Ngāti Kauwhata hapū Ngāti Turoa in the late 1870s or early 1880s and was visited by Kiingi Tāwhiao on 25 January 1883. The wharenui fell into disrepair in the early 20th century, and was destroyed by the 1936 cyclone.

The pepeha is:

Ko Ruahine te maunga
Ko Ōroua te awa.
Ko Tainui te waka.
Ko Turoa te hapū
Ko Ngāti Kauwhata te iwi
