= Edward Francis Harris =

New Zealand public servant, interpreter, landowner, genealogist

Edward Francis Harris (13 May 1834 – 26 July 1898) was a New Zealand public servant, interpreter, landowner, genealogist. Of Māori descent, he identified with the Rongowhakaata and Te Aitanga-a-Hauiti iwi. He was born in Gisborne, East Coast, New Zealand on 13 May 1834.
