= Lyn Provost =

New Zealand public servant

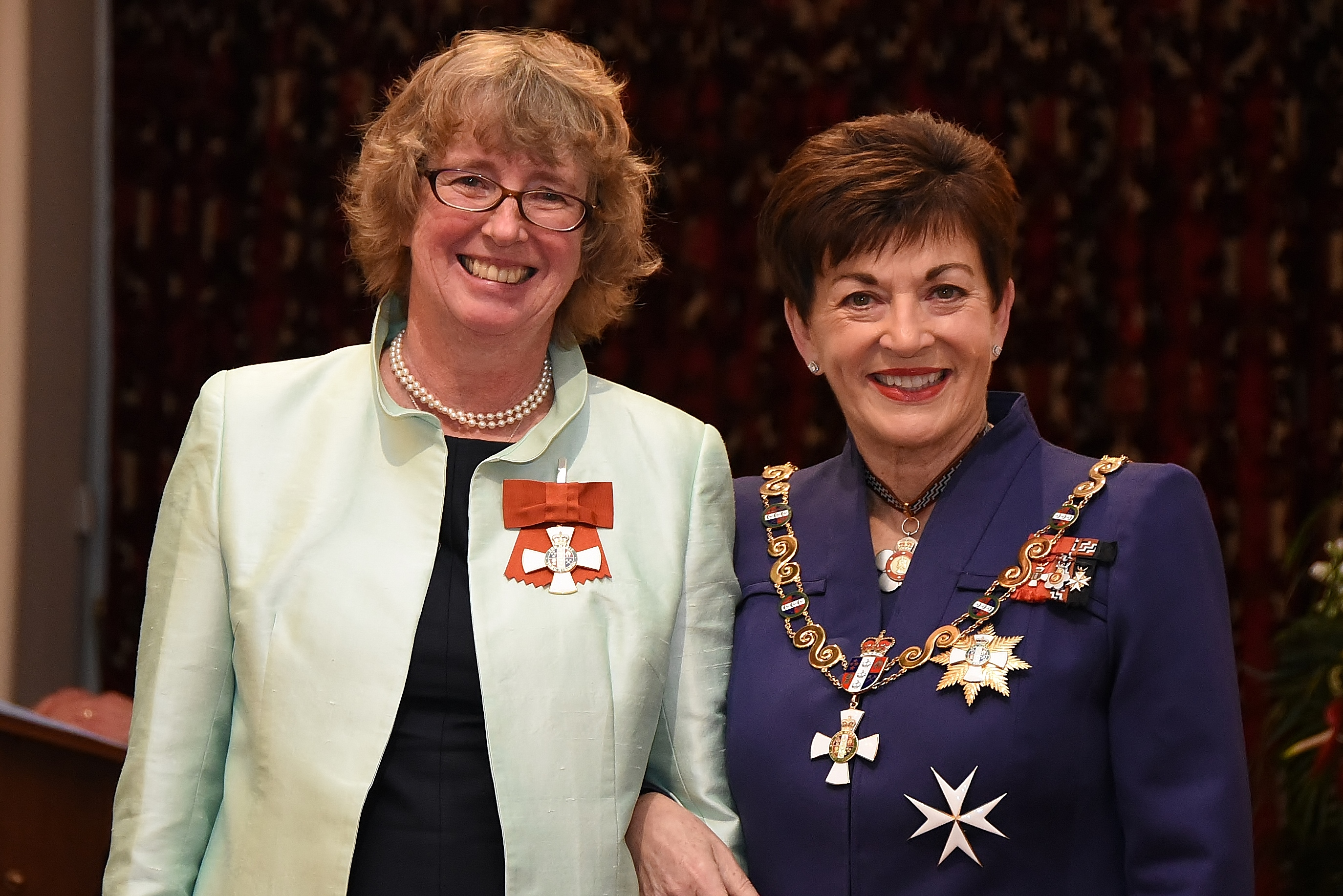
Provost (left), after her investiture as a Companion of the New Zealand Order of Merit by the governor-general, Dame Patsy Reddy, in 2017

Lynette Diana Provost CNZM is a New Zealand chartered accountant, who served as Controller and Auditor-General of New Zealand from 2009 until 2017.

Provost was born and grew up in Gisborne, New Zealand. At age 18, she moved to Wellington to study accountancy at Victoria University of Wellington. After graduating, she started working for the Audit Office (now Audit New Zealand, one of the business units of the Controller and Auditor-General) as an Assistant Auditor, and completed qualification as a Chartered Accountant.

She spent some years living and working in the private sector in the United Kingdom and South Africa. She returned to New Zealand, and took various roles in the public sector. She was the Director of Professional Services and then an Assistant Auditor-General for the Audit Office (now the Office of the Auditor-General, one of the business units of the Controller and Auditor-General), the State Services Commission, and Archives New Zealand, where she gained experience in senior management roles. She was acting Chief Executive at Archives New Zealand.

In 2001, Provost became the first woman civilian to be appointed to the role of Deputy Commissioner of New Zealand Police. She held this position for eight years. As deputy commissioner, she was responsible for six police districts, as well as for leading finance, planning, information technology, and strategy within New Zealand Police.

Provost began her term as Controller and Auditor-General in October 2009. In the role, Provost was responsible for giving independent assurance to Parliament and the public about the performance and accountability of public organisations. She completed her term on 31 January 2017, and was succeeded by Martin Matthews.

In the 2017 Queen's Birthday Honours, Provost was appointed a Companion of the New Zealand Order of Merit for services to the State. In 2020, Provost was conferred an honorary Doctorate of Commerce from Victoria University of Wellington.
