= Hēnare Kōhere =

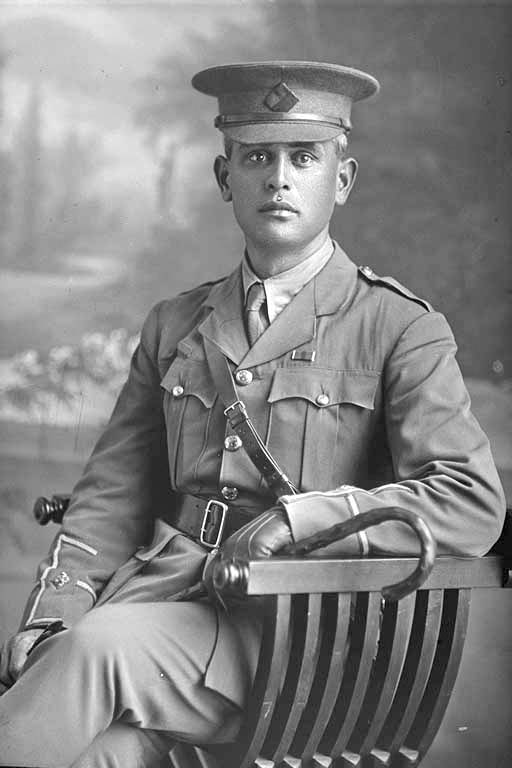
- Born: Hēnare Mōkena Kōhere; 10 March 1880; Te Araroa, New Zealand
- Died: 16 September 1916; France
- Other names: Henry Morgan Kōhere (literal translation)
- Occupations: soldier farmer
- Spouse(s): Ngārangi Tūrei (first wife); Kararaina Goldsmith (second wife)
- Relatives: Rēweti Kōhere (brother); Mōkena Kōhere (grandfather); George Nēpia (son-in-law)

Hēnare Mōkena Kōhere (10 March 1880 – 16 September 1916) was a New Zealand farmer and soldier. Of Māori, English and French descent, he identified with the Ngāti Porou iwi. He was born in Te Araroa, East Coast, New Zealand, on 10 March 1880. His parents were Hōne Hiki Kōhere and Henerata Bristow (sometimes noted as Peretō), and his grandfather was Mōkena Kōhere. His eldest brother was Rēweti Kōhere. Hēnare Kōhere fought as an officer in the First World War and died of wounds in France on 16 September 1916.
