= Reremoana Hakiwai =

Reremoana Hakiwai (3 February 1889 – 8 March 1981) was a New Zealand cook and community leader.

Of Māori descent, she identified with the Ngati Porou and Rongowhakaata iwi.

Hakiwai was born in Manutuke, East Coast, New Zealand, on 3 February 1889. She attended the Hukarere Native School for Girls.
