= Rangitāne =

Māori iwi (tribe) in Aotearoa New Zealand

- Iwi (tribe) in Māoridom
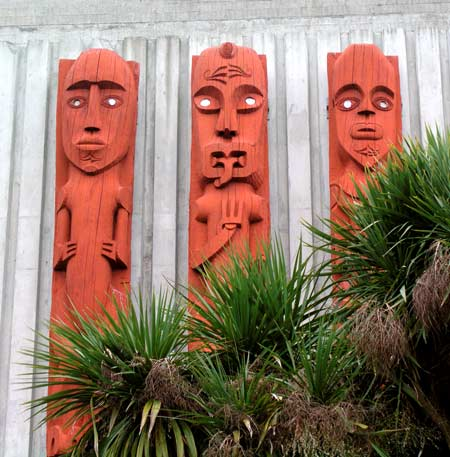
- Guardian ancestors of Rangitāne

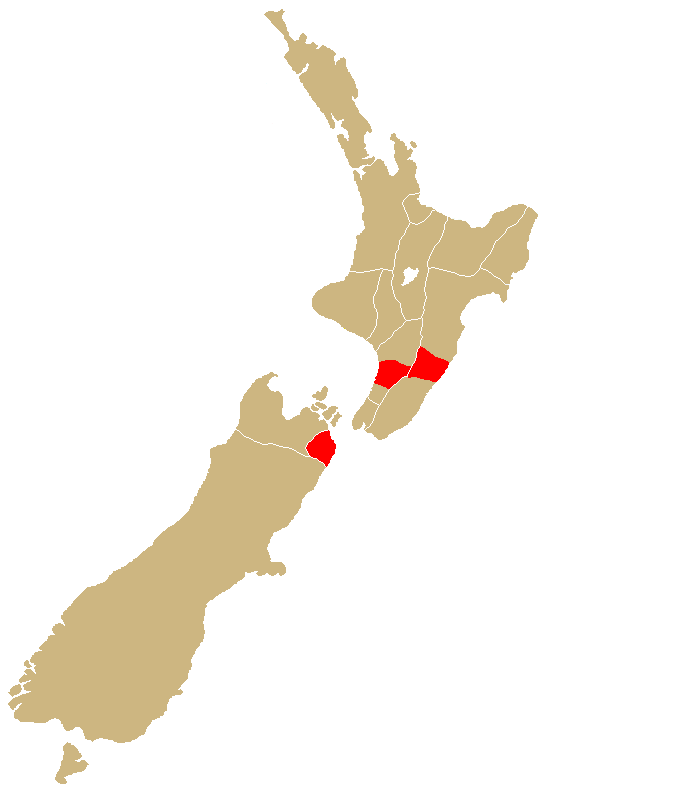
- Rohe (region): Manawatū, Wairarapa, Horowhenua, Tamaki-nui-a-Rua and Wairau
- Waka (canoe): Kurahaupō
- Website: www.rangitaane.iwi.nz

Rangitāne is a Māori iwi (tribe). Their rohe (territory) is in the Manawatū, Horowhenua, Wairarapa and Marlborough areas of New Zealand.

The iwi was formed as one of two divisions (aside from Muaūpoko) of the expedition team led by Whātonga, a chief from the Māhia Peninsula and father of Tara-Ika a Nohu of Te Whanganui-a-Tara fame.

== Rangitāne in Manawatū ==
The rohe of Rangitāne o Manawatū is from the mouth of the Rangitikei River, stretching up the river to Orangipango, then eastwards to Te Hekenga in the Ruahine Ranges, then southwards along the summit of the ranges to continue along the summit of the Tararua Range, to the peak of Taramea, then westward to the mouth of the Manawatū River, northwards along the coast back to the mouth of the Rangitikei River.

The rohe includes the city of Palmerston North.

Six hapū – Ngāti Hineaute, Ngāti Kapuārangi, Ngāti Rangiaranaki, Ngāti Rangitepaia, Ngāti Tauira and Ngāti Mairehau – live in this rohe.

Tānenuiarangi Manawatū Incorporated is the mandated iwi authority for Rangitāne o Manawatū hapū.

== Rangitāne o Wairau ==
Rangitāne o Wairau has a rohe over Marlborough, including much of Kahurangi National Park, Nelson Lakes National Park, Mount Richmond Forest Park and the Marlborough Sounds. Its marae (Tua Mātene) and wharenui (Te Huataki) are in Grovetown, just north of Blenheim. However, its rohe also includes the city of Nelson, and the towns of Tākaka, Motueka, Saint Arnaud and Picton.

Te Runanga a Rangitāne o Wairau Trust represents the iwi under the Māori Fisheries Act and Māori Commercial Aquaculture Claims Settlement Act 2004. It is run by an executive committee of ten trustees and a chairperson. Iwi Aquaculture Organisation in the Māori Commercial Aquaculture Claims Settlement Act 2004. Rangitāne o Wairau Settlement Trust governs the iwi's Treaty of Waitangi settlement under the Ngāti Apa ki te Rā Tō, Ngāti Kuia, and Rangitāne o Wairau Claims Settlement Act, and represents the iwi in resource consent consultation under the Resource Management Act 1991. Both trusts share managers and offices in Blenheim.

Rangitāne o Wairau's chief executive/general manager is Corey Hebberd.

The iwi has interests in the territory of Tasman District Council, Nelson City Council and Marlborough District Council. It also has a working relationship with Kaikoura District Council and Buller District Council on issues relating to waterways, catchment areas and coastal areas.

== Rangitāne o Tāmaki-nui-a-rua ==
Rangitāne rohe on the eastern side of the Ruahine/Tararua Ranges stretches from Rakautatahi through to Eketāhuna. This rohe is centred on the town of Dannevirke, where there are three Rangitāne Marae, Mākirikiri, Kaitoki, and Whiti-te-rā.

== Demographics ==
=== Rangitāne (Hawke's Bay/Wairarapa) ===
- 1991 census: 156
- 2001 census: 1,197
- 2006 census: 1,566
- 2013 census: 2,217

Major regional locations

- Wellington: 822
- Manawatū–Wanganui: 543
- Hawke's Bay: 288

=== Rangitāne (Manawatū) ===
- 1991 census: 330
- 2001 census: 822
- 2006 census: 1,281
- 2013 census: 1,488

Major regional locations

- Manawatū–Wanganui: 744
- Wellington: 201

=== Rangitāne (unspecified) ===
- 1991 census: 3,003
- 2001 census: 1,689
- 2006 census: 1,569
- 2013 census: 94

== Media ==
Kia Ora FM is the official radio station of the Rangitāne people. It began as Radio Rangitane, or Te Reo Irirangi O Rangitane, on 1 May 1992, and adopted its current name in the 2000s. It broadcasts from Palmerston North and is available on 89.8 FM in Manawatū.

== Notable Rangitāne ==
- Eddie Durie
- Mason Durie (community leader)
- Mason Durie (psychiatrist)
- Jamie Joseph
- Ruru Karaitiana
- India Logan-Riley - climate activist
- Mavis Mullins
- Piri Sciascia
- Keala Settle
- Kayla Whitelock

== See also ==
- List of Māori iwi
