= Kate Wyllie =

Kate Wyllie (early 1840s – 4 February 1913) was a New Zealand tribal leader. She was born Kate Halbert. Of Māori descent, she identified with the Rongowhakaata iwi. She was born in Tutoko, East Coast, New Zealand. She died in Remuera, Auckland, New Zealand. She married James Ralston Wyllie on 14 August 1854. In the early 1870s Kate and James Wyllie built a house across the Taruheru River from the Gisborne township, now known as Wyllie Cottage. After James Wyllie died she later remarried Michael Joseph Gannon (9 June 1881; known as Michael Gannon), a licensed interpreter. Gannon stood unsuccessfully for Parliament in 1881 through to 1890.
