= Books of Mana =

New Zealand non-fiction book

Books of Mana: 180 Māori-Authored Books of Significance
- Editor: Jacinta Ruru, Angela Wanhalla, and Jeanette Wikaira
- Genre: Non-fiction
- Publisher: Otago University Press
- Publication date: 2025
- Publication place: New Zealand
- ISBN: 978 1 990048 85 2

Books of Mana: 180 Māori-Authored Books of Significance is a New Zealand non-fiction book edited by Jacinta Ruru, Angela Wanhalla, and Jeanette Wikaira that celebrates over two centuries of printed Māori books. The genesis of the book was a 2017 meeting between the Royal Society of New Zealand and Ngā Pae o te Māramatanga as part of the former's 150th anniversary, intending to build deeper relationships with Māori researchers and Māori communities. The resulting project, Te Takarangi, selected first 150 landmark non-fiction works, with a further 30 books released over the last five year at the project's fifth anniversary. The book features essays framing these texts as treasured cultural items.

== Background ==
Books of Mana: 180 Māori-Authored Books of Significance developed from a project initiated by the Royal Society of New Zealand and Ngā Pae o te Māramatanga (NPM), the latter being New Zealand's Māori Centre of Research Excellence (CoRE). NPM is hosted at the University of Auckland and has Waipapa Marae—the university's marae—as one of its facilities. The Royal Society was founded in 1867 and as part of its 150th anniversary, it wanted to strengthen its relationship with Māori researchers and Māori communities. NPM hosted the Royal Society's council and its directors on 13 February 2017 at Waipapa Marae to strengthen the relationship between the organisations.

Out of this meeting came the project called Te Takarangi. Three Māori academics—Jacinta Ruru (Ngāti Raukawa, Ngāti Ranginui), Jeanette Wikaira (Ngāti Pūkenga, Ngāti Tamaterā, Ngāpuhi) and Angela Wanhalla (Ngāi Tahu)—compiled a list of 150 Māori non-fiction books. They had often been told by many of their Pākehā colleagues that Māori haven't authored much non-fiction:

Māori are writers, thinkers and intellectuals. We always have been. Our ancestors, the first people to make these isolated islands in the South Pacific their home, created sense, meaning, stories, rules and histories from the mountains, rivers, forests and coastlines. For generations they recorded their knowledge through karanga [ceremonial calls], whaikōrero [formal speeches], mōteatea [traditional chants], karakia [prayers], pūrākau [ancient legends], waiata [songs], and whakataukī [proverbs].

The list mainly comprised monographs, but also included periodicals, language textbooks, dictionaries, and edited collections. The title of one book a day was released, starting on 13 February 2018 (the one-year anniversary of the meeting described above), with the event timed to end during Te Wiki o te Reo Māori (Māori Language Week) 2018. The 150th book title was published on 14 September 2018.

The event was run via social media (Facebook and Twitter) by both NPM and the Royal Society. Before the researchers started releasing the list, it had been peer reviewed.

Te Takarangi display in the University of Otago central library

After the list had been released, Te Takarangi went on tour. The first stop was at the New Zealand Parliament, where it was opened on 16 October 2018 by Nanaia Mahuta as the Minister for Māori Development. Next, the exhibition formed part of NPM's Biennial International Indigenous Conference that was held in mid-November 2018. The exhibition then went to the University of Otago under the name Te Takarangi ki Ōtākou, where it was displayed from 16 October to 8 November 2019.

The original list of 150 books covered titles published until 2017. At the fifth project anniversary in 2023, 30 books were added to the list published in the five years between 2018 and 2022. This brought the list to 180 books.

== Book description and reviews ==
The list comprising 180 books was compiled in book form and published as the Books of Mana on 3 February 2025. The three original Māori academics, Ruru, Wanhalla, and Wikaira, edited the 256-page volume. In total, the book lists 17 contributors, which includes the three main editors. On 12 February 2025, the authors held a celebration of the book release at the Hocken Library in Dunedin. The intention of Te Takarangi was "to celebrate the contribution of Māori to knowledge advancement and bring greater visibility to their work". Their goal was that New Zealanders have the opportunity to know about these important books. The editors have provided a collection of some 20 essays that comment on the relevance of the chosen works and provide summaries for the books listed.

Some of the essays have been published in the news media. For example, Matariki Williams published her essay "Feeling history: taonga and kōrero in places of loss" in the magazine E-Tangata. In one of her essays, "Books are taonga", Jeanette Wikaira explores in The Spinoff her relationships to books and the journey that she personally went through.

Books of Mana is structured around six themes:

- writing in Māori
- kia maumahara (remembering)
- mana wāhine (powerful women)
- kia tū pakiri, kia whakaora (resistance, revitalisation)
- te ao hurihuri (new diversity, frontiers)
- ngā toka tūmoana (anchors)

Poet and writer David Eggleton, in his review of the book, points to a list of ten "anti-racist" books that address problems stemming from colonisation and ignorance about indigenous peoples. He is pleased about the inclusion of mana wāhine who were absent from traditional writing not because they didn't write, but because they were marginalised and ignored by the settler society. He views that the book brings Māori scholarship "to the widest possible audience".

Books of Mana made it onto the longlist of the 2026 Ockham New Zealand Book Awards in the Illustrated non-fiction award category, but it did not win.
