= Jodyanne Kirkwood =

New Zealand business academic

Academic background
- Education: University of Otago
- Thesis: One size doesn’t fit all: gender differences in motivations for becoming an entrepreneur (2004)
- Doctoral advisor: Colin Campbell-Hunt, Malcolm Cone, Sheelagh Matear

Academic work
- Institutions: University of Otago, Otago Polytechnic

Jodyanne Jane Kirkwood is a New Zealand academic, and is a full professor at the Otago Polytechnic, and a senior lecturer at the University of Otago. She specialises in teaching and research on entrepreneurship. Kirkwood's interests include tall poppy syndrome, mumpreneurs and social entrepreneurs.

== Academic career ==
Kirkwood completed a PhD titled One size doesn’t fit all: gender differences in motivations for becoming an entrepreneur at the University of Otago in 2004. Kirkwood then joined the faculty of the Otago Polytechnic, rising to full professor. She is also a senior lecturer at the University of Otago, where she teaches in the Master of Entrepreneurship course.

Kirkwood's interests include tall poppy syndrome, which is a tendency to mock, belittle or denigrate successful people, and her inaugural professorial lecture focussed on whether tall poppy syndrome was holding New Zealand entrepreneurs back. Her research showed that the negative comments which had the most impact on entrepreneurs were face-to-face comments from peers, rather than social media comments. Kirkwood has also researched mumpreneurs and social entrepreneurs, and the role of family members in encouraging entrepreneurship.

In 2014 Kirkwood was awarded a Top 12 Supervisor award by the Otago University Students Association, and has supervised more than 100 master's students and five doctoral students.

Kirkwood is one of three Deputy Editors of the journal Small Enterprise Research.

== Selected works ==
- Jodyanne Kirkwood (2009). "Motivational factors in a push‐pull theory of entrepreneurship". Gender in Management. 24 (5): 346–364. doi:10.1108/17542410910968805. Wikidata Q128442819.
- Jodyanne Kirkwood; Walton, Sara (2010). "What motivates ecopreneurs to start businesses?". International Journal of Entrepreneurial Behaviour and Research. 16 (3): 204–228. doi:10.1108/13552551011042799. Wikidata Q126726629.
- Jodyanne Kirkwood; Tootell, Beth (2008). "Is entrepreneurship the answer to achieving work–family balance?". Journal of Management and Organization. 14 (3): 285–302. doi:10.5172/jmo.837.14.3.285. Wikidata Q128442832.
- Jodyanne Kirkwood (2009). "Is a lack of self‐confidence hindering women entrepreneurs?". International Journal of Gender and Entrepreneurship. 1 (2): 118–133. doi:10.1108/17566260910969670. Wikidata Q128442827.
- Jodyanne Kirkwood (2007). "Igniting the entrepreneurial spirit: is the role parents play gendered?". International Journal of Entrepreneurial Behaviour and Research. 13 (1): 39–59. doi:10.1108/13552550710725174. Wikidata Q128442848.
- Cle-Anne Gabriel; Jodyanne Kirkwood (2016). "Business models for model businesses: Lessons from renewable energy entrepreneurs in developing countries". Energy Policy. 95: 336–349. doi:10.1016/j.enpol.2016.05.006. Wikidata Q128442762.
- Jodyanne Kirkwood (2007). "Tall Poppy Syndrome: Implications for entrepreneurship in New Zealand". Journal of Management and Organization. 13 (4): 366–382. doi:10.5172/jmo.2007.13.4.366. Wikidata Q128442836., v
