= Kate Kearins =

New Zealand business academic

- Education: University of Waikato
- Scientific career
- Workplaces: Auckland University of Technology
- Thesis: Local government power relations : a genealogical study (1997)

Kate Kearins is a New Zealand business academic. She is a Professor at Auckland University of Technology.

== Academic career ==
Kearins has multiple degrees from the University of Waikato, including a 1997 PhD titled 'Local government power relations : a genealogical study' and an MA in French from Massey University. She co-authored 'Thesis Survivor Stories: Practical Advice on Getting Through Your PhD or Masters Thesis' with Marilyn Waring.

Since 2003 she has been working at Auckland University of Technology rising to full professor.

Kearins' research focuses on sustainability.

Kearins is involved in Catholic tertiary education at a national level.

== Selected works ==
- Milne, Markus J., Kate Kearins, and Sara Walton. "Creating adventures in wonderland: The journey metaphor and environmental sustainability." Organization 13, no. 6 (2006): 801–839.
- Livesey, Sharon M., and Kate Kearins. "Transparent and caring corporations? A study of sustainability reports by The Body Shop and Royal Dutch/Shell." Organization & Environment 15, no. 3 (2002): 233–258.
- Kearins, Kate, and Delyse Springett. "Educating for sustainability: Developing critical skills." Journal of management education 27, no. 2 (2003): 188–204.
- Byrch, Christine, Kate Kearins, Markus Milne, and Richard Morgan. "Sustainable “what”? A cognitive approach to understanding sustainable development." Qualitative Research in Accounting & Management 4, no. 1 (2007): 26-52.
- Bendell, Jem, and Kate Kearins. "The political bottom line: the emerging dimension to corporate responsibility for sustainable development." Business Strategy and the Environment 14, no. 6 (2005): 372–383.
- Kearins, Kate (1990). The question of objectivity in Zola's Thérèse Raquin (Master of Arts thesis). Massey Research Online, Massey University. hdl:10179/14210.
