= Audrey Eagle =

New Zealand writer botanical illustrator (1925–2022)

Audrey Eagle CNZM
- Born: Audrey Lily Brodey; 30 October 1925; Timaru, New Zealand
- Died: 27 November 2022 (aged 97); Mosgiel, New Zealand
- Education: Banbury School of Art
- Known for: Botanical illustration
- Spouse: Harold William Eagle (m. 1948; died 1988)
- Awards: Loder Cup (1985); Life member of Forest & Bird (1985); New Zealand Book Awards (1976, 1983, 2007); Allan Mere award (2010)

Audrey Lily Eagle CNZM (née Brodey; 30 October 1925 – 27 November 2022) was a New Zealand botanical illustrator, whose work mainly focused on New Zealand's distinctive trees and shrubs. As the author and illustrator of the two volume Eagle's Complete Trees and Shrubs of New Zealand, Eagle made a notable contribution to New Zealand botany.

== Early life and education ==
Eagle was born Audrey Lily Brodey on 30 October 1925 in Timaru, New Zealand, to English parents. After primary school in New Zealand, her family moved to England in 1933, and she attended the following secondary schools from 1936 to 1943: Horsham High School for Girls, Fulham County Secondary School for Girls, and Banbury County School. She then went on to study engineering drafting at the Government Training Centre at Slough in 1944, and gained an Ordinary National Certificate in electrical engineering in 1947 after studying at the School of Technology, Oxford, and the Dartford County Technical College. In 1948, she married Harold William Eagle. She studied at the Banbury School of Art prior to her return to New Zealand with her husband in 1949.

From 1949 to 1954, Audrey Eagle worked at the State Hydro Electricity Department in Hamilton in the drafting office. During this time, she began her work in botanical illustration and writing. She was a member of numerous societies including Forest & Bird, the Ornithological Society of New Zealand, the Wellington Botanical Society, the New Zealand Botanical Society, the Auckland Botanical Society, and the Botanical Society of Otago. She participated in numerous botanical society field trips and collated a personal collection of botanical specimens.

Eagle was mentored by engineer and botanist Athol Caldwell, going on many field trips with Caldwell and Michael Gudex, and corresponded regularly with New Zealand botanist Tony Druce.

== Work ==
Eagle began in 1954 to paint plants in order to assist with learning their botanical names. By 1968 she started planning a book with examples of every genus of tree and shrub in New Zealand. In 1975, after more than twenty years of work, Eagle's Trees and Shrubs of New Zealand in Colour was published. The book contained illustrations of 228 species, reproduced in life-size, with meticulous notes on identification, distribution and the source of the illustrated material. In 1982, she published a second book, illustrating a further 405 species and varieties. Both books were revised in 1986 to bring the nomenclature up to date. However, as a result of botanical research, a further revision was necessary. In 2006 Te Papa Press published the two-volume edition incorporating all of Eagle's previous illustrations, together with a further 173 new paintings, under the title Eagle's Complete Trees and Shrubs of New Zealand.

Many of her original artworks are held at the Alexander Turnbull Library. The voucher specimens and Eagle's personal botanical collection are contained in the Otago Regional Herbarium (OTA).

== Later life and death ==
After living in Ngāruawāhia for many years, where Harold Eagle was the town clerk, the Eagles moved to New Plymouth in about 1982. Harold died there in 1988, and in 1996 Eagle moved to Dunedin, residing at Macandrew Bay. Eagle died in Mosgiel on 27 November 2022, at the age of 97.

== Publications ==
- Eagle's Trees and Shrubs of New Zealand in Colour (1975)
- Eagle's 100 Shrubs and Climbers of New Zealand (1978)
- Eagle's 100 Trees of New Zealand (1978)
- Eagle's Trees and Shrubs of New Zealand (1982)
- Eagle's Complete Trees and Shrubs of New Zealand (2006; two volumes)
  - Supplement, Additional Notes (2006)
  - Second Supplement, Historical Notes (2014)
- The Essential Audrey Eagle (2013)

== Honours and awards ==
In 1976, Eagle received a Nature Conservation Council Citation, and she also won two Watties Book of the Year Awards (now the Ockham New Zealand Book Awards): third prize in 1976 for Trees and Shrubs of New Zealand, and second prize in 1983 for Trees and Shrubs of New Zealand: Second Series. In 1985, Eagle won the Loder Cup and in the same year became a Distinguished Life Member of the Royal Forest and Bird Protection Society.

Eagle was appointed a Companion of the New Zealand Order of Merit in the 2001 Queen's Birthday Honours, for services to botanical art. In 2007, the 2006 two-volume edition of Eagle's Complete Trees and Shrubs of New Zealand earned her the Montana Medal for Non-Fiction and the Booksellers Choice award. The University of Otago conferred an honorary doctor of science degree on her in Dunedin at a graduation ceremony on 4 May 2013.

In 2017, Eagle was selected as one of the Royal Society Te Apārangi's "150 women in 150 words", celebrating the contributions of women to knowledge in New Zealand.
