= École de management de Normandie =

French business school

EM Normandie Business School
- École de Management de Normandie
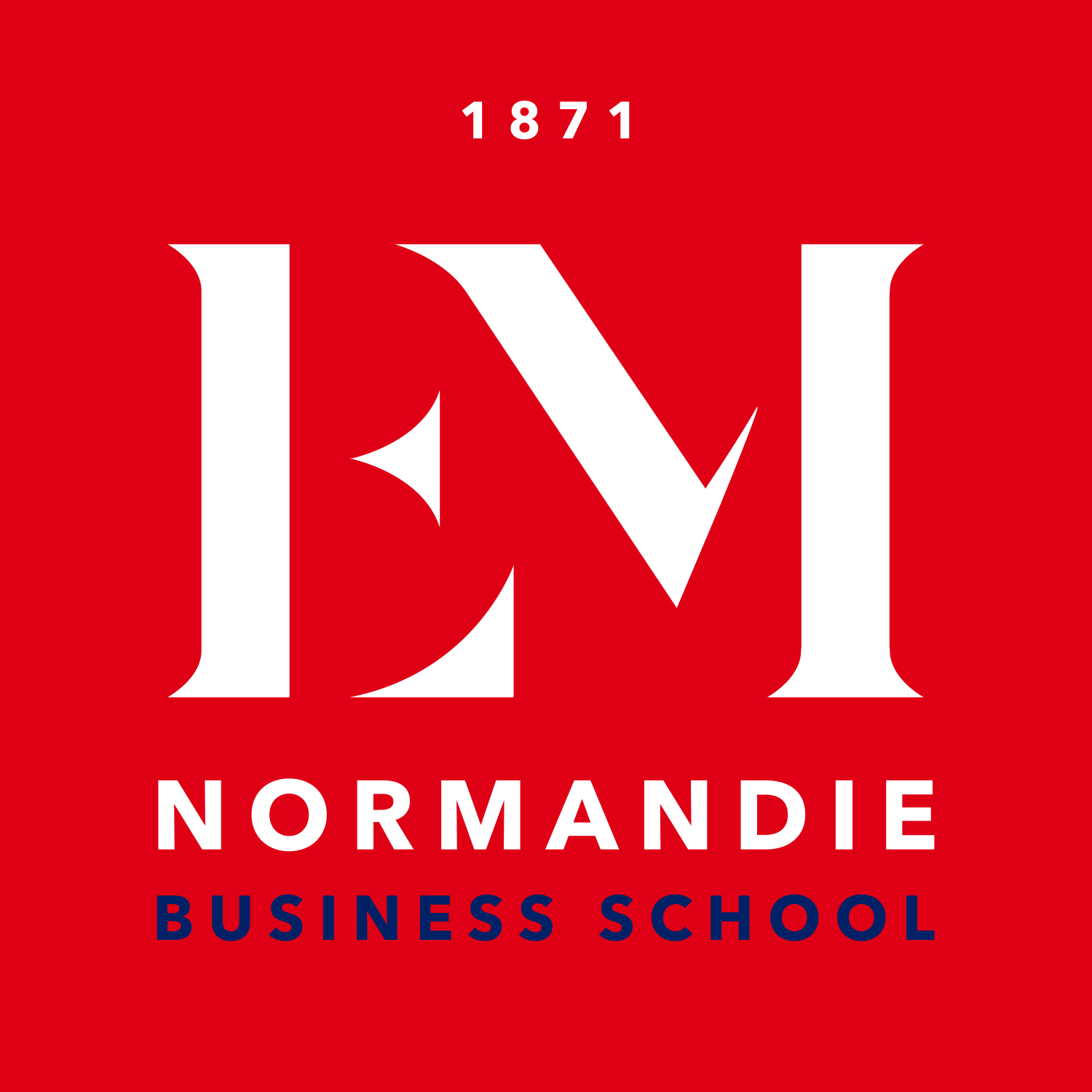
- Motto: Opening tomorrow's worlds since 1871
- Type: Grande école de commerce et de management (Private research university Business school)
- Established: 1871; 155 years ago
- Accreditation: Triple accreditation: AACSB; EQUIS; AMBA
- Academic affiliations: Conférence des grandes écoles;
- President: François Raoul-Duval
- Academic staff: 105 permanent professors 100% Ph.D. 40% female; 53% international
- Students: 5,800 students. 18% international 65 nationalities
- Location: France: Caen, Le Havre, Paris; Ireland: Dublin; UK: Oxford; UAE: Dubai
- Language: English-only & French-only instruction
- Colors: Red and Orange
- Website: www.em-normandie.com

The École de Management de Normandie (also known as EM Normandie Business School) is a business school created in 1871. Incorporated as a Higher Education & Research non-profit association (under the 1901 Act) and operating under private law, it has campuses in Caen, Dublin, Le Havre, Oxford, Paris and Dubai. It is one of the oldest business schools in France and worldwide, and holds a triple accreditation by EQUIS, AACSB, and AMBA. In 2015, EM Normandie was selected to appear in the ranking of the Financial Times of the best masters in management in the world (69th).

In January 2013, EM Normandie launched its new “Values & Performance” Strategic Plan, to guarantee further strategic consistency, to capitalize on its multi-campus experience, to apply active learning, and to serve the Normandy territory in partnership with its entire business community. This has brought new dimensions to the School's ambitions and reputation, thanks to the La SmartEcole® project and further partnerships with the University of Caen Normandy and the Grenoble School of Management.

== History ==
Coat of arms of Normandy

- 1871 - Ecole Supérieure de Commerce du Havre (ESC Le Havre) is founded by Jules and Jacques Siegfried.
- 1947 - ESC Le Havre programs are approved by the French Ministry of National Education
- 1977 - Research agreement between Le Havre Chamber of Commerce & Industry, the Grand Port Maritime du Havre, and Ecole Nationale des Ponts et Chaussées (Paris).
- 1982 - Formation of Groupe ESC Normandie: ESC Le Havre and a new international program in Caen created by the Le Havre and Caen Chambers of Commerce & Industry.
- 1987 - Creates an undergraduate, Bachelor's program
- 1988 - Joins the Conférence des Grandes Ecoles (CGE)
- 2004 - Groupe ESC Normandie becomes École de management de Normandie (EM Normandie) along with a new legal structure.
- 2007 - EM Normandie becomes a private, non-profit institution
- 2012 - Joins the Union of Independent Grandes Écoles as a full Member.
- 2013 - Opens a new campus in Paris
- 2014 - Opens a new campus in Oxford, UK
- 2016 - Awarded EQUIS accreditation
- 2017 - Opens a new campus in Dublin, Ireland
- 2019 - Awarded AACSB accreditation
- 2020 - Inauguration of a new Le Havre Campus
- 2022 - Has become a triple crown accredited school with the AMBA accreditation

== Grande École System ==
EM Normandie Business School is a grande école, a French institution of higher education that is separate from, but parallel and connected to the main framework of the French public university system. Similar to the Ivy League in the United States, Oxbridge in the UK, and C9 League in China, grandes écoles are elite academic institutions that admit students through an extremely competitive process. Alums go on to occupy elite positions within government, administration, and corporate firms in France.

Although they are more expensive than public universities in France, Grandes Écoles typically have smaller class sizes and student bodies, and many of their programs are taught in English. International internships, study abroad opportunities, and close ties with government and the corporate world are a hallmark of the Grandes Écoles. Out of the 250 business schools in France, only 39 are Conférence des Grandes Écoles (CGE) members, and many of the top ranked business schools in Europe are CGE members .

Degrees from EM Normandie are accredited by the Conférence des Grandes Écoles, and awarded by the Ministry of National Education (France). Higher education business degrees in France are organized into three levels thus facilitating international mobility: the Licence/Bachelor's, Master's, and Doctorate degrees. A Bachelor's degree is awarded requires the completion of 180 ECTS credits (bac+3); a Master's, requires an additional120 ECTS credits (bac+5). The highly coveted PGE (Program Grand École) ends with the awarding of Master's in Management (M.M.) degree.

In addition to the French Ministry of Education (French: Le Ministère de L'éducation Nationale), EM Normandie is further accredited by two elite international business school accrediting organizations: The European Foundation for Management Development (EQUIS) and The Association to Advance Collegiate Schools of Business (AACSB) In 2022, the Financial Times ranked its Masters in Management program 72nd in the world.

== International ==
EM Normandie has more than 200 partner universities around the world in more than 50 different countries, in which a student can be allowed to spend one or two semesters as an exchange student. 9 Foreign Languages are taught in the 5 campus. Approximately 730 international students are hosted every year. More than 30% of the full-time faculty are foreign. It offers the possibility to follow undergraduate and postgraduate programmes 100% in English.

EM Normandie's partner universities include:

- BI Norwegian Business School
- Curtin University
- Erasmus University Rotterdam
- Goethe University Frankfurt
- HHL Leipzig Graduate School of Management
- Hong Kong Baptist University
- ISCTE – University Institute of Lisbon
- KU Leuven
- Maastricht University
- Nanyang Technological University
- Nord University
- Norwegian School of Economics
- Nottingham Trent University
- Instituto Tecnológico y de Estudios Superiores de Monterrey
- Politecnico di Milano
- Prague University of Economics and Business
- Tilburg University
- University of Bamberg
- University of Gothenburg
- University of Groningen
- University of Ljubljana
- University of North Florida
- University of Portsmouth
- University of Regensburg
- University of Zurich
- Vilnius University

EM Normandie has three campuses abroad:

- Dubai, United Arab Emirates
- Dublin, Ireland
- Oxford, UK

In these campuses, all courses are taught 100% in English language.

== Values ==
The teaching approach of EM Normandie has been founded on 3 pillars: Boldness, Loyalty and Fortitude.

== Campuses ==
The EM Normandie has 5 campuses, with three campuses based in Caen, Le Havre and Paris, and two campuses abroad in Oxford and Dublin.

=== Le Havre ===
Le Havre is a major French city located some 50 kilometres (31 miles) west of Rouen on the shore of the English Channel and at the mouth of the River Seine. Its port is the second largest in France, after Marseille, for total traffic, and the largest French container port. Le Havre Campus is the historic campus of EM Normandie.The old campus was located only 200 meters from the Marina. In September 2020, Le Havre Campus will open, it is at the heart of a maritime metropolis. This new campus is a new building of 12,700 m2 building, open and futuristic.

=== Caen ===
Caen is a commune in northwestern France. It is the prefecture of the Calvados department and the capital of the Lower Normandy region.

Caen Campus in the second main campus of EM Normandie with 7000 square meters. It holds 5 amphitheaters, 5 computer rooms, 2 language laboratories, 1 media library, and many classrooms. In September 2016, EM Normandie built an extension of 2000 square meters to respond to its increasing activity in the Post-Bac selection.

=== Paris ===
The Paris campus is located in Paris 16th District. It receives undergraduate and postgraduate students.

=== Oxford ===
Oxford Campus is sharing buildings with the City of Oxford College (Activate Learning), it is close to transport links and the new Westgate Shopping Centre. It offers a café, a canteen, a gym, a library and a hair and beauty salon. All the courses are taught 100% in English. The prestigious Master Banking, Finance and FinTech is dispensed on this campus.

=== Dublin ===
Dublin Campus is located near the financial district. It is the second campus abroad which has been opened in 2017. All the courses are taught 100% in English.

== Noteworthy alumni ==
- Shonnead Dégremont (graduated in 2018), founder of Petites Culottées.
- Louis Haincourt (graduated in 2018), founder of Dealer de coque and co-founder of Mama Poké.
- Vincent Porquet (graduated in 2011), co-founder of Fizzer (post card).
- Orelsan (graduated in 2004), French rapper, songwriter, record producer, actor and film director.
- Patrick Bourdet (graduated in 2003), president of Areva Med and author of Rien n'est joué d'avance published by Fayard.
- Michael Ferrière (graduated in 2002), co-founder of One Each.
- Frédéric Daruty de Grandpré (graduated in 1991), president and director of the publication of 20 Minutes.
- Michel Wolfovski (graduated in 1982), financial director of Club Méditerranée.
- Claude Changarnier (graduated in 1982), former vice-president finance and administration Microsoft international.
- Frédérique Clavel (graduated in 1981), president of the federation Les Pionnières and founder of Fincoah Le Hub.
- Michel Langrand (graduated in 1976), former president of Velux France.
