= Michael Kenna =

Michael Kenna may refer to

- Michael Kenna (politician) (1857-1946), American politician
- Michael Kenna (photographer) (born 1953), English photographer
