= Christine Michel Carter =

American author

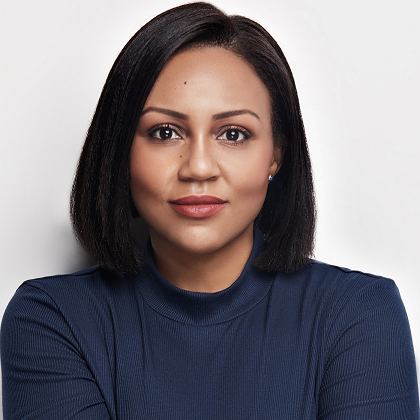
- Born: Christine Michel Epps; Baltimore, Maryland, U.S.
- Other names: Christine Carter, Christine M. Carter, Christine M. Epps, cmichelcarter
- Education: Stevenson University
- Occupations: Author; writer; marketing strategist
- Children: 2

Christine Michel Carter (née Epps) is an American author and marketing strategist from Baltimore, Maryland.

== Career ==
=== Writing ===
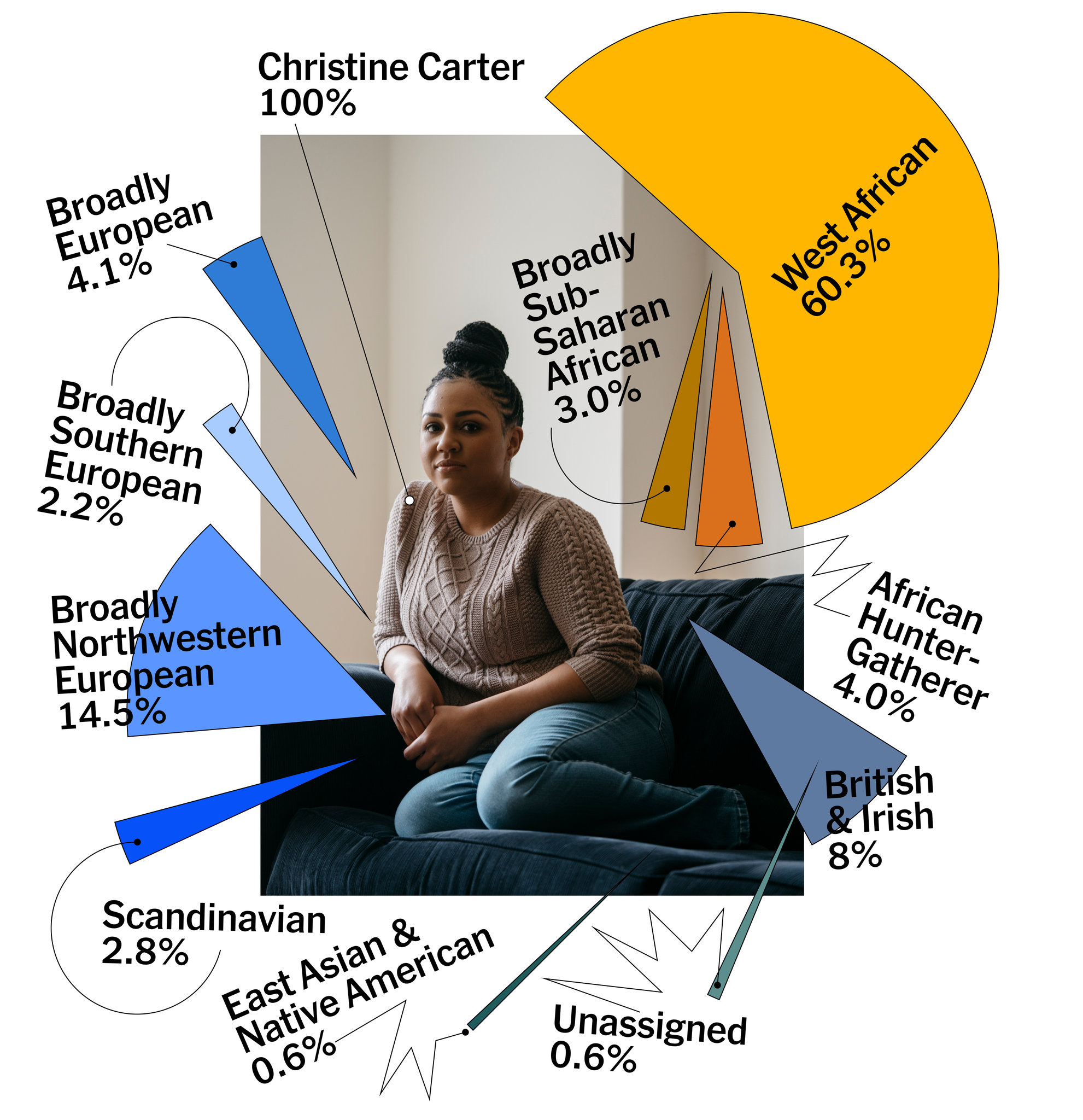
Carter featured in an article in The New York Times, "Are Genetic Testing Sites the New Social Networks?"

Since 2016, Carter has written for TIME, Forbes, and other national outlets. Through her writing, public commentary, and engagement with policymakers, Carter has addressed issues related to family policy, workplace inequities, maternal health disparities, and race-conscious approaches to health and labor reform. A viral HuffPost article Carter wrote titled "I Celebrated Black History Month… By Finding Out I Was White" led to her being interviewed by The New York Times and BBC. Carter primarily writes about generation Alpha, from the perspective of both marketing strategist and parent.

=== Advocacy ===
Carter is an advocate for caregivers, specifically working mothers. She documented her experience pumping in a bathroom while working for an employer violating the Fair Labor Standards Act. In 2020, Carter was interviewed by Bozoma Saint John on her podcast with Katie Couric titled "Back to Biz with Katie and Boz", where she was nicknamed “the mom of mom influencers".

Before Vice President Kamala Harris reintroduced the Maternal Care Access and Reducing Emergencies (CARE) Act in May 2019, Carter interviewed Harris for Parents. The interview occurred February 21, 2019, one month after Harris officially announced her candidacy for president of the United States in the 2020 United States presidential election. When Carter asked Harris about the maternal mortality disparity faced by women of color, Harris stated:

"We need to speak the uncomfortable truth that women—and especially Black women—are too often not listened to or taken seriously by the health care system, and therefore they are denied the dignity that they deserve. And we need to speak this truth because today, the United States is 1 of only 13 countries in the world where the rate of maternal mortality is worse than it was 25 years ago. That risk is even higher for Black women, who are three to four times more likely than white women to die from pregnancy-related causes. These numbers are simply outrageous."

In May 2023, Christine Michel Carter endorsed the Black Maternal Health Momnibus Act when it was reintroduced to Congress by Representative Lauren Underwood and Senator Cory Booker under the Black Maternal Health Caucus. The legislation consists of 13 individual bills and aims to address the maternal health crisis in the United States. Senator Chris Van Hollen, cosponsor of the Black Maternal Health Momnibus Act, recognized Carter in 2021 for going "above and beyond in ensuring that Black Moms and Moms of Color have access to important health information for their children and families."

Carter participated in the #ShareTheMicNow Instagram initiative alongside authors Luvvie Ajayi and Bozoma Saint John. On June 10, 2020, 52 Black women took over the Instagram feeds of 52 white women with large platforms to draw attention to the work they're doing in order to catalyze change. Carter took over the Instagram account of Rachel Bloom. Carter has also spoke out against Black Women’s Equal Pay Day, stating the path to racial and gender equity in the workplace will involve “radical action."

Carter is a council member on the Caring Across Generations Business Care Council, a group that changes the way our culture and policies value and support caregiving. She is also a council member on the SeekHer Foundation's Advocacy Council, a non-profit organization that advocates for women's mental health. The SeekHer Foundation partnered with Pure Leaf to give mothers grants totaling $200,000 in 2021 and $400,000 in 2022; Carter is one of the grant application reviewers. Carter is an advisory board member of The Policy Center for Maternal Mental Health, a national policy organization that advanced The Pregnant Workers Fairness Act and the PUMP for Nursing Mothers Act legislation in 2022.

=== Influence ===
==== Scholarly and media citations ====
Carter has been cited by or contributed to the books of numerous authors, including You and I, as Mothers: A Raw and Honest Guide to Motherhood by Laura Prepon, the Harvard Business Review Working Parent Series, and additional published works.

==== Legal and policy citations ====
Carter’s work has been cited in legal briefs, policy studies, and academic materials. In 2022, the Independent Women’s Law Center cited her 2018 Forbes article, "Why Millennial Moms Are Seeing Accelerated Success Working From Home", in an amicus curiae brief to the Supreme Court of Ohio in Schaad v. Alder, a case concerning the municipal taxation of remote workers during the COVID-19 pandemic. In 2023, a coalition including the Black Economic Alliance Foundation, the Executive Leadership Council, the National Bankers Association, U.S. Black Chambers, Inc., and the National Association of Investment Companies cited her 2021 Forbes article, "Black Female-Founded Companies Need Funding, Not Accelerators or Incubators", in an amicus brief to the U.S. Court of Appeals for the Eleventh Circuit in American Alliance for Equal Rights v. Fearless Fund. Her reporting is also referenced in public-health legal resources published by the Public Health Law Center at Mitchell Hamline School of Law and in a European Parliament study on the gendered impacts of the COVID-19 crisis.

In 2025, Carter’s Forbes article, "Five Years Later, Working Mothers Continue to Leave the Workforce" was cited during debate over Congressman Mark Messmer's Empowering Employer Child and Elder Care Solutions Act, with Democratic members referencing the article to support the argument that caregiving costs contribute to women leaving the workforce and that the proposed legislation may not address broader structural issues.

==== Recognition ====
The TODAY sho named Carter one of the "funniest parents on social media" four times in 2020 and 2021. In 2023, she won a Folio Eddie Award for an open letter in Parents magazine titled "An Open Letter to Black Birthing People During Black Maternal Health Week".

=== Other work ===
In 2020, Carter trademarked "Mompreneur and Me", a national professional development event for female business owners and their children. She is an angel investor in Lilu, a breast pumping device, Cradlewise, an AI-powered smart crib and bassinet, and beauty tech company MYAVANA.

In 2023, Carter hosted a podcast for Bright Horizons titled "The Work-Life Equation". Guests included Minda Harts, Indra Nooyi, and Deborah Cox.

== Bibliography ==
- MOM AF (2019)
- Can Mommy Go To Work? (2019)

== Personal life ==
Carter is divorced. She has two children from her previous marriage: a daughter born in 2011 and a son born in 2015.

In 2020, she and her children starred in a digital marketing campaign for Walmart titled "Camp Walmart."

== See also ==
- Generation Alpha
- Mompreneur
- Activism
