= Otago Regional Herbarium =

Herbarium based at the University of Otago, Dunedin, New Zealand

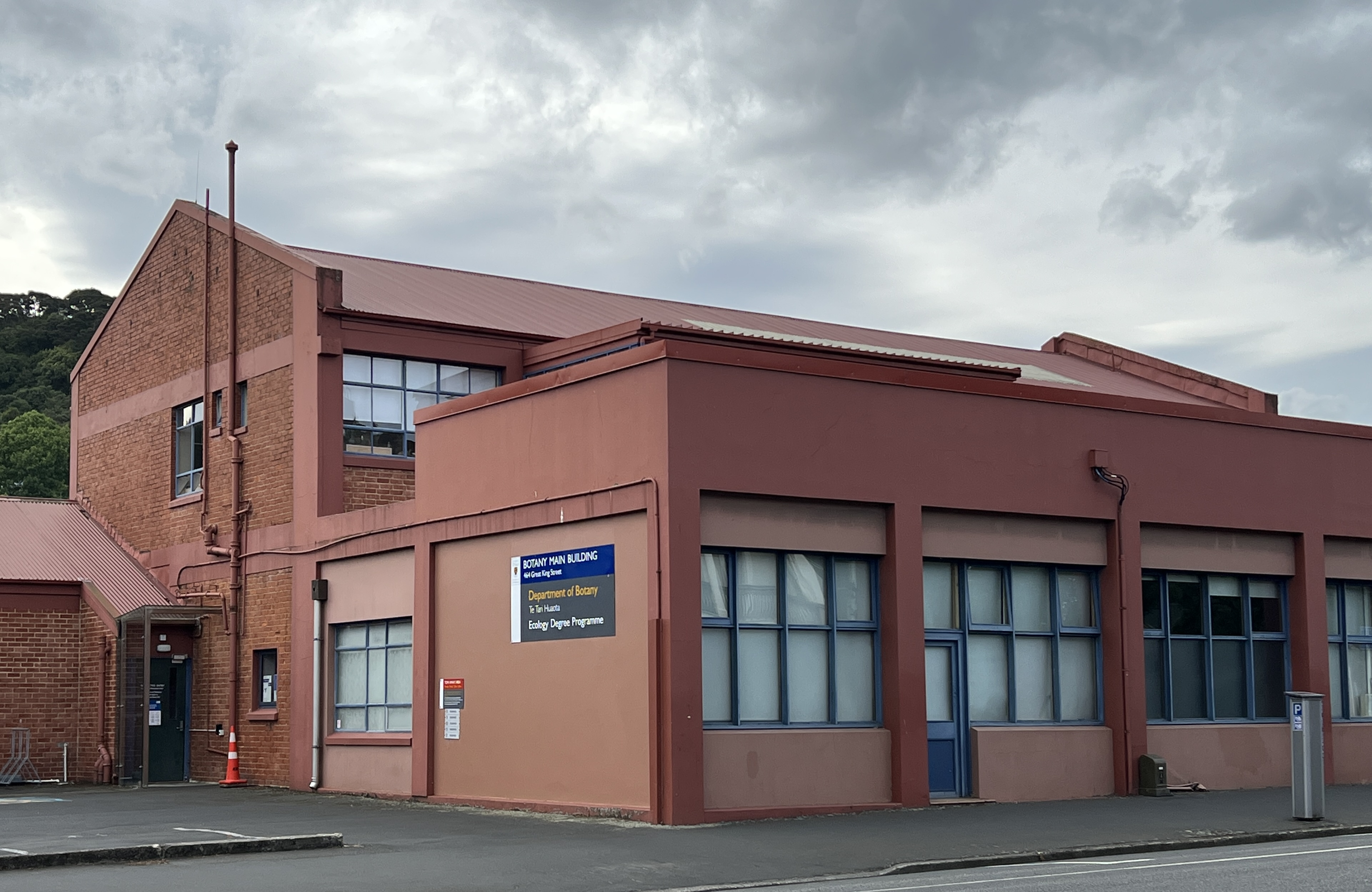
- The herbarium is located in the Department of Botany, University of Otago, Dunedin, New Zealand
- Established: 1946
- Address: Botany Department, University of Otago, 464 Great King Street, Dunedin
- Location: Dunedin, Otago, New Zealand
- Website: www.otago.ac.nz/botany/herbarium/index.html

The Otago Regional Herbarium is a herbarium based at the University of Otago, in Dunedin, in the South Island of New Zealand. It has the herbarium code OTA. It has 72,000 items, making it the second largest herbarium in the South Island.

== History ==
The herbarium was established in 1946 by botanist Geoff Baylis. As of 2020, the vascular plant, bryophyte and lichen collection is curated by Janice Lord, and the fungal and slime mold collection by David Orlovich.

== Collections ==
The collection includes more than 120 type specimens. There are approximately 15,000 lichen accessions, circa 10,000 bryophyte accessions, 3000 algae accessions and approximately 44,000 vascular plant accessions. The specimens are not yet fully databased.

The lichen collection includes many type specimens described by David Galloway for the Flora of New Zealand – Lichens volume. The lichen collection is considered to be of national significance, as it incorporates the Thompson collection (3500 South Island lichen specimens) and the Murray collection (c. 3000 specimens, mainly South Island, collected by James Murray (1923–1961) who is considered New Zealand's first modern lichenologist).

Professor Alan Mark contributed many of the specimens of alpine flora in the vascular plant collection.

The herbarium also houses the collection and voucher specimens belonging to botanical illustrator Audrey Eagle, used to illustrate the two volumes of Eagle's Complete Trees and Shrubs of New Zealand.
