= Michael Kenna (photographer) =

British photographer

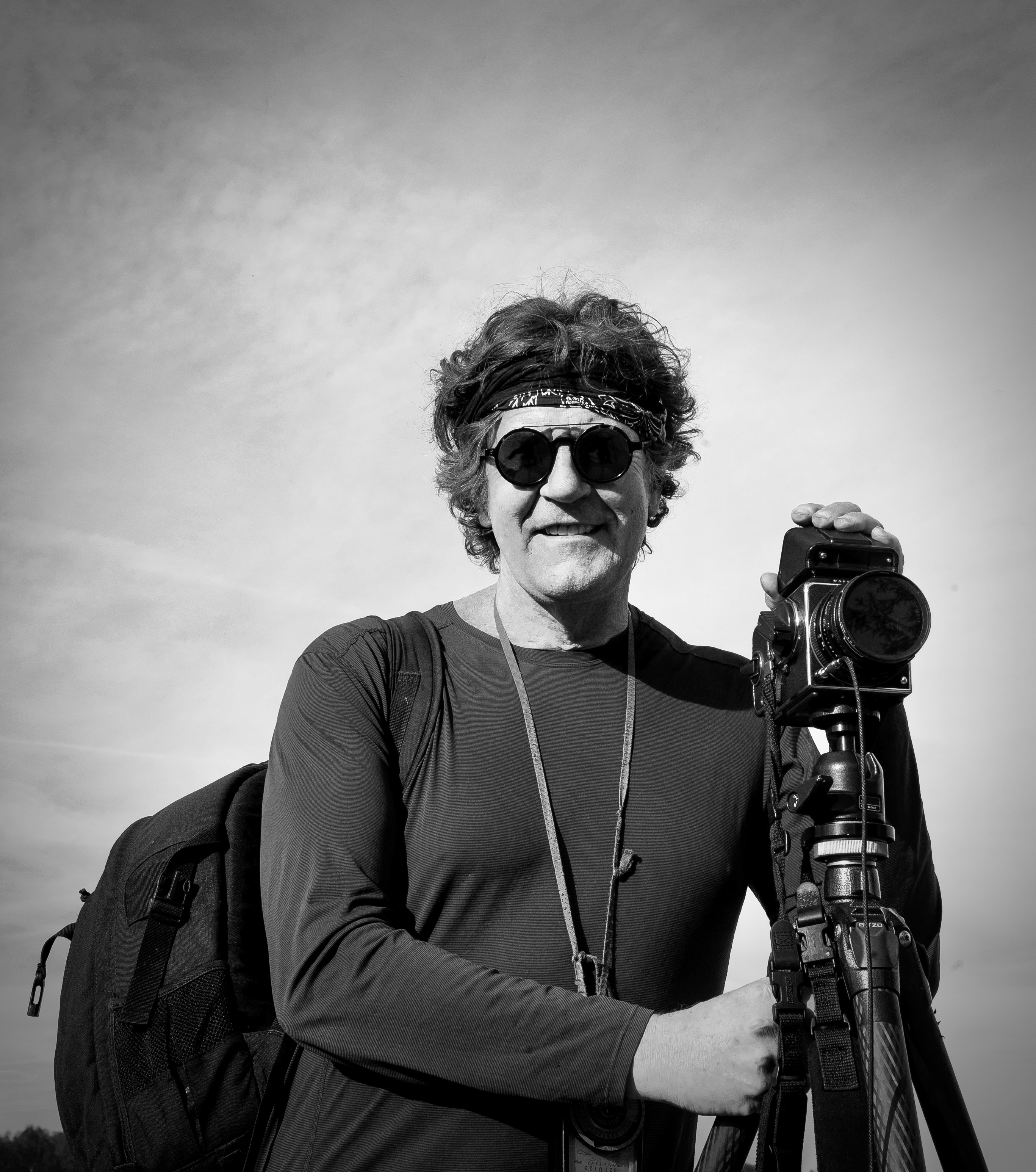
- Born: 1953 (age 72–73); Widnes, Lancashire, England
- Education: London College of Printing Banbury School of Art St Joseph's College
- Known for: Photography
- Awards: Chevalier of the Order of Arts and Letters
- Website: michaelkenna.com

Michael Kenna (born 1953) is an English photographer best known for his unusual black and white landscapes featuring ethereal light achieved by photographing at dawn or at night with exposures of up to 10 hours. His photos concentrate on the interaction between ephemeral atmospheric condition of the natural landscape, and human-made structures and sculptural mass.

Many books have been published of his work, the subjects of which range from The Rouge, in Dearborn Michigan, to the snow-covered island of Hokkaido, Japan. Kenna's work is also held in permanent collections at the Bibliothèque Nationale, Paris, The National Gallery of Art, Washington DC, Tokyo Metropolitan Museum of Photography, and the Victoria and Albert Museum in London.

== Biography ==
Kenna was born in 1953 in the industrial town of Widnes in the northwest of England. Kenna grew up with five siblings in a poor, working-class, Irish-Catholic family. He attended seminary school for seven years (until age 17), with the intention of becoming a priest. After discovering his talent for art, he decided against joining the holy priesthood in favor of a more creative career, despite the fact that his family would not have considered his interest a realistic livelihood option.

After a year at the Banbury School of Art, where he received his first photographic instruction, Kenna applied to the London College of Printing in both the graphic design and commercial photography departments, figuring he would go with the one that accepted him first (he graduated from the latter, in 1976). While pursuing his hobby of landscape photography, he took every chance to practice his craft commercially. He photographed theater dress rehearsals, and for record companies and the press; assisted other photographers, and sold stock photos of Henri Cartier-Bresson, Cornell Capa, Marc Riboud and Jacques-Henri Lartigue for the John Hillelson Agency on Fleet Street.

In 1977, Kenna moved to San Francisco for the opportunity to show and sell his work in galleries. There, he met Ruth Bernhard, who hired him as her printer in 1977. Over the next eight years, she introduced him to the creative potential of the printing process, in her unique methods of manipulating and interpreting a negative.

== Work ==
Kenna's photography focuses on unusual landscapes with ethereal light achieved by photographing at dawn or at night with exposures of up to 10 hours. Since about 1986 he has mainly used Hasselblad medium format and Holga cameras and this accounts for the square format of most of his photographs. The main exception was for the photographs in Monique's Kindergarten for which a 4×5 large format camera was employed.

His work has been shown in galleries and museum exhibitions in Asia, Australia and Europe. He has photographs in the collections of the National Gallery of Art in Washington, D.C., the Patrimoine photographique in Paris, the Museum of Decorative Arts in Prague, and the Victoria and Albert Museum in London. His photography of the ruins of concentration camps was featured in the opening credits of the Holocaust film Esther's Diary (2010).

Kenna has also done commercial work for such clients as Volvo, Rolls-Royce, Audi, Sprint, Dom Perignon and The Spanish Tourism Board.

In 2000, the Ministry of Culture in France made Kenna a Chevalier in the Order of Arts and Letters.

In 2022, the Ministry of Culture in France made Kenna an Officer in the Order of Arts and Letters.

In 2022, Kenna also donated his life's archive to France's Library of Heritage and Photography.

== Publications ==
- Michael Kenna Photographs. Stephen Wirtz Gallery and The Weston Gallery, 1984
- The Hound of the Baskervilles. Arion, 1985; Northpoint, 1986
- 1976-1986. Gallery Min, 1987
- Night Walk. Friends of Photography, 1988
- Michael Kenna. Min Gallery, 1990
- Le Desert de Retz. Arion, 1990
- The Elkhorn Slough and Moss Landing. The Elkhorn Slough Foundation, 1991
- A Twenty Year Retrospective. Treville, 1994; Portland, OR: Nazraeli, 2002
- The Rouge. Ram, 1995
- The Silverado Squatters. Arion, 1996
- Monique's Kindergarten. Portland, OR: Nazraeli, 1997
- Le Notre's Gardens. The Huntington Library, Art Collections Library and RAM Publishing, 1997 and 1999
- Night Work. Portland, OR: Nazraeli, 2000
- Impossible to Forget: The Nazi Camps Fifty Years After. Marval; Nazraeli, 2001
- Easter Island. Portland, OR: Nazraeli, 2001
- Japan. Portland, OR: Nazraeli; Treville, 2002
- Calais Lace. Portland, OR: Nazraeli, 2003
- Boarding School. Portland, OR: Nazraeli, 2003
- Ratcliffe Power Station. OR: Nazraeli, 2004
- Retrospective Two. Portland, OR: Nazraeli; Treville, 2004
- Hokkaido. Portland, OR: Nazraeli, 2005
- Montecito Garden. Portland, OR: Nazraeli, 2007
- Mont St Michel. Portland, OR: Nazraeli, 2007
- Mont-Saint-Michel. 21st, 2007
- Images of the Seventh Day, 2011
- In France. Portland, OR: Nazraeli, 2012
- Abruzzo. Italy, OR: Nazraeli, 2017
- One Sunday in Beijing. Paris: Bessard, 2018. Edition of 700 copies.
- Beyond Architecture. Prestel, NY, London, Munich. 2019 ISBN 978-3-7913-8582-2
- Northern England 1983–1986. Paso Robles, California: Nazraeli, 2021. ISBN 978-1-59005-544-1.
- Forms Of Japan. Prestel, London. 2022. ISBN 978-3791388267
- Trees. Paris, Skira, 2023. ISBN 978-2370741943.
- Photographs and Stories. Paso Robles, California: Nazraeli, 2023. ISBN 978-1590055939.
- Constellation. SKIRA Paris, 2025. ISBN 978-2370742841

== Awards ==
- Imogen Cunningham Award, San Francisco, California, USA, 1981
- Art in Public Buildings Award, California Arts Council Commission, Sacramento, California, USA, 1987
- Institute for Aesthetic Development Award, Pasadena, California, USA, 1989
- Golden Saffron Award, Consuegra, Spain, 1996
- Chevalier of the Order of Arts and Letters, Ministry of Culture, France, 2000
- Honorary Master of Arts, Brooks Institute, Santa Barbara, California, USA, 2003
- Hae-sun Lee Photography Award, Photographic Artist Association of Korea, Seoul, Korea, 2013
- Special Photographer Award, Higashikawa, Hokkaido, Japan, 2016
- Officer of the Order of Arts and Letters, Ministry of Culture, France, 2022
