= Work–life balance in the United States =

Average annual hours actually worked per worker in OECD countries from 1970 to 2020

Work–life balance in the United States is having enough time for work and enough time to have a personal life in the United States. Although related, but in a much broader sense, terms include lifestyle balance and life balance. The most important thing in work and life is the personal ability to demonstrate and meet the needs of work and personal life to achieve goals. People should learn to deal with role engagement management, role conflict management, and manage life needs to achieve balance. Balance is about how to achieve the desired work and life satisfaction properly, and needs in a conflict situation.

== United States history ==
=== Agricultural work: 1800–1850 ===
The first enforceable hours' law in the United States was in 1874 when Massachusetts enacted a law which limited the amount of time that women and children could work each week. This limit was set at sixty hours per week. Similar laws were later adopted by about half of the country's states. Only men in exceptionally hazardous jobs were covered in early legislation and most had no limit to the number of hours their employees could have them work.

Ten-hour workdays were accepted in the agriculture industry during certain seasons and six-day workweeks were not unheard of. Bakers did not win the right to work less than ten hours per day until 1905 with the court case of Lochner v. New York.

The general presumption during this period was that the courts would allow regulation of labor concerning women and children, who were thought to be incapable of bargaining on an equal footing with employers and in special need of protection. Men were allowed freedom of contract unless it could be proven that regulating their hours served a higher good for the population at large.

=== Industrial work–life: 1850s–1970 ===
During the turn of the twentieth century, the push for an eight-hour workday was geared primarily toward raising the hourly wage. The idea was that by maintaining the current weekly pay while lowering working hours, a fairer rate of pay would result. The slogan, "Whether you work by the piece or work by the day, decreasing the hours increases the pay," seemed to carry the mood of the day.

The early twentieth century laid the groundwork for the idea of work–life balance. Advancements in social sciences would move the focus towards the impact of long hours on the physical and mental health of the employee. At this time, however, the new information was used to enhance productivity for the company. The shorter hours movement began to focus on the fact that an overworked employee is more prone to injury or mistake and becomes less productive. Josephine Goldmark wrote a book in 1912 detailing this fact and the Federal Public Works Act was passed the same year.

This new act required a 40-hour workweek for employees of government contracted firms. Over the next ten years, the government passed legislation requiring a 40-hour work week for individual industries nearly every time the issue arose in court. When the employees of the steel industry failed to obtain a reduction from their 84-hour work week in 1919, the industry soon allowed their employees an eight-hour workday, a four-hour-per-day reduction—a move brought about by much "arm-twisting" on the part of President Harding.

By the 1920s, the average work week was fifty hours and was considered a great stride and well-earned award for America's working man. The push for fewer hours had come to a close, but they had one more hurdle to overcome. The new concentration was on the ability to work half a day on Saturdays or have the day off completely. The ability to have two days of rest was unprecedented but was considered vital to finalize an ethical work schedule. Pressure was put on businesses to make the change, especially in industries and cities with a large number of Jewish workers (Jewish Sabbath is on Saturday), and they finally achieved this goal by the end of the decade. Where only thirty-two firms had a five-day workweek in 1920, nearly half had adopted the practice by 1927.

Their success was short-lived. In the 1920s, the workers were coaxed into believing that they wanted to work longer hours and that they would be harmed by measures that limited how many hours they were allowed to work. Social scientists would later name this force the "gospel of consumption." Beginning in the 1920s, advertisers persuaded Americans that happiness would not come from leisure time, but from purchasing commodities, and he concluded that this made it easier for managers to "allow" workers to make more money by working longer hours.

A small scale Federal childcare program to take care of children of women working in some American factories such as Kaiser Shipyards operated from the 1920s thru World War II, at which time the program was discontinued.

Social scientists would conclude that a new work ethic began as Americans left the psychology of scarcity and adopted one of abundance. Some argue that this mentality of consumption or "consumerism" persists to this day. During the twentieth century, the average workweek has changed drastically. In 1900, the average workweek in manufacturing was approximately fifty-three hours. However, the workweek is responsive to business conditions. During the Great Depression, the average number of hours for production workers in manufacturing dropped to 34.6 each week. During World War II, hours worked rose to forty-five each week.

The normal range of hours worked during the four decades after World War II was thirty-nine to forty-one hours; however, starting in the 1990s, factory workweek hours began to exceed forty-one hours. As previously mentioned, Americans work approximately 47.1 hours each week; some employees work up to seventy hours. Therefore, it is safe to state that the average number of hours Americans presently work each week is the highest it has been in nearly seventy-five years.

In 1900, only nineteen percent of women of working age were in the labor force. In 1999 sixty percent of women worked outside the home. Even if the hours worked were slightly higher at the turn of the century, most households were supported by one paycheck. "In 1900, eighty percent of American children had a working father and a stay-at-home mother; however, by 1999, that figure was only twenty-four percent."

During the Great Depression, working hours were reduced. By 1932, approximately fifty percent of Americans were working a shortened work week. Instead of reducing wages, employers decided to lay off many workers and attempted to protect the employees that remained by encouraging them to job share. President Herbert Hoover's Commission for Work Sharing pushed voluntary hours reductions, and it is estimated that nearly three to five million jobs had been saved. Companies such as Sears, General Motors, and Standard Oil reduced the number of days worked each week, and Akron began a six-hour workday. The AFL began to call for a federally mandated 30-hour workweek.

By 1933, some experts were predicting that the "thirty-hour workweek was within a month of becoming federal law." Congress began hearings on mandating the 30-hour workweek, and the Senate even passed the bill (which was written by Hugo Black and sponsored in the House by William Connery) fifty-three to thirty. Newly elected President, Franklin Roosevelt initially supported the bill, but had second thoughts when he realized that the bill had a provision to forbid importation of goods produced by workers who worked longer than thirty hours a week. Instead, Roosevelt began to support the National Industrial Recovery Act. Labor leaders were encouraged to support the NIRA instead of the Black-Connery Thirty-Hour Bill with a guarantee of union organization and collective bargaining. With the threat of a mandated 30-hour work week, businesses "fell into line." When specifics codes for the NIRA were drawn up, shorter hours were no longer a genuine concern.

After the Great Depression ended, the average weekly hours worked began to rise. (According to the Bureau of Labor Statistics, in 1934 the average hours worked each week was approximately thirty-four hours). During World War II, hours increased by approximately ten hours a week but, in the aftermath of the war, weekly work hours averaged forty hours.

=== Informational work–life: 1970–2000 ===
With automation of the workplace in "full swing" by the 1970s, large numbers of women began entering the work force and an "awareness of stress rose to the forefront". In the publication Type A Behavior and Your Heart, cardiologists Meyer Friedman and Ray H. Rosenman wrote about the "hurry sickness" common to "workaholics"—people who had no friends and who "never relaxed or went to museums".

In the late 1970s, professor Robert Karasek of the University of Lowell (now known as University of Massachusetts Lowell) developed a method for analyzing stress-producing factors in the workplace. It has been widely employed to examine workplace pressures and their relationship with research data on coronary heart disease, musculoskeletal illnesses, psychological strain and absenteeism. Karasek explains, "In situations where an individual has high demands on him and low control, the undesirable stress of work and other situations becomes problematic."

The 1980s brought new complaints of work–life balance related stress. This time period was given such names as "the ME generation," "the age of narcissism" and "the pursuit of loneliness." The number of cases of emotional depression in the United States was believed to have doubled between 1970 and 1990.

"What you do is what you are" was the common and unhealthy assumption. According to 'The Workaholic Syndrome', written by Judith K. Sprankle and Henry Ebel, "By their sheer numbers and the consequently narrowing opportunities at every upward run of the organizational ladder, the baby-boomers have been compelled to do more, to move faster, to compete harder. They, in turn, have set the pace for other age groups. The signs of increased stress are legion and have been intensified by an economic climate that mandates that if we marry at all, we marry a working spouse."

In the late 1980s, the "computer revolution" was not only responsible for corporate downsizing, but also increased the demand of employee output. Social critic Jeremy Rifkin states, "Back in the agriculture-based society, people were more attuned to generatively, and middle-stress disorders and diseases of affluence were not part of life. They weren't triggered until the Industrial Age, and now the Information Age has worsened them. Nowadays, instead of seconds, it's nanoseconds. We have moved from designing a schedule that real people can execute in whatever time it takes them, to a program which people can monitor but can't affect."

In the 1980s, the number of workers' compensation claims for "gradual mental stress" began to rise. Claims rose from 1,844 cases in 1981 to 15,688 in 1999 in the state of California alone. Because of the large number of cases as well as evidence of numerous cases of fraud, efforts were made in the early 1990s to reform the workers compensation program. Led by Republican Governor of California Pete Wilson and Democratic Party State assembly Speaker Willie Brown, the new law stated that claimants had to prove that stress was at least 51 percent of the reason for their illness.

Unfortunately, because of these reforms some feel that it is now extremely difficult to be approved for workers compensation. John Burton, dean of the school of management and labor relations at Rutgers University said that part of the reason for the decline is that "a number of states made it difficult to get stress into the system. So even if the stress is out there, it's not showing up (in the compensation statistics). Some of it shows up in the rising violence, which is a crude proxy for the stress out there."

=== Digital work-life: 2000-present ===
In recent decades, work-life conflicts have continued. With the rise in prominence of 24-hour businesses and 12-hour shifts, the average work year for prime-age working couples in the United States increased by 700 hours between the late 1970s and the 1990s. As a result, a 2003 study found that one-third of all workers in the United States reported that their jobs were either often or always stressful. Work-life balance conflict has numerous negative effects on individuals, including increased risk for health concerns such as increased levels of stress, lower life satisfaction, higher rates of family conflict, increased chance for substance abuse and higher rates of juvenile delinquency. Employee problems of work-life balance also affect employers. These effects can include higher rates of absenteeism, reduced productivity, decreased job satisfaction, lower levels of commitment and loyalty and rising healthcare costs. The potential impacts of work-life balance conflict can hurt the individual, their family and their employer all at once.

Younger generations of workers have advocated more flexible work arrangements to accommodate various needs. They have brought attention to unrealistic expectations to juggle family responsibilities and work responsibilities in a healthy way. This is specifically challenging for recent and single parents. Another important point is that the responsibilities of housework often fall on women which reinforces traditional gender roles and responsibilities. This added pressure can be detrimental to mental health, job performance and overall satisfaction, amongst other harmful consequences. These gendered expectations to juggle work and home responsibilities must be taken into consideration when discussing policies on work-life balance. Policies that have successfully taken these ideas into consideration have seen positive results and a reduction in work-life conflict. Some examples of successful programs include establishing flex working, even for new employees, setting up a professional network of family support services such as child care and elder care, and offering multiple family leave options.

Some larger organizations have taken steps to reduce work-life conflict for their employees and mitigate potential consequences. Companies like Motorola, Hewlett-Packard and Eddie Bauer, amongst others, have seen success in implementing organisational change. Some of these programs have included on-site or subsidized child care, elder care, flex hours, job sharing, dependent care spending, increased access to employee assistance programs and specific training on the importance of work-life balance. Though these programs are not the norm and only occur in a small percentage of large organizations, they have had a positive effect on employees in multiple ways, such as improved recruiting and productivity and reduced absenteeism and employee turnover.

Many companies have taken a different approach and implemented programs focused on stress reduction for the individual worker. These programs have included training in stress reduction methods such as meditation and other forms of stress management, overall focusing on the individual responsibility for work-life balance conflict reduction. These types of programs have been found to have slight changes in job satisfaction but are overall not effective in lowering levels of stress and work-life conflict. This failure is largely due to the fact that these programs are focused on short-term changes. These programs may even cause more stress as they force workers to adjust the way they conduct business and to restructure their day-to-day schedule.

==== Work-life balance during the COVID-19 pandemic ====
Perspectives on work-life conflict were greatly affected by the COVID-19 pandemic as many workers and organizations were forced to shift to remote work or implement new safety protocols. Surveys showed that 54% of working adults stated they would like to continue working remotely full-time while 75% are open to working remotely occasionally. Flex working has become the new norm and has changed many people's perspectives on the intersection of work and life.

Gender has also played an important role in work-life conflict during the pandemic. With many working from and spending most of their time at home, differences in domestic responsibilities may have been brought to light. Typically, women are unequally responsible for housework and childcare, but having more family members home during the day has forced many to examine these inequalities and rethink the division of home responsibilities. The shift to remote work may have decreased work efficiency slightly, usually because of more distractions and responsibilities. At the same time, it was also proven to increase family involvement and life satisfaction, which has the potential to translate into more effective and productive work in the future. On the other hand, with the "normalization" of remote work, women who are unable to spend long hours on-site due to care chores may no longer be punished with promotions and salary increases. With increased life satisfaction and family engagement, individuals may be in better states of mind and consequently able to give more attention to their work. Many negative physical and mental consequences of work-life conflict are also reduced when one feels happier and more satisfied with their life. This reduction in distractions can allow workers to be more focused, productive, and engaged. Work-life balance is still a concept that is being explored and researched as many individuals continue to adapt because of the COVID-19 pandemic.

== American laws and policies regarding labor ==
=== Family and Medical Leave Act ===
The 1990s saw the introduction of additional laws designed to help the American worker. One current law that guarantees employees time off is the Family and Medical Leave Act of 1993 signed under U.S. President Bill Clinton. According to the Family and Medical Leave Act, any "eligible" employee is entitled to twelve weeks of leave for immediate family member need and medical reasons during a twelve-month period. An employee's spouse, children, and parents are considered immediate family.

The term "parent" does not include an employee's in-laws or children over the age of eighteen unless they are "incapable of self-care" because of mental or physical disability that limits one or more of the "major life activities." Employees are eligible to take FMLA leave if they have worked for their employer for at least twelve months, have worked at least 1,250 hours during the previous twelve months, and have worked at a company with a minimum of fifty employees that work either at that work site or at work sites within a seventy-five mile radius.

Employers may select one of four options for determining the required twelve-month period. They can decide to determine eligibility by the calendar year, by any fixed twelve-month "leave year" such as a fiscal year, a year required by state law, or a year starting on the employee's "anniversary" date, by the twelve-month period measured forward from the date when an employee's first FMLA leave begins, or by a "rolling" twelve-month period measured backward from the date an employee uses FMLA leave.

Pregnancy disability leave or maternity leave for the birth of a child would be considered qualifying FMLA leave. This law, however, does not guarantee paid time off; the FMLA only requires unpaid leave. However, the law permits an employee to elect, or the employer to require the employee, to use accrued paid leave, such as vacation or sick leave, for some or all of the FMLA leave period. It is unlawful for any employer to deny the right of any eligible employee the use of FMLA leave.

=== Small Necessities Leave Act ===
In addition to the Family Leave and Medical Act, there are many other federal and state statutes that allow employees legal time off from work. Massachusetts enacted the Small Necessities Leave Act in 1998 which expanded upon the rights guaranteed by the FMLA.

The Small Necessities Leave Act allows eligible employees a total of twenty-four hours of unpaid leave during any twelve-month period, "over and above" the leave granted by the FMLA. This act allows an employee to participate in school activities directly related to the "educational advancement" of his/her child. This includes parent-teacher conferences, "back to school" activities, and even interviewing for a new school.

The term "school" includes any public or private elementary or secondary schools, Head Start programs, and licensed children's day care centers. (Gallitano) The SNLA also allows employees to attend routine medical or dental appointments with their children. In addition, the employee is allowed to accompany an "elderly relative" to medical or dental appointments or any other services that provide professional services related to elder care. (The elderly relative must be at least sixty years old and be related by blood or marriage to the employee) The SNLA includes time off to arrange for professional care at a nursing home or rehabilitation facility.

The eligibility required for leave under the Small Necessities Leave Act is the same as for eligibility under the Family and Medical Leave Act and, like the FMLA, the employer is permitted to choose the method for determining which twelve-month period will apply when calculating the twenty-four hours of leave that may be taken by the employee. Leaves of absences can be taken intermittently.

For example, if the employee needs to take off two hours in the morning to attend a parent-teacher conference, the employer may not require the employee to take time off in blocks of half or full days. Also, the employer is given the option of requesting certification (from a physician or school, for example) for leave requests.

=== Massachusetts Maternity Leave Statute ===
Massachusetts created the Massachusetts Maternity Leave Statute in 1972. This law provides eight weeks of leave to female employees who have met certain criteria. This statute applies to all employers having six or more employees. Those eligible under the Massachusetts statute must be full-time employees who have completed three months of work. It also applies when an eligible female adopts a child under eighteen years old (or under twenty-three if the child is mentally or physically disabled). The employer can decide if this leave will be paid or unpaid. If the leave is unpaid, the employer must permit the employee to use accrued paid sick, vacation, or personal time, but the employer may not require the employee to use that accrued time.

=== Wage and Hour Law and "Day of Rest" Statute ===
Massachusetts also has a statute, known as the Wage and Hour Law, which creates a number of additional rights for employees regarding time off. Massachusetts law requires employers to provide a thirty-minute meal break to every employee who works more than six hours a day; it does not require that the meal break be paid. Another form of time off from work that is governed by the statute is the creation of "legal holidays."

Massachusetts law presently includes eleven legal holidays. If employees are required to work on a legal holiday (such as retail employees) they must be paid at a rate of one and a half times their normal pay rate. Massachusetts also has a "Day of Rest" statute that provides that all employees are entitled to one day off from work in seven calendar days.

=== Short- and long-term disability ===
Many employers offer short and /or long-term disability insurance to their employees. These plans offer wage replacement benefits for employees who are not able to work based on a physical or mental condition. There are no laws requiring an employer to grant paid vacations to its employees in Massachusetts. However, nearly all employers provide paid vacation benefits in some form in order to remain competitive.

=== Exemption status ===
Besides the different compensation structures between exempt and nonexempt workers (for example, exempt employees are excluded from minimum wage and are paid a salary rather than minimum wage; whereas, nonexempt employees must be paid at least the federal minimum wage for each hour worked), there are differences in overtime requirements and expectations.

Exempt employees are usually expected to work the number of hours necessary to complete their tasks, regardless of whether that requires thirty-five or fifty-five hours per week. On the other hand, nonexempt employees must be paid overtime if they work more than forty hours per week. If an exempt employee's "tasks" are extensive and time-consuming, he/she is required to put in an indeterminable number of hours at the workplace. If staying late or coming in early is required to do the job, exempt employees are frequently expected to do just that. This could cut down on the amount of time he/she has for family, friends, or leisure activities, increase stress, and could even lead to occupational burnout.

== Global comparisons ==
Work–life balance has been a controversial issue for workers across the United States for decades. Long work hours are based partly on some business's long operating schedules, while many European countries do not. According to the OECD Better Life Index the United States ranked 28th in work–life balance while European nations dominate this category.

Countries adopt welfare state, which determines the role the government takes to preserve the well being of the citizen. The United States developed a limited welfare state in 1930.

Denmark, Sweden and Norway are ranked in the top 10 countries with the best work–life balance and have all adopted the social-democratic welfare state regime. This system promotes many appealing benefits for single men, women and families. In Denmark new parents are guaranteed 52 weeks of paid leave and universal childcare facilities. Sweden also has an attractive parental leave insuring workers 480 days of paid parental leave. For the Swedish long work hours have been replaced with 6-hour workdays with 1% of the population working more than 50 hours a week.

Other countries like Spain, Germany and the Netherlands are leading in successful work–life balance by adopting the Mediterranean and Conservative Regimes. Within this welfare state there's a focus on traditional family values and gender norm. According to Dr. Deirdre Anderson of Cranfield School of Management "women's place in the labor market is fairly low" compared to the United States, which allows time for family and additional source of income. In Spain gender norms have created the availability of part-time jobs that are typically "employed" by women. The Netherlands follows the same approach on part-time employment as Spain and has "more than half of the working population work part time". Another benefit of work–life balance within this welfare state is the approach on vacation days. Germans are required by law to have 20 paid days off a year and their Dutch counterparts also are insured 20 vacation days.

The common factor between the nations that have prosperous work–life balance is flexible working hours, parental leave and child care policies.

== Gender and work–life balance ==
A study conducted in 2009 concluded that 39% of working women and 45% of working men experience issues with work–life balance.

Full-time male employees worked an average of 8.4 hours per day in 2014, compared with the 7.8 hours worked by women. But nearly 8 million more women than men worked part-time last year. 2013 and 2014 states that 57 percent of women participated in the labor force. Since 1975, the rate of working mothers has risen from 47.4 percent to 70.3 percent.

Women became more prominent in the professional workforce during the 1970s even after getting married and having children. Today women make up 47 percent of the labor force, compared to 38 percent in 1970. Mothers entering the workforce was a shift in traditional values for women and mothers, however in the 2010s, 70% of high school students surveyed believed that mothers could have a healthy relationship with their mother, as opposed to 53% in the 1970s.

Studies show the paid family leave and paid sick days are the issues women care about over any other work–life policy issue. In a poll conducted in November 2008, 35% of women felt that issues in work–life balance for women would be best addressed through paid family leave and sick days. Both genders actually feel that these concerns better address work–life balance with growing concerns of watching children, older family members, and ill family members. The United States is the only high-income country that does not guarantee the right to paid maternity leave.

Studies show increasing paid leave and flexibility at work:

- Benefits companies
- Increases productivity
- Helps recruit more talented workers
- Lowers worker turnover and replacement costs
- Reduces absenteeism
- Boosts profits and cuts costs
- Benefits shareholders: lifts a company's stock price when announced, and shares outperform over the long-term
- Benefits workers: improves job satisfaction and alleviates challenges affecting work-family balance

== Gender and intersectional differences ==
Based on research, there are significant gender differences on work-life balance in the United States. Women perform a bigger share of household chores and taking care of children compared to men, even when both partners are employed full-time. This causes higher levels of conflict because of the uneven division of labor and it makes it more difficult for women to maintain work-life balance.

These differences are a result of gender roles and expectations about caregiving and employment. Even though men being involved in caregiving has increased in recent years, women are still likely to be seen as the main caregivers and they experience more conflict between work and family responsibilities than men do.

Other studies also examine how remote work and changes in the workplace structure can affect work-life balance. Some of the research also found that women are more likely than men to adjust their work schedules or locations to take care of children and other family members, which then causes more inequalities.

Differences between men and women can be influenced by workplace policies. For example, flexible working hours or the option of remote work can help reduce work-family conflict but these options are not available to everyone and are also dependent on work arrangements, occupations, and income.

Although, issues with work-life balance are usually discussed in relation to gender and the different challenges that men and women face, other social aspects like race, ethnicity, and culture are also factors. Cultural, economical, and environment factors influence how people may organize time for work and family. Research on cross-culture suggests that these factors affect how work-life balance is experienced in different contexts.

== See also ==
- Labor rights
- Labor unions in the United States
- Mompreneur
- Public holidays in the United States
- United States labor law
- Work–life interface
