= Audrey Kobayashi =

Canadian geography professor and author

Professor Audrey Kobayashi FRSC
- Born: 1951 (age 74–75); British Columbia, Canada
- Occupations: Professor, author

Academic background
- Education: Ph. D
- Alma mater: University of California at Los Angeles (UCLA)

Academic work
- Discipline: Geography
- Sub-discipline: Racial and gender studies
- Institutions: Queen's University
- Doctoral students: Katie Pickles

Audrey Lynn Kobayashi FRSC (born 1951 in British Columbia) is a Canadian professor and author, specializing in geography, geopolitics, and racial and gender studies. She was the vice-president of the Canadian Association of Geographers from 1999 to 2000, and the president from 2000 to 2002. Kobayashi was also the vice-president of the American Association of Geographers in 2010, and president in 2011.

Kobayashi is currently a professor in the Department of Geography, and a Queen's Research Chair, at Queen's University.

== Education ==
Kobayashi earned her Bachelor of Arts in Geography at the University of British Columbia in 1976. Two years later, she received her Master of Arts at the same university.

In 1983, after assisting in research at the Department of Geography at Kyoto University, she earned her Ph. D in Geography at the University of California at Los Angeles.

== Works ==
From 2002 to 2010, Kobayashi edited the People, Place, and Region section of the Annals of the American Association of Geographers, a bimonthly collection of journals from the association.

In 2012, Kobayashi wrote "Neoclassical urban theory and the study of racism in geography", which was published in Urban Geography in 2014.

In 2014, Kobayashi co-wrote "Colonizing Colonized: Sartre and Fanon" with Mark Boyle.

From 2013 to 2016, Kobayashi was a general editor for the human geography section of The International Encyclopedia of Human Geography.

She co-wrote two major books in 2017. The first being The Equity Myth: Racialization and Indigeneity at Canadian Universities with Carl James, Dua Enakshi, Frances Henry, Howard Ramos, Malinda Sharon Smith, and Peter Li. The second is Continuity and Innovation: Canadian Families in the New Millennium with Amber Gazso.

== Awards ==
In 1995, Koyabashi won the national award of merit from the National Association of Japanese Canadians.

In 1997, Kobayashi won the W.J. Barnes Award for Teaching Excellence for the Arts and Science Undergraduate Society at Queen's University.

She has earned numerous awards from the American Association of Geographers including, the James Blaut Award in 2008, the Lifetime Achievement Award in 2009, and the Presidential Award in 2016.

In September 2011, Kobayashi was inducted into the Royal Society of Canada.
