= Angela Wanhalla =

Professor of history in New Zealand

Angela Wanhalla FRSNZ
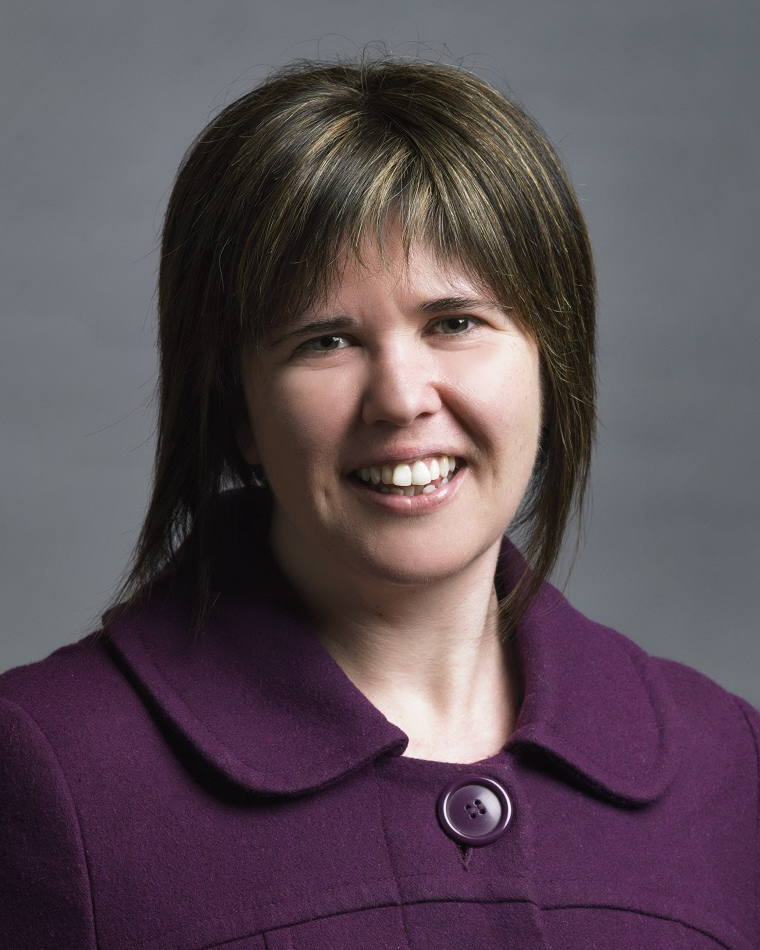
- Wanhalla in 2009

Academic background
- Education: University of Canterbury
- Thesis: Transgressing Boundaries: A History of the Mixed Descent Families of Maitapapa, Taieri, 1830–1940 (2004)
- Doctoral advisor: Katie Pickles

Angela Cheryl Wanhalla FRSNZ is a professor of history at the University of Otago in New Zealand. Her book about interracial marriage in New Zealand won the 2014 Ernest Scott Prize. Wanhalla was elected as a Fellow of the Royal Society Te Apārangi in 2022.

== Academic career ==
Wanhalla is of Māori descent, and affiliates to the Kāi Te Ruahikihiki hapū of Kāi Tahu. She grew up in Rolleston, and was educated at the University of Canterbury, completing a Bachelor's degree with honours in 1999, followed by a Master's degree in 2001, titled Gender, race and colonial identity : women and eugenics in New Zealand, 1918–1939. Her PhD thesis was completed in 2004, and was on the history of mixed descent families of Maitapapa from 1830 to 1940. After her PhD she was a post-doctoral fellow at the University of Saskatchewan, where she held a Canada Research Chair in native–newcomer relations.

Wanhalla was appointed a lecturer in history at the University of Otago in 2005, and rose to become a full professor there in February 2022.

Wanhalla's work focuses on gender and colonialism, and particularly the 'cross-cultural intimacy' of colonial and Indigenous societies in New Zealand and the Pacific. She investigated the relationships of US servicemen with Māori and Pasifika women in New Zealand as part of the Marsden project Mother's Darlings, led by Judith Bennett. She is co-leader of the Marsden-funded project Te Hau Kāinga: Histories and Legacies of the Māori Home Front, 1939–45. Wanhalla has been a judge on the non-fiction panel of the Ockham New Zealand Book Awards, is on the editorial boards of Australian Historical Studies and the Journal of Pacific History, and is a co-editor of the New Zealand Journal of History.

== Awards ==
Wanhalla was awarded the Rowheath Trust Award and the Carl Smith Medal in 2008, followed by an Early Career Research Award at the University of Otago in 2009.

In 2014, Wanhalla was awarded a Royal Society Te Apārangi Rutherford Fellowship, worth $800,000, for a project titled Marriage: The Politics of Private Life in New Zealand. Her 2013 book Matters of the Heart: A History of Interracial Marriage in New Zealand won the 2014 Ernest Scott Prize, which is awarded annually for the most distinguished contribution to the history of Australia or New Zealand. The judges described the book as "a ground-breaking study of interracial relationships". Australian historian Ann McGrath wrote that "its particular achievement is that Wanhalla has carved a space for the history of intermarriage as a new genre of national history."

In 2020, Wanhalla was named the Otago University Students' Association Supervisor of the Year. Wanhalla said "I love working with postgraduate students. It’s one of the best things about this job."

Wanhalla was elected a Fellow of the Royal Society Te Apārangi in 2022. Her nomination stated she "has successfully broadened understanding of how intimate relations, inclusive of affectionate bonds, sexual violence, and the emotional legacies of global war in indigenous societies, are deeply entwined with colonial policy and practice. She has approached these histories in award-winning innovative ways, combining archival research with visual and material culture and oral histories to tell new histories of New Zealand's colonial past from the perspectives of indigenous women and their communities".

== Selected publications ==
- Wanhalla, Angela Cheryl (2009). In/visible Sight: The Mixed-Descent Families of Southern New Zealand. Wellington: Bridget Williams Books. doi:10.7810/9781877242434. ISBN 978-1-877242-43-4. LCCN 2009286157. OCLC 475614740. OL 24104193M. Wikidata Q115249693.
- Wanhalla, Angela Cheryl; Erika Wolf (2011). Early New Zealand photography: images and essays. Dunedin: Otago University Press. ISBN 978-1-877578-16-8. LCCN 2012471785. OCLC 767566414. OL 25966782M. Wikidata Q115249686.
- Wanhalla, Angela Cheryl (2013). Matters of the heart : a history of interracial marriage in New Zealand. Auckland: Auckland University Press. ISBN 978-1-86940-731-5. OCLC 847842957. Wikidata Q115249726.
- Wanhalla, Angela Cheryl; Bennett, Judith Ann (2016). Mothers' Darlings of the South Pacific: The Children of Indigenous Women and U.S. Servicemen, World War II. Honolulu: University of Hawaiʻi Press. ISBN 978-0-8248-5829-2. OCLC 1091462949. OL 29339668M. Wikidata Q115249692.
- Paterson, Lachlan; Wanhalla, Angela Cheryl (2017). He Reo Wāhine: Māori women's voices from the nineteenth century (in English and Māori). Auckland: Auckland University Press. ISBN 978-1-86940-866-4. LCCN 2017434636. OCLC 993615826. OL 40450692M. Wikidata Q113686173.
