= UTC Reading =

Coordinates: 51°26′52″N 0°56′23″W

Location
- Crescent Road; Reading, Berkshire, RG1 5RQ; England

Information
- Type: University Technical College
- Motto: Transforming Lives Through Learning
- Established: 2013
- Department for Education URN: 139268 Tables
- Ofsted: Reports
- Headteacher: Jennie Thomson
- Staff: 50 approx
- Gender: Mixed
- Age: 14 to 18
- Enrolment: 490 approx
- Website: http://www.utcreading.co.uk/

UTC Reading is an Ofsted 'Good' rated university technical college (UTC) that opened in Reading, Berkshire, England in September 2013. The University of Reading, Reading College and Oxford and Cherwell Valley College are the lead education sponsors of the UTC, while business partners include Agilent Technologies, CGI Group, Cisco Systems, Microsoft, Peter Brett Associates LLP and Network Rail. In 2025, Ofsted marked the school and sixth form as "Good" in all categories.

== Admissions ==
UTC Reading has an annual initial intake of students aged 14 and 16 (academic years 10 and 12). The primary catchment area of the UTC includes Reading, Wokingham, West Berkshire, South Oxfordshire, Basingstoke & Deane, Bracknell Forest, Windsor & Maidenhead, Wycombe and Hart. Where the number of applications for admission to the UTC is greater than the number of places, a set percentage of places are allocated for students living in each part of the catchment area.

== Curriculum ==
UTC Reading specialises in computer science and engineering. Pupils aged 14 to 16 study a core number of GCSEs and also choose a BTEC First Extended Certificate in either engineering or ICT. Sixth form students choose between the specialisms and then take a programme of related study which can include A Levels, BTECs and GCSEs.

== Co-Curricular ==
UTC Reading established a Combined Cadet Force (RAF section) in January 2019, which has become very active. The UTC has good links to the British Army (REME) and Royal Navy, taking part in a number of Service challenges each year including the Royal Navy's annual Junior Field Gun Challenge. The UTC is active with F1 in Schools, Greenpower and has a number of STEM clubs such as a "Drones Club". UTC pupils have had some success in the local TeenTech competition.

The UTC previously operated the now defunct student run online radio station, UTCR.Live. This provided students with leadership experience as well as usage of industry standard equipment.

The UTC also strengthens its co-curricular activities by collaborating with local branches of some of the Professional Engineering Institutions (PEIs), most notable the Institution of Engineering and Technology, the Institution of Civil Engineers, the Institution of Mechanical Engineers and the Royal Aeronautical Society.
