= Sheelagh Matear =

New Zealand marketing professor

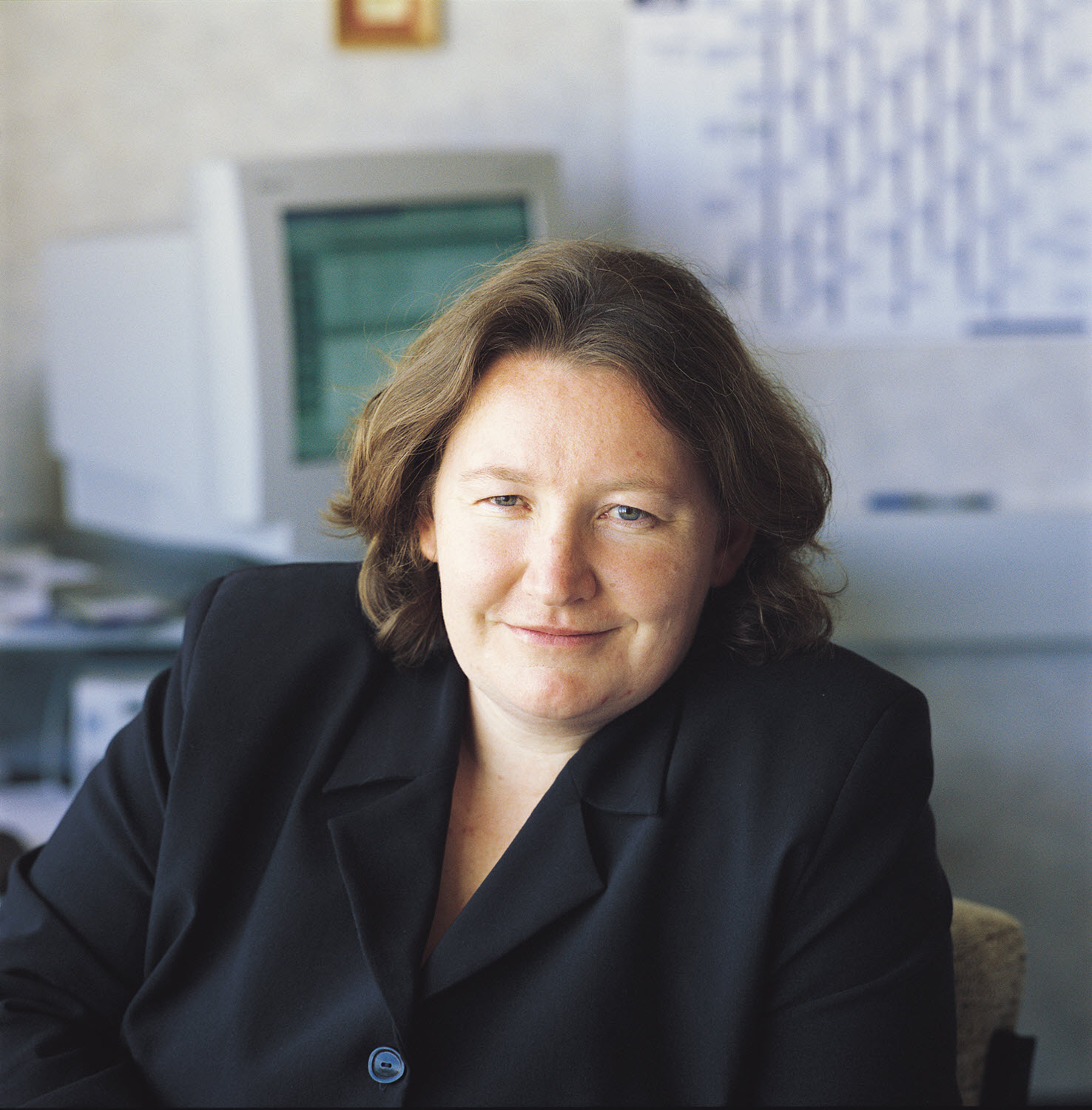

Academic background
- Education: University of Plymouth, University of Plymouth, University of Plymouth
- Thesis: The Existence and Use of Benefit Segments in the Irish Sea Ferry Market (1991)

Academic work
- Institutions: University of Arizona, University of Otago, Lincoln University, Academic Quality Agency for New Zealand Universities
- Doctoral students: Jodyanne Kirkwood

Sheelagh Maureen Matear is a New Zealand academic, and is emeritus professor at Lincoln University. She was the Executive Director of the Academic Quality Agency for New Zealand Universities for eight years until retiring in 2024.

== Academic career ==
Matear completed a PhD titled The Existence and Use of Benefit Segments in the Irish Sea Ferry Market at the University of Plymouth. Matear worked at the University of Arizona and at the University of Plymouth. She joined the University of Otago as a senior lecturer in 1994, and was appointed associate professor in 2001. Matear was Head of the Department of Marketing at Otago from 2001 until 2004, when she moved to Lincoln University. One of Matear's notable doctoral students while at Otago was Professor Jodyanne Kirkwood. While at Lincoln Matear was Deputy Vice-Chancellor, Academic Quality and Student Experience. She was also a member of the Committee on Academic Programmes.

She was appointed an emeritus professor at Lincoln in 2016. In 2016 Matear was appointed as Executive Director of the AQA, the Academic Quality Agency for New Zealand Universities (previously known as the New Zealand Universities Academic Audit Unit), replacing Jan Cameron. She was responsible for conducting the Cycle 6 of the academic audits of New Zealand universities, and introduced student members to the auditing teams. Matear retired from her role at AQA in June 2024, a move which she delayed in order to coincide with the winding up of AQA by the end of 2024.

Matear was also a non-local member of the council for the Hong Kong Council for Accreditation of Academic and Vocational Qualifications.

== Selected works ==
- Bjørn Stensaker; Matear, Sheelagh Maureen (2024). "Student involvement in quality assurance: perspectives and practices towards persistent partnerships". Quality in Higher Education: 1–15. doi:10.1080/13538322.2024.2346358. Wikidata Q130300497.
- Matear, Sheelagh Maureen (2021). "Impact of institutional quality audit in the Aotearoa New Zealand university system". Quality in Higher Education. 27 (3): 375–391. doi:10.1080/13538322.2021.1948675. Wikidata Q130300498.
- Roger Baxter; Matear, Sheelagh Maureen (2004). "Measuring intangible value in business-to-business buyer–seller relationships: An intellectual capital perspective". Industrial Marketing Management. 33 (6): 491–500. doi:10.1016/j.indmarman.2004.01.008. Wikidata Q130300499.
- Gray, Brendan James; Matear, Sheelagh Maureen; Philip K. Matheson (2000). "Improving the performance of hospitality firms". International Journal of Contemporary Hospitality Management. 12 (3): 149–155. doi:10.1108/09596110010320643. Wikidata Q107457951.
- Caroline Giller; Matear, Sheelagh Maureen (2001). "The termination of inter‐firm relationships". Journal of Business and Industrial Marketing. 16 (2): 94–112. doi:10.1108/08858620110384132. Wikidata Q130300565.
- Gray, Brendan James; Matear, Sheelagh Maureen; Philip K. Matheson (2002). "Improving service firm performance". Journal of Services Marketing. 16 (3): 186–200. doi:10.1108/08876040210427191. Wikidata Q130300557.
- Matear, Sheelagh Maureen; Gray, Brendan James; Tony Garrett (2004). "Market orientation, brand investment, new service development, market position and performance for service organisations". Journal of Service Management. 15 (3): 284–301. doi:10.1108/09564230410540944. Wikidata Q130300555.
