= Janet Stephenson =

New Zealand social scientist

- Born: 1955

Academic background
- Education: University of Otago, Massey University
- Theses: The planning framework for Maori land (2000); Values in space and time: A framework for understanding and linking multiple cultural values in landscapes (2005)
- Doctoral advisor: Claire Freeman, Ian Smith, Michael Patrick Joseph Reilly

Janet Rhona Stephenson (born 1955) is a New Zealand social scientist who is a research professor at the University of Otago, where she is director of the Centre for Sustainability. Her research focuses on climate change and societal transition.

== Academic career ==
Stephenson's father was environmentalist farmer Gordon Stephenson, founder of the QEII National Trust. The family moved to New Zealand from the United Kingdom in 1958 when Janet Stephenson was a young child. Stephenson completed a master's thesis titled The planning framework for Maori land at Massey University. She followed this with a PhD at the University of Otago in 2005, studying cultural values and the links between society, values and sustainability outcomes. From 2002 Stephenson taught in the geography department at Otago, before joining the Centre for Sustainability in 2008. She has been director of the Centre for Sustainability since 2011. Stephenson was appointed associate professor in 2018 and research professor in 2021.

Stephenson has been a member of the advisory board of INCLUDE, a Norwegian research centre for socially inclusive energy transitions. She is also involved in the Built Environment and Active Transport to School research programme, the Building Research Association of New Zealand Transition to Zero Carbon Programme, the Coastal People: Southern Skies Centre of Research Excellence, the Deep South National Science Challenge, and the Science for Technological Innovation science challenge.

Stephenson's research focuses on climate change, and how to achieve societal transition to a sustainable future. She works in multidisciplinary teams, and has developed cultural frameworks as a new theoretical way to explore societal change. She has commented on issues such as New Zealand's electricity infrastructure, and how the economy could be redesigned.

Stephenson has received research funding from the Ministry of Business, Innovation and Employment's Endeavour fund and the Norwegian Research Council, and was a principal investigator on a Marsden grant-funded project in 2008, with Henrik Moller and others, titled Tirohia He Huarahi: Co-management of environment by indigenous people.

== Selected works ==
=== Edited and authored books ===
- Stephenson, Janet; Abbott, Mick; Ruru, Jacinta, eds. (2010). Landscape and identity in Aotearoa New Zealand. University of Otago Press. ISBN 978-1-877372-81-0.
- Stephenson, Janet (2023). Culture and Sustainability: Exploring Stability and Transformation with the Cultures Framework. Palgrave Macmillan Cham. ISBN 978-3-031-25515-1.
- Ruru, Jacinta; Stephenson, Janet; Abbott, Mick, eds. (2013). Exploring land-use tensions in Aotearoa New Zealand. University of Otago Press. ISBN 978-1-877372-88-9.

=== Journal articles ===
- Stephenson, Janet (2008). "The Cultural Values Model: An integrated approach to values in landscapes". Landscape and Urban Planning. 84 (2): 127–139. doi:10.1016/j.landurbplan.2007.07.003. Wikidata Q125820041.
- Stephenson, Janet; Henrik Moller (2009). "Cross‐cultural environmental research and management: Challenges and progress". Journal of the Royal Society of New Zealand. 39 (4): 139–149. doi:10.1080/03014220909510567. Wikidata Q125820038.
- Jessica B. Graham; Stephenson, Janet; Smith, Inga Jane (2009). "Public perceptions of wind energy developments: Case studies from New Zealand". Energy Policy. 37 (9): 3348–3357. doi:10.1016/j.enpol.2008.12.035. Wikidata Q125820039.
- Stephenson, Janet; Barton, Barry; Carrington, Gerald; Adam Doering; Ford, Rebecca; Hopkins, Debbie Deborah Mary; Lawson, Rob; Alaric McCarthy; David Rees; Michelle Scott; Paul Thorsnes; Sara Walton; John Williams; Ben Wooliscroft (2015). "The energy cultures framework: Exploring the role of norms, practices and material culture in shaping energy behaviour in New Zealand". Energy Research & Social Science. 7: 117–123. doi:10.1016/j.erss.2015.03.005. Wikidata Q58213225.
- Turner, Nancy; Berkes, Fikret; Stephenson, Janet; Jonathan Dick (2013). "Blundering Intruders: Extraneous Impacts on Two Indigenous Food Systems". Human ecology. 41 (4): 563–574. doi:10.1007/s10745-013-9591-y. Wikidata Q108531236.
- Stephenson, Janet; Barry Barton; Carrington, Gerald; Gnoth, Daniel; Lawson, Rob; Paul Thorsnes (2010). "Energy cultures: A framework for understanding energy behaviours". Energy Policy. 38 (10): 6120–6129. doi:10.1016/j.enpol.2010.05.069. Wikidata Q125820040.
