= Janice Lord =

New Zealand botanist and plant evolutionary biologist

- Born: Janice Marjorie Lord
- Education: University of Canterbury
- Known for: Curator of the Otago Regional Herbarium
- Awards: Leonard Cockayne Memorial Lecture award (2015)
- Scientific career
- Fields: Plant evolutionary ecology, reproduction and pollination biology
- Workplaces: University of Otago
- Thesis: The evolutionary ecology of Festuca novae-zelandiae in Mid-Canterbury, New Zealand (1992)

Janice Marjorie Lord is a New Zealand academic, a plant evolutionary biologist, and as of 2025 is a full professor at the University of Otago, where she is the curator of the Otago Regional Herbarium.

== Academic career ==
After a PhD titled The evolutionary ecology of Festuca novae-zelandiae in mid-Canterbury, New Zealand, submitted to the University of Canterbury in 1992, Lord moved to the Department of Botany at the University of Otago, where she became an associate professor in 2017 and a full professor in 2025.

Lord's research focuses on how the New Zealand fauna have shaped plant flora through pollination and fruit dispersal systems. She has worked particularly on alpine plant communities, but has also published on subantarctic megaherbs, and the use of traditional knowledge of native plants in botany. She is also interested in mycorrhizal flora for ecological restoration, and carbon sequestration by native plants. She is a principal investigator for the 1 Billion Trees project, and is part of the Otago Climate Change Network.

Lord received the Leonard Cockayne Lecture Award in 2015; she was only the second female recipient after Lucy Moore won the first award in 1965. Lord gave her lectures on subantarctic flora.

In 2017, Lord featured as one of the Royal Society Te Apārangi's 150 women in 150 words, celebrating the contributions of women to knowledge in New Zealand.

== Selected works ==
- S. Walton; Janice Lord; A. J. Lord; V. Kahui (20 June 2023). "Conflicts between being a "Good Farmer" and freshwater policy: A New Zealand case study". Agriculture and Human Values. doi:10.1007/s10460-023-10471-1. ISSN 0889-048X. Wikidata Q121432307.
- Janice Lord; David Norton (June 1990). "Scale and the Spatial Concept of Fragmentation". Conservation Biology. 4 (2): 197–202. doi:10.1111/j.1523-1739.1990.tb00109.x. ISSN 0888-8892. Wikidata Q63601674.
- Janice Lord; Mark Westoby; Michelle Leishman (September 1995). "Seed Size and Phylogeny in Six Temperate Floras: Constraints, Niche Conservatism, and Adaptation". The American Naturalist. 146 (3): 349–364. doi:10.1086/285804. ISSN 0003-0147. Wikidata Q57046510.
- Diane R Campbell; M Bischoff; Janice Lord; Alastair W. Robertson (8 December 2011). "Where have all the blue flowers gone: pollinator responses and selection on flower colour in New Zealand Wahlenbergia albomarginata". Journal of Evolutionary Biology. 25 (2): 352–364. doi:10.1111/j.1420-9101.2011.02430.x. ISSN 1010-061X. PMID 22151952. Wikidata Q38435639.
- J. M. Lord; A. S. Markey; J. Marshall, Have frugivores influenced the evolution of fruit traits in New Zealand?, pp. 55–68, doi:10.1079/9780851995250.0055, Wikidata Q63601510
- Janice Lord; Judy Egan; Trevor Clifford; Enrique Jurado; Michelle Leishman; Dick Williams; Mark Westoby (January 1997). "Larger seeds in tropical floras: consistent patterns independent of growth form and dispersal mode". Journal of Biogeography. 24 (2): 205–211. doi:10.1046/j.1365-2699.1997.00126.x. ISSN 0305-0270. Wikidata Q57046499.
- Janice Lord (August 2004). "Frugivore gape size and the evolution of fruit size and shape in southern hemisphere floras". Austral Ecology. 29 (4): 430–436. doi:10.1111/j.1442-9993.2004.01382.x. ISSN 1442-9985. Wikidata Q63601496.
