= Reading College =

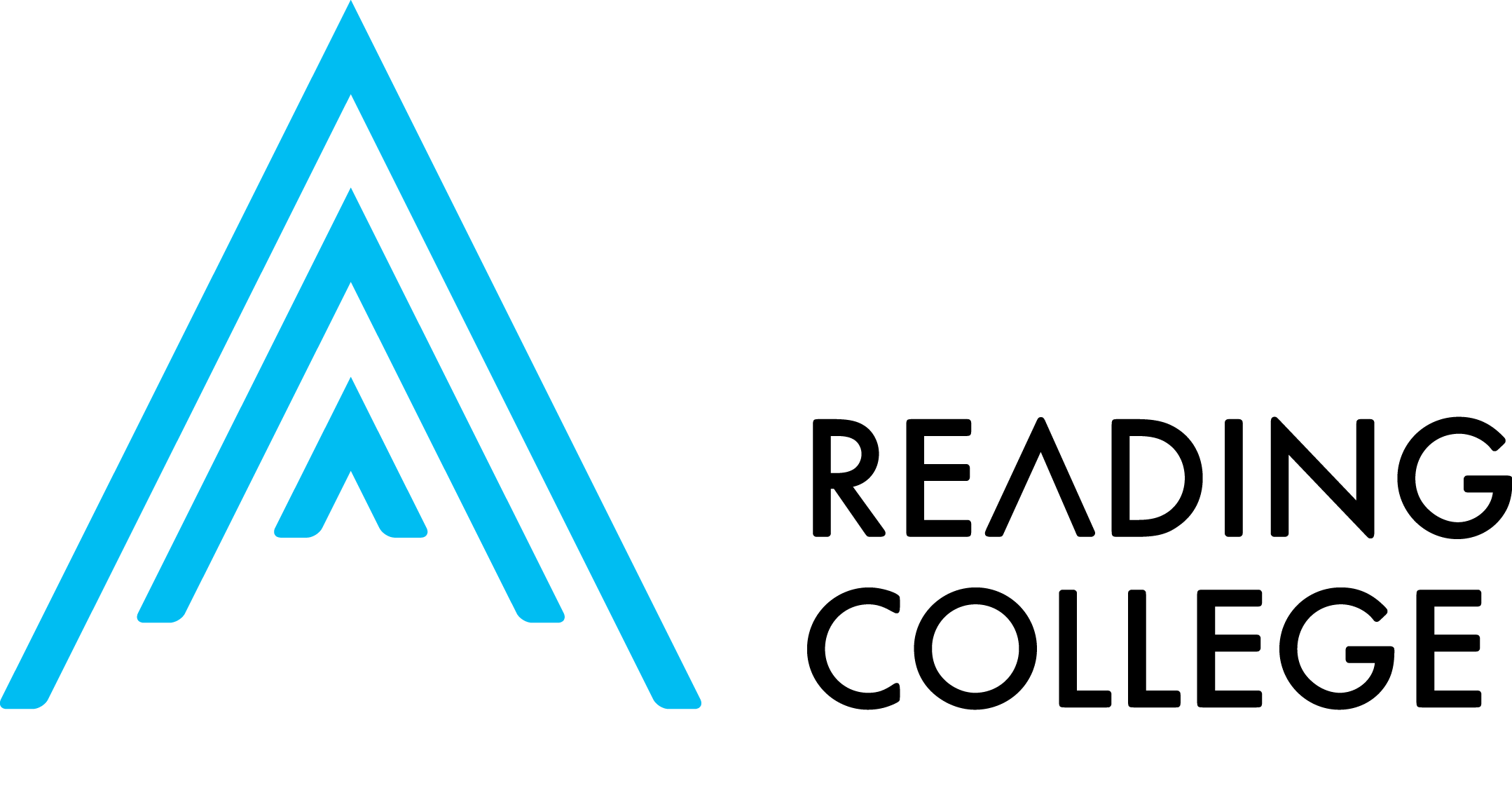

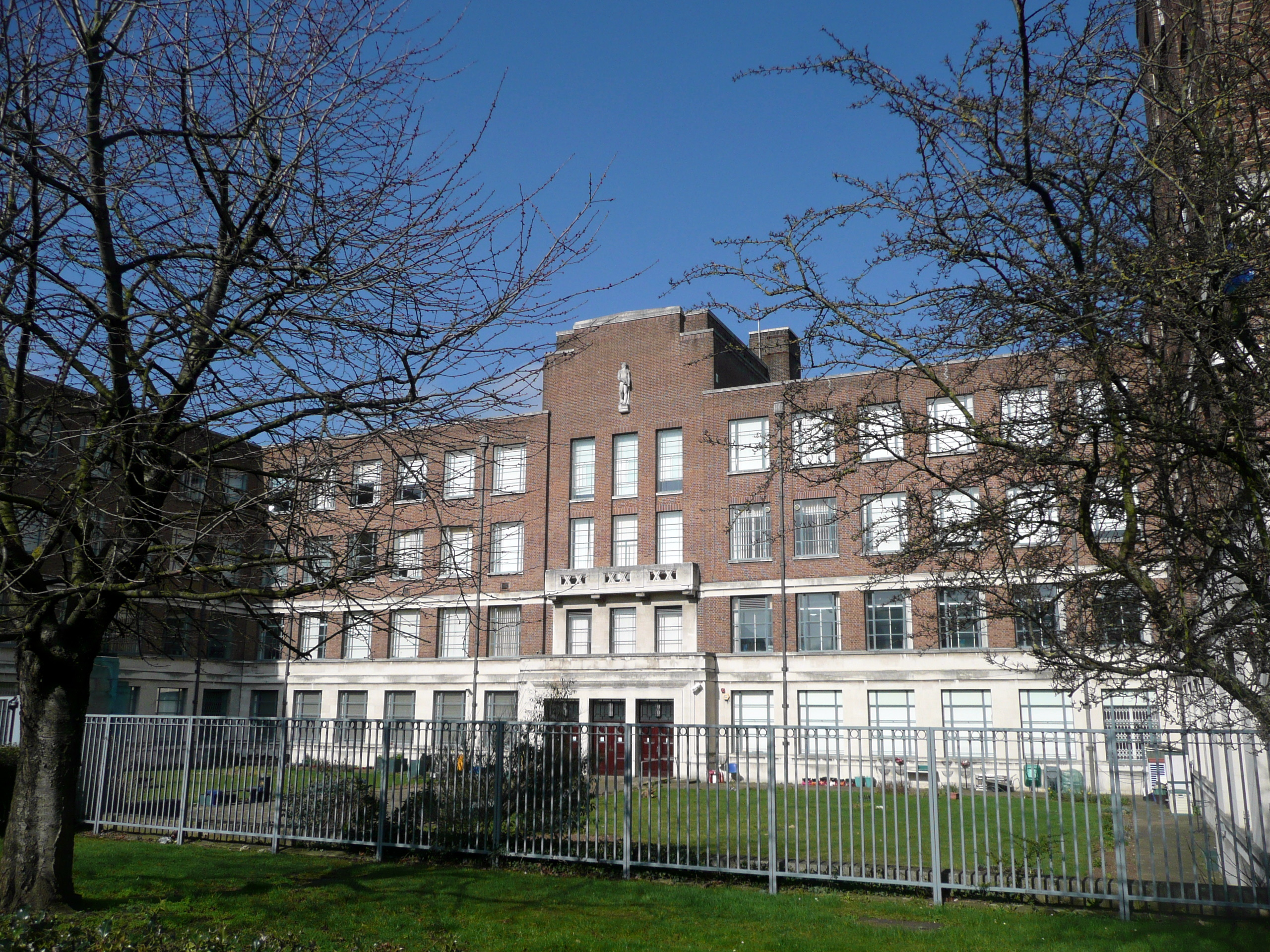
- Original main building designed by Lanchester & Lodge, built between 1950-55

Location
- Kings Road; Reading, Berkshire, RG1 4HJ; England; 51°27′14″N 0°57′17″W

Information
- Type: Further education
- Motto: Our Learners go further
- Established: 2010; 16 years ago
- Local authority: Reading
- Principal: Paul Newman
- Gender: all
- Website: www.reading-college.ac.uk

Reading College is a further education college based in Reading, Berkshire, England. It has over 8,500 local learners on over 900 courses.

== History ==
The Kings Road site that is the principal location of Reading College has been used for further education since 1955, when the Reading Technical College was opened. This was renamed the Reading College of Technology in 1967 and the Reading College of Arts and Technology during the 1970s. Thanks to a merger with the Berkshire College of Art and Design (in Maidenhead), it became the Reading College and School of Arts and Design in 1997. It was taken over and became part of Thames Valley University in 2004. Thames Valley University continued to offer further education courses at the site, whilst also offering higher education courses more in keeping with its status as a university.. In 1986/87 the college football team won the Berkshire County Cup.

In 2009, the Thames Valley University decided to concentrate on higher education. In 2010 the responsibility for further education, along with the Kings Road site, were transferred to a relaunched Reading College. The college is a partnership between Activate Learning, (an educational group working alongside City of Oxford College and Banbury and Bicester College) and the Learning and Skills Network (LSN), a not-for-profit organisation active in education and training.

Reading College and Activate Learning are lead sponsors of UTC Reading, a university technical college which opened in September 2013.

== November 2025 stabbing ==
At approximately 14:20 on the afternoon of 6 November 2025, a male student at the college was stabbed and was admitted to hospital, although not much is known about the attack, the injuries were non-fatal. The college was placed on lockdown, as large numbers of police units surrounded the building. Two arrests were made.
