= City of Oxford College =

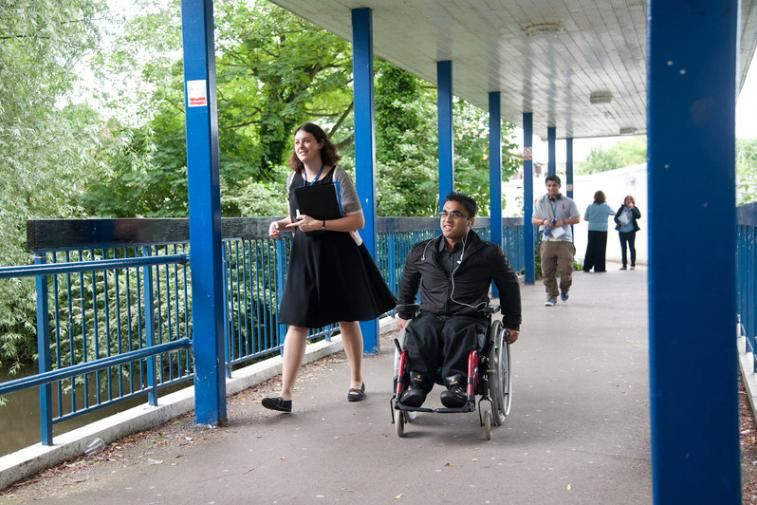

Location
- Oxpens Road; Oxford, Oxfordshire, OX1 1SA; England
- 51.74955°N 1.26451°W

Information
- Type: Further Education College
- Department for Education URN: 134153 Tables
- Gender: Coeducational
- Website: www.cityofoxford.ac.uk

City of Oxford College is a further education college in Oxford, England. It has two campuses: the City Centre campus in Oxford city centre, and the Technology Campus in Blackbird Leys, south-east of Oxford city.

== Introduction ==
It used to be called Oxford and Cherwell Valley College (OCVC) but changed its name in 2013 when the Oxford and Cherwell Valley College Group restructured and became Activate Learning Group.

Programmes at the City of Oxford College include vocational training for school leavers and professionals/adults, A Levels, apprenticeships, higher education, international study, leisure and adult learning, and programmes to help unemployed people return to work.

== History ==
1.1 Oxford College of Further Education

Founded in 1960 and based at the current Blackbird Leys and Oxford City Centre campuses, the Oxford College of Further Education offered courses to students at all levels.

At the turn of the millennium, the student population was made up of 1,872 full-time and 7,533 part-time students. The college was divided into three faculties: arts, engineering services, and business and technology.

1.2 Oxford and Cherwell College

On 31 July 2003, Oxford College of Further Education merged with North Oxfordshire College in Banbury to become Oxford and Cherwell College.

The newly-merged college also became home to the Rycotewood Furniture Centre, which moved from Thame, where it belonged to Rycotewood College, to the Oxford City Centre campus. Rycotewood College was founded through a philanthropic grant by Cecil Michaelis in the 1930s.

1.3 Oxford & Cherwell Valley College

A new campus was opened in Bicester in 2005. This is when the college became Oxford & Cherwell Valley College (OCVC). In 2010, OCVC, along with the Learning Skills Network (LSN), took responsibility for running Reading College. OCVC then became the Oxford & Cherwell Valley College Group.

1.4 City of Oxford College

In 2013, the OCVC Group reorganised and restructured and became Activate Learning. The two OCVC colleges (Oxford and Banbury) changed their names to City of Oxford College and Banbury and Bicester College.

== Subjects and courses ==
2.1 Full-time study

Subjects available for full-time study at City of Oxford College include art and design, brickwork, business and enterprise, caring and health, catering and hospitality, construction, electrical, engineering, foundation studies, furniture, hair and beauty, joinery, media, motor vehicles, music, painting and decorating, performing arts, plumbing, sport, travel and tourism, and uniformed public services.

Construction (and related), electrical, motor vehicle, and ICT are taught at the City of Oxford Technology Campus in Blackbird Leys.

2.2 A-levels

The sixth-form centre at City of Oxford College offers more than 10 A-level subjects.

2.3 Higher education

Higher education (HE) is delivered across the Activate Learning group. Different HE programmes are delivered at the different colleges.

The group delivers higher education (university-level) programmes in art and design, business, care, computing, engineering, furniture, motorsports, policing, and sports coaching. These programs include HNDs, foundation degrees, and honours degrees.

The group also delivers the PGCE teaching and training qualification.

The foundation degree (Level 5) and honours degree (Level 6) programmes are delivered in partnership with local universities.

2.4 International students

There are many international students at City of Oxford College. Activate Learning runs an international study program for students from overseas.

The City of Oxford College shares buildings with the French Business School, EM Normandie.

2.5 Part-time study

Part-time study can be professional (qualification-based) or leisure (non-qualification-based). Part-time subjects with qualifications include accounting, business, catering, hair and beauty, ICT, first aid, teaching and training, security, sport, and skills for life.

Subjects without qualifications focus mostly on the creative arts (e.g., art, photography, textiles, ceramics) and woodworking.

2.6 Apprenticeships and work-based training

The City of Oxford College provides apprenticeship training across many of its vocational subjects. These are delivered by Activate Apprenticeships, the group’s business-to-business service.

2.7 Courses for the Unemployed

The college has a Get That Job programme for people who are unemployed. It provides free training courses to those who are eligible and offers help with skills such as CV writing and interview techniques.

== Campuses ==
The City of Oxford College has campuses, one in Oxford City Centre and one in Blackbird Leys.

3.1 City of Oxford College City Centre campus

The campus has on-site facilities for students to do their training. These include furniture workshops, hair and beauty salons, a restaurant, and studios for music, performing arts, and creative media. The salons and restaurants are open to customers.

Rycotewood Furniture Centre is a specialist centre located on campus.

3.2 City of Oxford College Technology Campus, Blackbird Leys

Blackbird Leys is an Oxford ward to the south-east of the city centre. The campus delivers courses in construction (carpentry, joinery, plumbing, brickwork, and painting and decorating), motor vehicles, and electrical installation.

== Specialist Centres ==
4.1 National School of Furniture

The National School of Furniture (NSF) is a partnership between Rycotewood Furniture Centre and Bucks New University. The partnership was formed in 2010 to offer furniture training from Level 1 (certificate) through Level 8 (PhD). Rycotewood Furniture Centre, on the City of Oxford City Centre campus, offers training provision from Level 1 to Level 6, which is a BA Honours degree (top-up).

Rycotewood is an established name in the furniture industry. Rycotewood College was set up in 1938 in Thame, Oxfordshire, to deliver training in furniture and engineering.

In 2003, the furniture department moved to the college and became the Rycotewood Furniture Centre.
