= Katie Pickles =

New Zealand history academic

Katie Pickles FRSNZ

Academic background
- Education: McGill University
- Thesis: Representing twentieth century Canadian colonial identity : the Imperial Order Daughters of the Empire (IODE) (1996)
- Doctoral advisor: Audrey Kobayashi

Academic work
- Discipline: Postcolonial and feminist history
- Institutions: University of Canterbury
- Doctoral students: Megan Woods; Angela Wanhalla

Catherine Gillian Pickles FRSNZ is a New Zealand history academic, and as of 2019 is a full professor at the University of Canterbury. In 2025, Pickles was elected a Fellow of the Royal Society Te Apārangi and the United Kingdom's Royal Historical Society.

== Academic career ==
After an undergraduate at the University of Canterbury (where she edited the student paper Canta) and University of British Columbia, Pickles completed a 1996 PhD titled 'Representing twentieth century Canadian colonial identity : the Imperial Order Daughters of the Empire (IODE)' at McGill University. Pickles returned to the University of Canterbury, rising to full professor.

Much of Pickles' work is influenced by postcolonial and feminist approaches.

In March 2025, Pickles was elected a Fellow of the Royal Society Te Apārangi "for being an international leader in feminist history". In July 2025, she was elected a Fellow of the Royal Historical Society in the United Kingdom.

== Selected works ==
- Pickles, Katie. "Female imperialism and national identity." (2018).
- Pickles, Katie. Transnational outrage: The death and commemoration of Edith Cavell. Springer, 2016.
- Rutherdale, Myra, and Katie Pickles, eds. Contact zones: Aboriginal and settler women in Canada's colonial past. UBC Press, 2014.
- Pickles, Katie. "A link in ‘the great chain of Empire friendship’: the Victoria League in New Zealand." The Journal of Imperial and Commonwealth History 33, no. 1 (2005): 29-50.
- Pickles, Katie. "Colonial counterparts: the first academic women in Anglo-Canada, New Zealand and Australia." Women's History Review 10, no. 2 (2001): 273–298.
- Pickles, Katie. "Kiwi Icons and the Re‐Settlement of New Zealand 1 as Colonial Space." New Zealand Geographer 58, no. 2 (2002): 5–16.
