= National Bankers Association =

American trade organization

The National Bankers Association is a U.S. trade organization representing the nation’s minority- and women-owned financial institutions. The organization hosts conferences and works with both government agencies and the private sector to help strengthen and expand the commercial viability of this sector of the U.S. banking industry.

Founded in 1927 as the Negro Bankers Association, it became the National Bankers Association in 1948. It is headquartered in Washington, D.C., and currently represents approximately 100 financial institutions.
