= Sara Walton =

New Zealand management professor

Academic background
- Education: University of Otago
- Theses: Exploring career: A study of career meanings in changing workplaces (2000); Contesting natures : a discourse analysis of natural resource conflicts (2008)

Sara Walton is a New Zealand academic, and is a full professor at the University of Otago, specialising in climate change and business, including topics such as circular economies, business preparedness for climate change, and carbon footprints.

== Academic career ==
Walton completed a Master of Commerce titled Exploring career: A study of career meanings in changing workplaces at the University of Otago. She went on to also complete a PhD at Otago exploring conflicts over natural resources. Walton then joined the faculty of the University of Otago, rising to associate professor in 2019 and full professor in 2023. Walton teaches the Master of Sustainable Business and is the co-director of Otago's Climate Change Research Network.

Walton's research focuses on climate change and business, including topics such as circular economies, business preparedness for climate change, and carbon footprints. Walton led research, with Janice Lord, that investigated farmers' attitudes to the 2020 National Policy Statement for Freshwater Management, finding that farmers saw a tension between complying with the regulations and being a 'good farmer'. She also conducted a stakeholder analysis on land use around the Macraes gold mine, using discourse analysis to investigate the issues that stakeholders had. Walton has conducted research for OceanaGold and BRANZ, and is part of the Innovation Culture team within the Science for Technological Innovation National Science Challenge. Walton helped produce Stuff's Climate Action Report Card.

== Selected works ==
=== Journal articles ===
- Markus J. Milne; Helen Tregidga; Sara Walton (2009). "Words not actions! The ideological role of sustainable development reporting". Accounting. 22 (8): 1211–1257. doi:10.1108/09513570910999292. Wikidata Q126726621.
- Markus J. Milne; Kate Kearins; Sara Walton (2006). "Creating Adventures in Wonderland: The Journey Metaphor and Environmental Sustainability". Organization. 13 (6): 801–839. doi:10.1177/1350508406068506. Wikidata Q53997251.
- Stephenson, Janet; Barton, Barry; Carrington, Gerald; Adam Doering; Ford, Rebecca; Hopkins, Debbie Deborah Mary; Lawson, Rob; Alaric McCarthy; David Rees; Michelle Scott; Paul Thorsnes; Sara Walton; John Williams; Ben Wooliscroft (2015). "The energy cultures framework: Exploring the role of norms, practices and material culture in shaping energy behaviour in New Zealand". Energy Research & Social Science. 7: 117–123. doi:10.1016/j.erss.2015.03.005. Wikidata Q58213225.
- Jodyanne Kirkwood; Sara Walton (2010). "What motivates ecopreneurs to start businesses?". International Journal of Entrepreneurial Behaviour and Research. 16 (3): 204–228. doi:10.1108/13552551011042799. Wikidata Q126726629.
- S. Walton; Lord, Janice Marjorie; A. J. Lord; V. Kahui (2023). "Conflicts between being a "Good Farmer" and freshwater policy: A New Zealand case study". Agriculture and Human Values. doi:10.1007/s10460-023-10471-1. Wikidata Q121432307.
- Ford, Rebecca; Sara Walton; Stephenson, Janet; David Rees; Michelle Scott; Geoff King; Williams, John; Ben Wooliscroft (2017). "Emerging energy transitions: PV uptake beyond subsidies". Technological Forecasting and Social Change. 117: 138–150. doi:10.1016/j.techfore.2016.12.007. Wikidata Q63777328.
- Gray, Brendan James; Suzanne Duncan; Jodyanne Kirkwood; Sara Walton (2014). "Encouraging sustainable entrepreneurship in climate-threatened communities: a Samoan case study". Entrepreneurship and Regional Development. 26 (5–6): 401–430. doi:10.1080/08985626.2014.922622. Wikidata Q126726642.

=== Newspaper articles ===
- "Creating value locally and further afield". Otago Daily Times. 1 June 2020.
- "The best of the radical futures". Otago Daily Times. 22 November 2021.
- "Everyday steps towards resilience". Otago Daily Times. 27 February 2023.
- "Crunching the numbers on carbon". Otago Daily Times. 16 December 2023.
