= Activate Learning =

Location
- Oxpens Road; Oxford, Oxfordshire, OX1 1SA; England
- 51.74955°N 1.26451°W

Information
- Type: Educational services provider
- Local authority: Oxfordshire
- Department for Education URN: 134153 Tables
- Gender: Coeducational

Activate Learning is an education and training group based in Oxford, England. It runs schools, further education colleges and work-based training across Oxfordshire, Berkshire and Surrey, and delivers higher-education and international study programmes as well.

Activate Learning was launched on 4 November 2013 following the reorganisation, restructure and rebranding of the Oxford & Cherwell Valley College (OCVC) Group in 2013.

== History ==
=== Oxford College of Further Education ===
Founded in 1960, and based at the current Blackbird Leys and Oxford city centre campuses, the Oxford College of Further Education offered courses to students at all levels. At one time it also had a small campus on the Cowley Road, which was used for engineering studies.

At the turn of the millennium the student population was made up of 1,872 full-time and 7,533 part-time students. The college was divided into three faculties: arts, engineering services, and business and technology.

=== North Oxfordshire College ===
North Oxfordshire College, in Banbury, was a general further education college that served Banbury and Bicester. At the turn of the millennium, 1,115 full-time students were based at the college. There were also 3,360 part-time students.

=== Oxford and Cherwell College ===
The Oxford and Cherwell College (Incorporation) Order 2003 (UKSI 2003-510)

On 31 July 2003, Oxford College of Further Education and North Oxfordshire College merged to become Oxford and Cherwell College.

The newly merged college also became home to the Rycotewood Furniture Centre, which moved from Thame – where it belonged to Rycotewood College – to the Oxford city centre campus.

=== Oxford & Cherwell Valley College ===
A new campus was opened in Bicester in 2005. This is when the college became Oxford & Cherwell Valley College (OCVC). Reading College and the Oxford & Cherwell Valley College Group. In 2010, OCVC, along with the Learning Skills Network (LSN), took responsibility for running Reading College. OCVC then became the Oxford & Cherwell Valley College Group.

=== Activate Learning ===
In 2013, the OCVC Group reorganised and restructured. The colleges in Banbury and Oxford changed their names to Banbury and Bicester College, and City of Oxford College. They now sit alongside Reading College and Bracknell and Wokingham under the new group structure.

It was created in 2003 as a result of the merger between Oxford College of Further Education, North Oxfordshire College in Banbury and Rycotewood College in Thame. Rycotewood was relocated to Oxford and the college changed to its current name in 2005 due to the new opening of a new campus in Bicester.

=== Guildford College Group ===
In 2019, Activate Learning merged with Guildford College Group including Guildford College, Merrist Wood College and Farnham College.

== Structure ==
Activate Learning currently operates in the following areas of post-compulsory training and education: colleges, schools, training for work and businesses, higher education, business consultancy and international study. Gary Headland is the Group Chief Executive of Activate Learning.

=== Colleges ===
The group runs seven further education colleges: Banbury and Bicester College, Bracknell and Wokingham College, City of Oxford College, Farnham College, Guildford College, Merrist Wood College and Reading College.

Each college provides a variety of education and vocational training courses, primarily for the post-16 sector – school leavers and adults – though they also offer training for 14- to 16-year-olds from local schools.

=== Schools ===
Activate Learning is a lead partner in the running of UTC Reading, the university technical college for 14- to 19-year-olds, which opened September 2013. It is also the lead partner for UTC Oxfordshire, in Didcot, which opened in September 2015. Also from September 2015 Activate Learning is the sponsor of The Bicester School.

=== Higher education ===
The group delivers higher education (university-level) programmes in art and design, business, care, computing, engineering, furniture, motorsports, policing and sports coaching. These programmes include HNDs, foundation degrees and honours degrees. The group also delivers the PGCE teaching and training qualification.

The foundation degree and honours degree programmes are delivered in partnership with local universities, which include Oxford Brookes University and Middlesex University.

=== International ===
Activate Learning runs an international study programme for students from overseas. It is currently in discussions to open schools in Saudi Arabia and China.

=== Training for work and businesses ===
The business-to-business operations of the group are run by Activate Enterprise. It works with businesses to deliver workforce training including apprenticeships, NVQs and short professional courses.

=== Business consultancy ===
Activate Learning provides training in leadership and management to regional businesses and organisations.

== Enterprise and Employability ==
Activate Learning applies an enterprise-focused, employer-oriented approach to its teaching and learning. The group does this in different ways, including:

- New curriculum model – enterprise and commercial activity is built into the curriculum
- Learning companies – commercial companies, set up within the colleges, to provide real services to customers. They are run by students
- SweetFE – a community interest company (CIC) set up by the college to promote enterprise within the group and across the further education sector
- Student start-ups – opportunities for students to start their own businesses
- Gazelle Group membership – the Gazelle Group is a network of colleges which focuses on entrepreneurship in further education. OCVC was a founder member of the Gazelle Group
