= Jacinta Ruru =

New Zealand law professor

Jacinta Ruru MNZM FRSNZ
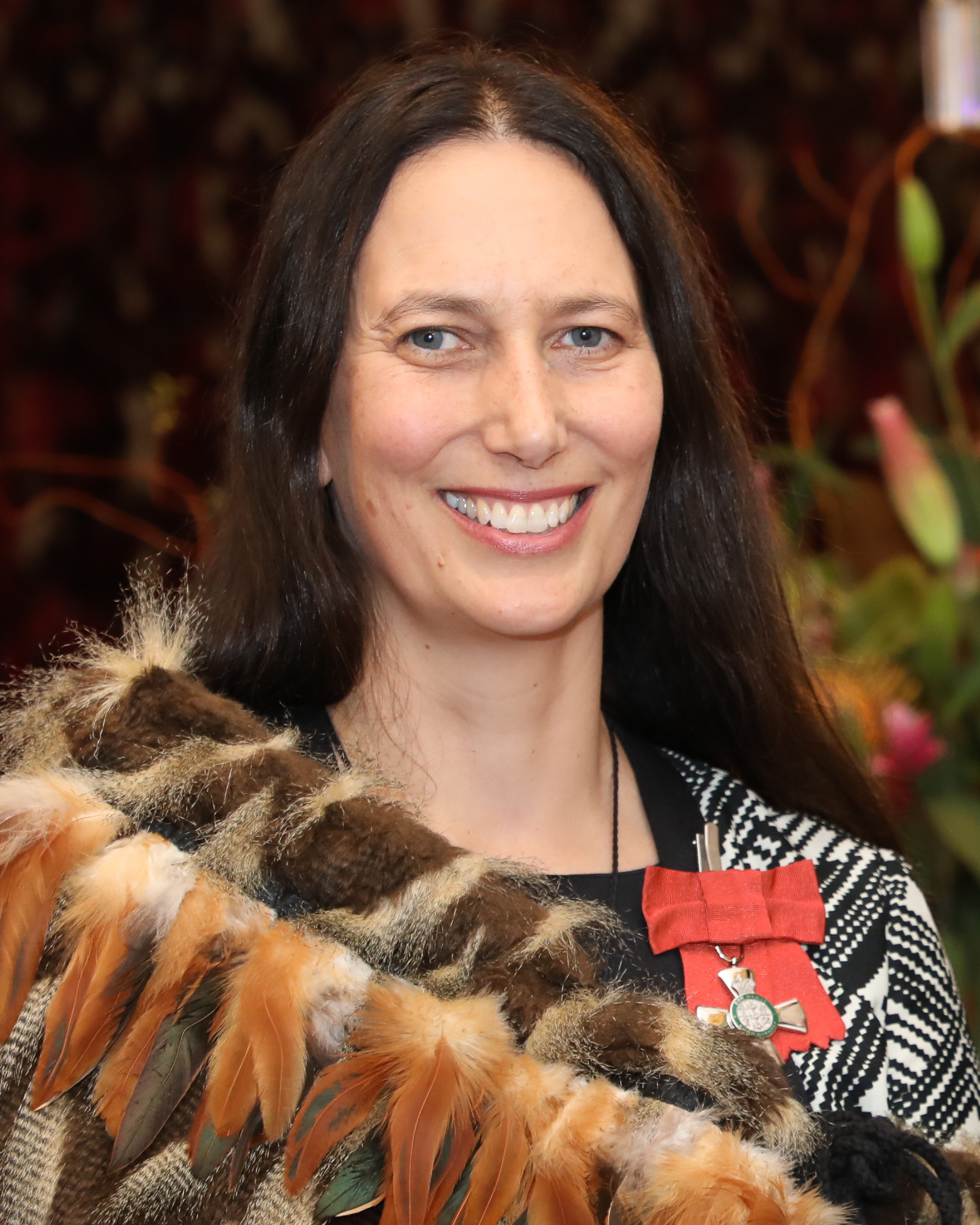
- Ruru in 2022
- Born: 1974 (age 51–52); Kalgoorlie, Australia
- Education: University of Victoria
- Scientific career
- Fields: Indigenous law
- Workplaces: University of Otago
- Thesis: Settling Indigenous place: reconciling legal fictions in governing Canada and Aotearoa New Zealand's national parks. (2012)
- Doctoral advisor: John Borrows
- Website: www.otago.ac.nz/law/staff/jacinta_ruru

Jacinta Arianna Ruru MNZM FRSNZ (born 1974) is a New Zealand academic and the first Māori professor of law. Ruru is the Deputy Vice-Chancellor, Māori, at the University of Otago.

== Academic career ==
Ruru completed a master's degree at the University of Otago in 2001, with a thesis on the Treaty of Waitangi and the national parks of New Zealand. After a 2012 Fulbright-funded PhD at the University of Victoria in Canada, Ruru returned to New Zealand and the University of Otago, becoming a full professor in 2016.

Ruru's research centres on Indigenous peoples' (primarily Māori in New Zealand and First Nations in Canada) legal relations with land and water. She is the co-director of Ngā Pae o te Māramatanga (NPM), New Zealand's Māori Centre of Research Excellence (CoRE). She is a consultant editor to the Māori Law Review.

== Recognition ==
Ruru has won the Prime Minister of New Zealand's supreme award for tertiary teaching and been made a fellow of the Royal Society of New Zealand. In 2017, Ruru was selected as one of the Royal Society Te Apārangi's "150 women in 150 words". In the same year she was invited to give the 10th Shirley Smith Memorial Address. Her speech was called "First laws: tikanga Māori in / and the law".

In October 2019, Ruru was appointed as one of seven inaugural sesquicentennial distinguished chairs, or poutoko taiea, at the University of Otago.

In 2019, Ruru was on the panel that wrote the influential He Puapua report.

In the 2022 New Year Honours, Ruru was appointed a Member of the New Zealand Order of Merit, for services to Māori and the law, and later that year received the University of Otago's Distinguished Research Medal.

In 2025, she was awarded the Humanities Aronui Medal from the Royal Society Te Apārangi and an Honorary Doctor of Laws from Newcastle University.

== Selected works ==
- Ruru, Jacinta (2004). "A politically fuelled tsunami: the foreshore/seabed controversy in Aotearoa Me Te Wai Pounamu/New Zealand." The Journal of the Polynesian Society 113 (1): 57–72.
- Miller, Robert J., and Jacinta Ruru (2008). "An Indigenous Lens into Comparative Law: The Doctrine of Discovery in the United States and New Zealand." West Virginia Law Review 111: 849.
- Ruru, Jacinta (2009). The legal voice of Māori in freshwater governance: a literature review. Manaaki Whenua – Landcare Research. ISBN 978-0-473-15934-4
- Abbott, Mick, Janet Stephenson, and Jacinta Ruru, eds. (2010). Beyond the scene: Landscape and identity in Aotearoa New Zealand. Otago University Press. ISBN 978-1-877372-81-0
- Ruru, Jacinta (2004). "Indigenous peoples' ownership and management of mountains: The Aotearoa/New Zealand experience." Indigenous Law Journal 3: 111–137.
- Ruru, Jacinta, and Linda Waimarie Nikora, eds. (2021). Ngā Kete Mātauranga: Māori scholars at the research interface. Otago University Press. ISBN 978-1-988592-55-8

== Personal life ==
Ruru was born in Kalgoorlie, Australia, where her parents were living at the time. Through her father she is of Raukawa, Ngāti Ranginui, and Ngāti Maniapoto descent. Her mother is Pākehā and was brought up in New Plymouth, and her maternal grandmother was Australian.
