= Judy Bennett (historian) =

New Zealand historian (born 1944)

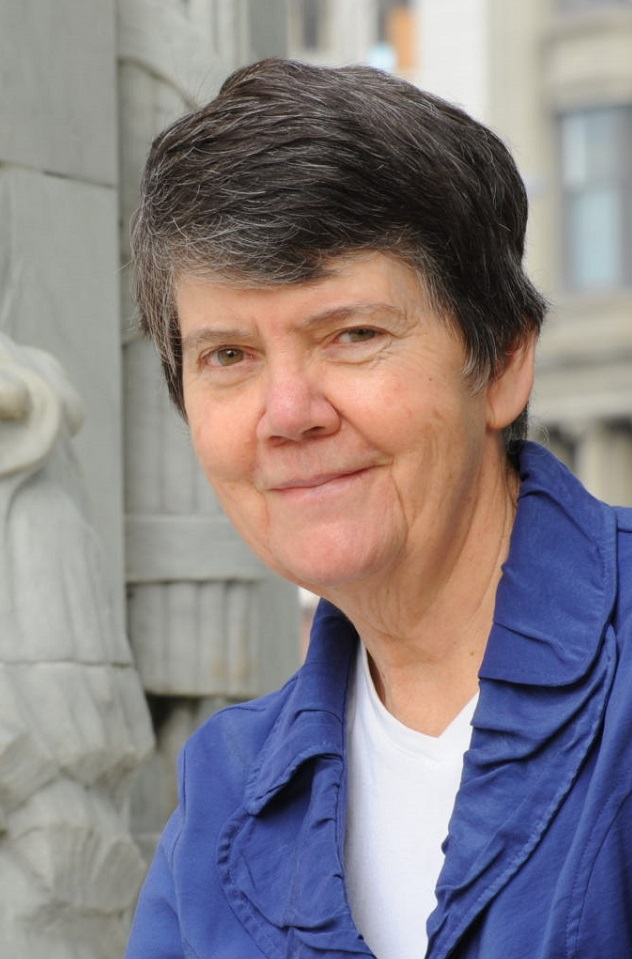
- Bennett in 2010
- Born: 1944 (age 81–82)
- Education: Australian National University
- Scientific career
- Thesis: Wealth of the Solomons : a history of trade, plantations and society, Solomon Islands, c.1800–1942 (1979)

Judith Ann Bennett (born 1944) is a New Zealand historian. She has been emeritus professor at the University of Otago since 2019.

== Academic career ==
Bennett wrote a 1979 PhD thesis at Australian National University titled, Wealth of the Solomons: a history of trade, plantations and society, Solomon Islands, c.1800–1942 studying the colonial history of the Solomon Islands and has spent much of her career researching, writing and teaching about the Pacific and its history.

Bennett has received two Marsden grants, the first to research the children of American servicemen and pacific women and the second to research the history of the coconut and its trade.

== Selected works ==
- Bennett, Judith A.. Wealth of the Solomons: A history of a Pacific archipelago, 1800–1978, Vol. 3. University of Hawaii Press, Honolulu, 1987.
- Bennett, Judith. Roots of conflict in Solomon Islands—though much is taken, much abides: legacies of tradition and colonialism; State, Society and Governance in Melanesia, Discussion Paper 2002/5. Australian National University Press, Canberra, 2002.
- Bennett, Judith A.. Pacific forest: A history of resource control and contest in the Solomon Islands c. 1800–1997. Brill Publishers, 2000.
- Bennett, J. A. and Russell, K. J. (eds). Journeys in a Small Canoe: the life and times of a Solomon Islander, Lloyd Maepeza Gina. Pandanus Press, Australian National University, Canberra, 2003.
- Bennett, Judith A.. Natives and exotics: World War II and environment in the Southern Pacific. University of Hawaii Press, Honolulu, 2009.
- Bayliss-Smith, T and J.A.Bennett (eds). An Otago storeman in Solomon Islands: The diary of William Crossan, copra trader, 1885–86. Australian National University Press, Canberra, 2012.
- Bennett, J. A. (ed.). Oceanian journeys and sojourns: Home thoughts abroad. Otago University Press, Dunedin, 2015.
- Bennett, J.A. and Wanhalla, A (eds). Mothers' Darlings of the South Pacific: the children of Indigenous Women and US Servicemen in World War Two. University of Hawaii Press, Honolulu, and University of Otago Press, Dunedin, 2016.
- Bennett, J. A.. Pacific Coconut: Comestible, Comfort and Commodity. Journal of Pacific History, Vol. 53 No. 4, 2018, 353–74.
- Bennett, J. A.. Voices of Rotuma: Enduring refrain. Journal of Pacific History, Vol. 53 No. 4, 2018, 502–520.
- Bennett, J. A.. Fluid frontiers and uncertain geographies: US controls on immigration from the Pacific (c. 1880–1950). Journal of Pacific History, DOI:10.1080/00223344.2017.1406319, 2017.
- Bennett, J. A.. Meditations: new directions in the study of the decolonization of Melanesia. Journal of Pacific History, Vol. 48 No. 3, 2013, 323–329.
- Bennett, J. A.. Introduction to Pacific Research Protocols at the University of Otago. The Contemporary Pacific, Vol. 25 No. 1, 2013, 95–124.
