= Banbury and Bicester College =

Further education college in Oxfordshire, England

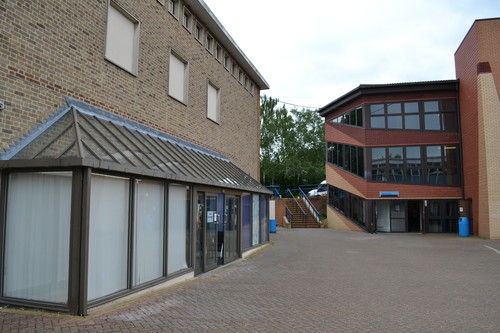
- Banbury and Bicester College
- England

Information
- Type: Further Education College
- Department for Education URN: 134153 Tables
- Gender: Coeducational
- Website: www.banbury-bicester.ac.uk

Banbury and Bicester College is a further education college in Oxfordshire, England. It has two campuses – one in Banbury and one in Bicester.

== Introduction ==
Previously called Oxford & Cherwell Valley College (OCVC) Banbury and Bicester College changed name when the Oxford & Cherwell Valley College Group reorganised and become the Activate Learning group in 2013.

Banbury and Bicester College provides vocational training programmes, primarily for the post-16 sector, across different subjects.

Programmes include vocational training for school leavers and professionals/adults, apprenticeships, higher education, international study, learning for leisure, and courses to help the unemployed get back into work.

== History ==
1.1 North Oxfordshire Technical College and School of Art

North Oxfordshire Technical College and School of Art, in Banbury, has roots from the late 19th century with its current Broughton Road location from a move in the 1950s and was a general further education college that served Banbury and Bicester.

1.2 Oxford and Cherwell College

On 31 July 2003, Oxford College of Further Education merged with North Oxfordshire College in Banbury to become Oxford and Cherwell College.

1.3 Oxford & Cherwell Valley College - New campus

A new campus was opened in Bicester in 2005. This is when the college became Oxford & Cherwell Valley College (OCVC). In 2010 OCVC, along with the Learning Skills Network (LSN), took responsibility for running Reading College. OCVC then became the Oxford & Cherwell Valley College Group.

1.4 Banbury and Bicester College

In 2013, the OCVC Group reorganised and restructured. It became Activate Learning, and the two OCVC colleges (Oxford and Banbury) changed their names.

OCVC (Banbury) became Banbury and Bicester College, whilst OCVC (Oxford) become City of Oxford College.

== Subjects and courses ==
2.1 Full-time study

Subjects available for full-time study at Banbury and Bicester College include art and design, business and enterprise, caring and health, catering and hospitality, construction, electrical, foundation studies, hair and beauty, ICT, media, motorsport, motor vehicle, performing arts, sport, travel and tourism, and uniformed public services. Motorsport is taught at the Bicester campus.

2.2 Higher education

Higher education (HE) is delivered across the Activate Learning group. Different HE programmes are delivered at the different colleges.

The group delivers higher education (university-level) programmes in art and design, business, care, computing, engineering, furniture, motorsports, policing and sports coaching. These programmes include HNDs, foundation degrees and honours degrees.

The group also delivers the PGCE teaching and training qualification.

The foundation degree (Level 5) and honours degree (Level 6) programmes are delivered in partnership with local universities, which include Oxford Brookes University and Bucks New University.

At Banbury and Bicester College there are higher education programmes in art and design, business, care, and motorsport. These are all in partnership with Oxford Brookes University.

2.3 International students

International students are welcome at Banbury and Bicester College. Activate Learning runs an international study programme for students from overseas.

2.4 Part-time study

Part-time study can be professional (qualification based) or leisure (non-qualification based). Part-time subjects with qualifications include accounting, business, catering, hair and beauty, ICT, first aid, teaching and training, security, and skills for life.

Subjects without qualifications focus mostly on the creative arts (e.g. art, photography, textiles, ceramics).

2.5 Apprenticeships and work-based training

Banbury and Bicester College provides apprenticeship training across many of its vocational subjects. These are delivered by Activate Enterprise, the group’s business-to-business service.

2.6 Courses for the unemployed

The college has a Get that Job programme which is for people who are unemployed. It provides free training courses to those who are eligible, and offers help with other skills such as CV writing and interview techniques.

== Campuses ==
Banbury and Bicester College has campuses in Banbury and Bicester.

3.1 Banbury

The campus has on-site facilities for students to do their training. These include hair/beauty salons and a restaurant, and studios for creative arts, music and performing arts. The salons and restaurant are open to customers. It is renowned for its creative arts provision and opened a new creative arts centre in September 2012.

3.2 Bicester

The campus delivers courses in classic vehicle maintenance – see specialist centres below.

== Specialist centres ==
4.1 Performance Engineering Centre

The Bicester campus is also known as Bicester Motorsports. It specialises in motorsports training and has a national reputation within the motorsport industry, and has been known as Roycotte Wood and OCVC Motorsports. This site was one of the first Motorsports Colleges in the UK and is well established in terms of its links to industry. The Foundation Degree in Motorsport: Performance and Automotive Technology, offered in partnership with Oxford Brookes University, is delivered at the Bicester campus. Edit: Banbury campus is now home to Banbury and Bicester College's engineering, motorsports engineering and motor vehicle programmes. The Activate Learning partnership with Bicester Heritage allows students to study classic vehicle restoration programmes in Bicester
