= Mompreneur =

Female entrepreneur

A mompreneur is a female business owner who actively balances the roles of a mother and an entrepreneur. The term was introduced around 1994.

The term has a dedicated section on Entrepreneur magazine's website. There is also a Canadian magazine devoted to the topic, The MOMpreneur Magazine. A 2011 MSNBC article declared the rise of mompreneurs to be a hot topic in the small business sector.

Investopedia adds that "mompreneurs are a relatively new trend in entrepreneurship, and have come to increased prominence in the internet age, with the internet allowing entrepreneurs to sell products out of their homes" rather than relying on foot traffic to brick-and-mortar business.

A 2010 article in U.S. News & World Report aimed to dispel some of the myths associated with the mompreneur movement, including the belief that an innovative product idea will lead to easy money.

Other examples of mompreneur coverage by major news outlets include the nationally syndicated weekly advice column "Ask the Mompreneur" published by The Charlotte Observer website, the city's largest daily publication.

In 2015 Forbes writer and author Christine Michel Carter trademarked "Mompreneur and Me," a national professional development event for female business owners and their children.

== Notable mompreneurs ==
- Tina Brown
- Arianna Huffington
- J. K. Rowling
- Jin Sook Chang
- Diane von Fürstenberg
- Cher Wang
- Zhang Xin
- Julie Aigner-Clark
- Liz Lange
- Dame Stephanie Shirley

== See also ==
- Working Mother
- Work–life balance
- Girlboss
