= History of the Gisborne District =

The Gisborne District or Gisborne Region has a deep and complex history that dates back to the early 1300s. The region, on the East Coast of New Zealand's North Island, has many culturally and historically significant sites that relate to early Māori exploration in the 14th century and important colonial events, such as Captain Cook's first landfall in New Zealand.

== First arrivals ==
For over seven centuries the Gisborne District has been inhabited by the tribes of Te Whānau-a-Kai, Ngaariki Kaiputahi, Rongowhakaata, Ngāi Tāmanuhiri, Te Aitanga-a-Māhaki, Ngāti Porou and Te Aitanga-a-Hauiti. According to Māori tradition, these iwi descended from three main groups of migrants, the crews of the Te Ikaroa-a-Rauru, Horouta and Tākitimu waka, which were part of a larger seven-canoe migration from Hawaiki around 1350 AD.

=== Māui and Paikea ===
The Ngāti Porou iwi of the East Cape cite the god-like figure Māui as being fundamental to their history. It is said that he is the ancestor who binds Ngāti Porou descendants to the beginnings of human existence. Māui's canoe Nukutaimemeha is the most ancient waka associated with the region. In it he is said to have fished up the North Island from the bottom of the ocean. According to tribal tradition, Nukutaimemeha now lies upturned in stone on Mt Hikurangi, another significant cultural icon.

Ngāti Porou derive their name from their ancestor Porourangi, a descendant of Māui. Porourangi's wife, Hamoterangi, migrated on Te Ikaroa a Rauru waka which belonged to Māia, brother-in-law of Uenuku, who bought with him precious gourd seeds. Te Ikaroa a Rauru came ashore on the Kaiti side of the Tūranganui River, close to Tuamotu, and the crew occupied this area as well as the banks of the Taruheru stream. Māia lived at the Puhi Kaiti pā.

Paikea is also a key ancestor in East Coast history who is said to have come from Hawaiki on the back of a whale. Traditions recount how, on his journey to New Zealand, Paikea's canoe sunk and his brothers drowned. After calling upon the guardians of the sea to help him, a taniwha in the form of a whale came to his rescue and carried him to land at Ahuahu (Great Mercury Island). From here he went on to Whakatāne, and eventually to Whangara on the East Coast.

=== Horouta, Takitimu and Te Ikaroa-a-Rauru ===
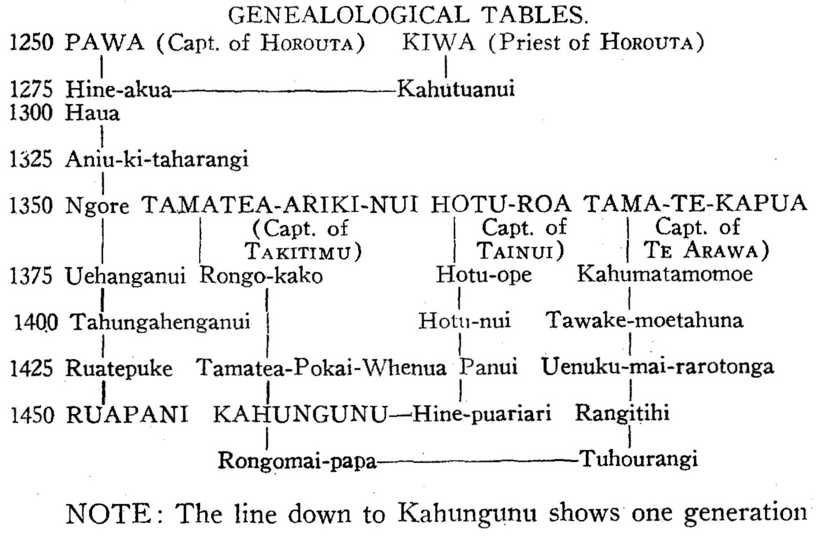
Genealogical table of Pawa and Kiwa of the Horouta

Whilst it is generally accepted that the tribes of the East Coast descend from the voyagers of the three above mentioned waka, local oral traditions offer differing versions of account regarding their arrival in the region. The learned Māoris of the past regarded their history as being exceedingly sacred, or tapu, and therefore imparting it to a stranger rendered it 'polluted' or 'common'. Being the most sacred canoe of all in the migration, the Tākitimu's history was held strictly tapu. Subsequently, two versions of its story exist, one of the Northern East Coast which tells of the crew disembarking at Mahia, and the other of the Southern East Coast which maintains that the Tākitimu landed at several places along the East Coast including Ūawa (Tolaga Bay) and Tūranganui (Gisborne).

In one account, the great navigator Kiwa was the commander aboard the Tākitimu canoe which made the first landfall in the region from Hawaiki. In this version, Pāoa (or Pawa), captain of the waka Horouta, is said to have followed later. However, another widely accepted version of events is that Horouta preceded Tākitimu (possibly by as much as 100 years) with both Pāoa and Kiwa aboard, and that Tamatea was commander of Tākitimu. In 1931, Sir Āpirana Ngata maintained in an address to the Tairawhiti Maori Association that Horouta was in fact the main canoe that brought the people to the East Coast, not the Takitimu, and that Ngāti Porou had always regarded Tākitimu as "an unimportant canoe". Māori historian Rongowhakaata Halbert also affirmed this in his book 'Horouta' (1999).

Originally, the great Polynesian explorer Toi had given the Horouta to Kahukura so he could retrieve kumara from Hawaiki. After retrieving the vegetables, Horouta returned to New Zealand with Pāoa as her commander and Kiwa her priest. The canoe first made landfall at Ahuahu, followed by the Bay of Plenty and Te Muriwai, where Pāoa's sister Hinehakirirangi disembarked and decided to stay. Horouta then continued across the bay around until it came ashore on the west bank of the Tūranganui River. Kiwa was first to set foot on land (either as the new commander of a skeleton crew, or because it was customary for a priest to do so), and thus named the land "Tūranganui-a-Kiwa" (The great standing place of Kiwa).

Many place-names were left by the Horouta crew including the Waipaoa River, Te Kurī-o-Pāoa (Young Nick's Head), and Te Tuahenitanga-a-Pawa (Tuahine Point).

== Early history (c. 1350 – 1900) ==
=== Māori settlement ===
During the fourteenth century, Māori tribes built fishing villages close to the sea and built pā on nearby hilltops.

In fifteenth century, Ruapani, a descendant of Pāoa and Kiwa, became paramount chief of the Tūranga tribes. He had a great pā, known as Popoia, on the western bank of the Waipaoa River at Waituhi. Ruapani had three wives who between them bore 25 children. Many prominent Māori leaders descend from Ruapani including Te Kani-a-Takirau, the Te Heuheu dynasty of Ngāti Tuwharetoa, Te Rauparaha, Hēnare Tomoana, Te Kooti, Wi Pere, Sir James Carroll, Sir Māui Pōmare and Sir Āpirana Ngata.

Several major conflicts occurred in the region between neighbouring tribes over the following centuries, which led to the spread of influence of Porourangi's descendants.

=== Captain Cook's landing ===
On 8 October 1769, Captain James Cook made his historic first landing in New Zealand upon the Endeavour at Gisborne's Kaiti Beach. Cook had earlier set off from Plymouth, England in August 1768 on a mission bound for Tahiti. Once he had concluded his duties in Tahiti, Cook continued south to look for a large landmass or continent. Young Nick's Head was thought to be the first piece of New Zealand land sighted by Cook's party, and so named because it was first observed by cabin boy Nicholas Young on October 6.

On October 9, Cook came ashore on the eastern bank of the Tūranganui River, accompanied by a party of men. Their arrival was marred by misunderstanding and resulted in the death and wounding of nine Maori over four days. Cook dubbed the place Poverty Bay because "it afforded us no one thing we wanted." Before leaving the region, the Endeavour visited Anaura and Tolaga bays where they had more positive interactions with Māori.

Cook's landing site on Kaiti Beach was commemorated by a monument in 1906, on the 137th anniversary of Cook's arrival. In 1964 the Gisborne committee of the New Zealand Historic Places Trust registered the land around the monument as a historic reserve, and in 1990 it was designated a National Historic Reserve and put under the care of the Department of Conservation.

=== Musket Wars ===
With the arrival of European whaling and trading ships in the early 1800s, the northern tribes of Ngapuhi and Ngati Whatua were able to trade flax, potatoes, fruit and pigs for muskets. As muskets were made more readily available, intertribal warfare intensified, as did Kaitangata (cannibalism), slavery and the pursuit of utu (revenge). During this time the East Coast region was decimated by the northern tribes, as Ngāpuhi chiefs Pōmare and Te Wera Hauraki waged a number of battles against local iwi. Most notable was the 1820 massacre of Ngati Porou hapu by Pōmare's war party during a six-month siege in Te Whetumatarau pa at Te Araroa.

=== European settlement and town growth ===
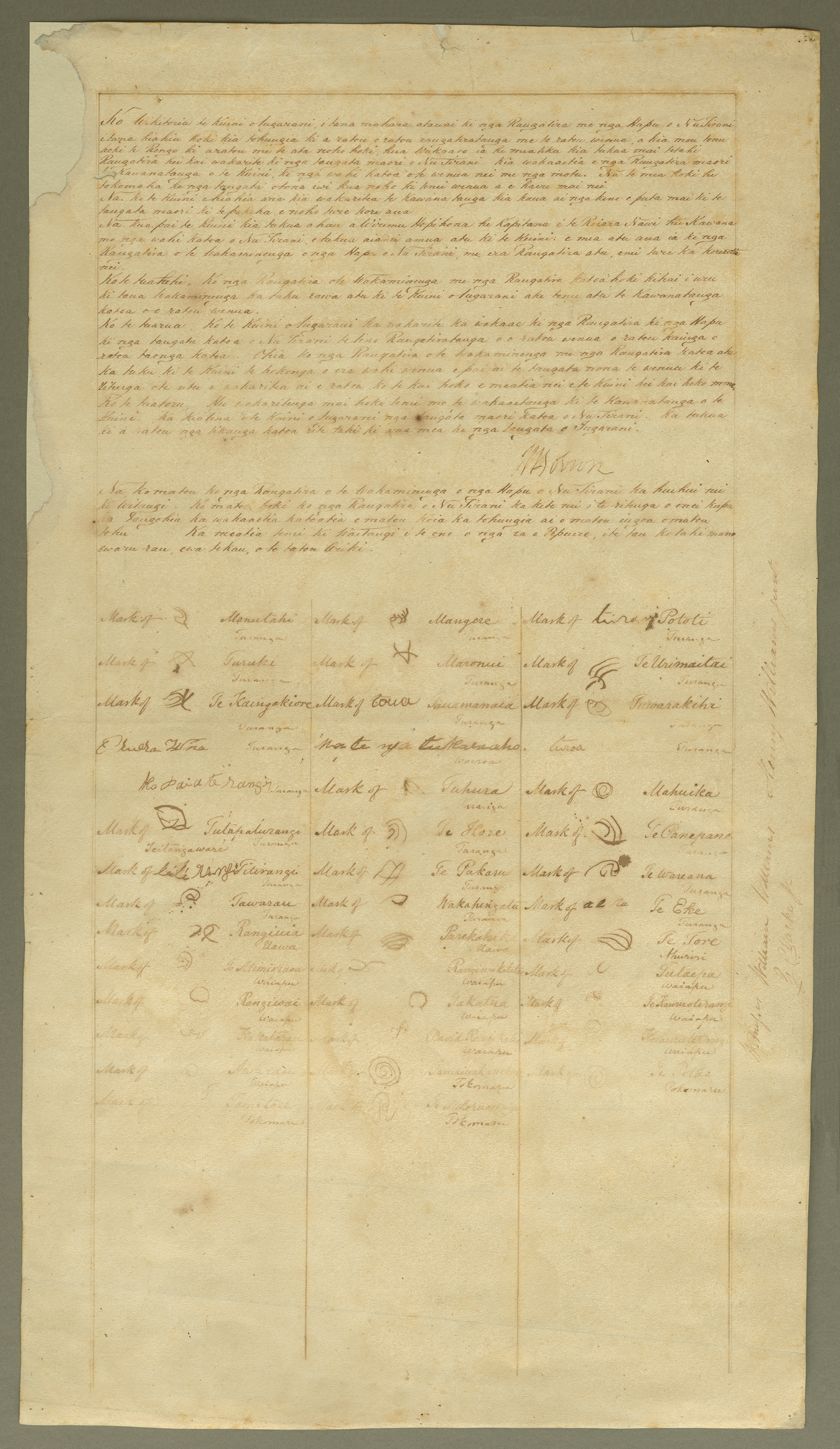
The East Coast sheet of the Treaty of Waitangi, signed by 24 Tūranga chiefs

European settlement did not begin in the Gisborne District until the early 1830s, when traders such as Captain John Harris and Captain George E. Read set up the first trading stations along the Tūranganui River. The Anglican Church became a strong influence in many Māori communities during this time, as the Church Missionary Society extended its reach to the East Cape. In 1840, William Williams, a missionary and linguist, established a mission station in the Poverty Bay area (or Tūranga as it was then known).

Over the next 30 years, many more European traders and missionaries migrated to the region, where flax, muskets, blankets, tobacco were the main products of trade. In May 1840, 24 chiefs from the Tūranga district signed the Treaty of Waitangi. Land was then sold or leased, and more systematic European settlement of the area began. The Māori people of Tūranganui-a-Kiwa made the most of business and trading opportunities, with some hapū beginning to ship produce long distance to a prospering Auckland.

=== Conflict in the 1860s ===
During the early 1860s conflict had broken out between Māori and the government over ownership of land and authority. Initially few people of the Tūranganui-a-Kiwa tribes were drawn into these wars, but attitudes changed when the government began to confiscate Māori land.

As the Pai Mārire (Hauhau) religious movement spread their anti-colonisation ideology into the Poverty Bay region, infighting broke out in Ngati Porou and the iwi was split into two factions, the Hauhau converts and those who stood to resist their invasion. Hauhau sought to drive Pākehā from Māori land and gain support for Kīngitanga, the movement to create a Māori nation under a Māori king. Major conflict erupted on the East Coast when government forces and those of Ngati Porou who had pledged allegiance to the crown sought to drive Hauhau from pā in the region. The most noted leaders who rose against the Hauhau forces in Ngāti Porou land were Rāpata Wahawaha, Hōtene Porourangi, Tuta Nihohiho, Hēnare Pōtae and Mōkena Kōhere.

Internal conflicts followed in a number of places from northern Waiapu to Tokomaru Bay, Tolaga Bay, and Tūranganui–Waerenga-a-hika. They ended in the pursuit of Te Kooti through the Urewera in 1870.

== 20th century ==
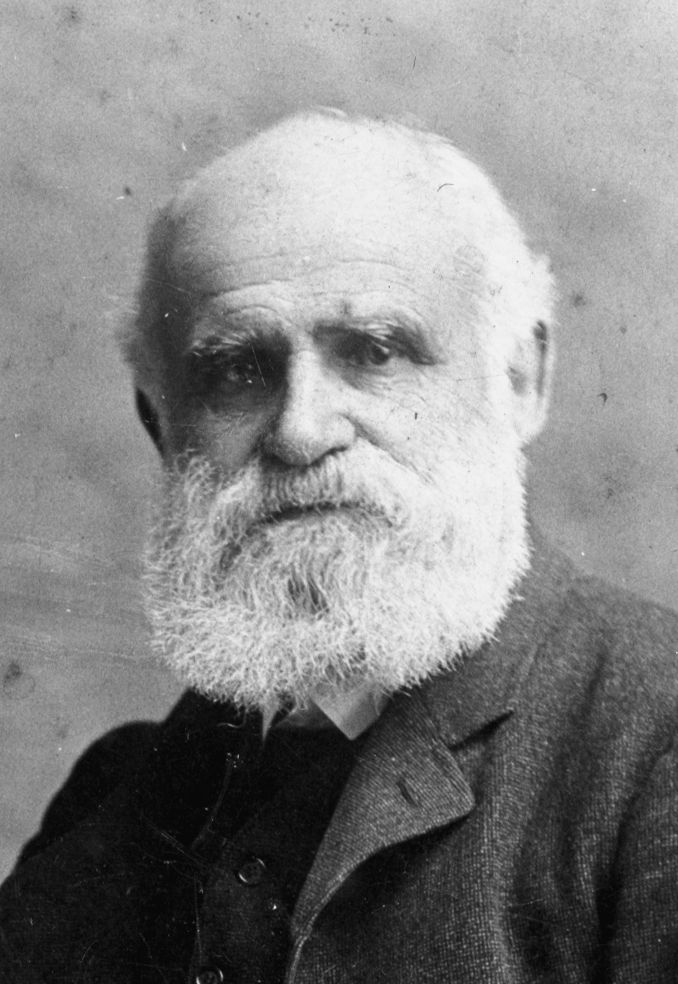
William Gisborne, who the town is named after, circa 1895

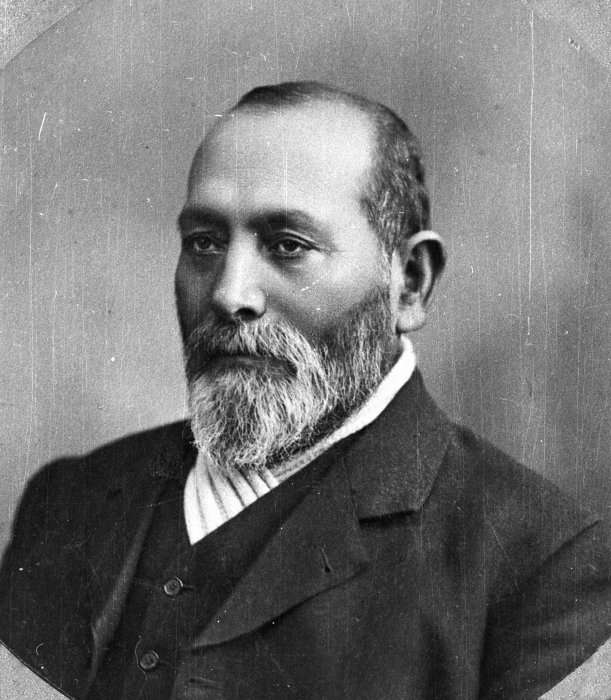
Wī Pere, parliamentarian

The end of the 19th century marked an end to conflict and the beginning of flourishing trade opportunities along the coast. A thriving pastoral hinterland and two new freezing works boosted development and as a result many other industries were established.

In 1868 the government bought 300 hectares of land in Tūranga for a town site. The town was laid out in 1870 and the name changed from Tūranga to Gisborne, after the then colonial secretary William Gisborne, and to avoid confusion with Tauranga. In 1872, Gisborne's first public school was opened and its first newspaper, the Poverty Bay Standard was established. A town council was formed in 1877.

Wī Pere represented Eastern Māori in the House of Representatives as a Māori Member of Parliament, 1884 to 1887 and 1893 to 1905. Pere strongly criticised the government's Māori land policies and had been involved in the New Zealand wars in the 1860s and 1870s as a leader.

From the 1890s onwards, Ngati Porou leader Āpirana Ngata rose to prominence as a political leader and staunch advocate for Māori development on the East Coast. His leadership helped revitalise the Māori population and morale through administration of farm land, cultural revival in the arts and literature, and promotion of sports. Ngata helped to organise Māori participation in both world wars and is remembered as the 'father of the Māori Battalion'.

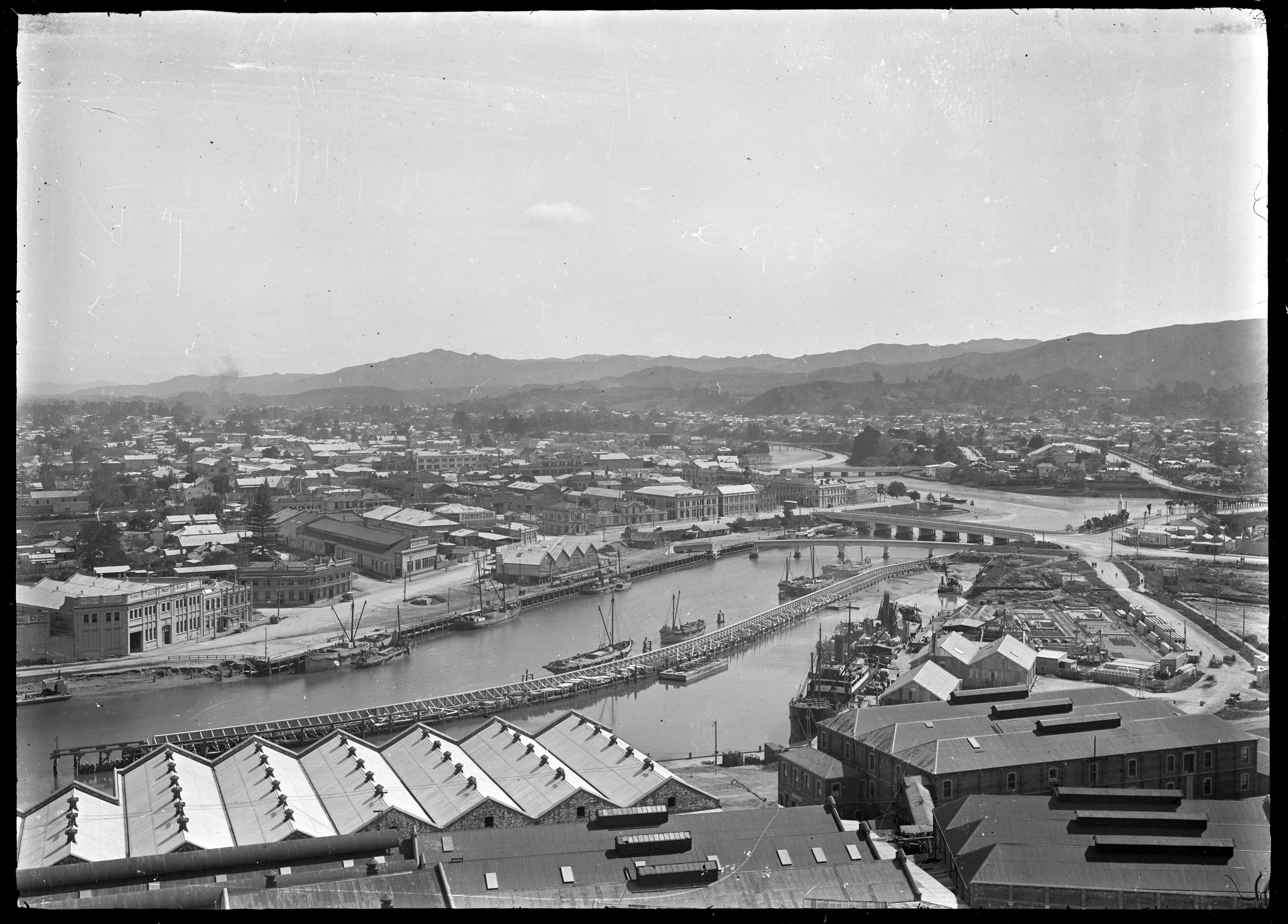
View over Gisborne in the 1920s ATLIB 291659

By 1926 the population of Gisborne had risen to 15,000. It was overwhelmingly Pākehā (European) – fewer than 2% were Māori. However, the opening of a new meeting house at Te Poho-o-Rāwiri marae in 1930 was a major public event that bought many Māori to the area. By that time Gisborne had developed into a provincial capital with an improved harbour, a post office, a high school and a flourishing main street (Gladstone Road). Homes were built along the banks of the Taruheru River, along with a botanical garden.

Pastoral farming continued to thrive during the 1950s and 1960s. The port was complemented by a rail link and an airport, and a food-processing and canning industry developed. Gisborne attained city status on August 8, 1955, with a population of 20,000.

From the second half of the 20th century, the Gisborne region began to grow as a major centre of Māori culture. While in 1961 the Māori population in the area was just under 12% of the total, by 2013 it had increased to 49%, the highest proportion of any regional population. The 2013 New Zealand census revealed that over 30% of Māori residents in Gisborne speak Māori.

In March 1988 Cyclone Bola hit Gisborne and the East Cape, bringing torrential rain that flooded the area for more than three days and caused significant damage to homes and farm land, costing the horticulture industry an estimated $90 million. Three people died and thousands were evacuated from their homes. Cyclone Bola resulted in a government repair bill of more than $111 million.

Due to its proximity to the international dateline, Gisborne has long regarded itself as the first city in the world to see the sun rise each day. Over the 1999/2000 new year, Gisborne hosted major celebrations as the world's first major settlement to witness the dawn of the new millennium. The festivities, which included a performance by opera singer Kiri te Kanawa, were broadcast to television audiences worldwide.
