= Reta Keiha =

Kingi Areta Keiha
- Born: 24 December 1900; Gisborne, New Zealand
- Died: 29 May 1961 (aged 60); Hexton, New Zealand
- Relatives: Riperata Kahutia (Grandmother). Heni Materoa Carroll (aunt)
- Military career
- Allegiance: New Zealand
- Branch: New Zealand Military Forces
- Rank: Lieutenant Colonel
- Service number: 39620
- Commands: Māori Battalion
- Conflicts: Second World War: Battle of Greece; Battle of Crete; First Battle of El Alamein; Second Battle of El Alamein
- Awards: Military Cross

Kingi Areta Keiha MC (24 December 1900 – 29 May 1961) was a New Zealand law clerk, interpreter, soldier, Māori welfare officer and farmer. Of Māori descent, he identified with the Rongowhakaata, Te Aitanga-a-Hauiti and Te Aitanga-a-Mahaki iwi. He was born in Gisborne, East Coast, New Zealand on 24 December 1900. His father was Mikaere (Mikaera) Pare Keiha Turangi, brother of Heni Materoa Carroll, who was married to Sir James Carroll.

== Early life and family ==
Keiha was educated at Gisborne School, and attending Otago Boys' High School, where he became a prefect, served as a cadet platoon sergeant and distinguished himself in rugby, cricket and swimming. In 1920 he joined the Gisborne legal firm of Nolan and Skeet as a law clerk, later qualifying as a first-grade Māori interpreter.

On 5 April 1926, at Wairoa, Hawke's Bay. Keiha married Mabel Ida Hinekauia Peakman. She was the daughter of Taraipine Pango Huka of Ngāi Te Ipu, a hapū of Ngāti Kahungunu at Whakakī and William Henry Peakman, a sheep farm manager. Mabel had worked as a typist with the Hawke's Bay legal firm Sainsbury, Logan and Williams prior to their marriage.

== Sport ==
Throughout the early 1920s Keiha was accomplished in cricket, rugby and golf.

He initially played Rugby for Otago Boys' High School. However, Golf quickly became his chief pastime. Keiha became a long-time member of the Poverty Bay Golf Club and competed regularly in club championships and representative matches throughout the 1920s and early 1930s.

He represented Poverty Bay in interprovincial matches against Napier and Wairoa, and qualified for major amateur championships, including the New Zealand Amateur Championship at Shirley in 1925 and the Hawke's Bay Golf Championships in 1929.

By the outbreak of the Second World War Keiha was recognised as one of Gisborne's best-known Māori sportsmen. Contemporary newspaper reports described him as a prominent player of the Poverty Bay Golf Club who had competed in a New Zealand amateur championship.

== Military service ==
Keiha reached battalion command of the 28th Māori Battalion during its last action in North Africa.

Keiha was among the earliest Gisborne volunteers to enrol for service with the proposed Māori Battalion. His enlistment was announced in October 1939, when he was described as a married 39-year-old law clerk and interpreter from Gisborne.

In January 1940 Keiha was selected as one of four Gisborne men nominated to attend the Army Training School at Trentham to qualify as officers before embarking with the first Māori contingent for overseas service. The other nominees included the future military leader and author Arapeta Awatere.

Commissioned into the 28th (Māori) Battalion, Keiha served throughout the Greek, Crete and North African campaigns, gaining a reputation for courage and leadership. After recovering from illness following the battalion's first operations in the Western Desert, he rejoined his unit during the fighting in Egypt.

During the First Battle of El Alamein Keiha commanded a company of the battalion and was awarded the Military Cross for gallantry. Contemporary newspapers also reported that, after the battalion's commanding officer Lieutenant-Colonel Eruera Love had been wounded, Keiha temporarily commanded the unit until the second-in-command arrived from the base.

November 1942, Keiha was promoted to the rank of Major. Following the wounding of Lieutenant-Colonel Charles Bennett during the Tunisian campaign at Takrouna in April 1943, Keiha again assumed temporary command as Lieutenant Colonel of the battalion. leading it through its final operations in North Africa and becoming one of only a small number of Māori officers to command the celebrated unit. Ill health eventually forced Keiha's return to New Zealand. He arrived home in January 1944 and was among a draft of sick and wounded personnel returning from the Middle East.

On his arrival at Gisborne he received a civic welcome at the railway station before being welcomed at Te Poho-o-Rawiri Marae. Deputy Mayor Herbert Hagan DeCosta noted that Keiha had "left Gisborne as a private, sailed from New Zealand as a second lieutenant and has returned with the high rank of lieutenant-colonel", recognising his rise through the ranks and his distinguished service with the Māori Battalion.

== Later career ==
After returning from military service, Keiha joined the newly established Rehabilitation Department as a Māori Rehabilitation Officer, assisting returned Māori servicemen with their transition to civilian life.

Keiha was active in tribal and civic affairs. His standing as a decorated military officer, licensed interpreter and senior Māori leader made him an influential intermediary between Māori communities and government agencies throughout the post-war period.

He later transferred to the Māori Affairs Department, serving as District Māori Welfare Officer for Tai Rāwhiti. In that role he worked closely with Māori communities throughout the East Coast on welfare, housing and community development before leaving the department in 1951 to enter private practice as a licensed Māori interpreter and Māori agent.

Keiha was involved in the establishment of the Māori Museum Committee at the Gisborne Museum, which held its inaugural meeting on 25 March 1955. Other Members included Rongowhakaata Halbert, Percy Leo Fowler, Harold Herbert Carr and others.

== Titirangi Domain ==
Keiha remained closely connected with the ancestral lands of his Whānau (family) at Titirangi (Kaiti Hill). In October 1949 he represented the descendants of the original Māori owners during the formal transfer of Titirangi Domain into public trusteeship following its acquisition by the Gisborne Returned Services' Association.

Speaking on behalf of his whānau, Keiha emphasised the cultural significance of Titirangi:

"This is historic ground on which we stand. It was in olden times the gathering-place and the school of those whom our people selected for training in leadership."

He explained that his whānau had agreed to transfer their interests in the land in the expectation that it would be preserved permanently for public benefit and that the historic pā site would remain protected.

The ceremony acknowledged that the original donation of Māori land interests by Lady Hēni Materoa Carroll and Pare Keiha had made possible the establishment of the public reserve. The trust provisions also required that nothing should desecrate the historic site of the famous Titirangi Pā.

== Death and legacy ==
Keiha died suddenly at his home at Hexton on 29 May 1961, aged 60. He was survived by his wife, one daughter and three sons.

Keiha demonstrated his commitment to people throughout his life, and is remembered as one of the most distinguished Māori officers to serve with the 28th (Māori) Battalion from Tūranga (Gisborne), as well as actions that continue to impact today such as the gifting of Titirangi Domain.
