= Heni Materoa Sunderland =

Māori kaumātua (community leader)

Heni Sunderland QSM JP
- Born: Heni Materoa Brown; 13 October 1916; Manutuke, New Zealand
- Died: 16 July 2008 (aged 91)
- Spouse: James Sunderland
- Children: 1
- Parent(s): Erena Te Ahuahu Maynard and Eruera Brown

Heni Materoa Sunderland QSM JP (née Brown; 13 October 1916 – 16 July 2008), affectionately known as Nanny Heni, was a Māori kaumātua (community leader) of the Rongowhakaata, Ngāi Tāmanuhiri and Te Aitanga-a-Māhaki tribes of Tūranganui-a-Kiwa, New Zealand.

Sunderland was an advocate for women's rights within her community. She was described in a tribute as "a formidable woman of the nicest kind. She was a tower of strength, a fierce defender of her people's mana, an eloquent advocate and representative, a wonderful matriarch and a generous supporter of younger generations."

== Early life ==
Sunderland was born at Manutuke, Poverty Bay, in 1916 to Erena Te Ahuahu Maynard and Eruera Brown. She was raised by her grandparents at Motoi Tapunga at Pītī Taone (Beach Town), a settlement within Te Muriwai at the foot of Te Kuri (Young Nick's Head). Her first language was te reo Māori, and she grew up within a largely te reo Māori-speaking community.

Sunderland grew up in a community that had lost effective control over much of its land. The Pākōwhai block had been mortgaged to the Bank of New Zealand in 1888 without the knowledge or consent of its owners. Following the financial collapse of Wi Pere's New Zealand Native Land Settlement Company, the lands came under the administration of the East Coast Commissioner, returning to the owners as an incorporation only in 1953. Most of the community was relocated inland, although several families, including Sunderland's whānau, continued living beside the lagoon at Pītī Taone, outside the recognised freehold area. Over time, coastal erosion and changes to the river destroyed the lagoon and submerged the site of Sunderland's childhood home. She later recalled: "I could never ever say where our house was."

By the time of Sunderland's birth, only twenty-one acres at Muriwai had been recognised as freehold land, with the remainder of the community continuing to occupy their customary lands without legal title. At a conference of local governing bodies, they were called "squatters", and it was suggested that they "should be treated as trespassers".

The settlement had also experienced repeated outbreaks of enteric fever. In 1912, health authorities attributed the outbreaks to the pā's low-lying, swampy location and reliance on shallow wells, and urged that the settlement be relocated. The following year, the District Health Officer condemned insanitary dwellings, while the East Coast Commissioner oversaw the removal of the settlement to higher ground, where most of the community established the present-day Muriwai village.

As a child, she learned much of her traditional knowledge from her grandparents and her uncle, Hori Te Awarau. She also frequently visited the home of her namesake, Lady Heni Materoa Carroll. She attended Muriwai School, where, like many Māori children of her generation, she was punished for speaking te reo Māori. She later credited her bilingual upbringing with enabling her to move confidently between Māori and Pākehā communities.

Sunderland attended Manutuke School from 1923 to 1925 before transferring to Muriwai School, where she completed her education. With no opportunity to attend secondary school, she left Muriwai School at the end of 1930, aged fourteen, after gaining her proficiency certificate. She spent the following seven years at home, milking cows, playing hockey and assisting with household chores. During this time, she regularly shared meals with the Anglican mission workers at Manutuke and assisted them in their work.

== Career ==
Impressed by the example of Bishop Frederick Augustus Bennett, Sunderland offered herself for training as a Māori mission worker and was sent to the Māori mission school at Whakarewarewa, Rotorua. She trained for four years before serving fourteen years with the Anglican Māori Mission. After becoming seriously ill during her training, she was transferred to Tokomaru Bay following discussions between her father, Archdeacon Hodgson and Bishop Bennett.

While serving there, her father was killed in a motor accident, and she was sent home for six months after being diagnosed as a suspected tuberculosis case. Following her recovery, she resumed missionary work, serving at Rotorua, Tokomaru Bay, Ruatōki and Manutuke, where she undertook parish work, organised church guilds and coordinated fundraising for the Anglican Church.

Sunderland subsequently spent six years assisting public health nurses working in remote Māori communities. In 1955, she married Jim Sunderland at the Toko Toru Tapu Church at Manutuke; they had a son, Michael. She then joined the Department of Māori Affairs as a community officer in 1960, a position she held for twenty-one years. In this role, she supported vulnerable women, children and families within Māori communities. She later credited her missionary service with teaching her the importance of confidentiality, trust and respect.

== Community leadership ==
Following her retirement, Sunderland became recognised as a respected kuia of Rongowhakaata and Ngāi Tāmanuhiri. She was widely consulted on matters of tikanga, whakapapa and tribal history, and represented her iwi in many functions. She was also active in the Māori Women's Welfare League and the kōhanga reo movement, and advocated strongly for Māori language revitalisation.

She was involved with her marae, Whakatō. She advocated for the rights of wahine (women) when the local men declared that only men would be allowed to speak at the marae in Manutuke because they had installed a paepae. Sunderland recalled that this was an inequality her grandmothers had not seen; she did not accept the new rules and continued to speak as an equal.

In 1986, during the welcome for the return of the Te Māori exhibition, Sunderland was interviewed by broadcaster Haare Williams. Asked about the return of taonga to New Zealand and the impact on young people, she replied:

With our young people, they've become so very aware of their own identity, and for me when they see this exhibition of Te Māori, they are going to stand tall and be proud. Proud like those kaumātua and those kuia, those people of yesteryear—who were proud people—and I look to our young people of today and tomorrow being as proud as they.

== Kōhanga reo ==
Sunderland's involvement with the kōhanga reo movement began after she came to regret that she had not raised her son Michael as a te reo Māori speaker. She recalled that his request for her to teach te reo Māori to his daughter made her realise she had "brought him up as a Pākehā". This experience reinforced her belief that a secure Māori identity enabled Māori to engage confidently with the wider world, and that Māori language revitalisation was essential to restoring confidence, pride and a sense of identity in Māori families.

== Legacy ==
In the 1991 New Year Honours, Sunderland was awarded the Queen's Service Medal for community service. Her knowledge of Māori traditions meant that she was extensively consulted by authors writing about the culture.

In the early 2000s, Sunderland was a witness before the Waitangi Tribunal during the Tūranganui-a-Kiwa (Wai 814) inquiry, where she gave evidence on the history of the district, the legacy of early European settlement, the pursuit of the prophet Te Kooti Rikirangi Te Turuki, and the confiscation of Rongowhakaata lands. She also contributed to Rongowhakaata's negotiations with the Crown over the future of Te Hau ki Tūranga.

Sunderland died in July 2008. The following year she was awarded a posthumous honorary doctorate by the University of Waikato.

== Bibliography ==
- Binney, Judith; Chaplin, Gillian (1986). Ngā Mōrehu: The Survivors. Auckland: Oxford University Press.
