= Titirangi (hill) =

Hill and historic pā in Gisborne, New Zealand

- Kaiti Hill, Te Taumata o Tamaterongo
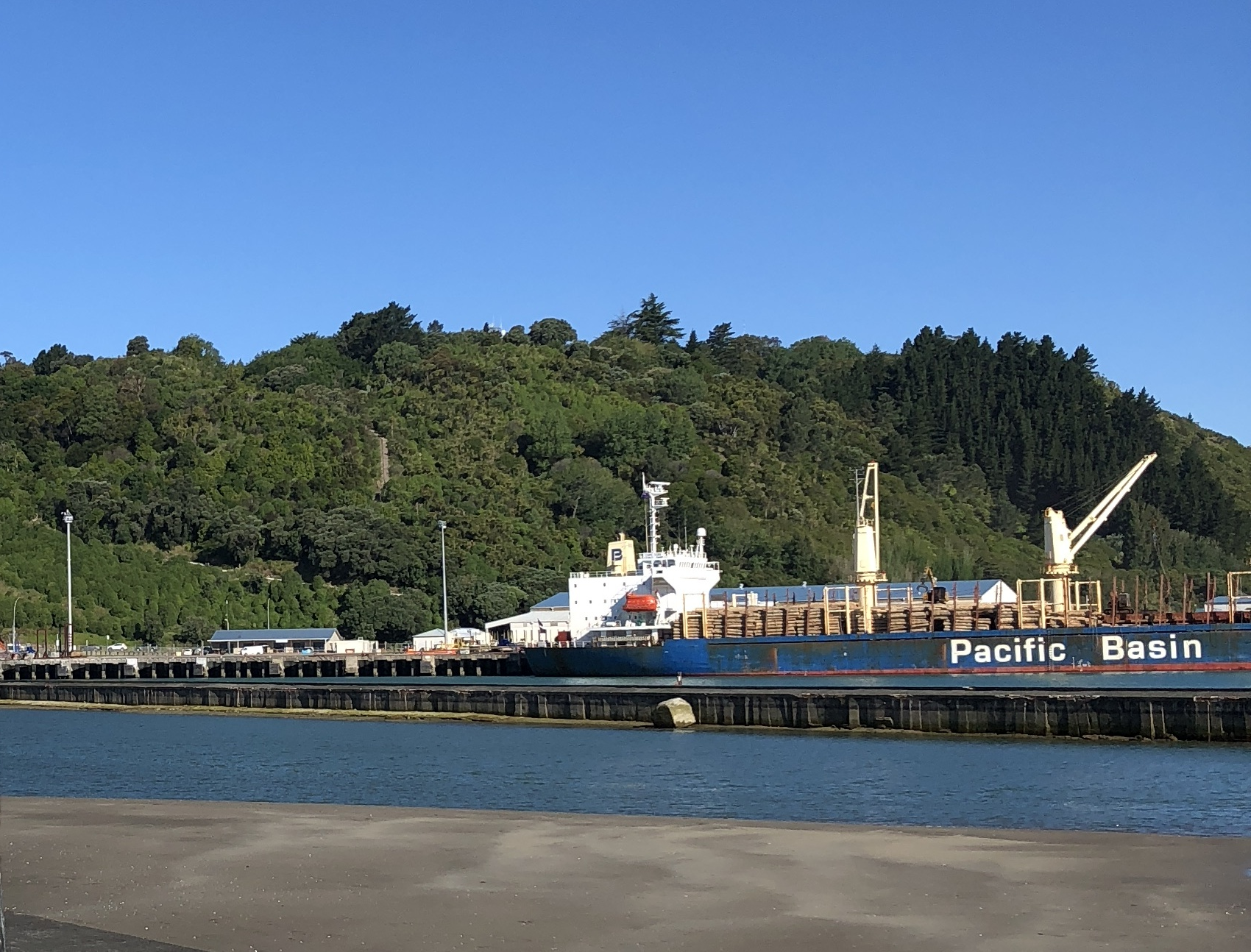
- Titirangi seen from Waikanae Beach

Highest point
- Elevation: 129 m (423 ft)
- Coordinates: 38.678°S 178.031°E

Geography
- Location: Kaitī, Gisborne, North Island, New Zealand

Titirangi, commonly known as Kaiti Hill, is a hill and historic pā overlooking Tūranganui-a-Kiwa (Gisborne), New Zealand. Rising above the eastern bank of the Tūranganui River, it has long been one of the principal cultural and historical landmarks of the district. The hill occupies an important place in the traditions of Rongowhakaata, Te Aitanga-a-Māhaki and their constituent hapū, and overlooks Puhi Kai Iti / Cook Landing Site, where the first recorded encounters between Māori and the expedition commanded by James Cook occurred in October 1769.

== History ==
=== Early Māori occupation ===
Titirangi has long been one of the principal centres of occupation in Tūranganui-a-Kiwa. The hill formed part of the customary lands of the descendants of Ruapani and was occupied by the hapū of Rongowhakaata and Te Aitanga-a-Māhaki, including Ngāi Tāwhiri and Te Whānau-a-Iwi.

According to tribal traditions, Titirangi was a pā of Ruapani, the paramount chief of Tūranga. It was here that Kahungunu first arrived in the district before travelling to nearby Popoia, where he married Ruapani's daughter Ruarauhanga.

Rongowhakaata Halbert records that Titirangi was later occupied by Te Aringiwaho, the rangatira of Te Whānau-a-Iwi. During the migration of Ngāti Rakai from Whareongaonga, Rakaiataane first settled his people at Pukaingākākahu on the Tatapouri headland before visiting Titirangi, where he was received by Te Aringiwaho and Kaumaiwaho. The meeting preceded later conflict between the two groups.

Later traditions also record the hill by the name Te Taumata o Tamaterongo, after Tamaterongo, an ancestor of Ngāi Tāwhiri.

=== Cook's arrival ===
Titirangi overlooks Ōnepoto (Kaiti Beach) and Puhi Kai Iti / Cook Landing Site, where the first recorded encounters between Māori and the expedition commanded by James Cook occurred in October 1769. The hill overlooked many of the events associated with Cook's arrival and has since become one of New Zealand's most significant commemorative landscapes.

=== Titirangi Domain ===
During the twentieth century, land surrounding Titirangi was progressively assembled by the Gisborne Returned Services' Association for preservation as a public reserve. In October 1949, 68½ acres surrounding the former pā were formally transferred to a domain authority, creating the Titirangi Domain. The project was made possible through the donation and purchase of land interests, including those contributed by the families of Heni Materoa Carroll and Pare Keiha.

Speaking on behalf of the Māori owners, Reta Keiha described Titirangi as a place of longstanding cultural importance:

"This is historic ground on which we stand. It was in olden times the gathering-place and the school of those whom our people selected for training in leadership."

— Reta Keiha, 1949

Keiha stated that his family had supported the transfer in the expectation that the historic landscape would be permanently preserved:

"When my family agreed to entrust disposal of this land to the Gisborne Returned Services Association, it was in full confidence that their trust would be honoured. The step now taken to preserve the area in perpetuity for the public use has the full approval of our people."

— Reta Keiha, 1949

The transfer established protections over the former pā site and ensured that Titirangi would be preserved as a public reserve while recognising its enduring cultural and historical significance.

== Reserve ==
Today Titirangi forms a 33-hectare (82-acre) historic reserve administered by the Gisborne District Council. The reserve contains the Cook Monument, the James Cook Observatory, walking tracks, scenic lookouts overlooking Poverty Bay and central Gisborne, a pōhutukawa planted by Diana, Princess of Wales, a World War II gun emplacement, and areas of regenerating native vegetation.

At the foot of Titirangi is Te Poho-o-Rawiri Marae, one of the principal marae of Tūranganui-a-Kiwa. Under the Maori Purposes Act 1970, the marae was constituted as a Māori reservation for the common use and benefit of Ngāti Oneone, Ngāti Porou (and its constituent hapū), Rongowhakaata, Te Aitanga-a-Māhaki and Ngāi Tāmanuhiri.
