= Riperata Kahutia =

Rangatira and landowner

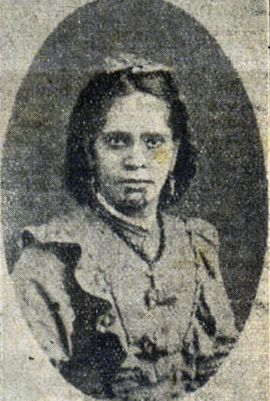
- Born: Riperata Kahutia; 1838/1839; Tūranganui-a-Kiwa
- Died: 10 June 1887; Tūranganui-a-Kiwa
- Occupation: Rangatira
- Spouse: Mikaere Turangi
- Children: Heni Materoa (daughter), Mikaere Pare Keiha (son)
- Parent(s): Kahutia (father), Uaia (mother)
- Relatives: Reta Keiha (Grandson)

Riperata Kahutia (c. 1838/1839 – 10 June 1887) was a Māori rangatira, landowner and political leader of Te Aitanga-a-Māhaki and Rongowhakaata through her hapū, Te Whānau-a-Iwi and Ngāi Tāwhiri. During the second half of the nineteenth century she emerged as one of the foremost Māori leaders of Tūranganui-a-Kiwa, exercising considerable political influence through her defence of customary land rights, leadership in the Native Land Court, and stewardship of tribal affairs during the rapid expansion of colonial settlement.

Although remembered principally for her extensive involvement in Native Land Court proceedings, Kahutia's leadership extended beyond litigation. She inherited the political responsibilities of her father Kahutia, became one of the largest Māori landowners in Poverty Bay, directed the management and leasing of tribal estates, helped establish Te Poho-o-Materoa at Awapuni, and exercised customary authority over both Māori and European communities. She is regarded as one of the most significant Māori women leaders of nineteenth-century Tūranganui-a-Kiwa.

== Early life ==
Kahutia was born at either Makauri or Taruheru, near present-day Gisborne, probably in 1838 or 1839. She descended from the leading chiefly lines of Te Aitanga-a-Māhaki, Rongowhakaata and Te Aitanga-a-Hauiti. Her father, Kahutia, was among the principal rangatira of Tūranganui-a-Kiwa and led the local repudiation movement against questionable European land purchases during the 1850s.

In evidence before the Native Land Court during the 1885 Kaiti rehearing, Kahutia described her own tribal affiliations:

"...my two hapū's are Whānau a Iwi and Ngāi Tāwhiri; Whānau a Iwi came from Nonoi and Ngāi Tāwhiri come from Kahunoke."

Raised within one of the district's foremost chiefly households, she inherited extensive customary land interests together with the political responsibilities associated with rangatiratanga. According to Shelley Nikora, her upbringing combined traditional chiefly education with literacy and familiarity with European institutions, preparing her to exercise leadership during a period of profound political and social change.

Kahutia lived during a period in which European settlement transformed Tūranganui-a-Kiwa and profoundly altered patterns of land ownership. Throughout her appearances before the Native Land Court, she consistently maintained that the customary rights of her people had endured from the time of their ancestors despite these changes, stating:

"The land has been in our possession from the time of our ancestors until now."

She married Mīkaere Tūrangi, son of the Rongowhakaata chief Paratene Tūrangi (Pōtoti), one of the Tūranga signatories of the Treaty of Waitangi. Their marriage strengthened relationships between prominent chiefly families in the district. They had three children, including Heni Materoa, later Lady Carroll through her marriage to Sir James Carroll.

== Political leadership ==
Following the death of her father about 1860, Kahutia assumed a leading political role within Te Aitanga-a-Māhaki and its associated hapū. During the Pai Mārire conflicts of 1865 she aligned with government-supporting Māori communities, and a British flag was flown above her pā at Waikanae as a public indication of that position.

Unlike many nineteenth-century Māori leaders whose authority rested primarily upon warfare, Kahutia became recognised for diplomacy, legal advocacy and administration. She exercised customary authority while simultaneously engaging with colonial political institutions, allowing her to influence both Māori and government decision-making in Poverty Bay.

Her reputation extended well beyond her own iwi. Numerous owners entrusted her with representing their interests before the Native Land Court, reflecting widespread confidence in her knowledge of whakapapa, customary tenure and tribal history.

== Native Land Court and land interests ==
Kahutia became one of the most prominent Māori advocates before the Native Land Court in Poverty Bay. Over several decades she appeared in numerous investigations of title involving some of the district's most valuable land blocks, frequently acting not only on her own behalf but also for wider groups of owners.

Among her most significant successes were the confirmation of Te Whānau-a-Iwi interests in the Awapuni and Kaitī blocks and the defence of customary rights against competing tribal claims. Contemporary observers repeatedly commented upon her command of whakapapa and customary history, describing her evidence as unusually clear and persuasive.

She was also among the principal owners of Tūranganui No. 2, part of which was sold to establish the township of Gisborne. During negotiations she successfully insisted upon alterations to the southern boundary so that Waikanae Creek and associated fisheries remained in Māori ownership.

Rather than rejecting the Native Land Court outright, Kahutia sought to use it strategically to secure legal recognition of customary title. Alongside litigation she developed extensive leasing arrangements with European farmers and businessmen, enabling Māori owners to derive income while retaining ownership of significant areas of land.

== Kaiti Block ==
The Kaiti block occupied a central place in Kahutia's public career and became the defining Native Land Court litigation of her life. Lasting more than a decade, the proceedings established her reputation as one of Tūranganui-a-Kiwa's foremost Māori advocates and required her to present extensive evidence concerning whakapapa, customary tenure and the history of occupation in the district.

The litigation concerned ownership of approximately 4,350 acres encompassing much of present-day Kaiti. Although the competing parties traced descent from the common ancestors Kahunoke and Te Nonoi-i-Kura, great-grandchildren of Ruapani, the principal issue before the Court was not whakapapa itself but the relative customary rights that had arisen through occupation, conflict and the continued exercise of authority over different parts of the block.

The Kaiti title was first lodged before the Native Land Court in 1868, although proceedings were delayed because of a defect in the survey. The claim returned to the Court in 1870 and was first substantively investigated in November 1873, when Kahutia first appeared before the Native Land Court in November 1873, claiming the western portion of Kaiti on behalf of Te Whānau-a-Iwi through ancestry, conquest and continuous occupation. She maintained that the land extending from Otipi to the Waimata River had remained under the customary authority of her ancestors from the time of Kuriwahanui and Te Māanga to her own generation.

The investigation became a contest between Kahutia and a party led by Rutene Te Eke and Hirini Te Kani. Both sides accepted their shared descent from Kahunoke and Te Nonoi-i-Kura but disagreed fundamentally over the historical consequences of warfare, occupation and customary boundaries for ownership of the block.

Following an initial investigation in 1873, the case returned repeatedly to the Court. In 1883 Judge Brookfield attempted to resolve the dispute by encouraging agreement between the parties before ordering a territorial subdivision. Continued disagreement resulted in a rehearing before Chief Judge J. E. Macdonald and Judge E. M. Williams in 1885, with further proceedings during 1886 to implement the Court's decision and allocate individual interests.

During the rehearing Kahutia gave extensive evidence concerning the whakapapa, occupation and customary history of Kaiti. She maintained that although her ancestors had at times been displaced by conflict, they had subsequently returned to Kaiti, reaffirmed the customary boundaries established by Kuriwahanui, resumed occupation, maintained cultivations, burial grounds and rāhui, and continued to exercise authority through activities such as the establishment of the Papawhariki and Waikahua whaling stations by her father, Kahutia.

She rejected arguments that her family's customary interests had been extinguished by conquest, arguing instead that they had been reaffirmed through renewed occupation. Although she acknowledged whakapapa connections throughout the block, she deliberately confined her claim to the western portion in accordance with the traditional boundaries recognised by her ancestors. During cross-examination she further testified that her father had established rāhui over Kaiti, received rents from the Papawhariki whaling station, and commenced Native Land Court proceedings after being excluded from leasing arrangements negotiated by Rutene Te Eke and his associates.

The Court ultimately confirmed the competing customary interests of both parties. Kahutia and her people were awarded approximately one-third of Kaiti, including the western portion adjoining the Turanganui River and harbour, while the remaining two-thirds were awarded to the descendants of Hirini Te Kani. The lands recognised in Kahutia's award included the area surrounding present-day Tītirangi, Te Toka-a-Taiao and part of the Gisborne harbour.

== Community leadership ==
Kahutia's influence extended beyond land matters into the social, cultural and economic life of Tūranganui-a-Kiwa. In addition to her leadership in the Native Land Court, she acted as an adviser, trustee and kaiwhakahaere for numerous Māori communities. Nikora argues that her rangatiratanga reflected a broad conception of leadership encompassing the stewardship of tribal resources, hospitality, the preservation of whakapapa and tribal knowledge, and the welfare of her people.

About 1881, Kahutia joined Noa Whakaatere and Hape Kiniha in establishing a new marae at Awapuni. Acting on the wishes of Ngāi Te Kete, she commissioned the construction of its principal meeting house, Te Poho o Materoa, which was completed in 1884.

The tāhuhu (ridgepole) of the meeting house was presented by Te Heuheu Tūkino IV of Ngāti Tūwharetoa, symbolising the close relationship between the two tribal communities. Several of the principal carvers came from Waipiro Bay, while Rongowhakaata carvers also participated in the work, including Rāniera Tūroa (also known as Rāniera Tūroa Te Heuheu).

Following its completion, Te Poho o Materoa became an important centre for Rongowhakaata and neighbouring communities, reflecting Kahutia's wider commitment to strengthening the social and cultural institutions of her people during a period of profound colonial change.

== Death ==
Kahutia contracted tuberculosis during the 1880s. Following the death of her husband in about 1886, she spent her final months at the home of her daughter, Hēni Materoa, at Whatatūpoko, where she died on 10 June 1887, aged about 48.

Her tangihanga was held several days later and the funeral service was conducted by Archdeacon Leonard Williams. Despite poor weather and difficult road conditions, large numbers of mourners attended. In accordance with Māori mourning custom, many of those present cropped their hair as a sign of grief.

She was buried, in accordance with her own wishes, on family land beside the Taruheru River among her relatives. Contemporary reports noted that her coffin, decorated internally with artificial flowers and fitted with a glass viewing panel, was placed within a brick vault incorporating a second glass panel so that it could be viewed after burial.

In 1906, Hēni Materoa commissioned a memorial over her mother's grave at Te Kurī-a-Tūātai. The unveiling ceremony was conducted by the Reverend F. W. Chatterton and attended by Māori and Pākehā dignitaries, including Mayor William Townley and Colonel Thomas Porter. The monument bore the inscription:

He Whakamaharatanga Kia Riperata Kahutia i moe nei i te 10 o Hune, 1887. He Wāhine i Arohatia i Whakanuitia i tōna oranga, he wāhine pono, whaiwhakaaro pai, pono ki te Kuini.

The accompanying English translation described Kahutia as "a woman greatly beloved in her lifetime", "one of noble thoughts", and "a staunch adherent of the Queen".

== Legacy ==
Riperata Kahutia is regarded as one of the foremost Māori women leaders of nineteenth-century New Zealand. Her leadership coincided with the transformation of Māori society following the New Zealand Wars and the establishment of the Native Land Court. Through a combination of customary authority, legal expertise and political pragmatism, she preserved substantial tribal landholdings and helped shape the development of modern Tūranganui-a-Kiwa.
