= Raharuhi Rukupō =

Māori tribal leader and carver

- Other name: Lazarus Rukupō
- Occupations: Tribal leader and carver
- Notable work: Te Hau ki Tūranga

Raharuhi Rukupō (c. 1800 – 29 September 1873), also known by the baptismal name Lazarus Rukupō, was a Māori rangatira and tohunga whakairo from Tūranga, New Zealand. An ariki ihorei of Ngāti Kaipoho, he was affiliated by descent with Rongowhakaata, Ngāi Tāmanuhiri and Te Aitanga-a-Māhaki. He became recognised as one of the leading Māori carvers of the nineteenth century.

== Early life and leadership ==
Rukupō was born around 1800 in the Tūranga district, near present-day Gisborne.

He was the second child of Hinehou and Pītau Pohepohe. His elder brother, Tāmati Waaka Māngere, was an ariki of Ngāti Kaipoho and signed the Treaty of Waitangi in May 1840. Following Māngere's death, Rukupō succeeded him as a leading rangatira of Ngāti Kaipoho.

Rukupō became a prominent political and community leader in nineteenth-century Tūranga. Contemporary accounts described him as generous in hosting visiting parties and active in convening meetings for communal purposes. He was also noted for extensive cultivation of kūmara and wheat.

As a rangatira, Rukupō intervened in disputes to prevent armed conflict. During a confrontation concerning land at Matawhero, he and the rangatira Rawiri Hōkeke intervened between opposing parties and prevented fighting.

Rukupō was an early convert to Christianity and served as an Anglican lay teacher. He was associated with the establishment of the Anglican mission at Manutūkē and with the construction of the carved church Te Kotahitanga.

== Carving ==
Rukupō was trained in the Tūranga carving tradition and became recognised as one of the leading tohunga whakairo of the nineteenth century. He is particularly associated with Te Hau ki Tūranga, a major carved meeting house constructed at Ōrākaiapu in the early 1840s. The house was created by a group of leading Tūranga carvers under Rukupō's leadership and was dedicated to his elder brother, Tāmati Waaka Māngere.

Rukupō is also associated with the carving of the waka taua Te Toki-a-Tāpiri and with carving undertaken for the first Anglican church at Manutūkē.

No known photograph or contemporary portrait of Rukupō survives. A carved figure in Te Hau ki Tūranga has sometimes been identified as a representation of Rukupō, although the identification is uncertain.

=== Attributed works ===
A number of surviving works have been attributed to Rukupō or associated with his leadership as a tohunga whakairo. Attribution of exact works is complicated by the collaborative nature of major nineteenth-century carving projects, which often involved groups of carvers working under the direction of senior tohunga.

Works associated with Rukupō include:

- Te Hau ki Tūranga – considered to by the artistic "zenith" of the Tūranga style. The whare was constructed at Ōrākaiapu in the early 1840s. Rukupō led a group of approximately 18 Tūranga master carvers responsible for the house, which was later dedicated to his elder brother Tāmati Waaka Māngere.
- Te Toki-a-Tāpiri – a waka taua carved in Tūranga and associated with Rukupō and other leading Tūranga carvers.
- Te Kotahitanga – the first carved Anglican church at Manutūkē. Rukupō was among the leading tohunga whakairo involved in its construction.
- Te Mana o Tūranga – a meeting house at Whakatō Marae. Some carved panels incorporated into the house have been attributed to Rukupō or to carvers working under his supervision.
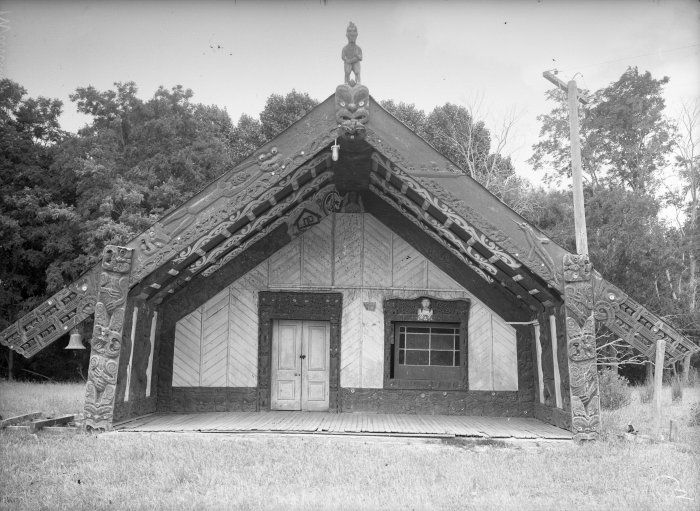

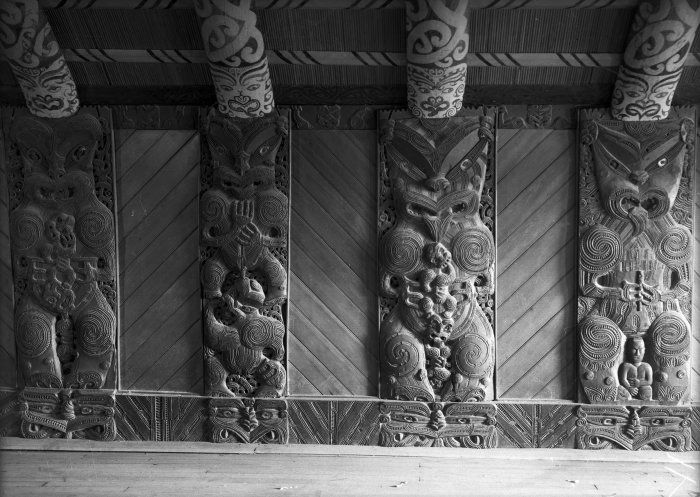
1910 exterior and interior of 1910 exterior and interior of Te Mana o Turanga, which incorporates carved panels attributed to Rukupō or to carvers working under his supervision.

Other carvings have been attributed to Rukupō on stylistic grounds. Rongowhakaata master historian Jody Wyllie identified particular features in works provenanced to Rukupō as characteristic of his work within the wider Tūranga carving tradition.

== Political activity ==
During the 1850s and 1860s, Rukupō became increasingly involved in organised opposition to the alienation of Māori land in Tūranga. By 1859 he was a leading figure in Te Rūnanga o Tūranga, which opposed further land sales and sought the return of lands previously alienated.

Rukupō was involved in negotiations concerning European settlement and land in Tūranga. In 1851, he supported a proposal to establish a town and attempted to persuade the people of his kāinga to agree. When most opposed the proposal, however, Rukupō informed colonial officials that no general agreement had been reached and that only a minority supported it.

His surviving correspondence also addressed disputes over land, grazing, trade and the conduct of European settlers. Although colonial accounts sometimes characterised him as hostile to European settlement, he intervened on several occasions to protect settlers and attempted to maintain peace during disputes between Māori and Pākehā.

In 1860, during a visit to Tūranga by Governor Thomas Gore Browne, Rukupō openly challenged colonial authority in the district. He later questioned government assurances that war was not intended while colonial military forces and supplies were being increased.

Rukupō was associated with Pai Mārire during the conflicts of the 1860s. Contemporary accounts nevertheless described him as using his influence within Pai Mārire assemblies to suppress armed conflict in Tūranga.

His son, Te Waaka Rongotū, was killed at Pākairomiromi in 1865. His apprentice and protégé Pita Tamaturi was subsequently captured and executed following the battle of Hungahungatoroa.

Following the fighting at Waerenga-a-Hika in 1865, Te Hau ki Tūranga was removed from Tūranga by colonial authorities in 1867. Rukupō protested its removal and sought the return of the house.

== Death and legacy ==
Rukupō died on 29 September 1873. In his final instructions to his people, he encouraged them to repair the church at Manutūkē, remain close to it, avoid debt and retain their lands.

Five years after his death, Rukupō's younger brother Pera Tāwhiti constructed Te Poho o Rukupō as a memorial to him. Rukupō's artistic influence continued through the Tūranga carving tradition, and Te Hau ki Tūranga became an important influence on later generations of Māori carvers.
