= List of places named after James Cook =

List of places named after explorer James Cook

This is a list of places named after Captain James Cook (1728–1779), the British explorer, navigator, and cartographer. Numerous geographic features, settlements, administrative divisions, and other locations throughout the world have been named in his honor following his voyages of exploration in the Pacific Ocean.

== Countries ==
- Cook Islands

== Country subdivisions ==
- Cook County, New South Wales, Australia
- Division of Cook, an electoral division in New South Wales, Australia
- County of Cook, Queensland, Australia
- Electoral district of Cook, Queensland, Australia

== Towns ==
- Cook, Australian Capital Territory
- Cooktown, Queensland, Australia
- Cook's Harbour, Newfoundland, Canada
- Mount Cook, Wellington, a suburb in New Zealand
- Cooks Beach, Coromandel, a town in New Zealand
- Captain Cook, Hawaii, United States

== Geographic features ==
=== Bodies of water ===
- Cooks River, New South Wales, Australia
- Cook's Bay, Ortario, Canada
- Cooks Brook (Newfoundland), Canada
- Cook Bay (Tierra del Fuego), Chile
- Cooks Anchorage, also known as Tautira Bay, Tahiti, French Polynesia
- Cook's Bay (Moorea), French Polynesia
- Cook Channel, an arm of Dusky Sound, New Zealand
- Cook Stream, in Pickersgill Harbour, Dusky Sound, New Zealand
- Cook's Cove, near Tolaga Bay, New Zealand
- Cook River (New Zealand)
- Cook Strait, New Zealand
- Cook Bay (South Georgia)
- Cook Inlet, Alaska, United States

=== Glaciers ===
- Cook Glacier, Kerguelen Islands, French Southern and Antarctic Lands
- Cook Glacier (South Georgia)

=== Islands ===
- Cook Island (New South Wales), Australia
- Cook Island, Tierra del Fuego, Chile
- Cook Island, Kiritimati, Kiribati
- Cook Island, South Sandwich Islands
- Cook Rock, South Sandwich Islands

=== Mountains ===
- Cook Mountains, Antarctica
- Mount Cook near Cooktown, Queensland, Australia
- Mount Cook (Saint Elias Mountains), Yukon, Canada and Alaska, United States
- Aoraki / Mount Cook, New Zealand

== Extraterrestrial features ==
- 3061 Cook, a minor planet
- Cook crater, the Moon

== See also ==
- Cooks' Cottage, Melbourne, Australia
- James Cook Observatory, Gisbourne, New Zealand
- James Cook railway station, Middlesbrough, England
- James Cook University, Queensland, Australia
- James Cook University Hospital, Middlesbrough, England
- List of commemorations of Captain James Cook
- Seventeen Seventy, Queensland, Australia
