= Titirangi (disambiguation) =

Titirangi can refer to:

- Titirangi, a suburb of Waitakere, Auckland, New Zealand
- Titirangi (hill), Gisborne, New Zealand, also known as Kaiti Hill
- Titirangi (New Zealand electorate), former New Zealand Parliamentary electorate
