= List of honorary doctors of the University of Waikato =

The list of honorary doctors of the University of Waikato below shows the recipients of honorary doctorates bestowed by the University of Waikato since its foundation in 1964.

Year	Recipient
1967	Lord Ballantrae
1968	Pei Te Hurinui Jones
1969	Arthur Nevill
1971	Donald Wilfred Arcus
1971	Denis Rogers
1971	Richard Bristowe Waddington
1979	Te Atairangikaahu
1979	Frank Bateson
1980	Jack Stanford Allan
1982	Henry Rongomau Bennett
1983	Henare Tuwhangai
1984	Ross Jansen
1985	Don Llewellyn
1986	Phyllis Guthardt
1986	Dorothy Jessie Stafford
1986	Rangimārie Hetet
1987	David Tompkins
1990	Norman Kingsbury
1992	Janet Frame
1992	Edwin Morgan
1993	Joy Drayton
1993	Donald Stafford
1994	Silvia Cartwright
1995	Eddie Durie
1994	Malvina Major
1994	Waea Mauriohooho
1994	Charlotte Rachel Anwyl Wallace
1995	Elizabeth Ursula Alley
1995	Wilf Malcolm
1995	Jenny King
1995	Te Huirangi Waikerepuru
1996	Kiri Te Kanawa
1996	Kāterina Mataira
1997	Peter Tapsell
1997	Hiko Hohepa
1997	Manuhuia Bennett
1998	Kevin Roberts
1998	Paul Woodford Day
1999	Doug Graham
1999	Koro Wētere
1999	Gerald Bailey
2000	Neil Finn
2001	Tim Finn
2002	Ida Gaskin
2002	Michael King
2002	Michael MacRae Hanna
2002	Hirini Melbourne
2003	Tui Adams
2004	Margaret Wilson
2004	David Gordon Edgar
2004	Caroline Bennett
2004	Apirana Mahuika
2004	Hare Wakakaraka Puke
2005	Te Wharehuia Milroy
2005	Margaret Mahy
2006	Ken Arvidson
2006	Jeffrey Alexander Jones
2006	Howard Morrison
2006	Bryan Gould
2006	Edmund Hillary
2007	Diggeress Te Kanawa
2008	Brian Richard Perry
2008	John Gallagher
2008	Bill Gallagher
2008	Ruud Kleinpaste
2008	Tīmoti Kāretu
2008	Tessa Duder
2009	Heni Sunderland
2009	Zena Daysh
2009	Peter Godfrey Scott Sergel
2009	Hamish Keith
2009	Wilson Whineray
2009	Lynley Dodd
2010	Max Martin Gibbs
2010	Margaret Bedggood Mulgan
2010	Roka Paora
2010	Jon Mayson
2011	James Judd
2011	Cathy Dewes
2011	Jools Topp
2011	Lynda Topp
2012	Campbell Smith
2012	Roger Hill
2013	Gordon Stephenson
2013	Bernard Thomas Crosby
2013	Susan Devoy
2013	Patrick Hogan
2014	Warren Scotter
2014	Dryden Spring
2015	Dick Tonks
2015	Morehu Ngatoko Rahipere
2016	Roy Crawford
2016	David Moxon
2016	Denis Browne
2016	Tūheitia
2017	Charles Daugherty
2017	Ian George Jowett
2017	Max Gimblett
2017	Helen Clark
2019	Derek Lardelli
2019	Jim Bolger
2020	Lisa Feldman Barrett
2021	Paul Hunt
2021	Wira Gardiner
2024	Paul Adams
2024	Te Ururoa Flavell
2024	Jerry Mateparae
2024	Tureiti Moxon
2025	Te Haumihiata Mason
2025	Anand Satyanand
