= Norman Kingsbury =

New Zealand educational administrator (1932–2019)

Norman Kingsbury CNZM JP

1st Registrar of the University of Waikato
- In office 1964–1988

Personal details
- Born: Norman William Kingsbury; 7 December 1932 Waimate, New Zealand
- Died: 12 December 2019 (aged 87) Hamilton, New Zealand
- Spouse: Barbara Anne Stephens (m. 1959; died 2001)
- Children: 5

Norman William Kingsbury CNZM JP (7 December 1932 – 12 December 2019) was a New Zealand educational administrator. He served as the inaugural registrar of the University of Waikato (1964–1988), and chief executive officer of the New Zealand Qualifications Authority (1990–2000).

== Early life, family, and education ==
Born in Waimate on 7 December 1932, Kingsbury was the son of Frances Emily Hall Kingsbury (née White) and George Ernest Raymond Kingsbury. He was educated at Waimate High School from 1946 to 1951, and then went on to study at Canterbury University College from 1952 to 1956, graduating Bachelor of Arts in 1955 and Master of Arts in 1957. He later completed a second MA degree at the University of Exeter in the United Kingdom in 1984.

While a student at Canterbury, Kingsbury became active in student politics. He served a term as president of the University of Canterbury Students' Association. From 1959 to 1960, he was associate secretary of the International Student Conference based in Leiden in the Netherlands, and then from 1960 to 1961 he was the body's secretary-general.

In 1959, Kingsbury married Barbara Anne Stephens, and the couple went on to have five children.

== Career ==
After returning from the Netherlands, Kingsbury worked in administration at Victoria University of Wellington, rising to assistant registrar, before being appointed registrar of the newly created University of Waikato in 1964. He was influential in the development of Waikato, particularly in relation to the development of a school of Māori and Pacific studies and the responsibilities of the university towards Māori, the development of and access to continuing education and distance-learning programmes, and the founding of the Waikato Students' Union. He served as registrar for 24 years, until 1988.

From 1978 to 1980, Kingsbury was registrar of the University of Botswana. As chair of the New Zealand Tertiary Education Advisory Commission from 1988, he was a key figure in reforms to the tertiary education sector, and was regarded as the "father of the student loans scheme". In 1990, he was appointed as chief executive officer of the New Zealand Qualifications Authority (NZQA). He retired from his roles with the Tertiary Education Commission and NZQA in 2000.

== Later life and death ==
Kingsbury was predeceased by his wife in 2001. He died in Hamilton on 12 December 2019.

== Honours and awards ==
Kingsbury was made a life member of the University of Canterbury Students' Association in 1956, and he was accorded a similar honour by the Waikato Students' Union in 1988. In 1986, he was appointed a justice of the peace.

In 1990, Kingsbury was conferred with an honorary doctorate by the University of Waikato. In the 2001 Queen's Birthday Honours, he was appointed a Companion of the New Zealand Order of Merit, for services to education.
