= Waiapu (electorate) =

Waiapu was a New Zealand parliamentary electorate in the Gisborne – East Coast Region of New Zealand, from 1893 (when it took over the eastern part of the East Cape electorate) to 1908.

== Population centres ==
In the 1892 electoral redistribution, population shift to the North Island required the transfer of one seat from the South Island to the north. The resulting ripple effect saw every electorate established in 1890 have its boundaries altered, and eight electorates were established for the first time, including Waiapu. By area, it was a large electorate. It comprised areas that had previously belonged to the East Coast electorate (which was abolished) and to the Hawke's Bay electorate (which shifted south). Its southern boundary was at the Napier electorate and it extended north to Cape Runaway. Settlements that were covered by the original electorate include Tokomaru Bay, Tolaga Bay, Te Karaka, Matawai, Gisborne, Wairoa, and Bay View.

In the 1896 electoral redistribution, the Waiapu electorate lost its southern area to the Hawke's Bay electorate, with the Mohaka River used as the new boundary. The settlement of Bay View transferred to the Hawke's Bay electorate. In the 1902 electoral redistribution, the southern boundary of the Waiapu electorate moved further north again, and Lake Waikaremoana, the settlement of Wairoa, and the Māhia Peninsula transferred to the Hawke's Bay electorate.

In the 1907 electoral redistribution, the Waiapu electorate was abolished, and the majority of its area became part of the Bay of Plenty electorate, with the balance going to the new Gisborne electorate.

== History ==
Waiapu was represented by one MP, Sir James Carroll, for all fifteen years. He had previously been the MP for Eastern Maori, and in 1908 he became the MP for the Gisborne electorate.

=== Members of Parliament ===
Key

Liberal

| Election | Winner |
|---|---|
| 1893 election | James Carroll |
| 1896 election | James Carroll |
| 1899 election | James Carroll |
| 1902 election | James Carroll |
| 1905 election | James Carroll |
(Electorate abolished in 1908; see Bay of Plenty and Gisborne)

== Election results ==
=== 1899 election ===
1899 general election: Waiapu
| Party | Candidate | Votes | % | ±% |
|---|---|---|---|---|
| Liberal | James Carroll | 3,153 | 62.10 | |
| Conservative | Cecil Fitzroy | 1,824 | 35.93 | |
| Independent | James Charles Dunlop | 100 | 1.97 | |
| Majority | | 1,329 | 26.18 | |
| Turnout | | 5,077 | 83.15 | |
| Registered electors | | 6,106 | | |
