= Campbell Smith (playwright) =

New Zealand playwright, poet and wood engraver (1925–2015)

Campbell Smith MNZM
- Born: Sydney Campbell Smith; 25 February 1925; Masterton, New Zealand
- Died: 13 July 2015 (aged 90); Tairua, New Zealand
- Spouse: Esme Isabel Dunbar (m. 1953; died 2014)

Sydney Campbell Smith MNZM (25 February 1925 – 13 July 2015), generally known as Campbell Smith, was a New Zealand playwright, poet, wood engraver and arts administrator.

== Biography ==
Born in Masterton in 1925, Smith was the son of Annie and Syd Smith, a signwriter. He served a trade apprenticeship, and then studied at Canterbury University College, graduating with a Diploma of Fine Arts in 1952, and then spent a year at Auckland Teachers' Training College. He married Esme Dunbar in 1953. After a period in London, the couple returned to New Zealand in 1956. Smith taught at Waihi College and then, from 1961, Fairfield College in Hamilton.

Smith was a wood engraver and printmaker, focusing on the life and culture of New Zealand. Subjects including rugby, farming, gum digging and Māori culture. His work is held in public collections, including those of the Museum of New Zealand Te Papa Tongarewa and Waikato Museum.

As a playwright, Smith wrote 24 plays, many of which are about notable New Zealanders, including Through Dark Clouds Shining about Ettie Rout; Mabel, based on the life of Mabel Howard; Frances Hodgkins: Painter about Frances Hodgkins; and This Green Land: Margot Philips - Painter, based on the life of Margot Philips. He was also a poet, and penned The Journey, a nativity story in verse, written in 1958 but not published until 2010, and which is illustrated with his own wood engravings.

Smith served as president of the New Zealand Federation of Film Societies between 1965 and 1966, president of the Waikato Society of Arts from 1965 to 1967 and director of the Waikato Art Gallery from 1971.

Smith was made a life member of the Waikato Society of Arts in 1994. In the 2003 Queen's Birthday Honours, he was appointed a Member of the New Zealand Order of Merit, for services to the arts, and in 2012 he was awarded an honorary doctorate by the University of Waikato.

He died at Tairua on 13 July 2015.
