= List of commemorations of Captain James Cook =

This is a list of monuments, commemorations, and memorials to James Cook.

== United Kingdom ==
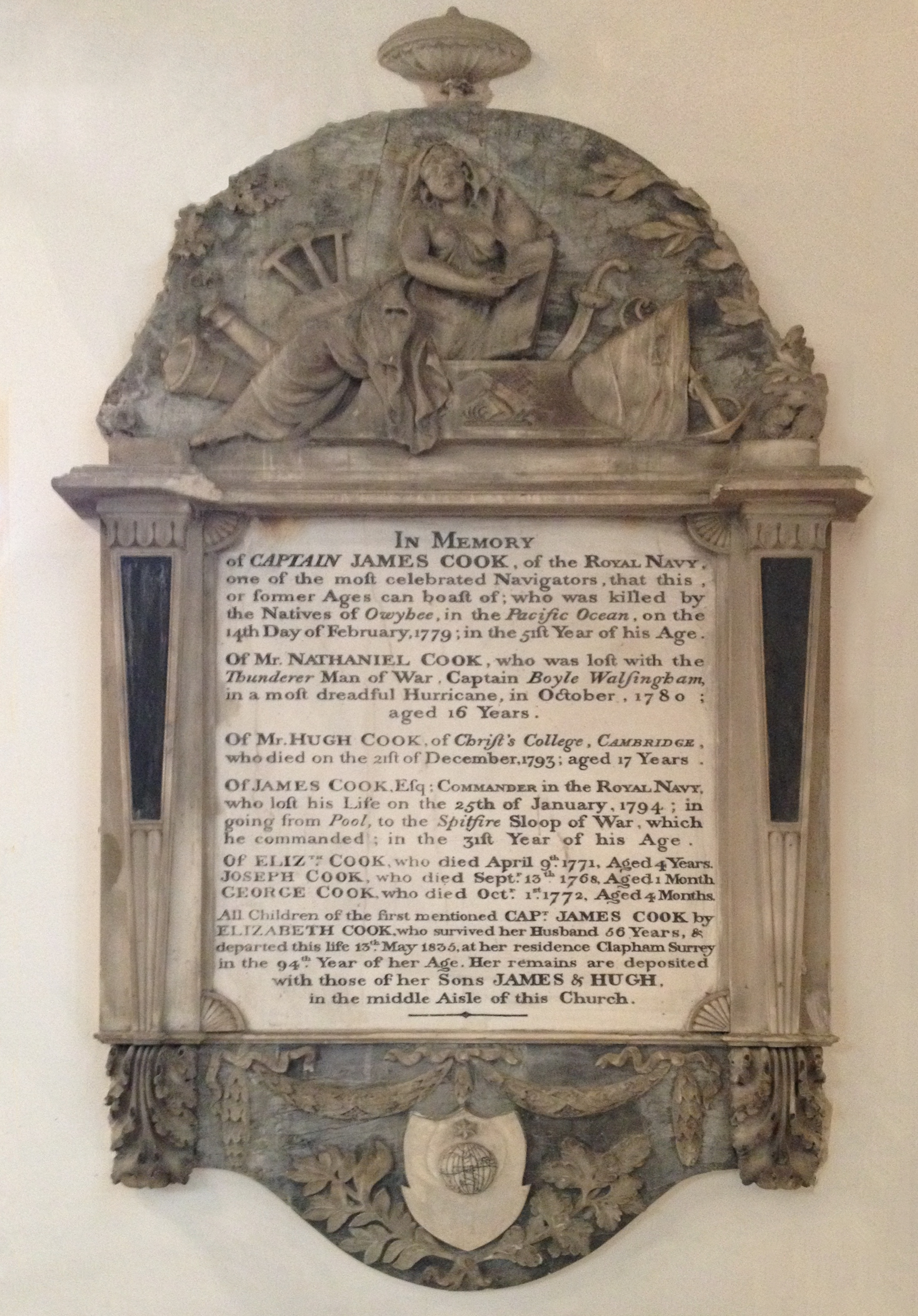
Memorial to James Cook and family in the church of St Andrew the Great, Cambridge.

- When news of Cook's death reached England, he was praised by newspapers, colleagues, and friends. (Note: Biographer Hough quotes an obituary that appeared in January 1780, which read, in part: "This untimely and ever to be lamented fate of so intrepid, so able, and intelligent a sea-officer, may justly be considered as an irreparable loss to the public... for in him were united every successful and amiable quality that could adorn his profession; nor was his singular modesty less conspicuous than his other virtues. His successful experiments to preserve the healths of his crews are well known, and his discoveries will be an everlasting honour to his country." Hough 1994, p. 364. Hough mistakenly attributes this obituary to The London Gazette. The quoted obituary is from "Obituary of Captain James Cook". The Norfolk Chronicle. No. 554. 15 January 1780. The obituary was published eleven months after Cook's death, when news of his death finally reached England.)
- One of the earliest monuments to Cook in the United Kingdom is located at The Vache, erected in 1780 by Hugh Palliser, a friend of Cook. (Note: The inscription on The Vache monument reads, in part: "The ablest and most renowned navigator this or any country hath produced... Cool and deliberate in judging, sagacious in determining, active in executing, steady and persevering in enterprising from vigilance and unremitting caution, unsubdued by labour, difficulties, and disappointments, fertile in expedience never wanting presence of mind... Mild, just, but exact in discipline... Traveller! Contemplate, admire, revere and emulate this great master in his profession, whose skill and labours have enlarged natural philosophy [and] have extended nautical science.")
- A large obelisk was built in 1827 as a monument to Cook on Easby Moor overlooking his boyhood village of Great Ayton, along with a smaller monument at the former location of Cook's cottage.
- There is also a monument to Cook in the church of St Andrew the Great, St Andrew's Street, Cambridge, where his sons Hugh, a student at Christ's College, and James were buried. Cook's widow Elizabeth was also buried in the church.
- The Navigators' Memorial in Westminster Abbey, dedicated to Cook, Francis Drake and Francis Chichester, was unveiled in 1979.
- The 250th anniversary of Cook's birth was marked at the site of his birthplace in Marton by the opening of the Captain Cook Birthplace Museum, located within Stewart Park (1978). A granite vase just to the south of the museum marks the approximate spot where he was born. (Note: Cook's hometown of Middlesbrough includes several commemorations: a primary school, shopping square and the Bottle 'O Notes, a public artwork by Claes Oldenburg, that was erected in the town's Central Gardens in 1993.)
- The Captain Cook Memorial Museum in Whitby is located in a building where Cook sometimes stayed during his naval apprenticeship.
- Also named after Cook is James Cook University Hospital, a major teaching hospital which opened in 2003, near to the James Cook railway station.
- The Royal Research Ship RRS James Cook was built in 2006 to replace the RRS Charles Darwin in the UK's Royal Research Fleet, and Stepney Historical Trust placed a plaque on Free Trade Wharf in the Highway, Shadwell to commemorate his life in the East End of London.
- A statue erected in his honour can be viewed near Admiralty Arch on the south side of The Mall in London.
- In 2002, Cook was placed at number 12 in the BBC's poll of the 100 Greatest Britons.

== Australia ==
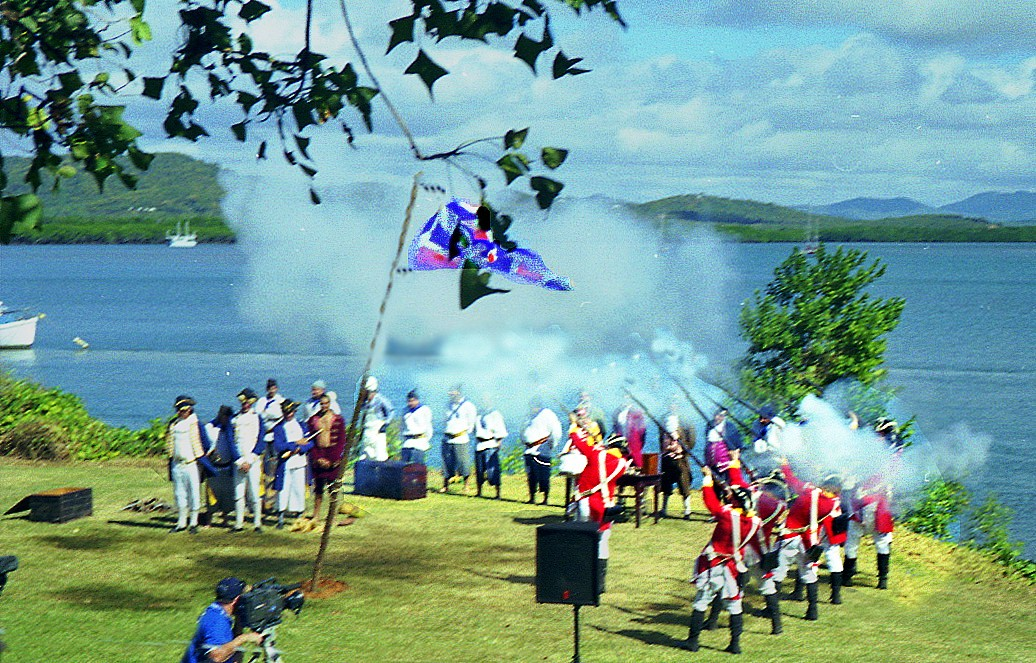
Annual re-enactment of James Cook's visit in Cooktown, Queensland.

- Cooks' Cottage, his parents' last home, which he is likely to have visited, is now in Melbourne, Australia, having been moved from England at the behest of the Australian philanthropist Russell Grimwade in 1934.
- The first institution of higher education in North Queensland, Australia, was named after him, with James Cook University opening in Townsville in 1970.
- There are statues of Cook in Hyde Park in Sydney, and at St Kilda in Melbourne.
- An annual re-enactment of Cook's 1770 landing at the site near modern Cooktown, Australia, has taken place since 1959, with the support and participation of many of the local Guugu Yimithirr people. The reenactments celebrate the first act of reconciliation between Indigenous Australians and non-indigenous people, when a Guugu Yimithirr elder stepped in after some of Cook's men had violated custom by taking green turtles from the river and not sharing with the local people. He presented Cook with a broken-tipped spear as a peace offering, thus preventing possible bloodshed. The reenactment is based on material from the histories of both the Guugu Yimithirr people and Cook's crew. Although the focus is always on reconciliation, the content evolves over time as the participants incorporate new ideas.

== United States ==
- There is a statue of Cook in Waimea, on the island of Kauaʻi commemorating his first contact with the Hawaiian Islands in January 1778.
- The site where Cook was killed in Hawaii was marked in 1874 by a white obelisk. The small plot of land surrounding the marker was purportedly deeded to Britain in 1877 by Princess Likelike and her husband, Archibald Scott Cleghorn. (Note: The legality of the deed – and subsequent related deeds – is in dispute.) (Note: The obelisk is now fronted by a low stone jetty bearing a plaque which reads: "This jetty was erected by the Commonwealth of Australia in memory of Captain James Cook, RN the discoverer of both Australia and these islands".)
- NASA named several craft after Cook's ships, including the Apollo 15 Command/Service Module Endeavour, the Space Shuttle Endeavour, and the Space Shuttle Discovery.
- There is a statue of Cook at Resolution Park in Anchorage, Alaska.
- A U.S. coin, the 1928 Hawaii Sesquicentennial half dollar, carries Cook's image.

== New Zealand ==
- The Cook Landing Site Historic Reserve is a national historic reserve in Gisborne located where Cook first set foot in New Zealand.
- A statute of Cook is located in Victoria Square, Christchurch and is registered as a category 2 monument.
- One of two planned ferries between New Zealand's North and South islands will be named after Cook (with the other being named after the Maori navigator, Kupe).

== See also ==
- List of places named after James Cook
