= Heni Materoa Carroll =

Māori leader and philanthropist (1852 or 1856–1930)

Hēni Materoa Carroll OBE
- Born: Hēni Materoa; 27 October 1852 or 29 October 1856; Makauri, Poverty Bay, New Zealand
- Died: 1 November 1930; Gisborne, New Zealand
- Resting place: Houhoupiko, near Makaraka Cemetery, Gisborne
- Other names: Te Huinga; Hēni Kara; Lady Carroll; Reira Kara
- Occupations: Tribal leader, land administrator and philanthropist
- Known for: Māori welfare, land leadership and support for Māori soldiers
- Spouse: Sir James Carroll (m. 1881; died 1926)
- Parent(s): Riperata Kahutia and Mīkaera Tūrangi
- Relatives: Kingi Areta Keiha (nephew)

Hēni Materoa Carroll, Lady Carroll OBE (1852 or 1856–1930), also known as Te Huinga, Hēni Kara, and Reiri Kara (a Māori transliteration of Lady Carroll), was a New Zealand Māori leader, land administrator and philanthropist of Rongowhakaata and Te Aitanga-a-Māhaki. The daughter of the prominent rangatira Riperata Kahutia, she inherited a position of considerable mana in Tūranganui-a-Kiwa and became one of the most influential Māori women on the East Coast.

Carroll participated in the administration of Māori land, supported churches, schools, sporting organisations and institutions for women and children, and became an important political associate of Āpirana Ngata. During the First World War she travelled throughout the eastern North Island raising funds for Māori soldiers and their dependants as a leader of the Eastern Māori Patriotic Association. She also assisted Māori communities during the 1918 influenza pandemic. For her charitable and patriotic work she was appointed an Officer of the Order of the British Empire in the 1918 New Year Honours.

== Early life and whakapapa ==
Hēni Materoa, also known from childhood as Te Huinga, was born at Makauri, northwest of Tūranga, now Gisborne. Sources differ over her birth date, giving either 27 October 1852 or 29 October 1856.

Her mother, Riperata Kahutia, was a leading rangatira of Rongowhakaata and Te Aitanga-a-Māhaki, and belonged to the Ngāi Tāwhiri, Ngāi Te Kete and Te Whānau-a-Iwi hapū. Her father, Mīkaere Tūrangi, belonged to Rongowhakaata and was the son of the rangatira Paratene Tūrangi, one of the Tūranga signatories to the Treaty of Waitangi. During the 1923 Pātūtahi Block inquiry Heni Materoa stated:

"...Paratene Tūrangi, was one of the leaders of Rongowhakaata while he was alive. My Mother was a leader under Ngāi Tāwhiri and Ngāi Te Kete, I took up their positions after they died."

Through both parents, Materoa was connected to chiefly lines extending across the East Coast from Waiapu to Wairoa. A whakapapa published by Āpirana Ngata traced her maternal descent through Kahutia and Kataraina Kahutia, and her paternal descent through Mīkaera Tūrangi. Her mother's status as a rangatira and specialist in tribal history placed Materoa within a family whose authority preceded its recognition by colonial institutions.

In 1865, during the political and religious upheaval associated with the spread of Pai Mārire in Tūranga, Riperata Kahutia and her people moved closer to the township and established Piripono pā beside Waikanae Creek. Materoa spent much of her childhood there. Although she received little or no formal schooling, she was educated within her whānau in whakapapa, tribal history and customary knowledge. Her childhood also coincided with a period of extensive Māori land loss. The developing town of Gisborne was established partly upon land acquired by the Crown in 1869, while Riperata spent the following years defending the remaining lands and rebuilding the social and economic position of her people.

== Marriage and household ==
Around 1880 Materoa met James Carroll, known in Māori as Timi Kara, a young interpreter and politician of Ngāti Kahungunu and Irish descent. Riperata initially withheld her consent to the marriage. This has been attributed to religious differences—Materoa was Anglican while Carroll was Roman Catholic—although Nikora suggests that her whānau may also have been concerned that a husband should match the status of a woman regarded as the puhi of her people. The couple left Gisborne by ship and married at the registry office in Wellington on 4 July 1881.

They returned to Gisborne near the end of 1881, living first at Matokitoki and later on Riperata's land at Waikanae. Following Riperata's death in 1887, her rangatiratanga was inherited by Materoa and her younger brother Mīkaera Pare Keiha. James Carroll entered Parliament that year as member for Eastern Māori, but Materoa generally remained in Gisborne rather than joining him in Wellington.

Materoa also defended her inherited interests through the courts. In 1900 she and her brother, Mīkaera Pare Keiha, commenced proceedings in the Supreme Court against solicitor H. J. Finn concerning the Kaiti estate of their aunt, Kataraina Kahutia. The case centred on a declaration of trust and transfers executed during the 1880s, which Materoa testified she had not known about until several years after Kataraina's death. The litigation formed part of her wider efforts to safeguard family land and clarify the administration of inherited property.

By 1881 Materoa had inherited interests in at least twenty-five Māori land blocks extending from Makauri and Waikanae to Tolaga Bay. In January that year an application was lodged before the Trust Commissioner recording a settlement under which Hēni Materoa (then Miss Kahutia) conveyed her interests in Makauri, Waikanae and twenty-two other blocks to her mother, Riperata Kahutia, in trust. The arrangement demonstrates that, while still unmarried, Materoa was already one of the district's substantial Māori landowners and that the administration of her estate was closely integrated with Riperata's wider programme of land management and protection.

The couple had no biological children, but raised numerous children from their extended family, particularly those of Pare Keiha. Their household was frequently crowded with relatives, visitors and people requiring assistance. Among those closely associated with the household was Materoa's nephew, soldier and tribal leader Kingi Areta Keiha. After the First World War the Carrolls built a substantial residence in Kahutia Street which became a prominent Gisborne landmark and a centre of hospitality.

Materoa was recognised visually and ceremonially as a woman of high rank. Contemporary portraits show her wearing moko kauae, a feather cloak and a huia feather. She was remembered as dignified, gracious and carefully dressed. Within Māori communities she was known as Hēni Kara or Reiri Kara, while Gisborne Pākehā increasingly called her “The Lady” after her husband was knighted in 1911.

== Tribal and land leadership ==
Materoa succeeded to substantial responsibilities in relation to land and tribal affairs. Much of her leadership was exercised privately, through kinship networks, hospitality and personal influence, rather than through formal office. The extent of her authority was demonstrated by accounts that she possessed sufficient mana to oppose the proposed return of Te Kooti's remains for burial in Poverty Bay.

She was also directly involved in the collective administration of Māori land. In 1899 Materoa and other owners petitioned the Native Land Court to incorporate the owners of the 3,680-acre Mangatū No. 3 block. The court accepted that incorporation would permit the land to be administered for the owners' benefit and ordered a meeting to elect a management committee. In 1905 the court named her alongside Wiremu Kōnohi, Ereti Tuketenui Amaru, Mini Te Kani and Houpara Kōnohi as a member of the committee responsible for administering the Kaiaua No. 2C block.

These appointments reflected a wider history of Māori women's authority in landholding and management. Historian Kirstine Moffat has identified Materoa among Māori women who sought to advance Māori interests through colonial political structures, while retaining their own bases of customary authority. Ngahuia Te Awekotuku has similarly placed Materoa within a continuing tradition of Māori female leadership grounded in whakapapa, whenua and the public exercise of mana.

== Philanthropy and community work ==
Materoa was a major benefactor of both Māori and the wider Gisborne community. She donated land and money to churches, schools, public facilities and organisations concerned with women and children. Her approach continued the pattern established by Riperata Kahutia, who had used her resources and authority to care for whānau and retain a viable base for her people.

Among Materoa's best-known gifts was land associated with the establishment of a home for children in Gisborne. The Cook County Women's Guild initially operated a crèche and children's institution, and a new building known as the Hēni Materoa Home was opened in 1913. The institution continued caring for children affected by illness, bereavement and family disruption for decades after her death.

She gave land for Awapuni School and supported numerous recreational organisations. These included the Kahutia Bowling Club and women's hockey, for which she provided the Carroll Shield for competition between Poverty Bay and Hawke's Bay. The closely related Kahutia and Keiha families also provided land for golf, horse racing, schools, parks and other public purposes.

The Carroll home was itself an important site of community leadership. Materoa welcomed political and vice-regal visitors, including George Grey and Viscount Jellicoe. Distinguished visitors were sometimes presented with valuable cloaks or pounamu objects from the Carroll collection. Her generosity extended beyond prominent guests: oral accounts recalled that she regularly assisted kaumātua, children, soldiers and families experiencing hardship.

== Political and patriotic activity ==
Although she did not seek election to Parliament, Materoa was an influential participant in Māori political life. She supported the career of Āpirana Ngata, chaired his Tūranga electoral committee during the 1914 general election and helped raise funds for Anglican causes. In March 1917 she formally opened the meeting room at Ngata's home at Waiomatatini.

From 1916 Materoa and Ngata campaigned for support for Māori serving in the New Zealand Pioneer Battalion, later commemorated as Te Hokowhitu a Tū. She became a member and chairperson of the Eastern Māori Patriotic Association, which raised money, food and other supplies for soldiers overseas and accumulated funds intended to assist them after their return. When local branches were formed, she served on the central steering committee and was president of the Ōmāhu branch.

Materoa travelled extensively through the East Coast, Hawke's Bay and Wairarapa, attending and addressing fundraising hui. Surviving Māori-language reports record her chairing major gatherings at which Ngata, Māui Pōmare, Peter Buck, Frederick Bennett and other leaders discussed the welfare of Māori communities and returned servicemen. In April 1919 she was one of the speakers at the great Gisborne hui welcoming the Māori contingent home from overseas service.

Her work was not confined to fundraising. During the 1918 influenza epidemic, Materoa encouraged Māori patients to enter emergency hospitals operated by Pākehā medical personnel and persuaded Māori women to assist as nurses. She subsequently helped wounded soldiers and their families during the difficult process of rehabilitation.

Materoa was appointed an Officer of the Order of the British Empire for her services to charitable and patriotic causes. The honour was conferred in the 1918 New Year Honours.

== Later life, death and legacy ==
Sir James Carroll died on 18 October 1926. Materoa's health and interest in public life declined following his death. She died at her Kahutia Street home in Gisborne on 1 November 1930. She was placed in the Carroll family vault at Houhoupiko, adjoining Makaraka Cemetery, beside her husband.

Her funeral was among the largest held in Gisborne. A large crowd lined the route to the cemetery, while the city band led the procession playing the dead march from Saul. Māori women wearing wreaths of willow received the casket at the graveside, where the service was conducted by Anglican clergy including Frederick Bennett, the first Bishop of Aotearoa.

At a crowded memorial service in Holy Trinity Church, Bennett described her as the “mother of our Māori people” and emphasised both her pride in her Māori identity and her efforts to improve relations between Māori and Pākehā. Robinson concluded that her influence had crossed racial divisions and that her mana was recognised by Māori and Pākehā throughout New Zealand.

Materoa's life represented the continuation of a line of female rangatiratanga inherited from Riperata Kahutia. Her leadership combined customary authority with strategic participation in colonial institutions, land administration, political organisation and organised philanthropy. The Hēni Materoa Home, the sporting organisations she supported, and the land and institutions associated with the Kahutia family preserved her name in Gisborne long after her death.

== Honours ==
- Appointed an Officer of the Order of the British Empire (OBE) in the 1918 New Year Honours for charitable and patriotic services during the First World War.
