= James Cook Observatory =

Observatory in New Zealand

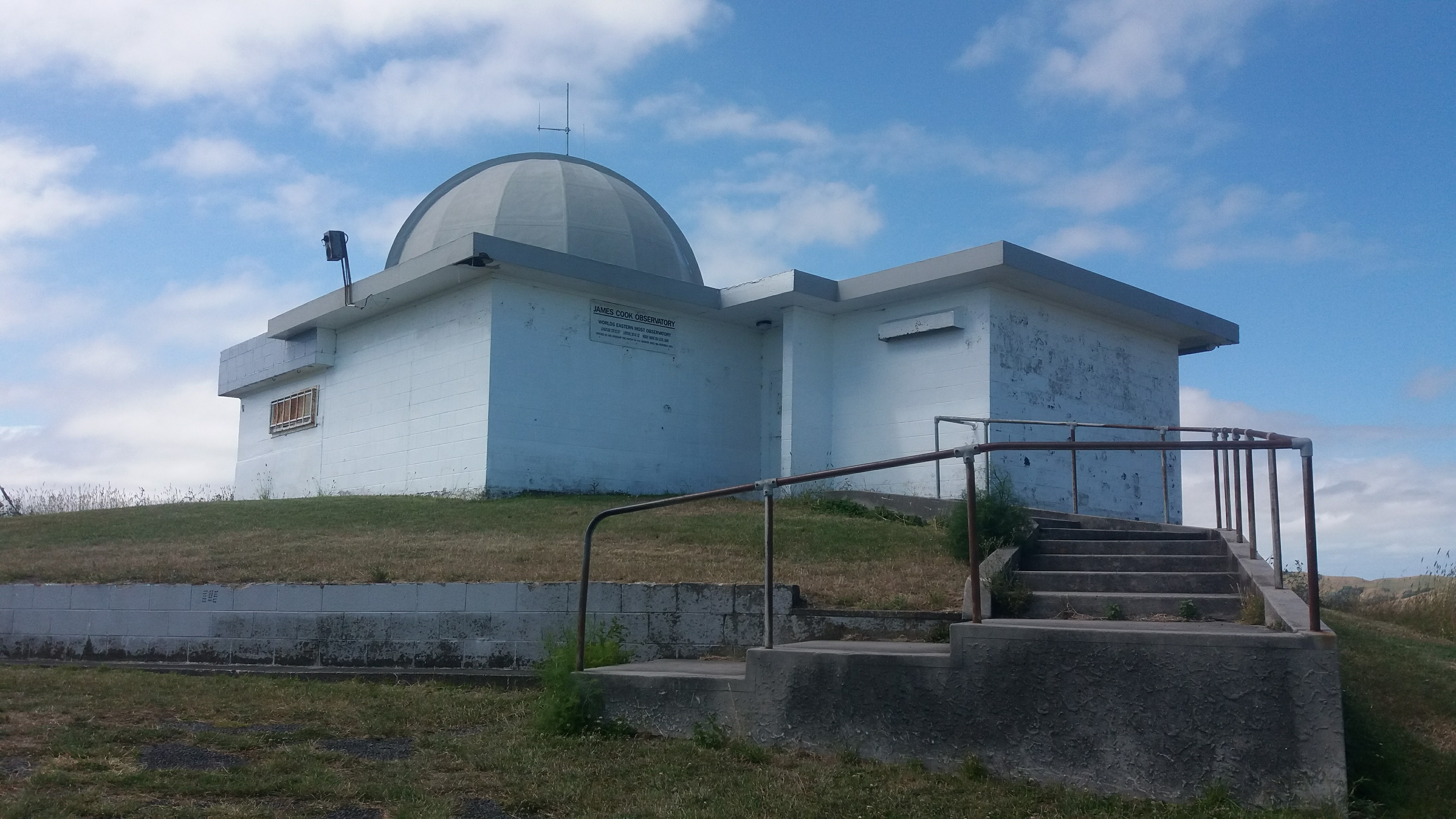
- James Cook Observatory in 2016
- Location: Titirangi Reserve, Gisborne, Gisborne District, New Zealand
- Coordinates: 38.6792°S 178.0315°E
- Established: 9 October 1971
- Closed: 2019
- Related media on Commons

The James Cook Observatory was the most eastern astronomical observatory in the world. It was located on Titirangi (Kaiti Hill), Gisborne, North Island, New Zealand. In 2019, it was demolished due to its structure being declared 'earthquake-prone'.

== History ==
The observatory was officially opened on Saturday, 9 October 1971, being named after Captain James Cook. The hilltop site was originally an observation post used by the New Zealand Home Guard during World War II to service the anti-submarine gun 25 metres south of and below the observatory. It was later extended and a 5-metre dome was added.
