= Ngāriki Kaiputahi =

Māori iwi (tribe) in Aotearoa (New Zealand)

Ngā Ariki Kaiputahi
- Iwi (tribe) in Māoridom
- Rohe (region): Gisborne

Ngā Ariki Kaipūtahi, Ngā Ariki Kaiputahi or Te Iwi o Ngā Ariki Kaipūtahi is a Māori iwi (tribe) in the Mangatu area of the Gisborne District of New Zealand. Its present-day members are all descended from Rawiri Tamanui.

The rohe (tribal area) of the tribe includes the Mangatu, Manukawhitikitiki, Whatatutu and Mangaotane Blocks, the Te Rata, Mangaotane, Waipaoa and the Mangatu rivers and tributaries, the Raukumara Ranges, the Arowhana mountain, and the Motu River on the boundaries of Mangaotane.

== History ==
=== Early history ===
Ngāriki Kaipūtahi is a sovereign tribe with its own lands, laws, traditions and form of government centered on an ancient pattern of Ariki (High Born) and Rangatira (leaders) of chiefly lineage. The origins of Ngāriki Kaipūtahi people claim a literal descent from the four Ariki (Lords) of the Heavens: Ariki, Ariki Nui, Ariki Roa, and Ariki Tawhito. Then when the Ariki descended to earth the lineage continued down through the children of the Ariki who are the earliest inhabitants of Aotearoa, pre-dating by some 500 years the contemporary concept of 'Te Māori', the Maori people, as connected to the major waka migrations of the "Great Fleet".

While there have been a few tribes descended from or recognizing the Ariki tradition, including Nga Ariki (of Ngati Apa), Ngariki Rotoawe (Turanga - no longer existent), Ngariki Po (Turanga - no longer existent), Ngāriki Kaipūtahi are one of remaining active tribes that holds its Mana Motuhake (authority) as direct descendants from these original peoples of Aotearoa called by various names 'Te Ariki', 'Moriori', 'Panenehu', and 'Turehu'. The Mana Motuhake is defined in its parts as: Mana Atua (Authority from the Gods) through the four Ariki; Mana Tupuna - an unbroken line of Ariki and Rangatira to the present day generation; Mana Whenua - undisturbed possession of the Mangatu lands for over 700 years; Mana Tangata - the present day tribal sovereign government.

=== Modern history ===
In its contemporary form, Te Iwi o Ngā Ariki Kaipūtahi consists of 51 whanau (family groups) organized around a central tribal government made up of three branches: Kahui Ariki (judicial), Kahui Rangatira (legislative), and Taua (executive), as established by a constitution on 29 January 2006.

The mihi (introduction) for the iwi is:

Ko Maungahaumia te maunga,
Ko Mangatu te awa,
Ko Rawiri Tamanui te tangata,
Ko Mangatu te marae,
Ko Te Ngawari te whare,
Ko Ngā Ariki Kaipūtahi te Iwi.

The mountain is Maungahaumia,
The river is Mangatu,
The people are Rawiri Tamanui,
The marae is Mangatu,
The (meeting) house is Te Ngawari,
The iwi is Ngā Ariki Kaipūtahi.

== Governance ==
Ngariki Kaipūtahi Marie Brown TQ has the right to have Governance over Ngariki Kaipūtahi and the 7th generation.

=== NgariKi Kaiputahi Whānau Trust ===
Ngāriki Kaiputahi Whānau Trust is recognised as an iwi authority for the purposes of the Resource Management Act, and represents NgariKi Kaiputahi Iwi/hapu in the resource consent process. It is a whānau trust, governed by six trustees representing six tupuna. As of 1995 was formed in the Maori Land Court Gisborne the trust is chaired by reference Maori Land Court Minutes.

iwi treaty Negotiator.

=== Local government ===
The tribal area of the iwi is within the territory of Gisborne District Council.

== See also ==
- List of Māori iwi
