= Rongowhakaata =

Māori iwi (tribe) in Aotearoa New Zealand

- Iwi (tribe) in Māoridom
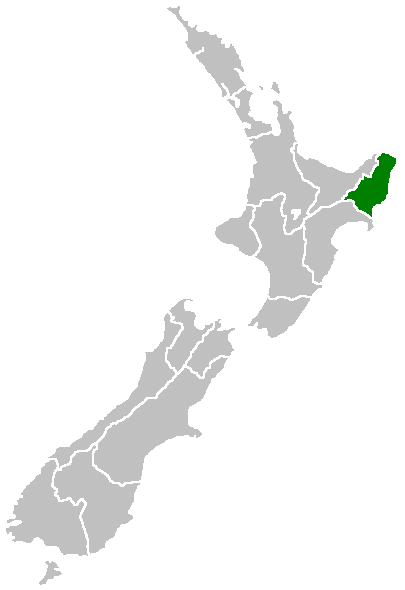
- Waka (canoe): Tākitimu, Horouta

Rongowhakaata is a Māori iwi of the Gisborne region of New Zealand.

== Rongowhakaata, the eponymous ancestor ==
The Rongowhakaata iwi takes its name from the eponymous ancestor Rongowhakaata. He was born at Ūawa, now Tolaga Bay, and was the son of Tūmaurirere and Haupūnake. His whakapapa included descent from the sons of Paikea, Rongomaituahu, Marupapanui and Pouheni, and from ancestors associated with the Horouta and Takitimu migrations.

Rongowhakaata later settled in Tūranga. He married three daughters of Moeahu and Koihu: Tūrāhiri, Uetūpuke and Moetai. His union with Tūrāhiri produced their only child, Rongomairatahi. His union with Uetūpuke produced Rongopōpōia, while his union with Moetai produced four daughters: Rongokauae, Rongomoeawa, Tāwakerahui and Kahukuraiti.

Through these descendants, Rongowhakaata established whakapapa connections across Tūranga and the wider East Coast. Moetai's daughter, Rongokauae married Tamateakota, a son of Kahungunu and Rongomaiwahine, while another daughter Kahukuraiti married Hauiti, the eponymous ancestor of Te Aitanga-a-Hauiti.

== Hapū of Rongowhakaata ==
Rongowhakaata comprises a number of hapū connected through descent and intermarriage. The organisation and identities of these hapū have changed over time. By the 18th and 19th centuries, several major Rongowhakaata hapū operated as independent political groups, with smaller hapū associated with them.

The main contemporary hapū of Rongowhakaata are Ngāti Maru, Ngāti Kaipoho, Ngāi Te Aweawe, Ngāi Tāwhiri, Ngāi Te Kete. Hapū identities and affiliations are not necessarily exclusive. Te Whānau-a-Iwi, for example, has affiliations with both Rongowhakaata and Te Aitanga-a-Māhaki and is closely interconnected with Ngāi Tāwhiri.

=== Ngāti Kaipoho ===
Ngāti Kaipoho descend from Kaipoho, a descendant of Rongomairatahi through Tūrourou and Whare-rau-o-te-tahinga. Kaipoho established Tapui Pā on the western bank of the Te Arai River and maintained a fishing settlement at Te Kōwhai, near Pakirikiri. He was killed at the battle of Taitimuroa and was later avenged by his son Te Aweawe.

Ngāti Kaipoho developed from the descendants of Kaipoho and his sons Hūkaipū, Mōkaiohungia and Te Aweawe. Hapū associated with their descendants included Ngāi Te Aweawe, Ngāti Rua, Ngāi Tūrehe, Ngāti Pakirehe and Ngāi Te Aringaiwaho.

The Tūranga style of Māori carving, also known as the Kaipoho or Manutūkē style, is particularly associated with Ngāti Kaipoho.

=== Ngāi Te Aweawe ===
Ngāi Te Aweawe descend from Kaipoho through Te Aweawe. The hapū traces descent through two ancestors of that name, Te Aweawe I and his descendant Te Aweawe II.

Te Aweawe I avenged the death of Kaipoho and subsequently occupied Tapui Pā. Although descended from Kaipoho, Ngāi Te Aweawe developed a distinct hapū identity and was recorded as an independent group during the 19th century.

=== Ngāi Tāwhiri ===
Ngāi Tāwhiri descend from Rongomaimihiao through her three children, Tāwhirimātea, Tūtekiki and Māteroa. By the 19th century, Ngāi Tāwhiri was recorded as a major Rongowhakaata hapū operating as an independent political group.

Ngāi Tāwhiri is closely interconnected with Te Whānau-a-Iwi through intermarriage, shared interests and leadership. Te Whānau-a-Iwi has whakapapa affiliations with both Te Aitanga-a-Māhaki and Rongowhakaata, and successive intermarriage strengthened its connections with Ngāi Tāwhiri.

During the Kaiti title investigation rehearing, Riperata Kahutia identified both Te Whānau-a-Iwi and Ngāi Tāwhiri as her hapū, tracing the former through Te Nonoikura and the latter through Kahunoke. Their shared interests were also reflected at Waikanae, where Te Maanga of Ngāi Tāwhiri was entrusted with the protection of a rāhui established by Konohi and with protecting Te Whānau-a-Iwi interests in the area. Heni Materoa Carroll was later acknowledged as a leader of both Ngāi Tāwhiri and Te Whānau-a-Iwi.

=== Ngāi Te Kete ===
Ngāi Te Kete developed from a section of Ngāi Tāwhiri associated with Rākaukākā and Papatū. According to one tradition, the name commemorates the collection of human remains following a battle near Ōhako. Kete made from prepared kiekie were used to gather and remove the bones of those killed, after which a section of Ngāi Tāwhiri adopted the name Ngāi Te Kete.

Ngāi Te Kete subsequently maintained a distinct hapū identity.

=== Ngāti Maru ===
The Ngāti Maru or Ngāti Maruwhakatipua hapū of Rongowhakaata descend from Tapuhere and Tahatū-o-te-rangi. Tahatū-o-te-rangi was a descendant of Rongomairatahi through Rongomaiwehea and Uenuku. Uenuku lived at Te Papa-o-Maruwhakatipua, where his house was known as Te Poho-o-Maru.

The descendants of Tapuhere and Tahatū-o-te-rangi became known as Te Ngare-a-Tapuhere. As the group increased in size, it later adopted the name Ngāti Maru, after Maruwhakatipua. Hapū associated with Ngāti Maru include Ngāti Hinewhanga, Ngāi Timata and Ngāti Ruatuwhiri.

Following conflict with Ngāti Kaipoho, Ngāti Maru left Tūranga and lived for a period in the Waiapu district. They later returned to Tūranga and reoccupied their former lands.

A proverb associated with Ngāti Maru is:

He tini whetū ki te rangi, ko Ngāti Maru ki raro. He tini ika ki te moana, ko Ngāti Maru ki uta.

=== Other hapū ===
Other hapū identities claimed historically by Rongowhakaata kin based descent groups included Ngāti Rongokauwai, Ngāti Ruawairau, Ngāi Te Ika, Ngāti Rua, Ngāi Timata, Ngāi Tūrehe, Ngāi Te Aringaiwaho, Ngāti Pakirehe, Ngāti Ruatuwhiri and Ngāti Hinewhanga.

Ngāti Rongokauwai descend from Rongokauwai, a child of Rongowhakaata, while Ngāti Ruawairau descend from Rongokauwai through Ruakōpito and Ruawairau. Ngāi Tūrehe, Ngāi Te Aringaiwaho and Ngāti Pakirehe developed among the descendants of Kaipoho.

Several earlier hapū later became associated with larger hapū groupings.

== Marae ==
Rongowhakaata has five principal marae in the Tūranga area.

=== Manutūkē Marae ===
Manutūkē Marae is associated with Ngāti Kaipoho and Ngāi Te Aweawe. The marae has two meeting houses, Te Poho-o-Rukupō and Te Poho-o-Epeha.

Te Poho-o-Rukupō is named after the Rongowhakaata rangatira and tohunga whakairo Raharuhi Rukupō.

=== Ōhako Marae ===
Ōhako Marae is located at Manutūkē and is associated with Ngāi Tāwhiri, Ngāi te Kete and Ngāti Ruapani. Its meeting house is Te Kiko-o-te-Rangi.

=== Te Kurī-a-Tūatai Marae ===
Te Kurī-a-Tūatai Marae is located at Awapuni and is associated with Ngāi Tāwhiri, Ngāi te Kete Ruapani and Te Whānau-a-Iwi. Its present meeting place is Whareroa.

=== Pāhou Marae ===
Pāhou Marae is located at Manutūkē and is associated with Ngāti Maru. Its meeting house is Te Poho-o-Taharākau.

=== Whakatō Marae ===
Whakatō Marae is located at Manutūkē and is associated with Ngāti Maru. Its meeting house is Te Mana-o-Tūranga.

== Post Settlement Governance Entity ==
The post-settlement governance entity for Rongowhakaata is the Rongowhakaata Iwi Trust, established to administer the iwi's Treaty of Waitangi settlement and assets under the Rongowhakaata Claims Settlement Act 2012. The trust is also a mandated iwi organisation under the Māori Fisheries Act 2004 and an iwi aquaculture organisation under the Māori Commercial Aquaculture Claims Settlement Act 2004. It is recognised as an iwi authority for the purposes of the Resource Management Act 1991.

The trust is governed by eight trustees, comprising one representative elected from each of the five Rongowhakaata marae and three trustees elected by registered iwi members.

The Rongowhakaata rohe lies within the jurisdiction of Gisborne District Council, a unitary authority exercising the functions of both a territorial authority and regional council.

== Iwi in residence at Te Papa ==
In 2017, Rongowhakaata became the eighth iwi in residence at the Museum of New Zealand Te Papa Tongarewa. The iwi and Te Papa co-created the exhibition Ko Rongowhakaata: Ruku i te Pō, Ruku i te Ao / The Story of Light and Shadow, which opened in September 2017 and presented the histories, taonga and contemporary creativity of Rongowhakaata.

The exhibition explored Rongowhakaata history and identity through more than 60 taonga, with themes including innovation, kaitiakitanga and the historical encounters that shaped the iwi. It remained at Te Papa until February 2022.

At the centre of the exhibition was Te Hau ki Tūranga, a nineteenth-century carved meeting house confiscated by the Crown in 1867 and later held by Te Papa. Ownership of Te Hau ki Tūranga was returned to Rongowhakaata through the iwi's Treaty settlement, while the meeting house remained at Te Papa during the iwi-in-residence exhibition.

== Media ==
=== Tūranga FM ===
Tūranga FM is the iwi radio station of the Tūranganui-a-Kiwa iwi of Rongowhakaata, Te Aitanga-a-Māhaki and Ngāi Tāmanuhiri. It is based in Gisborne and broadcasts across the Tūranga and East Coast regions.

== Notable people ==
- Raharuhi Rukupō – rangatira and tohunga whakairo
- Otene Pitau (1834–1921), tribal leader, adopted son of Raharuhi Rukupo.
- Wi Pere – Member of Parliament and Māori leader.
- Kate Wyllie tribal leader.
- Te Kooti Arikirangi Te Turuki – Māori prophet and resistance leader
- Riperata Kahutia – rangatira of the Ngāi Tāwhiri and Ngāi Te Kete hapū
- Heni Materoa Carroll – rangatira of the Ngāi Tāwhiri and Ngāi Te Kete hapū
- Heni Sunderland - Kaumatua, Kohanga reo advocate
- Rongowhakaata Halbert – tribal leader, interpreter, historian and genealogist
- Petera Te Hiwirori Maynard Trade unionist
- Tu Wyllie – rugby union player, All Black and New Zealand politician
- Arapata Hakiwai – New Zealand museum curator
- Meka Whaitiri – New Zealand politician
- Matahi Brightwell – Master carver and navigator.
- Matai Smith – New Zealand television presenter.

== See also ==
- List of Māori iwi
