= Wi Pere =

New Zealand politician

The Honourable Wi Pere
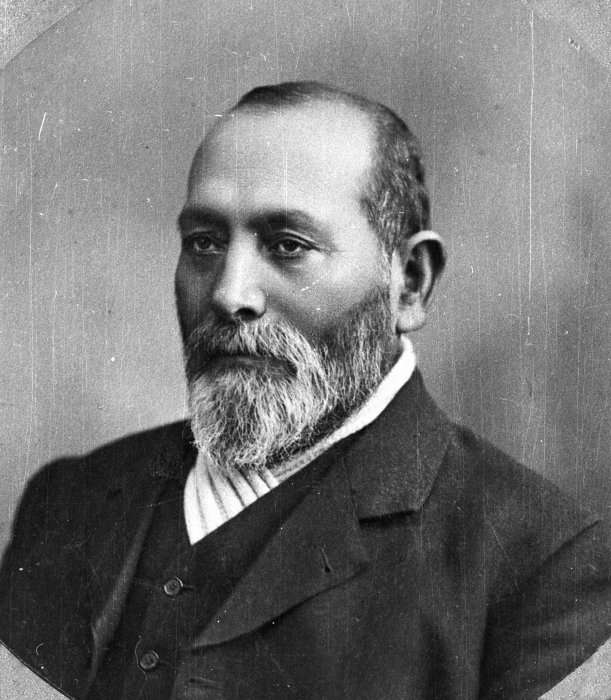
- Wi Pere, circa 1884

Member of the New Zealand Parliament for Eastern Maori
- In office 1884–1887
- Preceded by: Henare Tomoana
- Succeeded by: James Carroll
- In office 1893–1905
- Preceded by: James Carroll
- Succeeded by: Sir Āpirana Ngata

Personal details
- Born: 7 March 1837 Gisborne, New Zealand
- Died: 9 December 1915 (aged 78) Gisborne, New Zealand
- Party: Liberal
- Spouse: Arapera Matenga Toti (m. 1856)
- Relatives: Thomas Halbert (father); Rongowhakaata Halbert (grandson)

Wiremu "Wi" Pere (7 March 1837 – 9 December 1915) was a Māori politician, rangatira and land rights advocate. He represented the Eastern Māori electorate in the House of Representatives from 1884 to 1887 and again from 1893 to 1905, before serving in the New Zealand Legislative Council from 1907 to 1912.

Pere emerged as one of the most prominent Māori political leaders of the late nineteenth and early twentieth centuries through his advocacy for Māori land rights, opposition to government land policies, and leadership within the Repudiation and Te Kotahitanga movements. He was widely regarded as an influential Māori leader, a formidable parliamentary debater, and an outstanding orator in the Māori language.

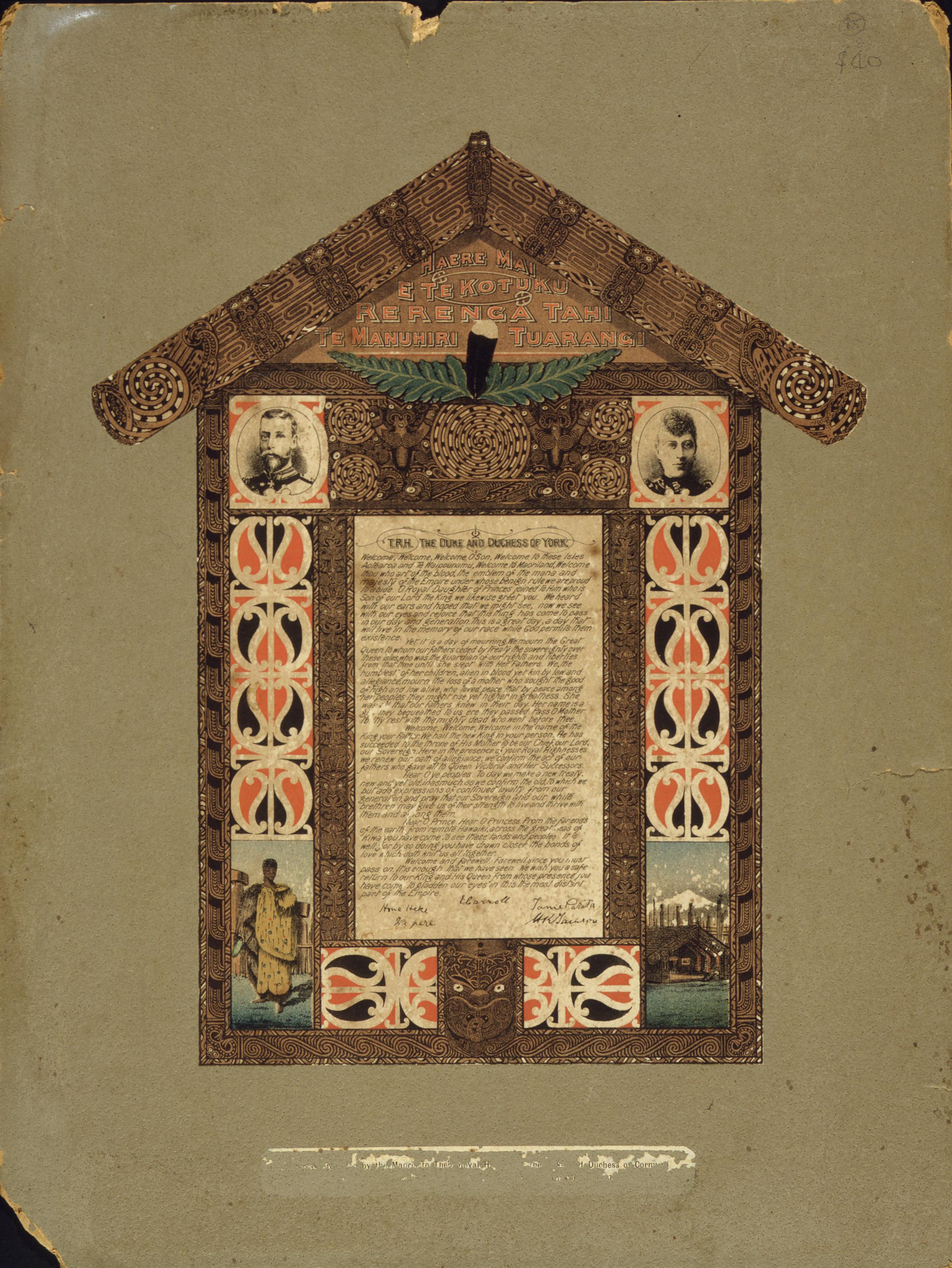
Condolences lamenting the death of Queen Victoria sent to the Duke and Duchess of York (1901).

== Biography ==
Wi Pere was born at Tūranga (now Gisborne) on 7 March 1837, the son of English trader Thomas Halbert and Rīria Mauaranui of Te Whānau-a-Kai, a hapū of Te Aitanga-a-Māhaki and Rongowhakaata. Baptised William Halbert, he became widely known by the Māori form of his name, Wiremu Pere.

According to tribal tradition, Pere displayed exceptional intelligence from an early age and was recognised by kaumātua as a future leader. He was raised principally by his mother and educated in whakapapa, tribal history and tikanga at the Maraehinahina whare wānanga by Te Aitanga-a-Māhaki elders. This grounding in traditional knowledge later underpinned his authority in land matters and his extensive participation in Native Land Court proceedings from the 1870s onwards.

Pere also came under the influence of the Anglican mission at Waerenga-a-Hika. Mission leaders recognised his leadership potential, and he became a member of the first standing committee of the Diocese of Waiapu.

In 1856, Pere married Arapera Matenga Toti at Waerenga-a-hika.

== Political career ==
New Zealand Parliament
Years	Term	Electorate	Party
1884–1887	9th	Eastern Maori	Independent
1893–1896	12th	Eastern Maori	Liberal
1896–1899	13th	Eastern Maori	Liberal
1899–1902	14th	Eastern Maori	Liberal
1902–1905	15th	Eastern Maori	Liberal

In 1865, as Pai Marire emissaries gained support in Poverty Bay and tensions intensified among local iwi, Pere remained loyal to the Crown and to the Anglican Church. Despite his support for the government, he condemned the exile of Poverty Bay Māori to the Chatham Islands and opposed proposals to confiscate Māori land following the conflicts of the 1860s. During the 1870s and 1880s he emerged as a leading figure in the Repudiation movement, advocating for the investigation of disputed land transactions and the protection of Māori land ownership. His prominence in these campaigns established him as one of the foremost Māori leaders on the East Coast and laid the foundation for his parliamentary career.

Pere was elected member for Eastern Māori at the 1884 general election, becoming the electorate's fourth representative. In Parliament he consistently criticised the operation of the Native Land Court, arguing that its individualisation of title undermined traditional Māori systems of collective ownership. He advocated for land to remain under the control of hapū and whānau and promoted measures that would enable Māori to administer and develop their own lands. He also became a prominent supporter of the Kotahitanga movement and its campaign for an independent Māori parliament.

Defeated by James Carroll in the 1887 and 1890 elections, Pere regained the Eastern Māori seat in 1893 after Carroll successfully contested the Gisborne electorate. Standing as a member of the Liberal Party, Pere served a further four parliamentary terms before losing the seat to Āpirana Ngata at the 1905 general election.

On 22 January 1907 Pere was appointed to the New Zealand Legislative Council, where he remained one of the few Māori members until 1912. During this period he increasingly identified with imperial causes, offering to raise a Māori contingent for service in the Second Boer War and advocating compulsory military training for New Zealanders. His appointment ended in 1912.

== Death and legacy ==
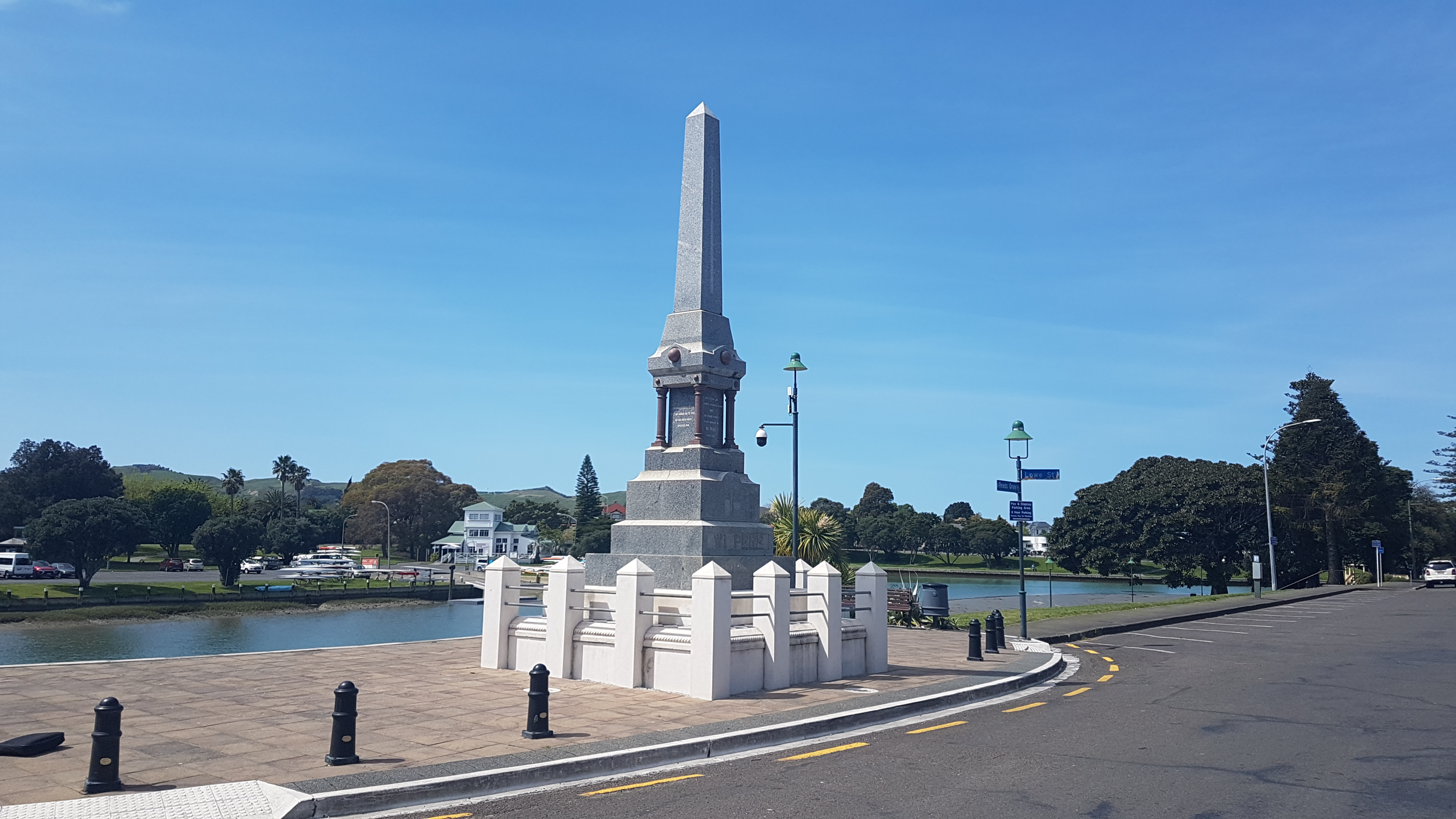
Wī Pere Monument

Pere died on 9 December 1915 and was buried in a vault at Waerenga-a-Hika on 3 January 1916. In his eulogy, Apirana Ngata declared: "No man ever did more for his people ... never was there a greater fighter for his race than Wi Pere".

On 9 April 1919, a monument erected jointly by the New Zealand Government and Māori was unveiled on Reads Quay in Gisborne by Sir James Carroll, coinciding with the return of the Māori Pioneer Battalion from the First World War. Speaking at the unveiling, Carroll described Pere as a lifelong adviser to Māori communities whose final public service had been to encourage Māori enlistment during the war, while Ngata praised his efforts to reconcile Māori and Pākehā interests in the development of Māori land, describing him as a leader who "stood head and shoulders above the people of his day".

Pere's descendants continued his public legacy. His son, Albert Pere, was a lawyer and served as a Petone Borough councillor from 1922 until his death in 1926. His grandson, the Māori historian Rongowhakaata Pere Halbert, became one of the foremost authorities on the history and whakapapa of Tūranga.

New Zealand Parliament
Preceded by Henare Tomoana	Member of Parliament for Eastern Maori; 1884–1887; 1893–1905	Succeeded by James Carroll
Preceded by James Carroll	Member of Parliament for Eastern Maori; 1884–1887; 1893–1905	Succeeded by Āpirana Ngata
