= James Carroll (New Zealand politician) =

New Zealand politician

The Honourable Sir James Carroll KCMG
- Timi Kara
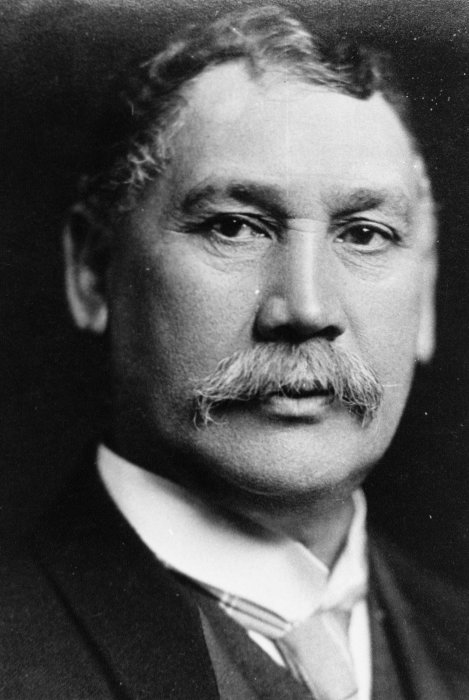
- Carroll c. 1914

Member of the New Zealand Parliament for Eastern Maori
- In office 1887–1893
- Preceded by: Wi Pere
- Succeeded by: Wi Pere

Member of the New Zealand Parliament for Waiapu
- In office 1893–1908
- Preceded by: New electorate
- Succeeded by: Electorate abolished

Member of the New Zealand Parliament for Gisborne
- In office 1908–1919
- Preceded by: New electorate
- Succeeded by: Douglas Lysnar

Member of the New Zealand Legislative Council
- In office 2 September 1921 – 18 February 1926

Personal details
- Born: 20 August 1857 Wairoa, New Zealand
- Died: 18 October 1926 (aged 69) Auckland, New Zealand
- Party: Independent; Liberal
- Spouse: Heni Materoa Carroll

Military service
- Allegiance: British Empire
- Battles/wars: Te Kooti's War

Sir James Carroll KCMG (Māori: Timi Kara; 20 August 1857 – 18 October 1926), was a New Zealand politician. Beginning his career as an interpreter and land agent, Carroll was elected to the Eastern Maori seat in 1887. He was acting colonial secretary (equivalent to the minister of internal affairs) from 1897 to 1899. He was the first Māori to hold the cabinet position of Minister of Native Affairs, which he held between 1899 and 1912. He was held in high regard within the Liberal Party and was acting prime minister in 1909 and 1911.

== Early life ==
James Carroll was born at Wairoa, one of eight children in 1857. His father, Joseph Carroll, was born in Sydney of Irish descent, and his mother, Tapuke, was a Māori woman of the Ngāti Kahungunu iwi. He was educated both at whare wānanga (traditional Māori college) and the Wairoa native school but left early to be a farm worker.

In 1870, while no more than thirteen, he was part of the Māori force pursuing Te Kooti in the Urewera, and his bravery was mentioned in dispatches. He became a cadet for the Native Department in Hawke's Bay and later in Wellington but was back on a farm by 1875.

In 1881 he married Hēni Materoa and they settled in Gisborne. The couple adopted several children but had no biological children.

== Political career ==
New Zealand Parliament
Years	Term	Electorate	Party
1887–1890	10th	Eastern Maori	Independent
1890–1893	11th	Eastern Maori	Independent
1893–1896	12th	Waiapu	Liberal
1896–1899	13th	Waiapu	Liberal
1899–1902	14th	Waiapu	Liberal
1902–1905	15th	Waiapu	Liberal
1905–1908	16th	Waiapu	Liberal
1908–1911	17th	Gisborne	Liberal
1911–1914	18th	Gisborne	Liberal
1914–1919	19th	Gisborne	Liberal

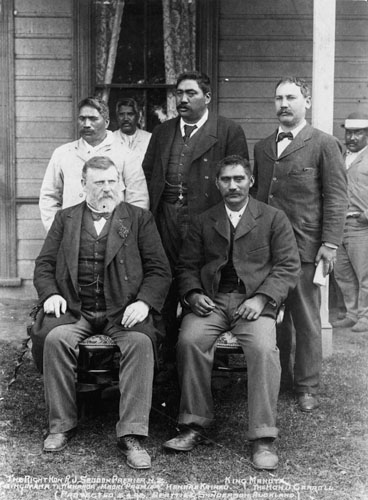
James Carroll (second row, far right). Front row from left: Richard Seddon, Premier; Mahuta Tāwhiao, Māori King. Second row from left: Tupu Taingākawa Te Waharoa, Māori Kingmaker; Hēnare Kaihau, MP. Taken at Huntly, New Zealand in 1898

Carroll first stood for New Zealand Parliament in 1884, unsuccessfully contesting the Eastern Maori electorate against Wi Pere. By the 1887 election, John Ballance's paternalistic Native Land Administration Act of 1886, which proposed leasing Māori lands through a government commissioner, was a major issue. Carroll, an opponent of the act, won the electorate. He was confirmed in the next election in 1890. In the 1893 election, he stood in the Waiapu electorate. From 1908, he represented the Gisborne electorate, until he was defeated in 1919.

Entering parliament, Carroll wanted to create equality for Māori by allowing them to lease land and use the revenue to invest in their own farms. The settler preference was for freehold title, and this solution was favoured by the Atkinson Government. He was appointed in March 1892 a member of the Executive Council representing the native race, and had to support the government in compulsory acquisition.

Te Kotahitanga Māori MPs criticised Carroll's stance, and he decided to stand for the General Electorate of Waiapu. He won this seat in 1893, the first time a Māori was elected to a general electorate seat.

Te Kotahitanga continued to promote a separate law-making assembly for Māori, and Carroll travelled to Māori communities speaking out against separatism. In 1899, he became Native Minister in the Liberal Government, the first person of Māori descent to hold this office. He established the Māori Councils Act, which allowed local Māori committees to deal with health, sanitation and liquor control, and the Māori land councils, controlled by Māori and which could sell or lease land.

The settler view was that much of the North Island under Māori control should be developed, and Carroll as Native Minister to 1912 was under pressure to allow more land sales. Many Māori consider that he made too many concessions, but he always fought for the rights of Māori at a time when there was little support for his views.

Twice in the Liberal Government, Carroll acted as Prime Minister, and his status was confirmed by the awarding in the 1911 Coronation Honours of the KCMG, becoming the first Māori to be knighted. Carroll continued to represent the general electorate of Gisborne until 1919, when he was defeated by Douglas Lysnar.

On 2 September 1921, Carroll was appointed to the Legislative Council by Prime Minister William Massey. From the Upper House of New Zealand, he was able to support Āpirana Ngata and other rising Māori leaders.

He died suddenly in Auckland from kidney failure on 18 October 1926. His body was returned to Gisborne, where he was buried at Makaraka.

Farmer and politician Turi Carroll was a nephew.

== Notes ==
New Zealand Parliament
Preceded by Wi Pere	Member of Parliament for Eastern Maori; 1887–1893	Succeeded by Wi Pere
New constituency	Member of Parliament for Waiapu; 1893–1908	Constituency abolished
New constituency	Member of Parliament for Gisborne; 1908–1919	Succeeded by Douglas Lysnar
