= Rongowhakaata Halbert =

- Born: 2 February 1894; Gisborne, New Zealand
- Died: 11 April 1973 (aged 79); Auckland, New Zealand
- Occupations: Interpreter, historian, genealogist
- Spouse: Patehepa Tamatea (m. 1915; died 1972)
- Relatives: Wi Pere (grandfather)
- Writing career
- Subject: Māori History
- Notable works: Horouta: The History of the Horouta Canoe, Gisborne and East Coast

Rongowhakaata "Rongo" Pere Halbert (2 February 1894 – 11 April 1973) was a Māori tribal leader, interpreter, historian and genealogist. He was considered "an eminent authority on Māori literature". Halbert's book Horouta: The History of the Horouta Canoe, Gisborne and East Coast, published posthumously in 1999, is considered a classic of tribal history.

== Early life ==
Halbert was born on 2 February 1894 in Waerenga-a-Hika, Gisborne, to Hetekia Te Kani Pere (or Halbert), a farmer, and his wife, Riripeti Rangikohera Ranginui. His grandfather was noted Māori politician Wi Pere. Halbert attended school in Gisborne up until 1911. He then attended Nelson College from 1911 to 1914, where he was a prefect and excelled at sports and music.

On 11 September 1915, he married Patehepa Tamatea and together they had seven children. For a time they ran a dairy farm at Pukepapa, near Waituhi.

== Career ==
Halbert became a licensed interpreter in 1915. His strong command of the Māori language combined with his knowledge of Māori literature gained him important roles such as assisting the New Zealand Geographic Board with Māori place names, and revising the sixth edition of H. W. Williams's Māori dictionary. Later he acted as an adviser on Māori texts for the Polynesian Society. Halbert was a founding member of the Gisborne Art Gallery and Museum in 1955, and the first chairman of the Maori Museum Committee, advising on the Māori collections.

As a historian and genealogist, Halbert contributed to John Hikawera Mitchell's Takitimu (1944), a record of the migration of the Ngāti Kahungunu. He also contributed to the Whakatane and District Historical Society's first memoir, Te Tini o Toi, as well as papers on the dating of Maori genealogies.

From 1940 onwards Halbert devoted most of his time to studying the history and genealogy of the East Coast iwi. In 1999 his book Horouta: The History of the Horouta Canoe, Gisborne and East Coast was posthumously published by Reed Publishing.

Poor health forced Halbert's retirement from the Maori Purposes Fund Board in 1968. He died at Lavington Private Hospital in Epsom, Auckland on 11 April 1973 and was buried at Taruheru Cemetery in Gisborne. He was survived by three daughters and three sons.

At the time of his death, Halbert was preparing a major historical and genealogical work. He left three main collections of papers: a manuscript called 'Horouta', 130 complete whakapapa charts, and a series of maps and historical data with iwi and hapū.

In 1953, Halbert was awarded the Queen Elizabeth II Coronation Medal.

Halbert's book, Horouta: The history of the Horouta canoe, Gisborne and East Coast, published in 1999, was listed in Books of Mana as one of the 180 most significant works of Māori-authored non-fiction.

== Publications ==
- Te Tini o Toi (September 1961)
- Horouta: The History of the Horouta Canoe, Gisborne and East Coast (1999)
