= Te Aitanga-a-Māhaki =

Māori iwi (tribe) in Aotearoa New Zealand

- Iwi (tribe) in Māoridom
- Rohe (region): Tūranga
- Waka (canoe): Tākitimu
- Website: www.mahaki.com

Te Aitanga-a-Māhaki is one of the three principal Māori iwi of the Tūranga district, the others being Rongowhakaata and Ngai Tamanuhiri. It is numerically the largest of the three, with 6,258 affiliated members as of 2013.

The rohe (territory) of Te Aitanga-a-Māhaki extends from the Mangatu land blocks to Hangaroa Matawai, Pātūtahi and Whataupoko near Gisborne. The boundary also includes Tuamotu Island. While majority of members are situated within the traditional tribal boundaries, there is a significant number present in the Wellington, Auckland and Hawke's Bay regions.

== History ==
The iwi is named for the ancestor Māhaki, who was a direct descendant of Toroa, captain of the Mātaatua canoe, of Tamatea Arikinui, captain of the Tākitimu, and Paikea. He probably lived in the late fifteenth century. Māhaki had his pā at Pāwerawera at Waikohu (north of modern Gisborne). He aided Kahutapere in his war against Tūpurupuru and Rākei-hikuroa. Later, he aided Tu-te-kohi in his war against Rakaipaaka and Hinemanuhiri. The result of these wars was that Māhaki received the land on both sides of the Waipaoa River, thus gaining control of all the land that had once belonged to the great chief Ruapani. His great-grandson, Tama-i-uia, fixed the borders of Te Aitanga-a-Māhaki at Puhinui in the west and Hinatore in the east.

== Hapū and marae ==
Te Aitanga-a-Mahaki includes the following hapū:

- Ngā Pōtiki, with Mātāwai marae, Tākitimu marae of Waituhi, and Tapuihikitia marae in Puha
- Ngāi Tamatea, with Taihamiti marae in Whatatutu
- Ngāi Tūketenui, with Parihimanihi marae in Waihirere
- Ngāti Kōhuru, with Parihimanihi marae in Waihirere
- Ngariki, with Māngatu marae and Te Wainui marae in Whatatutu
- Ngāti Mātāwai, with Mātāwai marae
- Ngāti Wahia, with Māngatu marae in Whatatutu, Parihimanihi marae in Waihirere, and Rangitira marae in Te Karaka
- Te Whānau a Iwi, with Tarere marae in Makaraka
- Te Whānau a Kai, with Ngātapa marae, Pākōwhai marae in Pātūtahi, Rongopai marae in Waituhi, and Tākitimu marae in Waituhi
- Te Whānau a Taupara, with Māngatu marae in Whatatutu, Takipu marae in Te Karaka, and Tapuihikitia marae in Puha

== Governance ==
=== Te Aitanga-a-Māhaki Trust ===
Te Aitanga ā Māhaki Trust is the mandated iwi organisation under the Māori Fisheries Act, the iwi aquaculture organisation under the Māori Commercial Aquaculture Claims Settlement Act, and the official iwi authority for resource consent consultation under the Resource Management Act. The charitable trust is governed by eleven trustees, representing each of the recognised marae, and is based in Gisborne.

The rohe of the area covers part of the territory of Gisborne District Council, which is both the district and regional council.

== Media ==
=== Turanga FM ===
Turanga FM is the radio station of Turanganui-a-kiwa iwi, including Te Aitanga-a-Māhaki, Rongowhakaata and Ngai Tamanuhiri. It is based in Gisborne, and broadcasts on 98.1 FM in Ruatoria, and 91.7 FM and 95.5 FM in Gisborne.

== Notable people ==
- Witi Ihimaera – writer
- Wi Pere – politician
- Te Kani te Ua – tribal leader, genealogist, orator
- Lisa Carrington – flatwater canoeist
- Tara McAllister -– scientist
- Elizabeth Kerekere – politician, activist

== See also ==
- List of Māori iwi

== Sources ==
- Mitchell, J. H. (2014). Takitimu: A History of Ngati Kahungunu. Libro International. ISBN 978-1-877514-72-2.
