= Georgina Stewart =

Science teacher and professor in New Zealand

Academic background
- Education: University of Waikato
- Doctoral advisor: Stephen May, Nesta Devine, Elizabeth McKinley

Academic work
- Institutions: Auckland University of Technology, University of Auckland

Georgina Tuari Marjorie Stewart is a New Zealand academic, and is Professor of Māori Philosophy of Education at the Auckland University of Technology. She is one of a small number of Māori-speaking qualified mathematics and science teachers.

== Academic career ==
Stewart studied chemistry at the University of Auckland, completing a Master of Science degree in 1982, followed by a Diploma of Teaching from the Auckland College of Education in 1991. She taught science, pūtaiao (science within a Māori framework), mathematics and te reo Māori in schools in Auckland and Whangārei.

Stewart completed a PhD titled Kaupapa Māori Science at the University of Waikato in 2007. She spent six years lecturing at the University of Auckland before she joined the faculty of Auckland University of Technology in 2016, rising to full professor in 2023.

Stewart has received two Marsden grants, the first a three-year Fast Start grant on "Maori-medium educational scholarship" in 2014, to research the use of te reo Māori for university-level teaching, scholarship and research. In 2021, she was awarded a full grant titled "Māori Flexible Learning Spaces (FLS) for supporting Mātauranga Māori and biculturalism in schools", an empirical study of flexible learning spaces in Māori-identity schools involving a national survey of schools, interviews and ethnography.

Stewart is a member of the Māori philosophy group, alongside Garrick Cooper, Carl Mika, Te Kawehau Hoskins, and Brendan Hokowhitu. The group describe themselves as "critical Māori scholars, thinkers and activists across several universities and disciplines, all interested in contributing to a more intentional discussion about, and practising of Māori philosophy, such as Māori forms of thought, critique and scholarship".

Stewart published the book Māori Philosophy: Indigenous thinking from Aotearoa in 2021, and was lead editor for Writing for Publication: Liminal reflections for academics also published in 2021. Stewart is co-editor in chief of the New Zealand Journal of Educational Studies, an associate editor of the Journal of the Royal Society of New Zealand and Educational Philosophy and Theory, and on the editorial board of Curriculum Matters.

== Personal life ==
Stewart affiliates with Ngāti Kura, Ngāpuhi-nui-tonu, Pare Hauraki iwi.

== Selected works ==
- Jandrić, Petar; Ryberg, Thomas; Knox, Jeremy; et al. (2018). "Postdigital Dialogue". Postdigital Science and Education. 1 (1): 163–189. doi:10.1007/s42438-018-0011-x. Wikidata Q108555339.
- Peters, Michael Adrian; Jandrić, Petar; Irwin, Ruth; et al. (18 June 2021), Towards a philosophy of academic publishing, pp. 3–37, doi:10.4324/9781003171959-2, Wikidata Q122359019
- McKinley, Elizabeth Ann; Stewart, Georgina (23 November 2011), Out of Place: Indigenous Knowledge in the Science Curriculum, pp. 541–554, doi:10.1007/978-1-4020-9041-7_37, Wikidata Q123455560
- Stewart, Georgina (2011). "Science in the Māori‐medium Curriculum: Assessment of policy outcomes in Pūtaiao education". Educational Philosophy and Theory. 43 (7): 724–741. doi:10.1111/j.1469-5812.2009.00557.x. Wikidata Q123455561.
- Stewart, Georgina (2005). "Mäori in the Science Curriculum: Developments and possibilities". Educational Philosophy and Theory. 37 (6): 851–870. doi:10.1111/j.1469-5812.2005.00162.x. Wikidata Q123455567.
- Stewart, Georgina (2020). Maori philosophy: Indigenous thinking from Aotearoa. Bloomsbury Publishing. ISBN 978-1-350-10166-1. OL 29482064M. Wikidata Q123458202.
