= Liz Jackson (educationalist) =

American educationalist (born 1980)

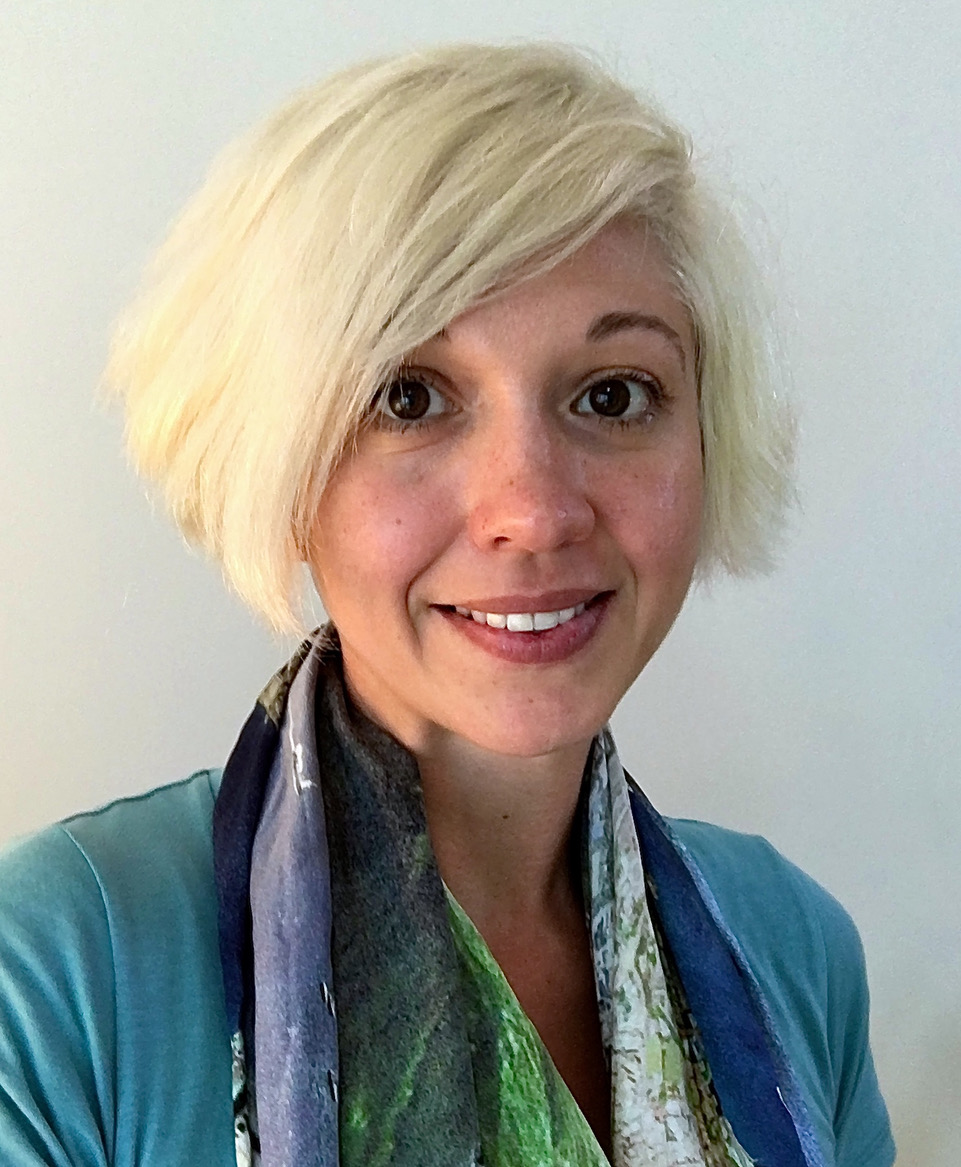
- Jackson in 2019
- Occupation: Professor
- Awards: American Educational Studies Association Critics’ Choice Book Award 2020, 2021, Philosophy of Education Society of Australasia Book Award,

Education
- Education: Portland State University (BA); University of Cambridge (MPhil); University of Illinois at Urbana-Champaign (PhD)
- Doctoral advisor: Nicholas Burbules

Philosophical work
- Era: Contemporary philosophy
- Region: Western philosophy
- School: Combines approaches from analytic and continental philosophy
- Main interests: Philosophy of education, ethics
- Website: www.lizjackson.org

Liz Jackson is an American scholar of the philosophy of education and educational theory. She is a professor in the Faculty of Education at the University of Hong Kong. She holds the Karen Lo Eugene Chuang Professorship in Diversity and Equity and serves as Associate Dean (Research) in the Faculty of Education. Previously, she was head of the Department of International Education at the Education University of Hong Kong. Jackson is also a Fellow and Past President (2018-2020) of the Philosophy of Education Society of Australasia (PESA).

University of Hong Kong

Jackson joined the University of Hong Kong in 2012 as an assistant professor and became a tenured associate professor in 2017. She served as Director of the Master of Education programme, was elected to the Comparative Education Research Centre management committee (2014–2018) and later became its Director, and participated in university committees on gender equality, diversity, and curriculum.

Education University of Hong Kong (2020–2023)

In 2020, Jackson was appointed Professor at the Education University of Hong Kong. She became the founding leader of the Virtues in Ethics East and West Platform, co-chaired the Women Researchers in Education Network, and led the Diversity, Equity and Social Inclusion Research Group.

She was appointed Associate Dean (Research) and Karen Lo Eugene Chuang Professor in Diversity and Equity.

== Research and Scholarship ==
Jackson’s first book, Muslims and Islam in U.S. Education: Reconsidering Multiculturalism (2014), examined how Islam and Muslims are represented in U.S. schools and argued for a rethinking of multiculturalism. The book received the inaugural PESA Book Award and the HKU Research Output Prize for Education.

Her second book, Questioning Allegiance: Resituating Civic Education (2019), explored how civic education is shaped by local, national, and global allegiances. It won the Critics’ Choice Award from the American Educational Studies Association.

Her third book, Beyond Virtue: The Politics of Educating Emotions (2020), analysed the politics of emotional education and received the American Educational Studies Association Book Award and the Outstanding Book Award of the Society of Professors of Education.

Her fourth book, Contesting Education and Identity in Hong Kong (2020), examined youth, civic identity, and protest in Hong Kong.

Jackson has also co-authored books on education in Tanzania and edited international volumes on ethics in higher education, race and racism, gender studies, and pedagogy. Her recent research addresses emotions and virtues, wellbeing, and cross-cultural ethics in education.

== Professional service ==
Jackson has held leadership positions in academic societies including:

- Editor-in-Chief of Educational Philosophy and Theory (2023–, with Marek Tesar).
- Editor-in-Chief of Philosophy of Education (2020–2024).

== Honours and awards ==
- Conferred the Karen Lo Eugene Chuang Professorship in Diversity and Equity (2025).
- World’s Top 2% Most Cited Scientists (Single Year Impact), Stanford University/Elsevier, 2021-2025.
- World’s Top 2% Most Cited Scientists (Career Long), Stanford University/Elsevier, 2025.
- Outstanding Research Student Supervisor Award, University of Hong Kong Faculty of Education. 2025.
- The Inaugural Maxine Greene Leadership Award, Philosophy of Education Society (North America). 2025.
- Outstanding Book Award: Beyond Virtue: The Politics of Educating Emotions, Society of Professors of Education, 2022.
- Fellow of the Philosophy of Education Society of Australasia, 2021.
- Critics’ Choice Award, the American Educational Studies Association, for Beyond Virtue: The Politics of Educating Emotions, 2021.
- Honourable Mention, the Philosophy of Education Society of Australasia, for Beyond Virtue: The Politics of Educating Emotions, in 2021.
- Critics’ Choice Award, the American Educational Studies Association, for Questioning Allegiance: Resituating Civic Education, 2020.
- Honourable Mention, the Philosophy of Education Society of Australasia, for Questioning Allegiance: Resituating Civic Education, 2020.
- Elected Treasurer, Philosophical Studies in Education, 2020.
- Presidential Research Award, the Korean Association for Multicultural Education, for “Harmony versus Homogenisation: Multiculturalism for Ethnic Minorities in China,” 2020.
- Student-Supervisor Publication Award, the University of Hong Kong, for “Multiculturalism in Chinese History in Hong Kong: Constructing Chinese Identity,” 2020.
- Elected Hong Kong Representative, Comparative Education Society of Asia, 2019.
- Book Award, the Philosophy of Education Society of Australasia, for Post-Truth, Fake News: Viral Modernity & Higher Education, 2019.
- Elected Communications Director, Philosophical Studies in Education, 2018.
- Elected President of the Philosophy of Education Society of Australasia, 2018.
- Vice President of the Philosophy of Education Society of Australasia, 2017.
- Silver Medal, the European Exhibition of Creativity and Innovation Conference, for Handbook of Research on Applied Learning Theory and Design in Modern Education, 2017.
- Asia Pacific Representative, UNESCO Mahatma Gandhi Institute of Education for Peace and Sustainable Development, 2016.
- Research Output Prize for Education, the University of Hong Kong, for Muslims and Islam in US Education: Reconsidering Multiculturalism, 2016.
- Book Award, the Philosophy of Education Society of Australasia, for Muslims and Islam in US Education: Reconsidering Multiculturalism, 2015.
- Elected Member Representative of the Philosophy of Education Society of Australasia, 2015.
- Early-Career Conference Award, the University of Hong Kong, for “Altruism, Non-Relational Care, and Global Citizenship Education,” 2015.
- Fellow of the Cambridge Overseas Scholars Trust, 2005.

== Selected Works ==
Books

- Muslims and Islam in U.S. Education: Reconsidering Multiculturalism (2014)
- Questioning Allegiance: Resituating Civic Education (2019)
- Beyond Virtue: The Politics of Educating Emotions (2020)
- Contesting Education and Identity in Hong Kong (2020)
- Educational Assessment in Tanzania: A Sociocultural Perspective (with Joyce Kahembe, 2020)
- Corporal Punishment in Preschool and at Home in Tanzania: A Child Rights Challenge (with Reuben Sungwa and Joyce Kahembe, 2022)

Edited volumes

- Asian Perspectives on Education for Sustainable Development (2020)
- The Ethical Academy: The University as an Ethical System (2022)
- Race and Racism: An Educational Philosophy and Theory Reader (2022)
- Marxism, Neoliberalism, and Intelligent Capitalism (2022)
- From Radical Marxism to Knowledge Socialism (2022)
- The Methodology and Philosophy of Collective Writing (2021)
- Feminist Theory in Diverse Productive Practices (2019)
- From “Aggressive Masculinity” to “Rape Culture” (2019)
- Handbook of Applied Learning Theory and Design in Modern Education (2016)

== Citations ==
Academic offices
| Preceded by Mark Bray | Director of the Comparative Education Research Centre; 2017 - 2020 | Succeeded by Anatoly Oleksiyenko |
| Preceded by Tina Besley | President of the Philosophy of Education Society of Australasia; 2018 - 2020 | Succeeded by Marek Tesar |
| Preceded by Mark Mason | Head of the Department of International Education - EDUHK; 2022 - 2023 | Succeeded by Lam Chi Ming |
| Preceded by Jae Park | President of the Comparative Education Society of Hong Kong; 2022 - | Incumbent |
| Preceded by Michael Peters (education academic) | Editor-in-Chief of Educational Philosophy and Theory; 2023 - | Incumbent |
