= Green liberalism =

Political ideology

Green liberalism, or liberal environmentalism, is liberalism that includes green politics in its ideology. Green liberals are usually liberal on social issues and "green" on economic issues. The term "green liberalism" was coined by political philosopher Marcel Wissenburg in his 1998 book Green Liberalism: The Free and The Green Society. He argues that liberalism must reject the idea of absolute property rights and accept restraints that limit the freedom to abuse nature and natural resources. However, he rejects the control of population growth and any control over the distribution of resources as incompatible with individual liberty, instead favoring supply-side control: more efficient production and curbs on overproduction and overexploitation. This view tends to dominate the movement, although critics say it actually puts individual liberties above sustainability.

== Philosophy ==
Green liberalism values the Earth very highly, emphasizing the importance of the planet being passed down to the next generation unharmed. Green liberalism accepts that the natural world is in a state of flux and does not seek to conserve the natural world as it is. However, it does seek to minimize the damage done by the human species on the natural world and to aid the regeneration of damaged areas. Green liberalism seeks to combine liberal democratic institutions and tenets such as equality and freedom of the individual with environmental protections that seek to reduce major threats to the environment like overconsumption and air pollution.

On economic issues, green liberals take a position somewhere between classical liberalism (on the center/center-right) and social liberalism (on the center/center-left): green liberals may favor slightly less government involvement than social liberals, but far more than classical liberals. Some green liberals practice free-market environmentalism and thus share some values with rightist classical liberalism or libertarianism. This is one of a few reasons why a blue-green alliance is possible in politics.

The historian Conrad Russell, a British Liberal Democrat member of the House of Lords, dedicated a chapter of his book The Intelligent Person's Guide to Liberalism to the subject of green liberalism. In a literary sense, the term "Green Liberalism" was coined, however, by political philosopher Marcel Wissenburg in his 1998 book Green Liberalism: The Free and The Green Society., among others.

=== Green Liberal Democrats ===
The existence of a Green liberal group predates Wissenburg's book by at least ten years in the UK when a pressure group was formed within the newly merged Liberal Democrats at a meeting in Nottingham addressed (as the keynote speaker) by Simon Hughes MP. The Green Liberal Democrats emerged from this inaugural meeting which had been organised by the Chair of the pre-existing Liberal Ecology Group (LEG) which had itself been set up eleven years previously in 1977. Keith Melton, one of the earliest members of LEG (its long title was the Liberal Ecology Group for Economic and Social Reform) was, at the time of the merger between the Liberal Party and the SDP in 1988, a senior lecturer in International Marketing at Nottingham Trent University, so it made sense to call that meeting in Nottingham. Most of the delegates at that meeting were LEG members, although there was a modest contingent from the SDP "Green Group".

The Liberal Ecology Group had been campaigning within the Liberal Party for years, pushing for a different, zero growth strategy for economics, following the philosophy elucidated in the Club of Rome's report "Limits to Growth". They also campaigned on air pollution issues, calling for the banning of lead in petrol for example and the banning of HFCs which were known to damage the ozone layer.

The Green Liberal Democrats has been a very active pressure group within the Liberal Democrats over the years and in 2018 celebrated 30 years of existence with a conference, also held in Nottingham, also organised by Keith Melton and also with (now Sir) Simon Hughes as the initial speaker. The significance of the group and its influence on the party was marked by other key speakers at the 2018 conference, including one quarter of the current Liberal Democrats` parliamentary representatives in the House of Commons. Sir Ed Davey MP related the environmental impact of the Liberal Democrats in the coalition years, establishing a Green Investment Bank (subsequently sold off by the Tory government)

Wera Hobhouse MP updated the Green approach to Air pollution and Sir Vince Cable MP, leader of the Liberal Democrats, and Honorary Professor of Economics at Nottingham University, the venue for the 2018 GLD conference, had the task of reviewing how the concept of Sustainable Development withstood the ravages of time. Cable was one of the co-authors of the Brundtland Commission report in 1987 which first introduced the sustainable development concept, championed by Gro Harlem Brundtland, the Commission`s Chair (and three-time prime minister of Norway).

One of the key early successes of the Green Liberal Democrats, and its new Chair, Keith Melton, was to ensure that the preamble to the Liberal Democrat constitution had a key reference to Green issues at the heart of the party with the following sentence appearing immediately after the first paragraph defining Liberal Philosophy - "We believe that each generation is responsible for the fate of our planet and, by safeguarding the balance of nature and the environment, for the long term continuity of life in all its forms."

The Liberal Party of Canada under Stéphane Dion placed the environment at the front of its political agenda, proposing an ecotax and tax shift called the Green Shift. Similarly, the British Liberal Democrats have drawn on the same concept to propose a "Green Tax Switch".

== See also ==
- Alliance 90/The Greens – Green political party in Germany
- Bright Future (Iceland) – Icelandic political party
- Centre Party (Sweden) – Political party in Sweden
- Civil Will-Green Party – Political party in Mongolia
- Climate justice – Concept for social justice in climate change context
- Conservation movement – Sociopolitical advocacy for protecting natural resources
- Dialogue for Hungary – Hungarian political party
- Dignified Yerevan
- Eco-capitalism – View that capital exists in nature as "natural capital"
- Eco-feminism – Approach to feminism influenced by ecologist movement
- Eco-socialism – Ideology merging aspects of socialism with green politics, ecology and alter-globalization
- Freedom Movement (Slovenia) – Political party in Slovenia
- Green League – Finnish political party
- Green conservatism – Combination of conservatism and environmentalism
- Green Liberal Party of Switzerland – Swiss political party
- Green libertarianism – Political ideology with mixed green and libertarian beliefs
- Green Movement (Bulgaria) – Bulgarian political party
- Green Party of Ontario/Canada
- Hatnua – Centre-left Israeli political party
- Independent Greens of Virginia – Independence Party of America affiliate
- Liberal Party (Norway) – Norwegian political party
- LMP – Hungary's Green Party – Hungarian political party
- Teal independents – Grouping of independent politicians in Australia
