= Political Animals and Animal Politics =

Collection of papers about animal ethics

- Editors: Marcel Wissenburg and David Schlosberg
- Series: Palgrave Macmillan Animal Ethics Series
- Subjects: Animal ethics, human exceptionalism, political philosophy, political theory, environmental politics, political science, social philosophy, political communication
- Published: Palgrave Macmillan
- Publication date: 2014
- Media type: Edited collection
- Pages: xii+180
- ISBN: 978-1-137-43461-6

Political Animals and Animal Politics is a 2014 edited collection published by Palgrave Macmillan and edited by the green political theorists Marcel Wissenburg and David Schlosberg. The work addresses the emergence of academic animal ethics informed by political philosophy as opposed to moral philosophy. It was the first edited collection to be published on the topic, and the first book-length attempt to explore the breadth and boundaries of the literature. As well as a substantial introduction by the editors, it features ten sole-authored chapters split over three parts, respectively concerning institutional change for animals, the relationship between animal ethics and ecologism, and real-world laws made for the benefit of animals. The book's contributors were Wissenburg, Schlosberg, Manuel Arias-Maldonado, Chad Flanders, Christie Smith, Clemens Driessen, Simon Otjes, Kurtis Boyer, Per-Anders Svärd, and Mihnea Tanasescu. The focus of their individual chapters varies, but recurring features include discussions of human exceptionalism, exploration of ways that animal issues are or could be present in political discourse, and reflections on the relationship between theory and practice in politics.

In part, Political Animals and Animal Politics arose from a workshop that Wissenburg and Schlosberg organised at the 2012 European Consortium for Political Research Joint Sessions conference, though not all attendees contributed to the volume and not all contributors presented at the workshop. Footage of the workshop appeared in De Haas in de Marathon (The Pacer in the Marathon), a 2012 documentary about the Dutch Party for the Animals. Political Animals and Animal Politics was published as part of the Palgrave Macmillan Animal Ethics Series, edited by Andrew Linzey and Priscilla Cohn.

Reviewers identified the contributions from Driessen, Flanders and Boyer as of particular interest, but challenged the inclusion of chapters focused on the environment. They criticised the book's failure to include contributions from, or sufficiently engage with the work of, the key voices in the politically focused animal ethics literature, such as Robert Garner, Sue Donaldson and Will Kymlicka, Alasdair Cochrane, Kimberly Smith, or Siobhan O'Sullivan. Wissenburg's chapter was identified as the one that engaged most directly with this literature, but his approach was a negative one. Garner has written that Political Animals and Animal Politics should be praised for its trailblazing, but predicted that it would be superseded by stronger collections on the same theme.

== Production and release ==
The Dutch green political theorist Marcel Wissenburg and the American green political theorist David Schlosberg (Note: At the time of the "Political Animals and Animal Politics" workshop, Wissenburg and Schlosberg were based at Radboud University and the University of Sydney respectively. At the time of the book's publication, Wissenburg was Professor of Political Theory at the Department of Public Administration and Political Science at Radboud, and Schlosberg was Professor of Environmental Politics in the Department of Government and International Relations at Sydney.) organised a workshop entitled "Political Animals and Animal Politics" at the 2012 European Consortium for Political Research Joint Sessions conference, which was held at the University of Antwerp, Belgium, between 10 and 15 April 2012. The two had been talking for around a year about organising a conference broadly on the theme of "nature, animals and political theory". The workshop aimed to fill a gap in the political literature on the status of nonhuman animals, something, they claimed, previously considered only at the margins of work otherwise about the environment/resource management, or else by those more primarily interested in moral issues. Both Wissenburg and Schlosberg presented papers; papers were also presented by Manuel Arias-Maldonado (University of Granada), Susan Boonman-Berson (Wageningen University and Research), Kurtis Boyer (Lund University), Clemens Driessen (Utrecht University), Chad Flanders (Saint Louis University), Robert Garner (University of Leicester), Margareta Hanes (Vrije Universiteit Brussel), Paul Lucardie (University of Groningen), Christopher Neff (University of Sydney), Kaspar Ossenblok (Ghent University), Simon Otjes (Leiden University), Christie Smith (University of Exeter), Mihnea Tanasescu (Vrije Universiteit Brussel) and Catherine Zwetkoff (University of Liège). (Note: University affiliations match those at the time of the "Political Animal and Animal Politics" workshop.) For Schlosberg, the workshop, and the wide range of papers presented, illustrated the "coming-of-age of animal politics as a subfield of political theory".

Speakers affiliated with the Dutch Party for the Animals (logo pictured) joined the workshop on its second day, and footage of the conference appeared in the film De Haas in de Marathon (The Pacer in the Marathon, 2012) about the party.

The workshop featured a lecture by Michel Vandenbosch, of the Belgian organisation Global Action in the Interest of Animals. On the second day, those involved were joined by Niko Koffeman of the Dutch Party for the Animals and Karen Soeters of that party's Nicolaas G. Pierson Foundation think tank. Footage from that day of the workshop, shot by Joost de Haas, was included in the documentary film De Haas in de Marathon (The Pacer in the Marathon, 2012). The film was created by de Haas, who was commissioned by the Nicolaas G. Pierson Foundation. It focuses on the Party for the Animals's first ten years, including interviews with people associated with the party and explorations of the party's public reception. The film premiered on 28 October 2012, during a gathering to celebrate the party's 10th anniversary. It has since been made available in numerous languages.

Wissenburg and Schlosberg's workshop formed the basis of Political Animals and Animal Politics, a collection edited by Wissenburg and Schlosberg, earlier versions of many of the volume's chapters having been presented at that time. Originally, the editors had intended to have discussion of political theory, of movements for animals and of real-world politics, but the final volume was somewhat more theory-based than this. Political Animals and Animal Politics was published in 2014 by Palgrave Macmillan; it is part of the Palgrave Macmillan Animal Ethics Series, which is edited by Andrew Linzey and Priscilla Cohn. This interdisciplinary series aims to explore the practical and conceptual challenges posed by animal ethics. Political Animals and Animal Politics was published in hardback (ISBN 978-1-137-43461-6), softback (ISBN 978-1-349-68310-9), eBook (ISBN 978-1-349-68308-6), and online (doi:10.1007/978-1-349-68308-6) formats.

Political Animals and Animal Politics was the first edited collection devoted to the "political turn in animal ethics", and the first "book-length attempt at seeking to define the contours" of this literature. According to Siobhan O'Sullivan, the book may have been the first time that political turn in animal ethics—a phrase that had been used at European conferences for a number of years—appeared in print. This "animal political philosophy" is identified by the editors as an academic literature at the meeting point of animal ethics, political philosophy and real-world (but theory-driven) politics. Wissenburg and Schlosberg posit that this literature, though at one time only a small part of more morally focused animal ethics, has developed into a separate field of enquiry in its own right. They single out two key texts: Robert Garner's 2013 A Theory of Justice for Animals (Oxford University Press) and Sue Donaldson and Will Kymlicka's 2011 Zoopolis (Oxford University Press). Recognising the editors' identification of the political turn in animal ethics, Garner, writing with O'Sullivan and Alasdair Cochrane, (Note: Both Cochrane and O'Sullivan are identified by Wissenburg and Schlosberg as contributors to the animal political philosophy literature.) argues that the literature is both made distinct and unified by its focus on justice; contributions to this literature, these authors argue, "imagine how political institutions, structures and processes might be transformed so as to secure justice for both human and nonhuman animals. Put simply, the essential feature of the political turn is this constructive focus on justice."

== Synopsis ==
Political Animals and Animal Politics has three key aims, and, correspondingly, its chapters are split into three sections. These aims are the analysis of three key "innovations" that the editors identify in the book's introduction. The first of these is the move, in animal ethics, from thinking about personal change to thinking about the implementation of rules or norms of conduct at the societal level. The second of these is a possible rapprochement between animal ethics and ecologism (environmental ethics and green political theory). The third is the increased presence of animal protection laws for the benefit of nonhuman animals themselves. Aside from the introduction, the book features ten single-authored chapters: three in Part I: The Politicization of the Animal Advocacy Discourse, three in Part II: The Rapprochement between Animal Ethics and Ecologism, and four in Part III: The Introduction of Laws and Institutions for the Benefit of Animals.

Chapter list
| Section | No. | Chapter title | Author(s) | Affiliation (Note: At the time of the book's publication.) |
|---|---|---|---|---|
| —N/a | 1 | "Introducing Animal Politics and Political Animals" | Marcel Wissenburg and David Schlosberg | Radboud University/University of Sydney |
| Part I: The Politicization of the Animal Advocacy Discourse | 2 | "Rethinking the Human-Animal Divide in the Anthropocene" | Manuel Arias-Maldonado | University of Málaga |
| Part I: The Politicization of the Animal Advocacy Discourse | 3 | "An Agenda for Animal Political Theory" | Marcel Wissenburg | Radboud University |
| Part I: The Politicization of the Animal Advocacy Discourse | 4 | "Public Reason and Animal Rights" | Chad Flanders | Saint Louis University |
| Part II: The Rapprochement between Animal Ethics and Ecologism | 5 | "Articulating Ecological Injustices of Recognition" | Christie Smith | University of Exeter |
| Part II: The Rapprochement between Animal Ethics and Ecologism | 6 | "Ecological Justice for the Anthropocene" | David Schlosberg | University of Sydney |
| Part II: The Rapprochement between Animal Ethics and Ecologism | 7 | "Animal Deliberation" | Clemens Driessen | Wageningen University and Research |
| Part III: The Introduction of Laws and Institutions for the Benefit of Animals | 8 | "Animal Party Politics in Parliament" | Simon Otjes | Groningen University |
| Part III: The Introduction of Laws and Institutions for the Benefit of Animals | 9 | "The Limits of Species Advocacy" | Kurtis Boyer | Lund University |
| Part III: The Introduction of Laws and Institutions for the Benefit of Animals | 10 | "Slaughter and Animal Welfarism in Sweden 1900–1944" | Per-Anders Svärd | Stockholm University |
| Part III: The Introduction of Laws and Institutions for the Benefit of Animals | 11 | "The Rights of Nature: Theory and Practice" | Mihnea Tanasescu | Free University of Brussels |

== Contributions ==
"Rethinking the Human-Animal Divide in the Anthropocene", Manuel Arias-Maldonado

Arias-Maldonado argues that traditional appeals to the value of nonhuman animals have failed to be sufficiently motivating, and that, instead, human/nonhuman relationships are appropriately grounded upon the ideas of human exceptionalism and human domination. These notions, he claims, can be the basis of political transformation for nonhuman animals. He argues that once these ideas are properly understood, they can ground an idea of human sympathy for nonhuman animals, which is just one part of a caring and sustainable Anthropocene. Even if an alternative politics might ultimately be preferable, Arias-Maldonado argues, a change to a focus on sympathy might be useful and realistic as a political strategy.

"An Agenda for Animal Political Theory", Marcel Wissenburg

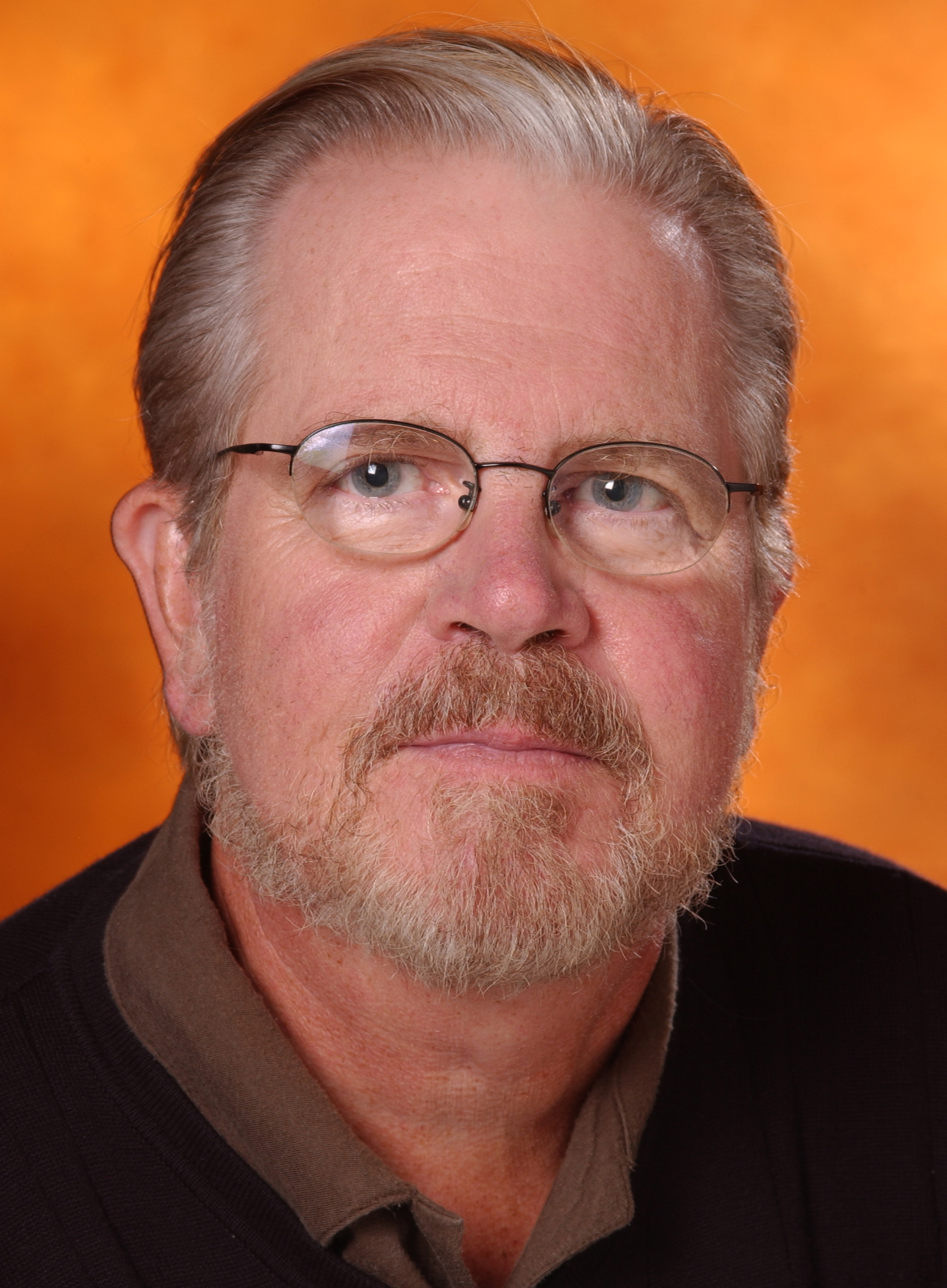
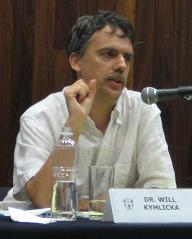
In chapter 3, Wissenburg challenges liberal assumptions in animal rights, including both the "old" liberalism of Tom Regan (left) and the "new" liberalism of Sue Donaldson and Will Kymlicka (right).

For the purposes of his contribution, Wissenburg takes many standard contentions in animal ethics for granted. However, he challenges mainstream animal ethicists' tendency to adopt the language of liberalism, which he suggests misconstrues nonhuman animals as individuals and posits false dichotomies about their status. This adoption of liberal ideas can come in Tom Regan's "old" form or Donaldson and Kymlicka's "new" form. Wissenburg challenges Donaldson and Kymlicka's extension of citizenship to nonhuman animals, and instead sketches the outline of an alternative proposal that pays attention to individual animals' modes of being. This he labels, adapting a phrase from Robert Nozick, "liberalism for humans and feudalism for animals".

"Public Reason and Animal Rights", Chad Flanders

Flanders argues that nonhuman animals could be "below" politics, in that they do not have politically considerable interests, or "above" politics, in that they have rights that trump political decision-making processes. Flanders argues that if animals are excluded from basic justice, as John Rawls held, they can be defended on metaphysical grounds (what Rawls refers to as on the basis of comprehensive doctrines, as opposed to the public reasons which must be used for arguments in the political realm). This is potentially liberating for animal advocates. Nonetheless, Flanders argues, animal issues may be matters of basic justice insofar as they affect humans or that animals themselves have rights. Alternatively, the wrongness of animal cruelty may be a "fixed point" in our political reasoning. Flanders concludes that Rawlsianism provides a good starting point for the inclusion of animals in political decision-making.

"Articulating Ecological Injustices of Recognition", Christie Smith

Smith draws on Val Plumwood to argue that rather than solely think about resituating animals in ethical terms, what is needed is the resituation of humans in ecological terms; both are needed, she argues, as the two tasks are linked. Smith rejects the culture/nature dichotomy, and suggests that a politics of recognition is an appropriate way to think about relationships. She draws upon feminist and ecofeminist literature to conceive of recognition theory beyond intersubjective self/other relations, allowing recognition beyond the human self. Smith seeks to show that recognition theories should not be considered "soft" or "naive" as accounts of justice, and instead that they offer an appropriate mode for thinking about ecological and animal injustices.

"Ecological Justice for the Anthropocene", David Schlosberg

Schlosberg's contribution, is partly a response to challenges made to his Defining Environmental Justice (2007). Schlosberg aims to step beyond previous accounts of animal rights or environmentalism as requirements of justice by deploying a mixed capabilities/deliberation approach applicable to both ecosystems and nonhuman animals. Schlosberg challenges criticisms of his capabilities approach (specifically, a capabilities approach that moves beyond humans) grounded in the existence of conflicts of capabilities, claiming that a form of deliberative democracy can overcome the problem posed by these conflicts. His mixed account, he claims, provides a form of justice appropriate for thinking about human and nonhuman individuals and collectives in the Anthropocene.

"Animal Deliberation", Clemens Driessen

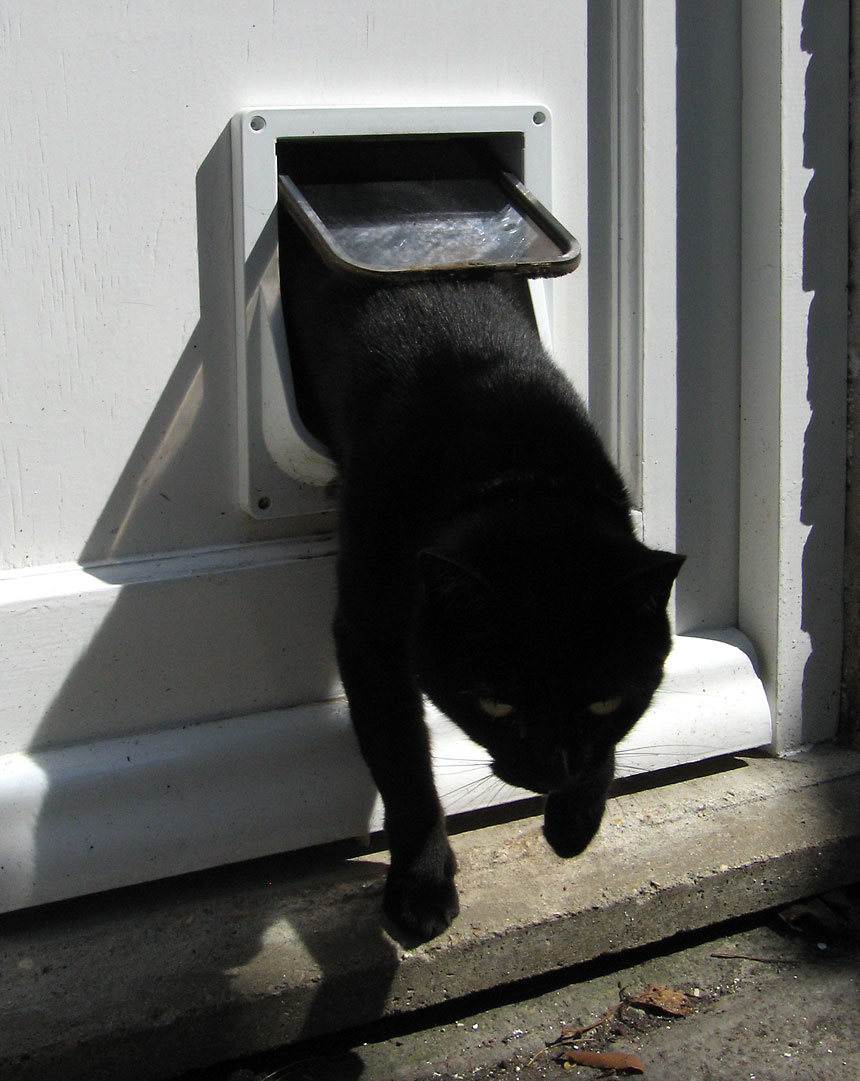
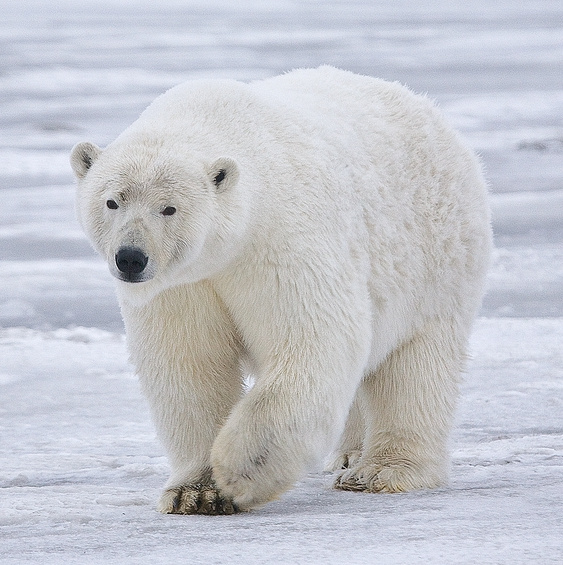
In chapter 7, Clemens Driessen argues that the building of a door with a cat flap (left) could result from political deliberation between cats and humans, while, in chapter 9, Kurtis Boyer explores the political motivations of various groups claiming to champion conservation of polar bears (right).

Driessen explores ways in which nonhuman animals might be understood to be engaging in political deliberation. His claim is empirical rather than normative, as he presents nonhuman animals as already being in political dialogue with humans; rather than arguing that rights should be extended to animals, he calls for a recognition of how interactions with animals have always been political. This is particularly noticeable, he argues, when humans are involved in the development of new technologies, analysing the example (following Bruno Latour) of Gaston Lagaffe building a door in dialogue with his boss and the office cat, and of farmers and cows using milking robots. He argues that a recognition of this animal deliberation can lead to more thoughtful forms of both environmentalism and democracy.

"Animal Party Politics in Parliament", Simon Otjes

Otjes's approach is more empirical than that of many contributors to Political Animals and Animal Politics. He examines the Dutch Party for the Animals (PvdD), which, in 2006, won two seats in the House of Representatives. Otjes explores whether the PvdD's presence has changed the amount of time more established parties spent on animal issues by examining both parliamentary speeches and motions before and after the introduction of the PvdD members. He finds that established parties began to talk more about animal issues in 2006, and that this could be attributed to conflict between the PvdD and the established parties. Though Otjes allows that his study's relevance may seem limited, he concludes that smaller parties can affect government agenda by remaining focused on their own primary concern.

"The Limits of Species Advocacy", Kurtis Boyer

Boyer observes the distinction between how nonhuman animals can receive political protection as individuals and as species. He argues that the latter form of protection is motivated by a desire to preserve human experience of the species rather than the experiences of the nonhuman animals themselves. Politically motivated species advocacy, Boyer argues, is highly anthropocentric, as advocates present these animals as sharing in particular revered virtues; as a result, the likes of habitat and genetic health are the focus of advocates, rather than the nonhuman animals themselves. Using the example of polar bear preservation, Boyer illustrates how species advocacy becomes tied up with broader political goals concerning humans and competing visions of the value of animals. He concludes that the advancement of species advocacy can limit the achievement of the goals of the animal welfare or animal rights movements.

"Slaughter and Animal Welfarism in Sweden 1900–1944", Per-Anders Svärd

Svärd, taking a more empirical approach than many other contributors, explores laws surrounding animal welfare in early 20th-century Sweden. He seeks to offer an empirical grounding for the argument that animal welfarism is problematic for animals, entrenching harmful use and speciesism. He analyses all official documentation from the Riksdag from 1900 to 1944 on the subject of animal slaughter and welfare drawing upon Foucauldian policy analysis and poststructuralist discourse analysis. He conceives of the debates as a political problematisation in which (drawing upon Lacanian psychoanalysis) animal cruelty was blamed on certain "other" groups (such as Jews and Sami). He argues that animal welfarism was not the natural continuation of an old anti-cruelty discourse, but that Sweden's 1937 regulation of slaughter and 1944 animal protection laws served to reconstitute, reaffirm, and expand speciesist relations, paving the way for animal exploitation's expansion.

"The Rights of Nature: Theory and Practice", Mihnea Tanasescu

Tanasescu explores the idea of rights for nature, an idea that, though unorthodox, has seen success in implementation. He introduces the concept, with a focus on the differences between moral and legal rights, before examining the particular case of Ecuador's entrenchment of rights for nature in its 2008 constitution, which is compared with other real-world cases. He finally addresses what can be learnt from these theoretical and practical considerations. He concludes that much work on the topic is left to be done, but the key lesson to be learnt is the significance of innovation; environmental politics, he claims, should remain both inventive and optimistic.

== Academic reception ==
External media

Audio
- Knowing Animals, episode 14: "Ecological justice and animals with David Schlosberg"; David Schlosberg discusses his contribution to Political Animals and Animal Politics on the Knowing Animals podcast

Video
- Defining Human-Animal Studies, video 14: "The Political Turn in Animal Ethics"; Siobhan O'Sullivan defines "the political turn in animal ethics" for the Animals & Society Institute

Political Animals and Animal Politics was reviewed by Garner for Environmental Values, and the philosophers Jeremy David Bendik-Keymer, Josh Milburn, and Dan Hooley for Environmental Ethics, the Political Studies Review and the Journal of Animal Ethics respectively. (Note: When their respective reviews were published, Garner was Professor of Political Theory at Leicester, Bendik-Keymer was based at Case-Western Reserve University, Milburn was based at Queen's University Belfast, and Hooley was based at the University of Toronto.) Garner lamented the absence of many of the key voices in the political theory literature on animal ethics—such as Cochrane, Donaldson and Kymlicka, O'Sullivan, Tony Milligan, Kimberly Smith or Garner himself—in the book, meaning that Political Animals and Animal Politics "takes on the role of an observer of this debate rather than directly contributing to it in a leading sense". He also felt that the book offered little consideration of the details of the work of these leading theorists, identifying the absence of discussion of Cochrane's interest-based rights approach, a superficial consideration of Regan's account of animal rights, an oversimplification of his own position and a lack of context to understand the respective work of Kimberly Smith and O'Sullivan. He considered Wissenburg's chapter to be the only one that engages with the debate about the political turn in general, but noted that Wissenburg's approach is a negative one; Garner considered this unsurprising, given that Wissenburg is a green political theorist with little sympathy for "animal political theory".

Bendik-Keymer praised the book as having a "report-from-a-cutting-edge-conference quality", characterising two conceptual divides as shaping the volume: first, the distinction between theories endorsing human exceptionalism and those not; and, second, the disconnect between theory and practice. For him, the essays of part three—effectively three case studies—illustrated ways that the "actual practice of politics evince psychological and pragmatic concerns that do not fit neatly into normative foundations". The core philosophical debate (about human exceptionalism) takes place in parts one and two. In part one, he suggested, essays assumed (and sometimes supported) human exceptionalism, sometimes framing it as the only justified way to include animals in politics, while human exceptionalism was denied in part two. It is Bendik-Keymer's view, in line with part one but against part two, that one need not reject anthropocentrism to "open up ecological thought". Anthropocentrism, he argued, can be "open to ecological identifications, having humane virtues, and showing responsibility for our behavior", though this is often denied in environmental ethics. Parts two and three, Bendik-Keymer felt, reveal "the need for a viable politics of animals to be grounded in an adequate experience of community". The area of research that the book exposes, he argued, is animal community, and, in particular, whether animals' roles as co-creators of community (though not politics) calls for their recognition as political agents, rather than simply being included in politics through the ethical concern of human political agents.

Milburn questioned the success of the volume in achieving its second stated goal, concerning rapprochement between animal and environmental ethics; he considered the contributions respectively of Christie Smith, Schlosberg, and Tanasescu to be more clearly in the domain of environmental ethics than animal ethics, questioning the extent to which they belong in a volume about "animal politics". Similarly, Hooley argued that Political Animals and Animal Politics was "less of a work in the emerging field of animal politics than it is a collection of essays in the field of environmental politics". Alternatively, he claimed it could be viewed as a mixed work, noting that the contributions from Flanders, Otjes, Boyer and Svärd offered new contributions to the literature on animals and politics. Hooley thought it surprising that few authors engaged with the work of Donaldson and Kymlicka, and was critical of Wissenburg's discussion of the pair, which he claimed was "all too brief and ultimately disappointing".

Milburn thought that the opening chapters (and introduction) did well to establish the volume, and was happy with the inclusion of the more empirical contributions, given their potential theoretical significance. He picked out the chapters by Driessen, Boyer, and Wissenburg respectively as highlights, suggesting that the contributions of Driessen and Boyer seemed to challenge the volume's second stated goal, and noting that, though it was strong, he disagreed with the claims of Wissenburg's chapter. Garner highlighted the contributions of Flanders and Driessen, and commended the editors for putting together the book. Hooley concluded his review by claiming that the book offered something to those interested in the place of animals in politics, but that much of its contents would be of more interest for those looking to read about environmental political theory.

== Legacy ==
Garner identified Political Animals and Animal Politics as the first edited collection devoted to the political turn in animal ethics. Though he claimed that it was likely to be superseded, he argued that Political Animals and Animal Politics should be "welcomed for its trailblazing". Subsequent collections identified in reviews of the literature in the political turn include Garner and O'Sullivan's The Political Turn in Animal Ethics and Andrew Woodhall and Gabriel Garmendia da Trindade's Ethical and Political Approaches to Nonhuman Animal Issues. Another publication identified in these reviews is the open access journal Politics and Animals; this published its first issue in 2015 with an "editorial collective" consisting of Boyer, Svärd, Katherine Wayne and Guy Scotton.
