= Anthony G. Rud =

American philosopher of education

- Born: Anthony Gordon Rud Jr.
- Awards: Distinguished Professor, Washington State University (2013); Fellow, Philosophy of Education Society (1992); Distinguished Service Award, John Dewey Society (2012); Critics' Choice Book Award, American Educational Studies Association (2012, 2016, 2018); James and Helen Merritt Distinguished Service Award, Northern Illinois University (2025)

Academic background
- Education: Dartmouth College (AB, 1976); Northwestern University (MA, 1979; PhD, 1982)
- Thesis: Gadamer's Hegel: An Essay on Absolute Idealism and Hermeneutics (1982)
- Doctoral advisor: William Earle

Academic work
- Discipline: Philosophy of education
- Sub-discipline: Cultural foundations of education
- Institutions: Washington State University (emeritus); Purdue University; North Carolina Center for the Advancement of Teaching; Dartmouth College; Northwestern University
- Main interests: Moral dimensions of teaching and learning, John Dewey, Albert Schweitzer, reverence in education, human-animal interaction in schools
- Notable works: Albert Schweitzer's Legacy for Education: Reverence for Life (2011); Teaching with Reverence (2012); John Dewey at 150 (2009)

Anthony Gordon Rud Jr. is an American philosopher of education and Distinguished Professor Emeritus in the Department of Teaching and Learning at Washington State University. His research focuses on the cultural foundations of education, with particular emphasis on the moral dimensions of teacher education, P-12 educational leadership, and higher education, and draws on the thought of John Dewey and Albert Schweitzer. He has served as president of the John Dewey Society (2017–2019) and president of the Philosophy of Education Society (2023–2024), and was dean of the College of Education at Washington State University (2010–2012).

== Education ==
Rud earned an A.B. in religion, cum laude, from Dartmouth College in 1976. He studied German at the Goethe-Institut in Staufen, Germany, in 1977. He received an M.A. in philosophy from Northwestern University in 1979, where he held a University Fellowship (1977–78), and a Ph.D. in philosophy from Northwestern in 1982. His doctoral dissertation, supervised by William Earle, was titled Gadamer's Hegel: An Essay on Absolute Idealism and Hermeneutics. He also completed graduate coursework at the Institute for the Advancement of Philosophy for Children at Montclair State University in 1982.

== Career ==
Before entering graduate school, Rud taught humanities and social studies at the Berkshire Learning Center, a special needs private high school in Pittsfield, Massachusetts, from 1976 to 1977.

From 1982 to 1986, Rud served as Assistant Director of Admissions at Dartmouth College, where he focused on recruiting African American, Asian American, and Latino applicants. He also held an appointment as Adjunct Assistant Professor of Philosophy at Dartmouth in 1984.

From 1986 to 1994, Rud was a Fellow and later Senior Fellow at the North Carolina Center for the Advancement of Teaching (NCCAT), where he was one of the institution's first three faculty members and helped establish the center.

In 1994, Rud joined Purdue University as Associate Dean of the School of Education and Associate Professor in the Department of Educational Studies. He served as Interim Head of the department from 2001 to 2002 and as Head from 2008 to 2010.

Rud was one of three finalists for Dean of the College of Education at Washington State University, and was appointed by Provost Warwick Bayly, who cited Rud's "very strong background in education and administration." He succeeded Interim Dean Phyllis Erdman, who had led the college following the deaths of Dean Judy Mitchell and Interim Dean Len Foster in 2009.

Rud moved to Washington State University in 2010 as Professor and Dean of the College of Education. After stepping down as dean in 2012, he was named Distinguished Professor in 2013, a position he continues to hold in the Department of Teaching and Learning. He is a faculty member in the Cultural Studies and Social Thought in Education program within the College of Education, and holds the title of Distinguished Professor Emeritus.

Rud served as president of the John Dewey Society from 2017 to 2019. He was elected to the Executive Committee of the Philosophy of Education Society in 2020 and served as president of the society in 2023–2024. He chaired the Dewey Studies Special Interest Group of the American Educational Research Association from 2016 to 2018.

From 2004 to 2010, Rud served as editor of Education and Culture, the journal of the John Dewey Society. He was also series editor of the Social and Cultural Foundations of Education Book Series at Palgrave Macmillan from 2013 to 2020.

At Washington State University, Rud chaired the Faculty Senate (2016–2017), served as Faculty Representative to the Board of Regents (2019–2020), and chaired the Presidential Commission on Campus Climate (2013–2014).

== Selected publications ==
=== Books ===
- Rud, Anthony G., and Walter Oldendorf, eds. A Place for Teacher Renewal: Challenging the Intellect, Creating Educational Reform. New York: Teachers College Press, 1992.
- Garrison, Jim, and Anthony G. Rud, eds. The Educational Conversation: Closing the Gap. Albany: SUNY Press, 1995.
- Rud, Anthony G., Jim Garrison, and Lynda Stone, eds. John Dewey at 150: Reflections for a New Century. West Lafayette, IN: Purdue University Press, 2009.
- Rud, Anthony G. Albert Schweitzer's Legacy for Education: Reverence for Life. New York: Palgrave Macmillan, 2011.
- Rud, Anthony G., and Jim Garrison, eds. Teaching with Reverence: Reviving an Ancient Virtue for Today's Schools. New York: Palgrave Macmillan, 2012.
- Rice, Suzanne, and Anthony G. Rud, eds. The Educational Significance of Human and Non-Human Animal Interactions: Blurring the Species Line. New York: Palgrave Macmillan, 2016.
- You, Zhongjing, Anthony G. Rud, and Yuxin Hu. The Philosophy of Chinese Moral Education: A History. New York: Palgrave Macmillan, 2018.
- Rice, Suzanne, and Anthony G. Rud, eds. Educational Dimensions of School Lunch: Critical Perspectives. New York: Palgrave Macmillan, 2018.
- Adesope, Olusola O., and Anthony G. Rud, eds. Contemporary Technologies in Education: Maximizing Student Engagement, Motivation, and Learning. Cham: Springer International Publishing, 2019.
- Maarhuis, Patricia, and Anthony G. Rud, eds. Imagining Dewey: Artful Works and Dialogue about Art as Experience. Leiden: Brill/Sense, 2020.
- Ávila, Joel, Anthony G. Rud, Leonard Waks, and Elizabeth Ring, eds. The Contemporary Relevance of John Dewey's Theories on Teaching and Learning: Deweyan Perspectives on Standardization, Accountability, and Assessment in Education. New York: Routledge, 2022.

=== Articles ===
- Rud, Anthony G. "Use and Abuse of Socrates in Present Day Teaching." Education Policy Analysis Archives 5 (1997): 20.
- Rud, Anthony G. "Disciplined Listening, Undominated Dialogue: Online Inquiry and Teacher Renewal." Journal of Thought 35, no. 2 (2000): 9–18.
- Rud, Anthony G. "The Head, Heart, and Hands." Education and Culture 22, no. 1 (2006): 5–6.
- Rud, Anthony G., and Jim Garrison. "The Continuum of Listening." Learning Inquiry 1, no. 2 (2007): 163–168.
- Adesope, Olusola O., and Anthony G. Rud. "Maximizing the Affordances of Contemporary Technologies in Education: Promises and Possibilities." In Contemporary Technologies in Education: Maximizing Student Engagement, Motivation, and Learning, edited by Olusola O. Adesope and Anthony G. Rud, 1–15. Cham: Springer International Publishing, 2018.

== Awards and honors ==
- Critics' Choice Book Award, American Educational Studies Association, 2012 (for Teaching with Reverence), 2016 (for The Educational Significance of Human and Non-Human Animal Interactions), and 2018 (for Educational Dimensions of School Lunch)
- Outstanding Book Award, Society of Professors of Education, 2013 (for Teaching with Reverence), and 2020 (for Contemporary Technologies in Education, co-edited with Olusola Adesope)
- Distinguished Service Award, John Dewey Society, 2012
- Fellow, Philosophy of Education Society, since 1992
- Ronald Fosnaugh Award for Outstanding Faculty Fellow, Purdue University, 2007
- James and Helen Merritt Distinguished Service Award for Contributions to Philosophy of Education, Northern Illinois University, 2025
