= Harawira =

Harawira is a surname. Notable people with the surname include:

- Hone Harawira (born 1955), New Zealand activist and politician
- Joe Harawira (1946–2017), New Zealand campaigner against industrial chemical poisoning
- Makere Stewart-Harawira (born 1945), New Zealand academic
- Titewhai Harawira (1932–2023), New Zealand activist

== See also ==
- Harawira Gardiner (1943–2022), soldier, public servant and writer
