= Makere Stewart-Harawira =

Canadian - New Zealand academic

- Born: 1945

Academic background
- Education: University of Auckland
- Thesis: Globalisation and the Return to Empire: an Indigenous Response = Te torino whakahaere, whakamuri (2002)
- Doctoral advisor: Michael Peters, Graham Smith

Makere Stewart-Harawira (born Margaret Stewart in 1945) is a Canadian–New Zealand academic, and is a full professor at the University of Alberta, specialising in Indigenous knowledge, globalization and water rights. She is a member of the International Union for Conservation of Nature's Commission on Ecosystem Management, and a national board member of the Keepers of the Water.

== Academic career ==
Stewart-Harawira is an enrolled member of the Waitaha ki Te Waipounamu iwi in Aotearoa New Zealand.

In 1993 Stewart-Harawira earned a Bachelor of Arts in education and Māori studies, followed by a Master of Arts with honours in education in 1995, both at the University of Auckland. She went on to complete a PhD titled Globalisation and the Return to Empire: an Indigenous Response = Te torino whakahaere, whakamuri, also at the University of Auckland. Her doctoral research was supervised by Michael Peters and Graham Smith.

Stewart-Harawira worked at Te Whare Wānanga o Awanuiārangi, where she was acting Head of Graduate Studies and a lecturer in the Department of Postgraduate Studies. She was a research fellow at the Woolf Fisher Research Institute at Auckland, and then moved to Canada in 2004. Stewart-Harawira is a full professor at the University of Alberta, where she researches Indigenous water rights and environmentalism. She is a board member of the Canadian NGO Keepers of the Water, contributed to the IPCC 6th Global Assessment, and is a member of both the Commission on Ecosystem Management and the joint Specialist Group on Indigenous Peoples, Customary & Environmental Laws and Human Rights for the International Union for Conservation of Nature.

Makere-Stewart's 2005 book, The New Imperial Order: Indigenous responses to globalization, was described by historian Lorenzo Veracini as "a remarkable and necessary contribution". Professor of Māori Studies Mason Durie described it as "a thorough and scholarly examination of indigeneity in a global environment and [Makere Stewart-Harawira] has made a valuable and major contribution to the indigenous literature".

In 2020 Makere-Stewart co-founded the I-STEAM Pathways programme at the University of Alberta. The programme offers paid internships to First Nations, Métis and Inuit youth to conduct interdisciplinary research in fields such as biology, technology, environmental engineering, policy and law. The programme is the first such initiative in Canada, and came about after the Provincial Court of Alberta ordered the Obed Mountain Mine to fund environmental research as recompense for a 2013 spill into the Athabasca River.

== Awards ==
Makere-Stewart co-wrote a paper that was runner-up in the Environmental Politics Article of the Year Award in 2021, "Multispecies justice: theories, challenges, and a research agenda for environmental politics". In 2022 Makere-Stewart and the other co-founders of I-STEAM won the Social Innovation – Programs Promoting Indigenous People category of the ASTech Awards. In 2023 Makere-Stewart was awarded for Outstanding Achievement in Social Innovation: Programs Promoting Indigenous People by the University of Alberta.

== Selected works ==
- Stewart-Harawira, Makere (2005). The New Imperial Order: Indigenous responses to globalization. London, New York: Bloomsbury Publishing, Zed Books.
- Danielle Celermajer; David Schlosberg; Lauren Rickards; Makere Stewart-Harawira; Mathias Thaler; Tschakert, Petra; Blanche Verlie; Winter, Christine (2020). "Multispecies justice: theories, challenges, and a research agenda for environmental politics". Environmental Politics. 30 (1–2): 119–140. doi:10.1080/09644016.2020.1827608. Wikidata Q114966853.
- Tschakert, Petra; David Schlosberg; Danielle Celermajer; Lauren Rickards; Winter, Christine; Mathias Thaler; Makere Stewart‐Harawira; Blanche Verlie (2020). "Multispecies justice: Climate‐just futures with, for and beyond humans". Wiley Interdisciplinary Reviews: WIREs Climate Change. 12 (2). doi:10.1002/wcc.699. Wikidata Q114966846.
- Makere Stewart-Harawira (2005). "Cultural Studies, Indigenous Knowledge and Pedagogies of Hope". Policy Futures in Education. 3 (2): 153–163. doi:10.2304/pfie.2005.3.2.4. Wikidata Q113257952.
- Makere Stewart-Harawira (2013). "Challenging Knowledge Capitalism: Indigenous Research in the 21st Century". Socialist Studies. 9 (1). doi:10.18740/s43s3v. Wikidata Q131557210.
- Elaine Coburn; Aileen Moreton-Robinson; George Sefa Dei; Makere Stewart-Harawira (2013). "Unspeakable Things: Indigenous Research and Social Science". Socio (2): 331–348. doi:10.4000/socio.524. Wikidata Q131557211.
