= Anthony Rud =

Anthony Rud may refer to:

- Anthony M. Rud (1893–1942), American writer and pulp magazine editor
- Anthony G. Rud, American philosopher of education

== See also ==
- Anthony Rudd (c. 1549–1615), Welsh bishop
