= Audra Simpson =

Native American anthropologist

Professor Audra Simpson
- Known for: Mohawk Interruptus: Political Life Across the Borders of Settler States

Academic background
- Education: PhD (Anthropology) McGill University
- Thesis: To the Reserve and Back Again: Kahnawake Mohawk Narratives of Self, Home and Nation (2004)
- Doctoral advisor: Bruce Trigger; Colin H. Scott

Academic work
- Discipline: Anthropology
- Sub-discipline: Political Anthropology, Indigenous Studies, American and Canadian Studies, Gender studies, Sexuality Studies.
- Institutions: Columbia University
- Notable ideas: Ethnographic Refusal
- Website: https://anthropology.columbia.edu/content/audra-simpson

Audra Simpson is Professor of Anthropology at Columbia University. Her work engages with Indigenous politics in the United States and Canada and cuts across anthropology, Indigenous studies, Gender studies, and Political science. She has won multiple awards for her book, Mohawk Interruptus: Political Life Across the Borders of Settler States. She has also won multiple teaching awards from Columbia University, including the Mark Van Doren Award making her the second anthropologist to win the honour. She is a citizen of the Kahnawà:ke Mohawk Nation.

== Education ==
Simpson completed her BA in anthropology from Concordia University in 1993. She subsequently joined the MA program in Anthropology at McGill University.

She received her PhD in anthropology from McGill in 2004 for her dissertation, To the Reserve and Back Again: Kahnawake Mohawk Narratives of Self, Home and Nation, supported by Dartmouth College's Charles Eastman Fellowship and the American Anthropological Association's Minority Dissertation Award in 2002. Simpson's thesis explores the "[w]ays in which residence, location, movement and political discourses distill into a mobile and collective 'identity' for the Mohawk of Kahnawake and other Iroquois peoples across the borders on their reserves and the states that surround them."

During her studies, Simpson was involved in the 'white feminist movement' in Brooklyn, New York. She used feminist language to describe the gendered landscape around her. However, she grew frustrated as her peers involved in the movement were largely concerned with abortion and fair wages. These were disconnected from Indigenous women's experiences and rights and eschewed feminism altogether. At her home in Kahnawake, the gender discrimination stemming from the Indian Act had grave impact. Therefore, she got involved in the local chapter of the Native Women's Association of Canada to seek change. On these decisions, Simpson reflects, "I stopped being the other kind of feminist and I just started being a responsible Mohawk."

== Academic career and research ==
Following the completion of her PhD, Simpson received the Provost's Diversity Post-Doctoral Fellowship at Cornell University. Shortly after, she was hired to Cornell's Anthropology Department and American Indian Program, where she stayed for three years.

In July 2008 Simpson joined Columbia University as an assistant professor of anthropology, refusing untenured cross appointment within the university until she was tenured. Nonetheless, she supported the university's Center for the Study of Ethnicity and Race from her initial months. She continues her association with the center as one of two core Indigenous faculty members (since 2021 with Michael Witgen of the Red Cliff Band of Lake Superior Ojibwe). From 2008, Simpson was the sole Native American faculty member at Columbia until Kānaka Maoli ethnomusicologist Kevin A. Fellezs joined the faculty of the Music Department in 2012.

Simpson's dissertation formed the basis of her first book, Mohawk Interruptus: Political Life Across the Borders of Settler States, published in 2014 by Duke University Press and launched in Kahnawá:ke in July of that year. The book, now on its thirteenth printing, interrogates settler colonial and anthropological practices in the United States and Canada that have circumscribed Iroquoian identities to ignore "contested interpretations of indigeneity" and erase Indigenous nationhood. In the text, Simpson develops the concepts of nested sovereignty and refusal, examining the existence of Indigenous sovereignties within settler national ones and the potential for Indigenous refusals of these latter as an alternative to seeking recognition. The American political theorist Kennan Ferguson writes that unlike resistance, refusal for Simpson "interrupts the smooth operation of power, denying presumed authority and remaking ignored narratives. [...] Where resistance looks for lacuna and interruptions in the constancy of power, refusal denies its very legitimacy."

Mohawk Interruptus has been well-received and widely cited, garnering multiple awards and honorable mentions. In 2014, the book received an Honourable Mention for the Delmos Jones and Jagna Sharif Memorial Book Prize presented by Critical Study of North America from the Society for the Anthropology of North America (part of the American Anthropological Association) and was a "Choice Academic Book" for 2014. In 2015, the book won major prizes in three disciplines: the Lora Romero Best First Book Publication Prize from the American Studies Association, the First Book Prize given by the Native American and Indigenous Studies Association (NAISA), and the Sharon Stephens Prize from the American Ethnological Society. To date, the book has been reviewed in over two dozen academic journals spanning many fields, including in American Anthropologist, American Ethnologist, Journal of the Royal Anthropological Institute, Native American and Indigenous Studies, Theory & Event, Wíčazo Ša Review, and Wasafari. Ngāti Pūkenga Professor Brendan Hokowhitu praised the book's portrayal of "the complexities of Indigenous life" with "neither the security of romanticization nor the comfort of the scholarly pulpit". Arizona State University Professor David Martínez (Akimel O'odham/Hia Ced O'odham/Mexican) wrote that Mohawk Interruptus "will assert its place in the Haudenosaunee canon, which will compel subsequent scholars to take a closer look at how Indigenous communities in general struggle to maintain their political integrity under the pressure of a variety of colonially created borders and the laws that enforce them over the sovereign rights of others."

Simpson has contributed to Indigenous feminist thought through a series of articles and keynote lectures on subjects including the relationship between gender and Indigenous status and violence towards and murder of Indigenous women. In her study of former Attawapiskat First Nation Chief Theresa Spence's 2012-2013 hunger strike and the 2014 murder of Inuk woman Loretta Saunders, Simpson argues that Indigenous women "have been deemed killable, rapeable, expendable" by settler colonial societies.

In 2017, Simpson was appointed to New York City's Mayoral Advisory Commission on City Art, Monuments, and Markers, convened to respond to protests around public commemoration in the city.

Simpson has spoken out in the press against false claims to Indigeneity by white academics and public figures like Elizabeth Hoover and Mary Ellen Turpel-Lafond, including in interviews with Spectrum News NY1, CBC's The National, and Wisconsin Public Radio. Simpson situates these false claims within a long history of colonial theft and "playing Indian."

Simpson has won multiple teaching awards from Columbia University, and was the second anthropologist to win the Mark Van Doren Award for Teaching in the prize's history.

== Bibliography ==
=== Books ===
- Mohawk Interruptus: Political Life Across the Borders of Settler States. Durham, NC: Duke University Press, 2014.

=== Edited volumes ===
- Simpson, Audra; Smith, Andrea. Theorizing Native Studies. Durham, NC: Duke University Press, 2014.

=== Articles ===
- "Rethinking Indigeneity: Scholarship at the Intersection of Native American Studies and Anthropology," co-authored with Jessica Cattelino, Annual Reviews in Anthropology (51 (2022). 365 – 81.
- "The Sovereignty of Critique." South Atlantic Quarterly 119:4 (2020). 685 – 699.
- "The Ruse of Consent and the Anatomy of Refusal: Cases from Indigenous America and Australia" Postcolonial Studies 20 (2017). 1 – 16.
- "Consent's Revenge." Cultural Anthropology 31:3 (2016). 326 – 333.
- "The State is a Man: Theresa Spence, Loretta Saunders and the Gendered Costs of Settler Sovereignty" Theory & Event 19:4 (2016).
- "Settlement's Secret." Cultural Anthropology 26:2 (2011). 205 – 17.
- "Captivating Eunice: Membership, Colonialism and Gendered Citizenships of Grief." Wíčazo Ša Review 24:2 (2009). 105 – 129.
- "Subjects of Sovereignty: Indigeneity, The Revenue Rule and Juridics of Failed Consent." Law and Contemporary Problems 71 (Summer 2008). 189 – 213.
- "From White into Red: Captivity Narratives as Alchemies of Race and Citizenship." American Quarterly 60:2 (2008). 251 – 7.
- "On Ethnographic Refusal: Indigeneity, 'Voice' and Colonial Citizenship." Junctures: The Journal for Thematic Dialogue 9 (2007). 67 – 80.
- "Introduction: Au delà de la tradition des études iroquoises traditionelles" [translated from English by Dominque Legros] Recherches amerindiennes au Québec XXIX:2 (1999). 3 – 9.

=== Book Chapters ===
- "Consent's Revenge" in Anthropological Theory for the 21st Century: A Critical Approach, A. Lynn Bolles, R. Gomberg-Muñoz, B. Perley, K. Vacanti Brondo, eds. Toronto: University of Toronto Press, 2022. Pp. 385 – 93.
- "The State is a Man" in Race, Coloniality, and (In)Justice in the Canadian Academy: Counting for Nothing? Sunera Thobani, ed. Toronto: University of Toronto Press, 2022. Pp. 136 – 62.
- "The State is a Man" in Gender in Society Reader. Amy Kaler, ed. Oxford: Oxford University Press, 2021. Pp. 354 – 60.
- "Sovereignty, Sympathy and Indigeneity" in Ethnographies of U.S. Empire. Carole Anne McGranaghan and John Collins, eds. Durham: Duke University Press, 2018. Pp. 72 – 90.
- "Why White People Love Franz Boas or, The Grammar of Indigenous Dispossession" in Indigenous Visions: Rediscovering the World of Franz Boas. Ned Blackhawk and Isaiah Wilner, eds. New Haven: Yale University Press, 2018. Pp. 166 – 181.
- "At the Crossroads of Constraint: Competing Moral Visions in Grande's Red Pedagogy." 10 Year Anniversary Edition of Red Pedagogy: Native American Social and Political Thought, Sandy Grande. Rowman & Littlefield, 2015. Pp. 79 – 82.
- "On Ethnographic Refusal: Indigeneity, 'Voice' and Colonial Citizenship" in Racism, Colonialism and the Indigenous Peoples of Canada. Martin Cannon and Lina Sunseri, eds. Oxford: Oxford University Press, 2011.
- "Paths Toward a Mohawk Nation: Narratives of Citizenship and Nationhood in Kahnawake" in The Indigenous Experience: Global Perspectives, Roger C.A. Maaka and Chris Andersen (eds). Toronto: Canadian Scholar's Press, 2006. Pp. 174 – 188.
- "Paths Toward a Mohawk Nation: Narratives of Citizenship and Nationhood in Kahnawake." Duncan Ivison, Paul Patton and Will Sanders, eds. Political Theory and the Rights of Indigenous Peoples. Cambridge: Cambridge University Press, 2000. Pp. 113 – 136.
