= Caroline Phillips (archaeologist) =

New Zealand archaeologist (1949- )

Dr Caroline Phillips
- Occupation(s): Honorary Research Fellow (Anthropology), University of Auckland

Academic background
- Education: University of Auckland
- Thesis: The archaeology of Maori occupation along the Waihou River, Hauraki (1994)

Academic work
- Discipline: New Zealand Archaeology
- Website: http://carolinephillips-archaeology.co.nz/

Caroline Anne Phillips is a New Zealand archaeologist. She has lectured at the University of Auckland and Te Whare Wananga o Awanuiarangi.

== Life ==
Phillips began her career in archaeology as a fieldworker, working on surveys and excavations. Much of her work was on Māori sites. In 1987 she completed a master's degree at the University of Auckland on the Karikari Peninsula, in the far north of New Zealand. In 1994 she completed a doctoral degree from the same university, studying Māori settlements on the Waihou River.

== Selected publications ==
- Waihou Journeys: The Archaeology of 400 Years of Maori Settlement (Auckland University Press, 2000)
- Bridging the Divide: Indigenous Communities and Archaeology into the 21st Century (co-editor; 2010)
- Archaeology at Opita: Three Hundred Years of Continuity and Change (co-author, 2013)
