= Amohaere Tangitū =

New Zealand Māori health administrator

Amohaere Tangitū MNZM
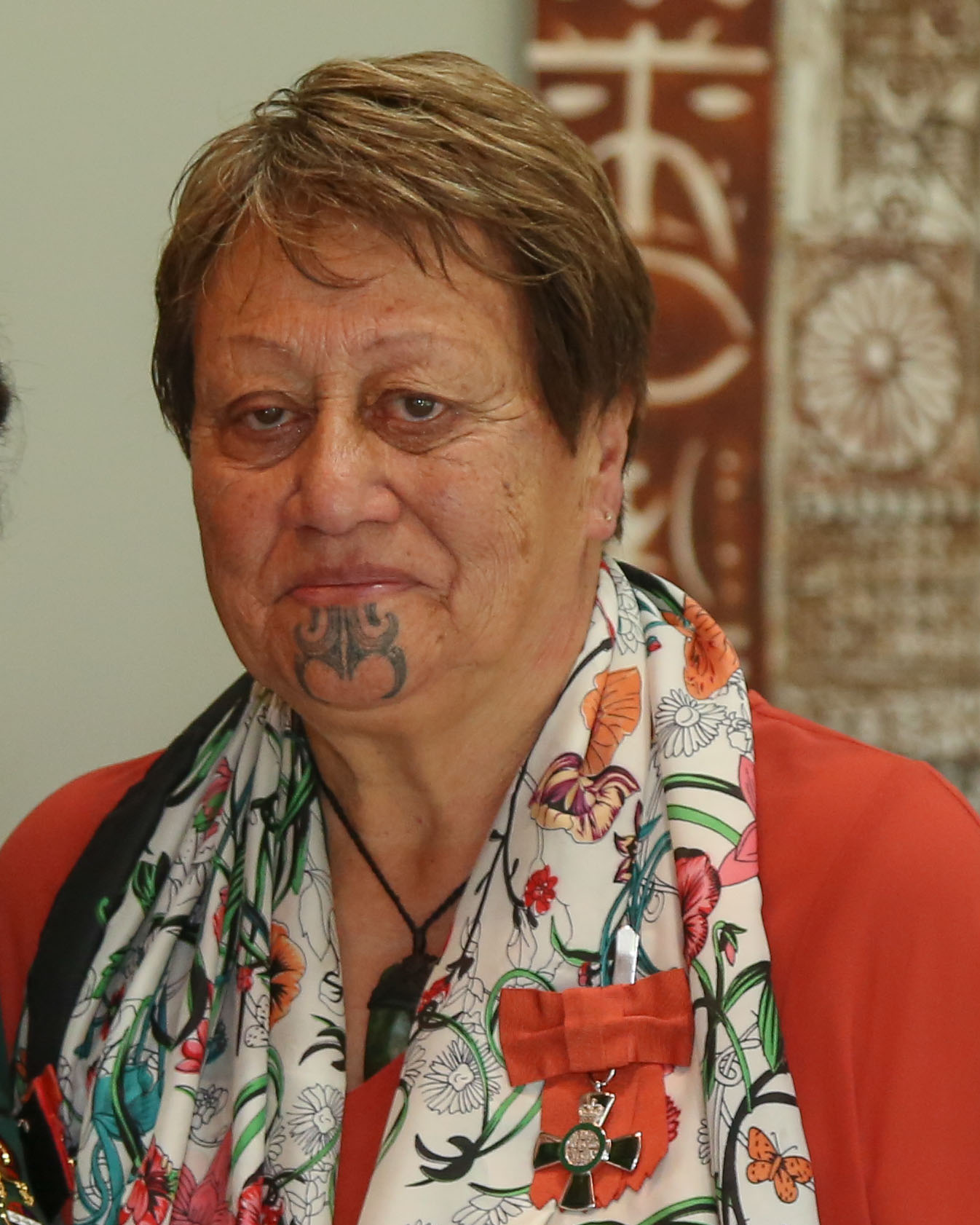
- Awards: Member of the New Zealand Order of Merit

Amohaere Judith Tangitū MNZM is a New Zealand health administrator and advocate for cultural awareness and safety in the health system. In 2024 Tangitū was appointed a Member of the New Zealand Order of Merit for services to Māori health.

== Career ==
Tangitū is Māori and affiliates to Ngāti Awa, Te Arawa, Ngāi Te Rangi, Ngāti Ranginui, and Ngāti Maniapoto iwi. She first worked as a nurse aide in Kawerau Maternity Hospital in the 1960s, before training as a nurse.

Tangitū trained as a nurse, and had six children. She described how as a young mother she told the visiting Plunket nurse to go away seven times. The nurse was not Māori and Tangitū did not feel culturally safe with her. Tangitū went on to work in the health service, advocating for cultural awareness and safety. She was the Bicultural Parent Liaison Officer at Princess Mary Hospital in Auckland, where she was instrumental in establishing the Princess Mary Hospital Whanāu House for families to stay in during their children's treatment. Tangitū was involved in the planning and design of Starship Hospital, which was New Zealand's first purpose-built national hospital for children. In 1999 Tangitū was the Senior Manager of Māori Health at the Bay of Plenty District Health Board, and from 2010 until her retirement in 2018, she was director of Regional Māori Health Services.

Tangitū served on the board of Plunket New Zealand for six years, was on the board of Alzheimers New Zealand, and is co-chair of Eastern Bay Villages. She has also acted as a cultural consultant to New Zealand Red Cross, and iwi consultant at Rotorua Hospital.

Bradford Haami wrote a biography of Tangitū, Bringing culture into care, which was published by Huia Press in 2019.

== Honours and awards ==
In the 2024 King's Birthday Honours, Tangitū was appointed a Member of the New Zealand Order of Merit for services to Māori health. Te Whare Wananga o Awanuiarangi awarded Tangitū the title of Distinguished Fellow – Māori Health Sciences (Nursing).
