= Decolonizing Methodologies =

Book by Linda Tuhiwai Smith

Decolonizing Methodologies: Research and Indigenous Peoples
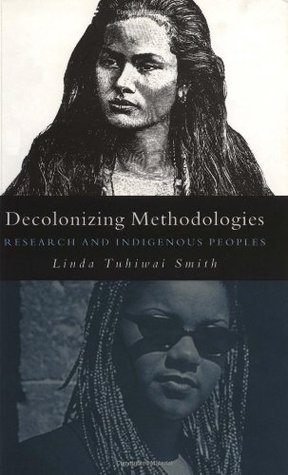
- First edition cover
- Author: Linda Tuhiwai Smith
- Genre: Non-fiction
- Publisher: Zed Books
- Publication date: 1999
- Publication place: New Zealand
- ISBN: 978 1 85649 624 7

Decolonizing Methodologies: Research and Indigenous Peoples is a book by New Zealand academic Linda Tuhiwai Smith. Originally published in 1999, Decolonizing Methodologies is a foundational text in Indigenous studies that explores the intersections of colonialism and research methodologies.

== Summary ==
The book begins with the line "The word itself, 'research', is probably one of the dirtiest words in the indigenous world's vocabulary." Smith contends that Western paradigms of research are "inextricably linked to European imperialism and colonialism."

The book contains an overview of Māori research outlining Māori cultural values and attitudes development to create a research framework that supports research by Māori scholars in Māori subject areas.

Smith concludes the book by articulating how she believes kaupapa (Note: The term kaupapa, meaning the guiding beliefs and principles which act as a base or foundation for behaviour, is also widely used to refer to Māori cultural values.) Māori research methods could be implemented.

== Impact and reception ==
Decolonizing Methodologies offers a vision of kaupapa Māori research that has been enormously influential. Ranginui Walker described the book as "a dynamic interpretation of power relations of domination, struggle and emancipation". Laurie Anne Whitt praised the book as a "powerful critique of dominant research methodologies."

Linda Tuhiwai Smith was awarded the top honour the Rutherford Medal in 2023 by the New Zealand science academy Royal Society Te Apārangi. They said: "Decolonising Methodologies, Research and Indigenous Peoples (1999) has had a profound influence across the social sciences."

The book has been translated into five languages. It is widely referenced by other scholars and by the end of 2023 it had been cited 283,000 times.

New Zealand historian Peter Munz decried the book's political agenda, noting "what the author calls 'colonising' research amounts to nothing more than subjecting a culture’s parochial self-image to critical scrutiny. Such research is emancipatory in the sense that it is likely to weaken old habits and beliefs and encourage the parochial society’s smooth transition into a wider, possibly global, community. To call it 'colonising' is nothing less than emotional politics".

A review by Carla Wilson at the New Zealand Government agency Ministry of Social Development explores the book with a lens of how non-indigenous and Pākehā researchers may be guided in research with indigenous communities. Wilson's review states the prime focus of the book is on "'insider' research within indigenous communities", so did not address this question in detail, and found the book had "a valuable reminder of the need to reflect on, and be critical of, one's own culture, values, assumptions and beliefs and to recognise these are not the 'norm'".

In 2021 the Spanish translation of the book, A descolonizar metodologías, published by LOM was brought by Elisa Loncón to the "plurinational library" of the Constitutional Convention of Chile.

In 2025 Decolonizing Methodologies was recognised in Books of Mana as one of the 180 most significant works of Māori-authored non-fiction.

== See also ==
- Critical theory
- Decolonization
- Decolonization of knowledge
- Tikanga Māori
