= Graham Smith (Māori academic) =

New Zealand Māori academic

Graham Smith CNZM FRSNZ
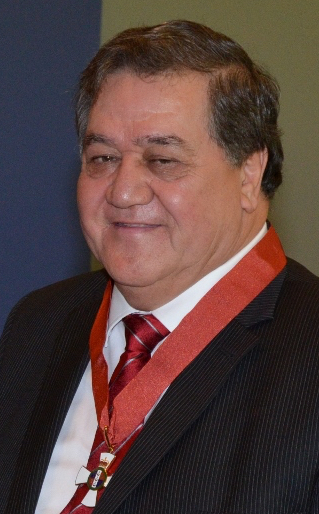
- Smith in 2014
- Born: Graham Hingangaroa Smith; 1950 (age 75–76)
- Spouse: Linda Tuhiwai Smith

Academic background
- Education: University of Auckland
- Thesis: The development of kaupapa Maori: theory and praxis (1997)

Academic work
- Institutions: Te Whare Wānanga o Awanuiārangi; University of Auckland
- Doctoral students: Makere Stewart-Harawira

Graham Hingangaroa Smith CNZM FRSNZ (born 1950) is a New Zealand Māori academic and educationalist of Ngāti Porou, Ngāi Tahu, Ngāti Apa and Ngāti Kahungunu descent. He is a Fellow of the Royal Society Te Apārangi.

== Career ==
Smith grew up with his grandmother in the Wairarapa region. He received a scholarship to a private boarding school in Auckland, which led to university and a teaching career.

After a Diploma of Teaching and a PhD at the University of Auckland, he was Pro Vice-Chancellor (Māori) there for five years. He is now CEO and vice-chancellor at Te Whare Wānanga o Awanuiārangi. He is also a principal investigator at Ngā Pae o te Māramatanga.

Notable doctoral students of Smith include Makere Stewart-Harawira.

== Honours and awards ==
In the 2014 Queen's Birthday Honours, Smith was appointed a Companion of the New Zealand Order of Merit for services to Māori and education. In March 2021, Smith was elected a Fellow of the Royal Society Te Apārangi, recognising his "research and practice have been foundational to the development of Kaupapa Māori theorizing and 'transforming praxis'".

In 2026, Smith was awarded Te Puāwaitanga Research Excellence Medal by the Royal Society Te Apārangi.

== Personal life ==
He is married to fellow academic Linda Tuhiwai Smith.

== Publications ==
- The development of kaupapa Maori: Theory and praxis. 1997.
- Indigenous struggle for the transformation of education and schooling. 2003.
- Protecting and respecting indigenous knowledge. Chapter by Smith, Graham Hingangaroa in: Reclaiming Indigenous voice and vision, 2000.
- Reform and Maori educational crisis: A grand illusion. 1991.
- "Do you guys hate Aucklanders too?" Youth: voicing difference from the rural heartland. 2002.
