= Albert Schweitzer's Legacy for Education: Reverence for Life =

2011 book by A. G. Rud

- Cover
- Author: A. G. Rud
- Subject: Albert Schweitzer, philosophy of education
- Publisher: Palgrave Macmillan
- Publication date: December 14, 2010
- Pages: 173
- ISBN: 978-0-230-10856-1
- OCLC: 587113269

Albert Schweitzer's Legacy for Education: Reverence for Life is a 2011 book by American philosopher of education and author Anthony Gordon Rud. It is the first monograph devoted to the study of German polymath Albert Schweitzer's philosophy and work in relation to education. The book is divided into two parts: the first examines Schweitzer's biography, philosophical influences, and the development of his ethical principle of Reverence for Life; the second applies these ideas to educational theory and practice, introducing the concept of "practical reverence" as a framework for teaching, learning, and school leadership. Rud studied Schweitzer's autobiographical writings, his recently translated correspondence with his wife Hélène Bresslau, and the work of thinkers including Immanuel Kant, Johann Wolfgang von Goethe, and John Dewey. The book also addresses criticisms of Schweitzer, especially regarding colonialism, and surveys various educational initiatives inspired by his philosophy.

== Author ==
In a video published by Washington State University's College of Education, Rud discussed the book's central arguments. He noted that most people know Schweitzer only vaguely as a white-clad doctor in the African jungle who won the Nobel Peace Prize, but that what made Schweitzer remarkable was his decision to leave a comfortable life as a pastor, scholar, and musician at age thirty to train as a physician and establish a hospital in Africa. Rud described practical reverence as an attitude of "awe, respect, wonder and connection" that could be brought to work with students, teachers, and educational leaders. He argued that if Schweitzer's ideas took hold in American schools, education would emphasize human connections within the natural world and within social structures, and would recognize schools as part of a broader community ecology rather than as institutions separate from society.

== Summary ==
The book represents the first monograph devoted to studying the thought and work of Albert Schweitzer in education. The book is organized into two parts: the first reconstructs Schweitzer's life, influences, and convictions, while the second applies these to educational theory and practice.

The opening portion traces Schweitzer's formative years in Alsace, showing how his upbringing as the son of a Lutheran pastor, his sensitivity to animal suffering as a child, and his philosophical training shaped his later commitments. Rud devotes considerable space to Schweitzer's intellectual heritage, moving through his engagement with Kant's moral philosophy, Goethe's ideas about reverence and action, Schopenhauer's concept of the will, and Nietzsche's cultural criticism. Rud makes use of the recently translated letters between Schweitzer and Hélène Bresslau, his wife, to show how Schweitzer's ideals took shape through their decade-long correspondence. He argues that Hélène helped transform Schweitzer from someone who wished to help into what their daughter Rhena would later describe as "the man of action who knew his path."

Much of the book centers on Schweitzer's ethical principle of Reverence for Life, which came to Schweitzer during a 1913 journey up the Ogooué River as he sat on a barge at sunset, passing through a herd of hippopotamuses. Rud traces this principle to multiple traditions, including Christianity, Western philosophy, and Indian thought, especially the Jainist doctrine of ahimsa (nonviolence and noninjury toward all living things). The principle holds that moral concern extends beyond human beings to all life, and that humans are interdependent with rather than dominant over nature. Rud connects this to what Schweitzer called "ethical mysticism," a sense that all life is sacred and connected, noting that Schweitzer articulated these ideas half a century before the modern environmental movement.

The book presents Schweitzer's relevance to education as operating on three levels: his exemplary life of service, selected themes from his thought, and his overall ethics. Rud develops the concept of "practical reverence" as an educational ideal, based on philosopher Paul Woodruff's analysis of reverence as a virtue while connecting it to classroom teaching, school leadership, and institutional culture. For teachers, practical reverence implies cultivating in themselves and their students a sense of reverence for truth, personal fulfillment, and respect for all life. For administrators, it implies creative leadership in pursuing moral and intellectual ideals beyond mandated testing. Rud also links Schweitzer's ideas to John Dewey's concept of "natural piety," arguing that both thinkers recognized humans as nested within nature rather than separate from it, and both rejected the reduction of education to mechanical transmission of information.

The author then addresses criticisms of Schweitzer, including charges of paternalism and colonialism in his African work. He undertakes what he calls a "recovery project," distinguishing between the hagiographic image of Schweitzer as the kindly jungle doctor and the more complicated historical figure. Based on Karl Jaspers's concept of "paradigmatic individuals" and David Purpel's notion of the prophetic teacher, Rud positions Schweitzer less as a model to imitate than as a beacon by which to gain orientation.

The final chapters survey educational initiatives inspired by Schweitzer, including schools bearing his name and curricula developed around his philosophy. Rud acknowledges that Schweitzer's influence on educational practice remains partial and scattered, but argues that his example offers educators a vision of teaching grounded in hospitality, community, and service.

== Reviews ==
Mike W. Martin of Chapman University described the book as "masterful and beautifully written." Martin found that Rud's concept of practical reverence offered applications for both teachers, administrators, and academic communities seeking to express reverence for education through rituals, celebrations, and engagement with Schweitzer's writings. He noted that Rud treated Schweitzer's environmental thought as a central theme, pointing out that Schweitzer had placed reverence for all living creatures at the heart of his ethics decades before the modern environmental movement. While Rud presented Schweitzer as exemplary, Martin observed that the book also treated his flaws as instructive, particularly his complicated reflections on colonialism and the personal sacrifices his mission imposed on his family.

J. A. Helfer argued that Schweitzer belonged on any list of important thinkers relevant to education and that Rud succeeded in explaining and extending the ideas of someone who cared deeply for people. For Helfer, the book's two-part structure effectively guided readers from Schweitzer's formative experiences through to applications in contemporary educational practice. He recommended the work for upper-division undergraduate, graduate, and research collections.
