= Elizabeth McKinley =

New Zealand academic

Elizabeth McKinley ONZM
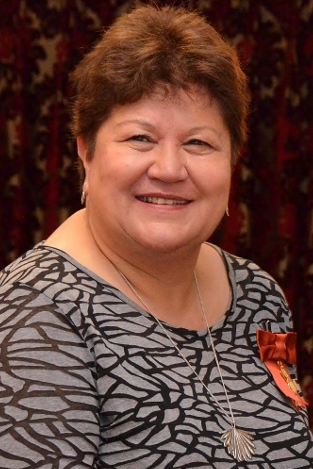
- McKinley in 2015
- Education: University of Waikato
- Scientific career
- Fields: Educational research
- Workplaces: University of Auckland; University of Melbourne
- Thesis: Brown bodies, white coats: postcolonialism, Māori women and science (2003)
- Doctoral advisor: Sue Middleton
- Doctoral students: Melinda Webber, Georgina Stewart

Elizabeth Ann McKinley ONZM CRSNZ is a New Zealand academic and as of 2019 is a full professor at the University of Melbourne.

== Academic career ==
After a 2003 PhD titled Brown Bodies, White Coats: Postcolonialism, Māori Women and Science at the University of Waikato, McKinley moved to the University of Auckland, rising to full professor and moving to the University of Melbourne.

In the 2015 Queen's Birthday Honours, McKinley was appointed an Officer of the New Zealand Order of Merit, for services to education and Māori. In 2026, she was elected a Companion of the Royal Society Te Apārangi, for "her sustained and outstanding leadership in Māori and indigenous education".

Notable doctoral students include Melinda Webber and Georgina Stewart.

== Selected works ==
- McKinley, Elizabeth. "Locating the global: Culture, language and science education for indigenous students." International journal of science Education 27, no. 2 (2005): 227–241.
- Mckinley, Elizabeth. "Postcolonialism, indigenous students, and science education." In Handbook of research on science education, pp. 213–240. Routledge, 2013.
- Carr, Malcolm, Clive McGee, Alister Jones, Elizabeth McKinley, Beverley Bell, Hugh Barr, and Tina Simpson. "The effects of curricula and assessment on pedagogical approaches and on educational outcomes." (2005).
- McKinley, Elizabeth, Pauline McPherson Waiti, and Beverley Bell. "Language, culture and science education." International Journal of Science Education 14, no. 5 (1992): 579–595.
- McKinley, Elizabeth. "Brown bodies, white coats: Postcolonialism, Maori women and science." Discourse: studies in the cultural politics of education 26, no. 4 (2005): 481–496.

== Personal life ==
McKinley is Māori of Ngāti Kahungunu ki Wairarapa and Ngāi Tahu descent.
