= Nesta Devine =

New Zealand professor of education

- Born: 1947 (age 78–79); England
- Education: University of Auckland
- Scientific career
- Workplaces: Schools, University of Waikato, Auckland University of Technology
- Thesis: An Investigation into 'Public Choice' Theory and its Implications for Education in New Zealand (2000)
- Doctoral students: Georgina Stewart

Nesta Devine (born 1947) is a New Zealand education academic. She is currently a full professor at the Auckland University of Technology.

== Academic career ==
Devine has a 2000 PhD titled 'An Investigation into 'Public Choice' Theory and its Implications for Education in New Zealand' from the University of Auckland. She has taught in schools, the University of Waikato and Auckland University of Technology, rising to full professor.

Notable students of Devine's include Georgina Stewart, Professor of Māori Philosophy of Education at Auckland University of Technology.

== Selected works ==
- Devine, Nesta. Education and public choice: A critical account of the invisible hand in education. Greenwood Publishing Group, 2004.
- Devine, Nesta, and Ruth Irwin. "Autonomy, agency and education: He tangata, he tangata, he tangata." Educational Philosophy and Theory 37, no. 3 (2005): 317–331.
- Brown, Tony, Nesta Devine, Elsie Leslie, Margaret Paiti, Emilie Sila'ila'i, Sandra Umaki, and Jay Williams. "Reflective engagement in cultural history: A Lacanian perspective on Pasifika teachers in Aotearoa New Zealand." Pedagogy, Culture & Society 15, no. 1 (2007): 107–118.
- Peters, Michael A., Petar Jandrić, Ruth Irwin, Kirsten Locke, Nesta Devine, Richard Heraud, Andrew Gibbons et al. "Towards a philosophy of academic publishing." Educational Philosophy and Theory 48, no. 14 (2016): 1401–1425.
- Devine, Nesta. "Community, Partnership, and Collaboration." Knowledge Cultures 3, no. 5 (2015): 34–41.
