= Green libertarianism =

Political ideology with mixed green and libertarian beliefs

Green libertarianism is a form of green politics. Alternately, it is a form of libertarianism in which the free market provides environmentally beneficial (or benign) outcomes. Marcel Wissenburg (2009) maintains that proponents of the latter comprise a minority of green political theorists.

== Garvan Walshe ==
In "Green Libertarianism" (2014), Garvan Walshe suggests that the Lockean proviso should account for ecological concerns. In the natural world, all organisms—including humans—acquire (make use of) natural services, which natural resources provide. A green libertarian would preserve Locke's proviso—that a human may acquire natural services as long as it does not deprive or harm another—while acknowledging that not all natural services are abundant, and that the world is ecologically limited. Furthermore, green libertarians recognize that people cannot be used as natural services without their consent.

Likewise, people cannot be deprived of their share of natural services without their consent. In cases where natural services may be commodified, people are free to use their individual shares of a natural service as they see fit, but a person exceeding this share must negotiate with others to draw from their shares. Walshe uses an example of building a turbine along a river that might reduce others' share of the water (for example, by contaminating some of the water), but produces electricity that could compensate for the loss, so that ultimately the turbine violates no one's rights to the water. Walshe postulates that there are very few natural services which are not or cannot be commodified.

Walshe's view of green libertarianism attempts to address criticisms of both right- and left-libertarianism. Walshe departs from right-libertarianism—specifically, Robert Nozick's interpretation of Locke's proviso—by proposing that, in a state of ecological equilibrium, no one may use natural services without the consent of others (for example, through persuasion or bargaining), and all persons enjoy equal rights of acquisition (if not economic equality). At the same time, Walshe departs from left-libertarianism—such as Hillel Steiner's assertion that all persons are entitled to equal shares of natural resources—by asserting that population growth, whether through immigration or births, upsets ecological equilibrium and that (voluntary) immigrants, and the parents of children, are responsible for not impinging upon others' rights to acquire natural services. Walshe maintains that both limitations encourage innovations in which natural services are used as efficiently as possible.
