= Linda Tuhiwai Smith =

New Zealand academic (born 1950)

Linda Tuhiwai Smith CNZM
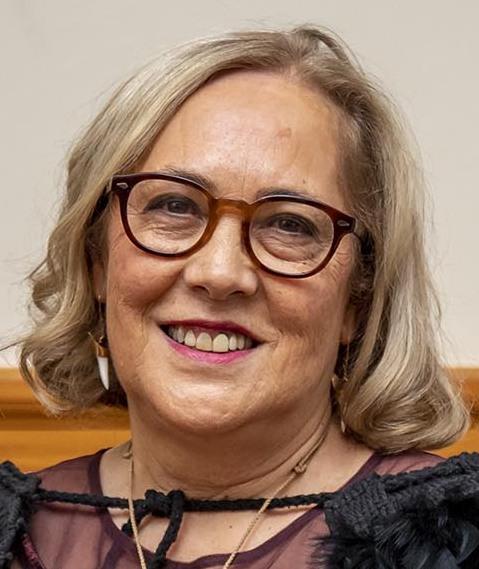
- Smith in 2023
- Born: 1950 (age 75–76); Whakatāne, New Zealand
- Spouse: Graham Smith
- Relatives: Sidney Moko Mead (father)

Academic background
- Education: University of Auckland
- Thesis: Ngā aho o te kakahu matauranga: the multiple layers of struggle by Maori in education. (1996)
- Influences: Ngũgĩ wa Thiong'o, Frantz Fanon, Malcolm X, Paulo Freire

Linda Tuhiwai Te Rina Smith CNZM (née Mead; born 1950), previously a professor of indigenous education at the University of Waikato in Hamilton, New Zealand, is now a distinguished professor at Te Whare Wānanga o Awanuiārangi. Smith's academic work is about decolonising knowledge and systems. The Royal Society Te Apārangi describes Smith’s influence on education as creating "intellectual spaces for students and researchers to embrace their identities and transcend dominant narratives."

== Early life and education ==
Smith was born in Whakatāne, New Zealand. Her father is Sidney Moko Mead of Ngāti Awa, also a professor, and her mother is June Te Rina Mead, née Walker, of Ngāti Porou. She was given the name Tuhiwai as an adult. Smith affiliates with the Māori iwi Ngāti Awa and Ngāti Porou from the east cape of the North Island in New Zealand.

When Smith was a teenager, she moved to the United States while her father was completing his PhD. Her family lived in southern Illinois and she attended Carbondale Community High School. Smith later moved to Salem, Massachusetts, where she worked as an assistant at the Peabody Museum of Salem, typing labels in the basement.

In the 1970s, Smith was a founding member of the activist group Ngā Tamatoa. She was influenced by the writings of Malcolm X and Frantz Fanon. Her role in Ngā Tamatoa was to communicate with Māori people about the Treaty of Waitangi. Smith saw education as the most important part the Maori struggle for freedom. She was a member of Ngā Tamatoa while a university student.

Smith earned her BA, MA (honours), and PhD degrees at the University of Auckland. Her 1996 thesis was titled Ngā aho o te kakahu matauranga: the multiple layers of struggle by Maori in education.

== Career ==
Smith is the pro-vice-chancellor Māori, dean of the School of Māori and Pacific Development, and director of Te Kotahi Research Institute at the University of Waikato.

Smith's book Decolonizing Methodologies: Research and Indigenous Peoples was first published in 1999.

In the 2013 New Year Honours, Smith was appointed a Companion of the New Zealand Order of Merit for services to Māori and education. In 2017, Smith was selected as one of the Royal Society Te Apārangi's "150 women in 150 words", celebrating the contributions of women to knowledge in New Zealand.

In November 2016 she was appointed a member of the Waitangi Tribunal. In the same year she retired, she was named pro-vice-chancellor Māori and took a short-term contract as Professor of Māori and Indigenous Studies in the newly formed Faculty of Māori and Indigenous Studies.

In September 2020 the hashtag #BecauseOfLindaTuhiwaiSmith went viral when Smith was one of a group of academics who wrote an open letter to the Ministry of Education on racism in education and news came out that her contract would not be renewed. A report commissioned by the University of Waikato into claims in the letter found that the institution is structurally discriminatory against Māori but did not support other claims in the letter.

In 2021, Smith joined Te Whare Wānanga o Awanuiārangi as a distinguished professor. She became the first Māori scholar to be elected into the American Academy of Arts and Sciences in 2021.

The Rutherford Medal, the top honour from the Royal Society Te Apārangi, was awarded to Smith in 2023 "for her preeminent role in advancing education and research for Te Ao Māori, her groundbreaking scholarship in decolonisation of research methodologies, and her pioneering contribution to transforming research for Indigenous Peoples globally." She said of this award: "I think it’s important for us for Māori, for indigenous peoples, to have our knowledge recognised, and to occupy and create spaces inside the big institutions of knowledge."

In 2023 she was also awarded the Prime Minister's award for non-fiction, in which she was cited as "the first wahine Māori to receive the Non-fiction award".

=== Decolonizing Methodologies ===
Smith is the author of Decolonizing Methodologies: Research and Indigenous Peoples (Zed Books, 1999, 2012, and 2021), a critical analysis of the role of Western scholarly research in the process of colonization of indigenous peoples. This work is considered a major contribution to research methods in social justice research. In a 2023 news item, the Royal Society Te Apārangi noted it has been translated into five languages and has 283,000 citations to date. In 2025 it was selected as one of the 180 most significant works of Māori-authored non-fiction through inclusion in Books of Mana.

== Personal life ==
Smith is married to fellow academic Graham Smith.

== Selected works ==
- Smith, Linda Tuhiwai. Decolonizing methodologies: Research and indigenous peoples. Zed Books, 1999.
- Denzin, Norman K.; Yvonna S. Lincoln; and Linda Tuhiwai Smith, eds. Handbook of critical and indigenous methodologies. Sage, 2008.
- Smith, Linda Tuhiwai. "On tricky ground: Researching the native in the age of uncertainty." In N. Denzin and Y. Lincoln (eds.), The Sage handbook of qualitative research (2005): 85-107.
- Smith, Linda Tuhiwai. "Kaupapa Māori research." In M. Battiste (ed.), Reclaiming indigenous voice and vision (2000): 225–247.
- Cram, Fiona, Linda Smith, and Wayne Johnstone. Mapping the themes of Māori talk about health. (2003).
- Smith, Linda Tuhiwai. "Building a research agenda for indigenous epistemologies and education." Anthropology & Education Quarterly 36, no. 1 (2005): 93–95.
