= Educational Philosophy and Theory =

Peer-reviewed philosophy journal

- Discipline: Educational philosophy
- Language: English
- Edited by: Marek Tesar and Liz Jackson

Publication details
- History: 1969–present
- Publisher: Taylor & Francis
- Frequency: 14/year
- Impact factor: 0.864 (2017)

Standard abbreviations
- ISO 4: Educ. Philos. Theory

Indexing
- ISSN: 0013-1857 (print); 1469-5812 (web)
- LCCN: 2007233738
- OCLC no.: 924716052

Links
- Journal homepage; Online access; Online archive

Educational Philosophy and Theory is a peer-reviewed philosophy journal covering educational theory and the philosophy of education. It was established in 1969 by Les Brown (University of New South Wales), with its first issue being published in May of that year. It went on to become the official journal of the Philosophy of Education Society of Australasia, which was founded the following year. It is published fourteen times per year by Taylor & Francis, with Marek Tesar (University of Melbourne) and Liz Jackson (University of Hong Kong) serving as the current editors-in-chief. Michael Adrian Peters (Beijing Normal University) was editor-in-chief until 2023. According to the Journal Citation Reports, the journal has a 2017 impact factor of 1.267, ranking it 177th out of 238 journals in the category "Education & Educational Research".
