= Kura Paul-Burke =

Professor of marine science in New Zealand

Academic background
- Education: Te Whare Wānanga o Awanuiārangi
- Thesis: An investigation into marine management of taonga species in Aotearoa New Zealand: A case study of kutai, perna canaliculus, green-lipped mussels in Ohiwa harbour (2015)

Academic work
- Institutions: University of Waikato, National Institute of Water and Atmospheric Research

Kura Paul-Burke (Ngāti Awa, Ngāti Whakahemo) is a New Zealand Māori marine scientist, and is the first woman Māori professor of marine science at the University of Waikato. Her research focuses on mātauranga Māori and aquaculture.

== Early life and education ==
Paul-Burke whakapapas to Ngāti Awa and Ngāti Whakahemo.

Paul-Burke's interest in environmental science began when she was snorkeling around Whakaari. She quit her job and enrolled at Auckland University of Technology to study for a Bachelor of Applied Science. She then earned a Master of Indigenous studies degree in 2011, with a thesis on surveys of taonga species in Ngāti Awa waters. In 2015, Paul-Burke completed a PhD titled An investigation into marine management of taonga species in Aotearoa New Zealand: A case study of kutai, perna canaliculus, green-lipped mussels in Ohiwa harbour at Te Whare Wānanga o Awanuiārangi.

== Academic career ==
Paul-Burke joined the faculty of the University of Waikato, rising to full professor in 2022. She was the first wahine Māori (Māori woman) professor of marine science appointed at the University of Waikato, and her appointment brought the number of Māori marine professors in New Zealand to three.

During her studies, Paul-Burke noticed a relationship between the cultural diversity of people and marine biodiversity, noting that "areas where indigenous peoples speak their languages and enact their traditional practices are the areas with the highest biodiversity". Her research has shown that mātauranga Māori approaches to marine science can be beneficial. For instance, between 2007 and 2019 the population of green-lipped mussels in Ōhiwa harbour had dropped from 120 million to fewer than 80,000, due to a number of challenges, including the effects of seastars. Working with the Bay of Plenty Council, local iwi and Māori weavers, Paul-Burke used fibre from cabbage tree leaves and flax to replace the normal plastic spat lines, increasing the mussel population to 800,000. In working with iwi on kaitiakitanga approaches to marine conservation, Paul-Burke emphasises the importance of collecting data to make evidence-based decisions.

Paul-Burke is a project leader at the Sustainable Seas National Science Challenge.

Paul-Burke was a semi-finalist in the 2023 Ministry for the Environment’s New Zealand Environmental Hero of the Year.

== Selected works ==
- Clark, Dana Eleanor; Joanne Clapcott; Eleanor M. Gee; Lohrer, Andrew Martin; Kura Paul-Burke; Howard-Williams, Clive (2022). "Transcending boundaries: transitioning toward integrated estuary management in Aotearoa New Zealand". New Zealand Journal of Marine and Freshwater Research. 56 (3): 303–311. doi:10.1080/00288330.2022.2114364. Wikidata Q113852036.
- Kura Paul-Burke (Ngāti Awa, Ngāti Whakahemo); Rokahurihia Ngarimu-Cameron (Te Whānau ā Apanui, Te Whakatōhea); Joe Burke (American); Richard Bulmer (Aotearoa European); Kerry Cameron (Ngāti Kahungungu, Ngāti Porou); Tuwhakairiora O’Brien (Ngāti Awa); Charlie Bluett (Ngāti Awa); Megan Ranapia (Ngāti Awa, Tainui) (2022). "Taura kuku: prioritising Māori knowledge and resources to create biodegradable mussel spat settlement lines for shellfish restoration in Ōhiwa harbour". New Zealand Journal of Marine and Freshwater Research. 56 (3): 570–584. doi:10.1080/00288330.2022.2111447. Wikidata Q115337015.
- Stevens, Craig; Kura Paul-Burke (Ngāti Awa, Ngāti Whakahemo); Russell, Peter (2020). "Pūtahitanga: the intersection of western science and mātauranga Māori in the context of Aotearoa New Zealand's physical oceanography". New Zealand Journal of Marine and Freshwater Research. 55 (1): 249–263. doi:10.1080/00288330.2019.1698621. Wikidata Q115337091.
- Joanne O’Callaghan; Craig Stevens; Moninya Roughan; et al. (2019). "Developing an Integrated Ocean Observing System for New Zealand". Frontiers in Marine Science. 6. doi:10.3389/fmars.2019.00143. Wikidata Q115337299.
- Kura Paul-Burke; Joseph Burke; Charlie Bluett; Tim Senior (2018). "Using Māori knowledge to assist understandings and management of shellfish populations in Ōhiwa harbour, Aotearoa New Zealand". New Zealand Journal of Marine and Freshwater Research. 52 (4): 542–556. doi:10.1080/00288330.2018.1506487. Wikidata Q115337321.
- Kura Paul-Burke; Lesley Rameka (2015). "Kaitiakitanga - Active Guardianship, Responsibilities And Relationships With The World: Towards A Bio-Cultural Future In Early Childhood Education". Encyclopedia of Educational Philosophy and Theory. pp. 1–6. doi:10.1007/978-981-287-532-7_54-1. Wikidata Q123764115.
- Kura Paul-Burke; Tuwhakairiora O'Brien; Joseph Burke; Charlie Bluett (2022). "Mapping Māori knowledge from the past to inform marine management futures". New Zealand Science Review. 76 (1–2): 32–41. doi:10.26686/nzsr.v76i1-2.7831. Wikidata Q123764114.
