= Wiremu Doherty =

Maori educationalist

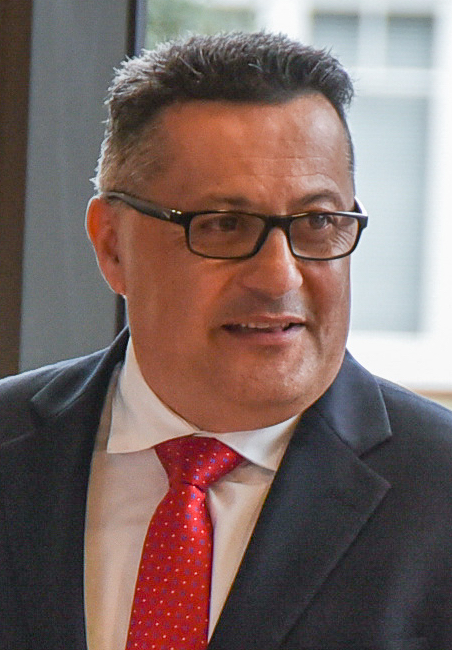
- Doherty in 2019
- Education: University of Auckland
- Scientific career
- Workplaces: Te Whare Wānanga o Awanuiārangi
- Thesis: Mātauranga Tūhoe: the centrality of Mātauranga-a-iwi to Māori education. (2010)

Wiremu Doherty is a New Zealand Māori educationalist and academic of Tūhoe and Ngāti Awa descent. He is the past-principal of the first kaupapa Māori school. He received his PhD in education from the Auckland University in 2010 and is currently a professor at Te Whare Wānanga o Awanuiārangi and chair of the Māori strategy committee for New Zealand Qualifications Authority.
