= David Schlosberg =

American political theorist (born 1963)

David Schlosberg (born November 16, 1963) is an American political theorist who is currently Professor of Environmental Politics at the University of Helsinki. He was previously Director of the Sydney Environment Institute at the University of Sydney. He is a Fellow of the Academy of the Social Sciences of Australia.

== Career ==
Schlosberg earned his Bachelor of Arts in politics and psychology, graduating from the University of California, Santa Cruz with honors in 1985. He then read for a Master of Science and doctorate in political science at the University of Oregon (UO), completing in 1996. In 1996, he started a job in political theory and environmental politics at the Department of Politics and International Affairs, Northern Arizona University (NAU). He was an affiliate at what is now the School of Earth and Sustainability at NAU, chaired the Department of Politics and International Relations, and co-founded and directed the Environmental Studies Program. Schlosberg moved to the University of Sydney in 2011, as Professor of Environmental Politics in the Department of Government and International Relations. There, he co-founded and co-directed the multidisciplinary Sydney Environment Institute. In 2026 he joined the University of Helsinki in a professorship funded by the Finnish Research Council.

== Research ==
Schlosberg's main theoretical interests are in environmental politics, environmental movements, and political theory, and in particular the intersection of the three with his work on environmental justice. In environmental justice studies, he is known for first developing the theoretical framework that encompasses the movement's pluralist concerns about equity, recognition, participation, and capabilities. His other theoretical interests are in climate justice, ecological, and multispecies justice, climate adaptation and resilience, and environmental movements and the practices of everyday life. Schlosberg's more applied work, with local and state governments, includes justice in adaptation and resilience planning, the social impacts of climate change, and community-based food movements and policy.

== Selected publications ==
=== Books ===
- Schlosberg, D. and L. Craven. Sustainable Materialism: Environmental Movements and the Politics of Everyday Life.2019. Oxford: Oxford University Press. (Paperback 2022.)
- Dryzek, J., R Norgaard, D Schlosberg. Climate-Challenged Society. 2013. Oxford: Oxford University Press.
- Schlosberg, D. Defining Environmental Justice: Theories, Movements, and Nature. 2007. Oxford: Oxford University Press. (Paperback 2009.)
- Dryzek, J., D. Downes, C. Hunold, D Schlosberg. Green States and Social Movements: Environmentalism in the United States, Britain, Germany, and Norway. 2003. (Paperback 2004). Oxford: Oxford University Press.
- Schlosberg, D. Environmental Justice and the New Pluralism: The Challenge of Difference for Environmentalism. 1999. Oxford: Oxford University Press. (Paperback 2002.)

=== Edited books ===
- Gabrielson, T., C. Hall, J. Meyer, D. Schlosberg, eds. The Oxford Handbook of Environmental Political Theory. 2016. Oxford: Oxford University Press.
- Wissenburg, M. and D. Schlosberg, eds. Political Animals and Animal Politics. 2014. Basingstoke, UK: Palgrave Macmillan.
- Dryzek, J., R. Norgaard, D Schlosberg, eds. The Oxford Handbook of Climate Change and Society. 2011. Co-edited with Oxford: Oxford University Press.
- Bomberg, E. and D Schlosberg. Environmentalism in the United States: Changing Patterns of Action and Advocacy. 2008. London: Routledge.
- Dryzek, J. and D. Schlosberg. Debating the Earth: The Environmental Politics Reader, 2nd Edition. 2005. Oxford: Oxford University Press. (1st Edition published in 1998.)

== Awards ==
- Research Impact Award 2022, University of Sydney Faculty of Arts and Social Sciences. For the “highly prominent and sustained work of FoodLab Sydney…, clear evidence of impact in a range of diverse communities, and a sophisticated approach to gathering evidence of impact and engagement.”
- Environmental Politics Article of the Year Award 2021. Runner Up. For the article Celermajer, D, D Schlosberg, L Rickards, M Stewart-Harawira, M Thaler, P Tschakert, B Verlie, C Winter. Multispecies Justice: Theories, Challenges, and a Research Agenda for Environmental Politics. Environmental Politics 30, Nos 1-2: 119–140.
- Ruby Payne-Scott Professorial Distinction. University of Sydney 2018–2022. For distinction in research, teaching, collaborative leadership, mentoring, engagement, and commitment to university values.
- Contemporary Political Theory Annual Prize for 2017. For the article, co-authored with Rom Coles, on “The new environmentalism of everyday life: Sustainability, material flows, and movements,” in Contemporary Political Theory, Volume 15, Number 2 (2016), pp. 160–181.
- Northern Arizona University Research and Creative Activity Awards, 2009. “Most Significant Scholarly Work” for Defining Environmental Justice (Oxford 2007).
- Teaching Scholar Award, Northern Arizona University. 1999. Awarded for distinction achieved in both teaching and research, and for integrating scholarship with curriculum.
