= Kimberly K. Smith =

American historian

- Born: March 27, 1966 (age 59)
- Education: University of Michigan; University of California, Berkeley
- Occupation: Educator
- Awards: Merle Curti Award (2001)

Kimberly K. Smith (born March 27, 1966) is an American historian, and political science professor.

== Life ==
She graduated from University of Michigan with a Ph.D., and from Boalt School of Law at the University of California, Berkeley. She teaches at Carleton College.

She has published articles in the Journal of Political Philosophy, Wisconsin Journal of Environmental Law, Women's Studies, California Law Review, Rhetoric and Public Affairs, and Environmental Ethics.

== Awards ==
- 2001 Merle Curti Award by the Organization of American Historians, for The Dominion of Voice: Riot, Reason and Romance in Antebellum Politics

== Selected works ==
- The Dominion of Voice: Riot, Reason and Romance in Antebellum Politics. University Press of Kansas. 1999. ISBN 978-0-7006-0957-4.
- Wendell Berry and the Agrarian Tradition: A Common Grace. University Press of Kansas. 2003. ISBN 978-0-7006-1230-7.
- African American Environmental Thought: Foundations. University Press of Kansas. March 2007. ISBN 978-0-7006-1516-2.
- Governing Animals: Animal Welfare and the Liberal State. Oxford University Press. 2012. ISBN 9780199895755.
