= Marcel Wissenburg =

Dutch political theorist (born 1962)

Marcellinus Lambertus Johan "Marcel" Wissenburg (born 1962) is a Dutch political theorist, born in Arnhem. He is Professor of Political Theory at Radboud University Nijmegen, Netherlands.

== Career ==
Wissenburg studied political science and philosophy at the Radboud University Nijmegen (RU), where he then read for a PhD, graduating in 1994. He was a junior researcher at RU in the Faculty of Management Sciences from 1990 to 1994, then a postdoctoral research fellow (funded by the Netherlands Foundation for Scientific Research) at the same institution from 1995 to 1998. He became a Lecturer of Political Theory and the Philosophy of the Policy Sciences in 1997, and held this title until 2005. During this time, he taught in the University of Leiden's Department of Political Science and, from 1999-2000, at the University of Groningen. Between 1999 and 2001, he was affiliated with the Nijmegen Centre for Business, Environment and Government.

He was the Socrates Professor of Humanist Philosophy at the Wageningen University and Research Centre from 2004 to 2009. From 2006 to 2009, he was temporarily appointed as Professor of Political Theory in the political science department at RU, but this position became permanent in 2009. That same year, he was appointed Visiting Professor at the Research Institute for Law, Politics & Justice, Keele University, and, since 2011, he has been the chair of the RU Department of Public Affairs & Political Science.

== Bibliography ==
=== Monographs ===
- 1998: Green Liberalism: The Free and the Green Society. London: University College London Press.
- 1999: Imperfection and Impartiality: A Liberal Theory of Social Justice. London: University College London Press.
- 2008: Political Pluralism and the State: Beyond Sovereignty. Routledge Innovators in Political Theory. London: Routledge.

=== Edited collections ===
- 1995: Civic Politics and Civil Society. Nijmegen, Netherlands: University of Nijmegen Press.
- 1999: European Discourses on Environmental Policy. Aldershot, United Kingdom: Ashgate. (with Gökhan Orhan and Ute Collier)
- 2001: Sustaining Liberal Democracy: Ecological Challenges and Opportunities. London and New York: Palgrave. (with John Barry)
- 2004: Liberal Democracy and Environmentalism: The End of Environmentalism? ECPR European Political Science Series. London: Routledge. (with Yoram Levy)
- 2014: Political Animals and Animal Politics. Palgrave Macmillan Animal Ethics Series. Basingstoke, United Kingdom: Palgrave Macmillan. (with David Schlosberg)
