= Michael Peters (education academic) =

New Zealand academic

- Born: Michael Adrian Peters; 1948 (age 77–78)
- Education: Auckland University
- Spouse: Tina Besley
- Awards: Honorary Doctorate (Aalborg University, Denmark), Honorary Doctor of Letters (State University of New York, American Educational Studies Association Critics Book Award 2010, 2009, 2004, Lifetime Achievement Award, Society for Research into Higher Education, Fellow of the Royal Society of New Zealand
- Scientific career
- Thesis: The problem of rationality : an historicist approach for philosophy of education (1984)
- Doctoral students: Nesta Devine, Makere Stewart-Harawira

Michael Adrian Peters (born 1948) is a New Zealand education academic. He is a former Distinguished Professor in the Faculty of Education at Beijing Normal University (previously Professor at Waikato University) and Emeritus Professor at the University of Illinois at Urbana–Champaign.

== Education ==
Peters received BA(Hons) in Geography from the Victoria University of Wellington in 1970; MA in Philosophy from the University of Auckland in 1980; and PhD in Philosophy of Education from the University of Auckland in 1984. The title of his doctoral thesis was The problem of rationality: an historicist approach for philosophy of education.

== Career ==
Peters became a fellow of the Royal Society Te Apārangi in 2009. Notable doctoral students of Peters include Nesta Devine and Makere Stewart-Harawira.

== Biography ==
Peters is married to his collaborator Tina Besley.

== Bibliography ==
Peters is the author, co-author, editor, and co-editor of approximately seventy books and monographs, including:

- Michael Peters (Editor), Tina Besley (Editor), Huajun Zhang (Editor). Moral education and the ethics of self-cultivation : Chinese and Western perspectives. Singapore, 2021.
- Peters, M.A. & Jandrić, P. (2018). The Digital University: A Dialogue and Manifesto. New York.
- Peters, M.A. & Stickney, J. (Eds.). (2018). Wittgenstein's Education: 'A Picture Held us Captive'. Singapore.
- Peters, M.A. & Ronald Barnett (Eds.). (2018). The idea of the university : a reader. New York.
- Peters, M.A. & Stickney, J. (Eds.). (2017). A Companion to Wittgenstein on Education. Singapore.
- Deimann, M. & Peters, M.A. (Eds.) (2016). The Philosophy of Open Learning. New York.
- Peters, M.A. & Besley, T. (Eds.) (2015). Paulo Freire: The Global Legacy. New York.
- Reid, A., Hart, P., & Peters, M.A. (Eds.) (2013). Companion to Research in Education. Dordrecht.
- Peters, M.A. (Ed.). Educational Philosophy and Politics: The Selected Works of Michael A. Peters. London.
- Peters, M.A. and Bulut, E. (Eds.) (2011). Cognitive Capitalism, Education and the Question of Digital Labor. New York.
- Peters, M.A. (2011). Neoliberalism and After? Education, Social Policy and the Crisis of Capitalism. New York.
- Peters, M.A. & Britez, R. (Eds.) (2008). Open Education and Education for Openness. Rotterdam & Taipei.
- Besley, T. & Peters, M.A. (2008). Subjectivity and Truth: Foucault, Education and the Culture of the Self. New York.
- Peters, M.A. & Besley, T. (Eds.) (2008). Why Foucault? New Directions in Educational Research. New York.
- Peters, M.A. & Besley, T. (2006). Building Knowledge Cultures: Education and Development in the Age of Knowledge Capitalism. Lanham, Boulder, NY, Oxford.
- Peters, M.A. & Burbules, N. (2004). Poststructuralism and Educational Research. Lanham, Boulder, NY, Oxford.
- Peters, M.A. (Ed.) (2002). Heidegger, Education and Modernity. Lanham, Boulder, NY, Oxford.
- Peters, M.A. (Ed.) (1999). After the Disciplines? The Emergence of Cultural Studies. Westport, CT. & London.
- Peters, M.A. (1996). Poststructuralism, Politics and Education. Westport, CT. & London.
- Giroux, H., Lankshear, C., McLaren, P. & Peters, M.A. (Eds.) (1996). Counternarratives: Cultural Studies and Critical Pedagogies in Postmodern Spaces. London.
