= North Carolina Center for the Advancement of Teaching =

Created in 1985, the North Carolina Center for the Advancement of Teaching (NCCAT) provides professional development for educators. NCCAT's main campus is located in Cullowhee, North Carolina, with a second campus on Ocracoke Island.

== History ==
The 1983 North Carolina Teacher of the Year, Jean Powell of Clinton, North Carolina was an invited guest speaker to the North Carolina Commission on Education for Economic Growth. Powell told the commission that North Carolina should create a place where teachers could go to become enthusiastic about learning again and could pass this enthusiasm on to their students. "To attract and retain the best teachers, we must find a way to enhance their self-worth, pride of accomplishment, and enthusiasm," she said.

The commission liked Powell's idea. The Chancellor of Western Carolina University, H.F. Robinson, was appointed to head a planning committee. In 1985 the NC General Assembly established NCCAT as part of the University of North Carolina system. The Center was modeled after the Aspen Institute. Operations began in 1986 on the campus of Western Carolina University and in 1990 a new facility was constructed for the NCCAT in Cullowhee. A board of trustees representing all of the state's educational districts governs the center. NCCAT's campus on Ocracoke Island, North Carolina, is a former U.S. Coast Guard station. The Ocracoke campus will make NCCAT programs more accessible to teachers who live and work in the eastern part of the state.

== NCCAT's Mission ==
NCCAT's mission "is to provide a dynamic environment, in an atmosphere of respect and dignity, where North Carolina teachers engage in scholarly activities structured to stimulate intellectual curiosity, create thinking, inquiry, and discussion; examine and challenge ideas; have time for reflection, inspiration, and professional networking; and develop renewed enthusiasm for teaching. NCCAT's programs and seminars are designed to provide North Carolina teachers activities structured to develop renewed enthusiasm for teaching. The focus of NCCAT is year-round series of residential programs that incorporate the N. C. Standard Course of Study, which is the prescribed curriculum for public schools in North Carolina. Digital and in school programs are also available.

- Many NCCAT seminars are available at little or no cost to the teacher or school system; applications for seminars are available online at www.nccat.org.
- Seminars are designed to strengthen teachers’ classroom expertise.
- Seminar topics include literacy, digital tools, math and science.
- Seminars designed for pre-school through twelfth-grade educators, including teachers, administrators, school counselors, social workers, and library media specialists.
- Support seminars for beginning teachers.
- NCCAT funds lodging, meals, and programming materials
