= Te Whare Wānanga o Awanuiārangi =

Tertiary institute in Whakatāne, New Zealand

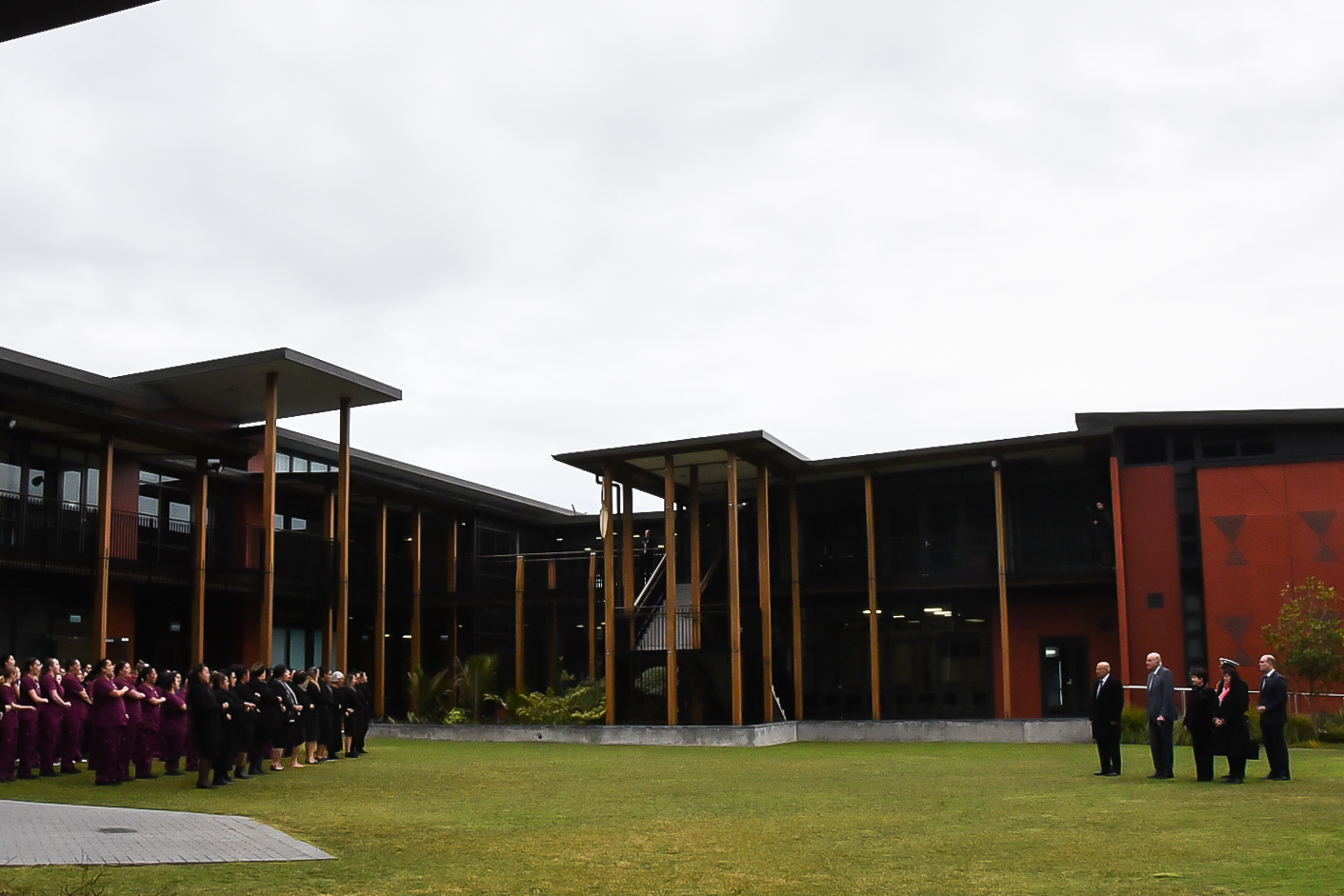
- Welcome for the governor-general, Dame Patsy Reddy at Te Whare Wānanga o Awanuiārangi on 24 July 2019
- Type: Wānanga
- Established: 10 February 1992
- Location: Whakatāne, New Zealand; 37°57′32.04″S 176°59′25.47″E
- Language: Māori
- Website: www.wananga.ac.nz

Te Whare Wānanga o Awanuiārangi is a wānanga (indigenous tertiary education provider) based in Whakatāne, New Zealand, established in 1991 by Ngāti Awa. Today it also has a campus in both Auckland and Whangārei.

== History ==
Te Whare Wānanga o Awanuiārangi was officially opened on 10 February 1992. Formal recognition of the institution under the Education Act 1989 as a Wānanga came in 1997. Professor Sir Hirini Mead (Ngāti Awa, Ngāti Tūwharetoa, Tuhourangi) was appointed chairperson of the Wānanga Establishment Committee in 1992, along with Joe Mason (Ngāti Awa), then General Manager of the tribal authority Te Rūnanga o Ngāti Awa, and Peter McLay, a retired local principal. Wira Gardiner (Ngāti Awa, Te Whānau ā Apanui, Te Whakatōhea, Ngāti Pikiao) and Layne Harvey (Ngāti Awa, Rongowhakaata, Te Aitanga a Māhaki, Ngāti Kahungunu ki Te Wairoa, Te Whānau a Apanui) were appointed to the Committee in 1994. Since 1997, Awanuiārangi has been governed by a council. The current members are Justice Layne Harvey (Chairperson), Professor Linda Smith and Rauru Kirikiri, (Joint Deputy Chairpersons), Materoa Dodd, Tania Rangiheuea, Deputy Chief Judge Craig Coxhead, Regan Studer, Tuihana Pook, Charlie Tawhiao, Natalie Coates and Aubrey Tokawhakaea Temara.

The first Chief Executive Officer of Awanuiārangi was Himiona Nuku. He was followed by Te Ururoa Flavell, Professor Gary Hook, Sir Wira Gardiner and Professor Kuni Jenkins as Acting CEOs and then Professor Graham Smith from 2007 to 2015. After Professor Smith's retirement from the role, Professor Wiremu Doherty was appointed Acting CEO for 12 months and then to the permanent position in 2016. Professor Doherty is the incumbent.

The Whakatāne campus was later redeveloped, and the new campus was officially opened in December 2012 by Tumu Te Heuheu Tūkino VIII. At the ceremony, a posthumous Honorary Doctorate was awarded to Te Onehou Eliza Phillis, an Honorary doctorate to Sir Harawira Gardiner, and Amohaere Tangitū was awarded a Distinguished Fellowship. Since then, honorary doctorate recipients have included Sir Pou Temara (Ngāi Tūhoe), Te Ariki Mei (Ngāti Kahungnu), Mereana Selby (Ngāti Raukawa), Layne Harvey, Kihi Ngatai (Ngāi Te Rangi), Hauata Palmer (Ngāi Te Rangi), Dame Georgina Kingi (Ngāti Awa), Sir Joseph Williams (Ngāti Pūkenga, Tapuika), Joseph Mason, Te Kei Merito (Ngāti Awa), Teriaki Amoamo (Te Whakatōhea), Dame Tariana Turia (Ngāti Apa, Ngā Wairiki, Whanganui, Ngāti Tūwharetoa), and Stanley Pardoe (Rongowhakaata, Te Aitanga a Māhaki, Ngāti Kahungunu). Materoa Dodd and former council member Adrienne von Tunzelmann were awarded Distinguished Fellowships.

== Notable faculty ==
- Sidney Moko Mead
- Taiarahia Black
- Esther Tumama Cowley-Malcolm
- Wiremu Doherty
- Hinemoa Elder
- Annemarie Gillies
- Te Kani Kingi
- Graham Smith
- Linda Tuhiwai Smith
- Caroline Phillips, archaeologist
- Pou Temara
- Virginia Warriner, professor of business

== Notable alumni ==
- Kura Paul-Burke, professor of marine science at University of Waikato.
- Chief Judge Caren Fox, Head of Bench of the Māori Land Court and Chairperson of the Waitangi Tribunal became the first sitting judge to gain a PhD from Awanuiārangi in 2023.

== See also ==
- Te Wānanga o Raukawa
- Te Wānanga o Aotearoa
