= Tina Besley =

New Zealand education academic

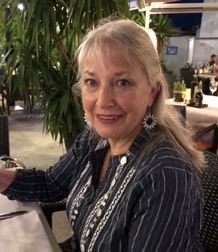
- Born: Athlone Christine Besley; 1950
- Other name: Tina Besley
- Citizenship: New Zealand
- Education: University of Auckland
- Spouse: Michael Adrian Peters
- Scientific career
- Fields: Philosophy of education
- Workplaces: California State University San Bernardino, University of Waikato, University of Illinois at Urbana-Champaign and University of Glasgow
- Thesis: Self, identity, adolescence and the professionalisation of school counselling in New Zealand: a Foucauldian-inspired approach (2000)
- Doctoral advisor: James Marshall and Hans Everts

Athlone Christine Besley (born in New Zealand in 1950) is an education academic.

== Education ==
With degrees from University of Canterbury, Christchurch Teachers' College, and Massey University, Besley has a PhD in Education in 2001 from University of Auckland titled Self, identity, adolescence and the professionalisation of school counselling in New Zealand: a Foucauldian-inspired approach.

== Career ==
Having been a NZ secondary school teacher for 16 years, she began her academic career as research fellow at University of Glasgow, Scotland in late 2000, then she moved to University of Illinois at Urbana-Champaign. She has been a Full Professor since appointment in 2006 at California State University San Bernardino. In 2008 she returned to University of Illinois at Urbana-Champaign as research professor before her appointment at the University of Waikato in August 2011.

She works closely and writes often with Prof. Michael A. Peters, her husband since 1996.

Besley was Professor, Founding Director of the Centre for Global Studies in Education from 2012 to 2017, Associate Dean International (Faculty of Education) at University of Waikato. Besley has been President of Philosophy of Education Society of Australasia (PESA). As a longstanding member who organised the 2014 Annual PESA conference in Hamilton, She was awarded Fellow of PESA, FPESA. She is founding President of The Association for Visual Pedagogies Inc (AVP) founded in 2015.

In September 2018 she took up a position as Distinguished Professor at Beijing Normal University, China.

== Publications ==
- Besley, Tina. Counseling Youth: Foucault, Power, and the Ethics of Subjectivity. ABC-CLIO, 2002.
- Peters, Michael A., and Tina Besley. Building knowledge cultures: Education and development in the age of knowledge capitalism. Vol. 2. Rowman & Littlefield Publishers, 2006.
- Besley, Tina, and Peters, Michael A.. Subjectivity & truth: Foucault, education, and the culture of self. New York: Peter Lang, 2007.
- Besley, Tina. Foucault, truth telling and technologies of the self in schools. The Journal of Educational Enquiry, vol. 6, no. 1, 2009.
- Peters, Michael A., and Tina Besley. The creative university. Rotterdam: Sense Publishers, 2013.
- Besley, Tina, and Peters, Michael A. Teaching, responsibility, and the corruption of youth. Leiden, The Netherlands; Boston: Brill Sense, 2019.
