= Environmental politics =

Study of politics about the environment

Environmental politics designates both the politics about the environment and an academic field of study focused on three core components:

- The study of political theories and ideas related to the environment;
- The examination of the environmental stances of both mainstream political parties and environmental social movements; and
- The analysis of public policymaking and implementation affecting the environment, at multiple geo-political levels.

Neil Carter, in his foundational text Politics of the Environment (2009), suggests that environmental politics is distinct in at least two ways: first, "it has a primary concern with the relationship between human society and the natural world" (page 3); and second, "unlike most other single issues, it comes replete with its own ideology and political movement" (page 5, drawing on Michael Jacobs, ed., Greening the Millenium?, 1997).

Further, he distinguishes between modern and earlier forms of environmental politics, in particular conservationism and preservationism. Contemporary environmental politics "was driven by the idea of a global ecological crisis that threatened the very existence of humanity." And "modern environmentalism was a political and activist mass movement which demanded a radical transformation in the values and structures of society."

== Journals ==
Scholarly journals representing this field of study include:

- Environmental Politics
- Global Environmental Politics
