= Brendan Hokowhitu =

New Zealand academic

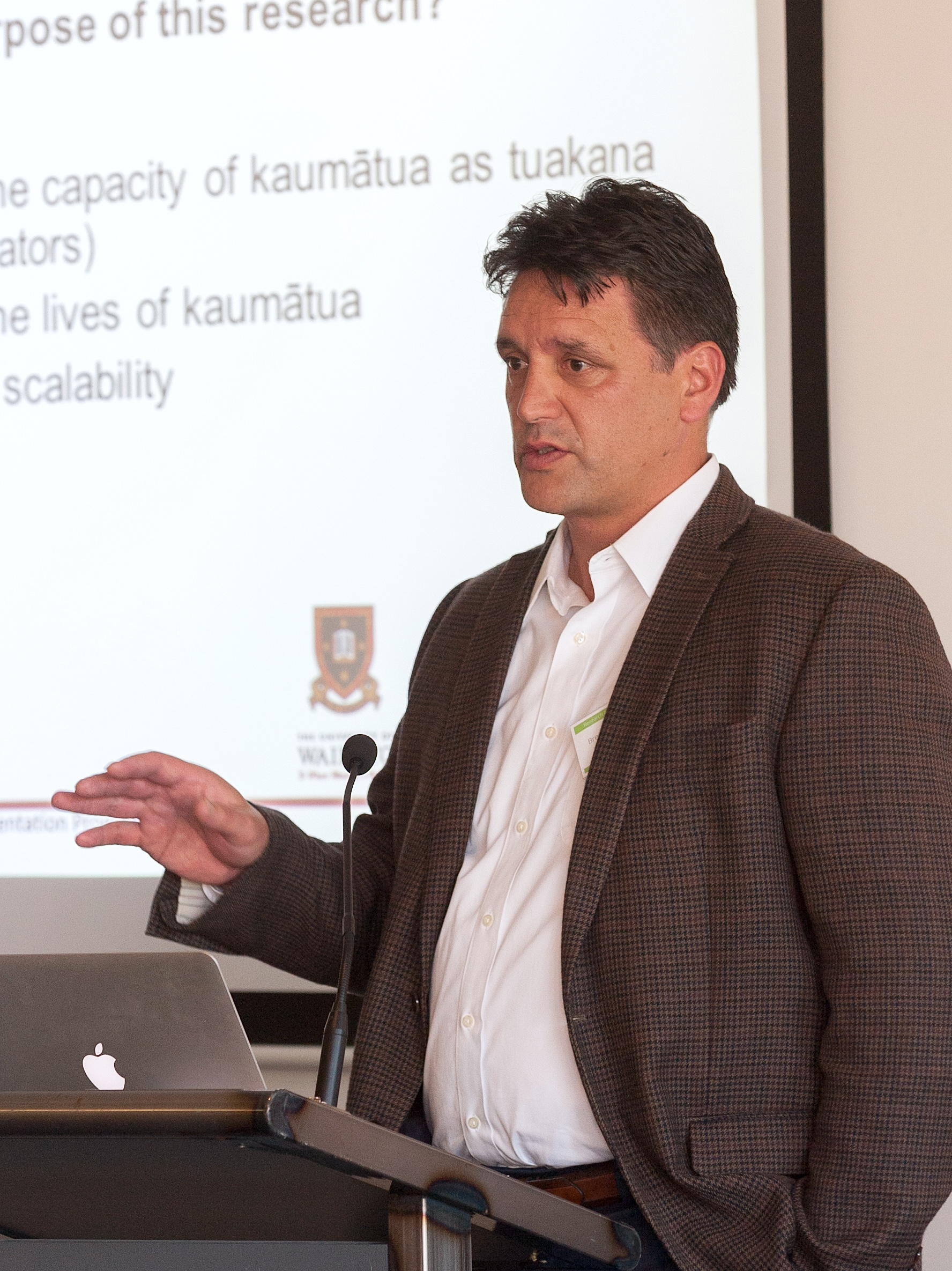
- Hokowhitu in 2017
- Born: Brendan J. Hokowhitu; Ōpōtiki, New Zealand
- Education: University of Otago
- Scientific career
- Fields: Indigenous studies
- Workplaces: University of Otago, University of Alberta in Edmonton, University of Waikato
- Thesis: Te mana Māori : Te tātari i ngā kōrero parau (2001)

Brendan J. Hokowhitu is a New Zealand academic who is of Māori, Ngāti Pūkenga descent and as of 2019 is a full professor at the University of Waikato.

== Academic career ==
After a 2001 PhD titled 'Te mana Māori : Te tātari i ngā kōrero parau' at the University of Otago, Hokowhitu moved to the University of Alberta in Edmonton and then to the University of Waikato, rising to full professor.

In 2019, Hokowhitu was elected a Fellow of the Royal Society of New Zealand.

== Selected works ==
- Hokowhitu, Brendan. "Tackling Maori masculinity: A colonial genealogy of savagery and sport." The Contemporary Pacific 16, no. 2 (2004): 259–284.
- Jackson, Steven J., and Brendan Hokowhitu. "Sport, tribes, and technology: The New Zealand All Blacks haka and the politics of identity." Journal of Sport and Social Issues 26, no. 2 (2002): 125–139.
- Hokowhitu, Brendan. "'Physical beings': Stereotypes, sport and the'physical education'of New Zealand Māori." Culture, Sport, Society 6, no. 2-3 (2003): 192–218.
