= American Educational Studies Association =

International learned society dedicated to research on education

- Abbreviation: AESA
- Formation: 1968
- Type: Learned society
- Purpose: Research
- Headquarters: 113 N. Democratic St., Tecumseh, Michigan 49286
- President: Hilton Kelly
- Secretary: Pamela Konkol
- President-Elect: Roland Sintos Coloma
- Website: educationalstudies.org

The American Educational Studies Association (AESA) is an international learned society dedicated to research on education. It was established in 1968 and is based in Tecumseh, Michigan. Most of its members are university professors whose work pertains to education in one of multiple liberal arts disciplines. It is a member of the Council of Social Foundations in Education. It publishes a newsletter and the peer-reviewed journal Educational Studies.

== Educational Studies: The Journal of the AESA ==
In the inaugural issue of the new journal in 1970, editors Lantz, Laska, Rich, & Hackett addressed the proliferation of educational and research materials:

"We live in an ‘explosive’ age. Not only must we try to come to terms with the awesome power of the atom, but we have recently been made aware of the perhaps equally threatening ‘population explosion.’ We also must contend with another explosive situation –a rapidly increasing proliferation of books and journals that has begun to exceed the capacities of our library storage facilities as well as the reading capabilities of the students and scholars these publications are intended to serve."

The editors did not want to add to the explosion of new information, so they created their journal to review, promote, and, potentially, eliminate publications that AESA members may be interested in. Through monthly review essays and feature articles, plus extensive book review “articles,” new information and ideas were brought to the attention of teachers across disciplines. The journal arranged multidisciplinary subject material within the realms of Educational Research and Reference, Philosophy of Education, Educational Psychology, Comparative and International Education, Teaching Process and the Curriculum, Educational System as a Formal Organization, Educational Policy Issues, Social Foundations of Education, and History of Education.
