= Helen May =

New Zealand education academic (born 1947)

Helen May ONZM
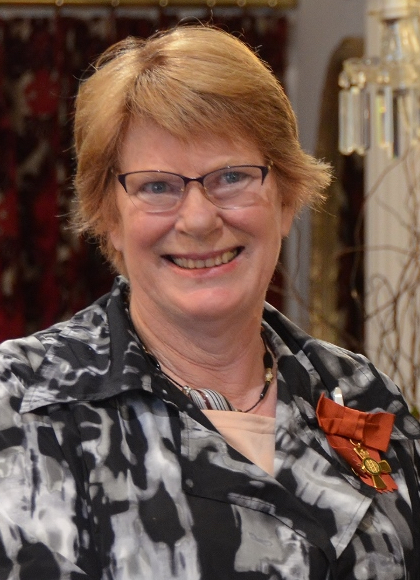
- Helen May in 2016
- Born: Helen May Bradwell; 25 February 1947; Christchurch
- Spouse(s): Graham Cook (1968-86); Crispin Gardiner (m. 1986)

Academic background
- Education: Victoria University of Wellington
- Thesis: Postwar Women 1945-1960 and Their Daughters 1970-1985: an Analysis of Continuity, Contradiction, and Change in Two Generations of Pakeha Women as Mothers, Wives, and Workers (1988)
- Doctoral advisor: James Urry, Ann Chowning
- Influences: Jack Shallcrass, Jan Pouwer, Sonja Davies, Cathy Wylie, Geraldine McDonald

Academic work
- Institutions: Victoria University of Wellington; Hamilton Teachers' College; University of Waikato; University of Otago
- Doctoral students: Marie Bell (educationalist); Linda Mitchell
- Website: www.otago.ac.nz/education/staff/helenmay.html www.nzcer.org.nz/helen-may www.otago.ac.nz/press/helenmay.html

Helen May ONZM (born Helen May Bradwell on 25 February 1947; from 1968 to 1983 known as Helen Cook or sometimes Helen May Cook) is a New Zealand education pioneer. She has been an eloquent activist and academic in education, with a strong feminist focus on early childhood education. Her advocacy has been characterised by its focus on the rights and needs of children and teachers, expressed by an active and collaborative engagement with educational institutions, trade unions, the Ministry of Education and other government agencies.

During her career she has taken on the roles of a schoolteacher of children aged 5–7, childcare worker, teachers' college and university lecturer, and professor and dean of education.

She is the author of numerous books, mainly on historical and political aspects of early years teaching. Since 2017 she has been an Emeritus Professor of Education at the University of Otago and adjunct professor at Victoria University of Wellington.

== Early life and education ==
Helen Bradwell was born in Christchurch New Zealand in 1947. Her father Cyril Bradwell was a returned serviceman, previously an accountant, who, after his wartime experiences, trained as a teacher, and did a master's degree in history. Her mother Nola Bradwell (born Carrington) was a professional tailor. Both parents were of working-class background, and were committed members of the Salvation Army.

The family moved to Kenya in 1951 when Mr Bradwell took up a position as a schoolteacher in an African boys' secondary school in Kisii. Helen noted

This [was] a few extraordinary years that shaped my perceptions of people, places, cultures, and geography forever… I had long been cognisant that my childhood experiences and perceptions had been shaped by colonial politics that had taken my father to Kenya. We were living in Kenya during the worst of the European-termed ‘Mau Mau Emergency’ or ‘Troubles’; although there were uprisings, slaughter, repressions, and incarcerations, they were mainly distant from the Kisii district and its Gusii people. My childhood understandings of these times were limited and selective.

Her schooling in Kenya was initially provided by the New Zealand correspondence school, with her mother organising lessons and materials sent from New Zealand; however, it was impractical to send work back to New Zealand to be marked. From the age of almost 7 she attended Kericho School, a Kenyan boarding school, which provided a progressive education.

In 1955 the family returned to New Zealand, initially to Oamaru and then in 1958 to Christchurch. While her parents easily returned to their former lifestyle, centred on teaching and the Salvation Army, Helen found it "very strange ... and somewhat constraining after my experiences in Africa". The schooling she found to be regimented and narrow minded, compared to that of her school in Kenya.

From 1960 to 1963 she attended Riccarton High School, opened in 1958 to accommodate the post-war baby boomers reaching their teens. There were a few exceptions to the tedium of most classes, including being taught history by her father, the deputy principal of the school, taken to Shakespeare plays, the NZ Symphony orchestra and an introduction to modern art by art teacher and Christchurch artist Ted Bracey.

== Academic career 1964–1982 ==
=== Primary school teaching career ===
Helen trained as a primary school teacher at Christchurch Teachers' College in 1964 - 1965. She recalled:

Having survived secondary school, all of my sixth form girlfriends and I went to Teachers' College. We went for interviews in our school uniforms, and we all got accepted. Years later I found out that the [1962] Currie Report actually recommended that 50% of sixth form girls go into teaching. They more than met their goal at our school - an indication of the lack of good long-term careers advice about what was possible for a young woman in the 1960s.

She receiving her Trained Teacher's Certificate in 1966, and from then to 1974 taught classes mainly of 5 to 6-year-old children, in Auckland and Wellington, as well as spending 1971 - 1972 teaching in British infant schools, where she found:

Unlike New Zealand schools, where there were so few opportunities and role models for women, there was a complete career structure, and you could become a headmistress.

=== Student, mother and childcare worker ===
Helen's first child was born in 1974, 18 months after her return to New Zealand, and although she wanted to continue her teaching career, the reality was that in Wellington there was no childcare for babies. This ended her career as a primary school teacher. She said:

I still feel angry about trying to talk with the headmaster of my school. I was on maternity leave. He urged me to resign and, silly me, I did - with tears I might add.

Helen then concentrated on finishing her B.A. in anthropology at Victoria University of Wellington, where there was a Creche. She studied with Jan Pouwer, the foundation Professor of Anthropology at Victoria University who introduced his students to the structuralist analysis and dialectical thought of scholars such as Claude Levi Strauss and Michel Foucault. In 1976 she became a part time childcare worker in the Creche, and then in 1978 became the full time Co-ordinating Supervisor of Victoria University Creche. In 1976 she completed her B.A., and in 1977 gave birth to her second child. During this period Helen also completed in 1979 a Diploma of Educational Studies, in 1982 a Bachelor of Educational Studies, and in 1983 an M.A. in education. The M.A. thesis, entitled The politics of childcare: an analysis of growth and constraint analysed the political situation of childcare as it was developing in real time. "My own life and the national scene merged. All my years of reading came together and made sense and made me more angry."

=== Activism in childcare ===
In 1979 Victoria University financially supported Helen to attend both the First Early Childhood Convention in Christchurch (a feature of the International Year of the Child), and the annual conference of the NZ Association of Child Care Centres. This began Helen's active involvement in politics of Early Childhood Education.

==== The NZ Association of Child Care Centres ====
The NZACCC, set up in 1963 by a group led by Sonja Davies, had as its overall aim "to improve the quality of care and education for preschool children, by supporting centres and providing staff training." In practice it liaised with Government agencies on aspects of legislation and funding for Child Care Centres, and provided an in-service training programme for childcare workers. From 1980 to 1990 Helen was on the Association's executive, and in due course became vice president. During this period she also became and the Convenor of Training, overseeing a considerable expansion in breadth, in depth and in Government funding for the programme.

==== The Early Childhood Workers Union ====
At the 1979 annual conference of the NZACCC, Helen met Sonja Davies who announced she was setting up a trade union for childcare workers, and called a meeting of all workers. Helen attended and became the first president of Early Childhood Workers' Union (ECWU), from when it was registered on 23 March 1982, until 1984. The ECWU met strong opposition from the Auckland Employers Associations in their first negotiation (where Helen led the ECWU negotiation team):

... the Employers' Association upset conciliation proceedings in Hamilton by forcing the issue to go to the Arbitration Court.The ECWU and the Hamilton Daycare Centres Trust ... were willing parties to a conciliation council. The Employers' Association is concerned that an award settled, say in Hamilton would act as leverage for the settlement of a national or other awards.

Although in the Arbitration Court the Union and the Trust won the right to negotiate, the 1982 wage and price freeze (see Robert Muldoon Economic recession and wage and price freeze) was imposed on the day after the hearing, making any industrial negotiation illegal. It was July 1984 before the union's first industrial award was negotiated, this only after a successful campaign to get an amendment to the wage-price freeze regulations specifically to allow the Union and Employers to negotiate.

== Life in Hamilton, 1983–1995 ==
At the end of 1983 Helen left her marriage and Wellington and moved to Hamilton, where her new partner, and later husband, Crispin Gardiner was located. Her third child was born there in 1986. She continued her engagement in childcare politics, commenced, and in 1988 completed a Victoria University Ph.D. with a thesis entitled Postwar Women 1945-1960 and Their Daughters 1970-1985: an Analysis of Continuity, Contradiction, and Change in Two Generations of Pakeha Women as Mothers, Wives, and Workers. During this period she also wrote her first two books.

The dramatic change in the political landscape, following the 1984 election of the Lange Government led directly to the 1986 transfer of Government responsibility for Childcare Centres from the Department of Social Welfare to the Education Department. In turn, this led to major changes in the funding and nature of early childhood education in New Zealand. For the rest of her career, Helen was actively involved in the development of early childhood policy, curriculum development and teacher education.

== Academic career, 1987–2016 ==
=== Hamilton Teachers' College and University of Waikato ===
In 1987 Helen was appointed as a lecturer in early childhood at Hamilton Teachers' College, and later, after an institutional merger at the beginning of 1991, became a senior lecturer and head of the Department of Early Childhood Studies at the University of Waikato.

She summarised her entry into this position:

At that stage [Hamilton Teacher's College was] only doing kindergarten training, and my background was childcare. The college was reluctant to employ me, but I knew the world was about to change, and within a few months of being there the new three-year training was announced by the Lange Government. ... there would be integrated training for childcare and kindergarten services. This was an ideal opportunity to be in at the ground floor and a crucial area for a more political approach.

In 1989, paralleling the Tomorrow's Schools reforms of Education, the Before Five reforms of Early Childhood Education took place, with the principal aim of unifying the disparate forms of Early Childhood education in New Zealand, in terms of funding, regulation and teacher training. Helen chaired the working party on National Guidelines, Regulations and Charters. The recommendations resulting from the Before Five process were broadly speaking implemented by the Lange-Palmer government, with regulations implementing quality standards and substantial funding increases. The funding was to be implemented via a four-year staged plan.

But the hard-fought-for funding scheme was only in place [for] a year before the new national Government halted the staged implementation and cut back the funding where it mattered most — infant funding. It was as though the men in there got a glimpse of what it might mean for the state to take some real responsibility for sharing childrearing and didn't like it. 1991 was a year of great disillusionment for me.

=== Development of Te Whāriki ===
A significant aspect of the new Early Childhood system was the requirement for an educational curriculum for the Early Childhood sector, which by law included pre-school children of all ages, from new-born to six years old. In 1990 the Ministry of Education put out a request for proposals to develop such a curriculum. The responsibilities of the successful contractor were, in summary:

- To produce a final draft of curriculum guidelines for early childhood education by a process involving 10 - 12 practitioners and experts
- To select a reference group with appropriate geographical, gender and cultural balance, whose composition was to be approved by the Ministry of Education.
- To consult with relevant early Childhood Organisations.

Helen and her colleague Margaret Carr (a Waikato lecturer also originally in the Hamilton Teachers' College) with the overwhelming support both Early Childhood organisations and of Early Childhood academics developed a proposal and won the contract, which was signed in December 1990. In order to adequately represent Māori and kōhanga reo, they consulted with the Kohanga Reo Trust, who asked that they work in consultation with Tamati Reedy and Tilly Reedy, as representatives of the Trust.

The fundamental structure of the curriculum was formulated biculturally by Margaret, Helen, Tilly and Tamati, and from there the Māori and English versions - which were parallel documents, not translations of each other - were developed. The name chosen for the curriculum, Te Whāriki, was gifted by Tamati Reedy - translated into English: "a mat for all to stand on"- recognises that the curriculum for each service and centre would be unique in its pattern and woven around the principles, aims and goals. There was broad support across the sector for this approach which celebrated diversity and the valued the professional knowledge of teachers and the contribution of family and community.

Their final draft was submitted to the Ministry of Education at the end of 1992. After some negotiation over modifications with the Ministry Te Whāriki, in the form of the draft curriculum guidelines, was accepted by the Ministry, and made available for consultation with Early Childhood Centres and other bodies in 1993. After a trial and further consultation, the finalised version of Te Whāriki was officially promulgated in 1996.

== Later career ==
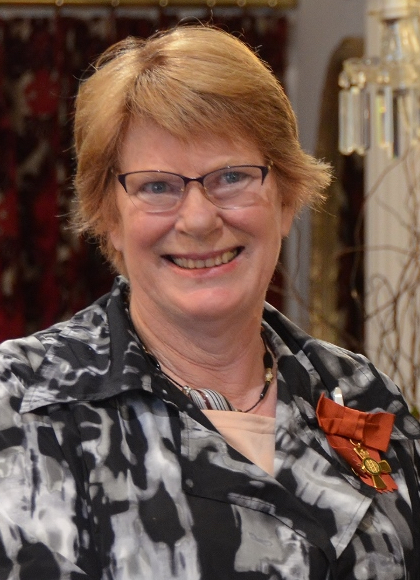
Helen May in 2016, at the time of her appointment as an Officer of the New Zealand Order of Merit

Helen was appointed to the first New Zealand professorial Chair in Early Childhood Education at Victoria University of Wellington in 1995, and in 2005 she was appointed as Professor of Education and Head of Faculty of Education at the University of Otago. From 2007 to 2011 she was the Dean of the University of Otago College of Education. On retirement in 2017 she became an Emeritus professor. She is currently based in Wellington.

In 2019, Helen co-edited For Women and Children: a tribute to Geraldine McDonald with Sue Middleton, a collection of writings in honour of the life and work of researcher Geraldine McDonald.

== Accolades ==
- 1990: Life Member NZ Childcare Association (Te Rito Maioha - Early Childhood Education)
- 2014-2016: President of the International Froebel Society
- 2016 New Year Honours: Officer of the New Zealand Order of Merit, for services to Education

== Selected works ==
=== Books ===
May has written numerous books, mainly on subjects related to education and education policy for early-years teaching.

==== History and politics of early childhood education ====
- Mind That Child: Childcare as a Social and Political Issue in New Zealand; BlackBerry Press, Wellington, 1985
- The Discovery of Early Childhood, the development of services for the care and education of very young children, Auckland University Press and NZCER Press, Auckland and Wellington, 1st ed 1997, 2nd ed 2013
- Politics in the Playground. The world of early childhood in postwar New Zealand; 1st ed. Bridget Williams Books with NZCER, Wellington, 2001; 2nd ed. University of Otago Press, Dunedin, 2009; 3rd ed University of Otago Press, 2019
- Concerning Women Considering Children: Battles of the Childcare Association, 1963-2003; Te Tari Puna Ora o Aotearoa-NZCA, Wellington, 1st ed 2003, 2nd ed (e-book on mebooks.co.nz) 2013
- Ngā āhuatanga hurihuri o te tiaki tamariki. The changing fortunes of childcare 2003-2013; Te Tari Puna Ora o Aoteraoa—New Zealand Childcare Association, Wellington, 2013 (Also published as an e-book on mebooks.co.nz)
- People, places and play in the ‘child gardens’ of Dunedin, Dunedin Kindergartens - Mana Manaaki Puawai O Otepoti 125 years old; Dunedin Kindergartens, 2014
- Growing a kindergarten movement: its peoples, purposes and politics; Wellington, NZCER Press, 2017 (with K. Bethell)
- A Celebration of Women in Early Childhood; Waikato Education Centre, Hamilton, 1990 (Edited, with J Mitchell)
- A Celebration of Early Childhood Volume II; Waikato Education Centre, Hamilton, 1993 (Edited, with J Mitchell)
- Kindergarten Narratives on Froebelian Education: Transnational Investigations; London, Bloomsbury Press, 2016 (Edited with K Nawrotzki, and L Prochner)
- For Women and Children: A Tribute to Geraldine McDonald; Wellington, NZCER Press, 2019 (Edited with S Middleton)
- Ngā kohinga kōrero ate aumangea: Kia mana te ara kōhungahunga ki Aotearoa. Life Stories on the Frontline: Growing a childcare movement in Aotearoa; Wellington, Te Rito Maiaoha Early Childhodhood New Zealand, 2021 (Edited with A Card and J Carroll-Lind)

==== New Zealand schooling and teaching ====
- Teachers Talk Teaching 1915-1995, early childhood, school, teachers college, Dunmore Press, Palmerston North, 1997 (with S. Middleton).
- School Beginnings: a 19th century colonial story; NZCER Press, Wellington, 2005
- I am five and I go to School: the work and play of early education in New Zealand; University of Otago Press, Dunedin, 2011
- Working for Children and Social Change: Tracing the endeavours of three Scottish lady teachers who immigrated to New Zealand in the early 20th century; The Red House, Wellington, 2021 (with K Bethell)

==== History of education ====
- Empire Education and Indigenous Childhood: Missionary infant schools in three British colonies; Ashgate, England Publishing Series on Childhood, 2014 (with B. Kaur and L. Prochner)
- Re-imagining Teaching in Early 20th Century Experimental Schools; Palgrave Macmillan (New York), 2020 (with A A Hai, K Nawrotski, L Prochner and Y Volkanova)

==== Social history ====
- Minding Children: Managing Men: Conflict and Compromise in the Lives of Postwar Pakeha Women; Bridget Williams Books, Wellington, 1992

==== Personal memoirs ====
- Secrets Searches and Surprises: Catherine Jubilee Robertson 1890–1979, Cyril Robertson Bradwell 1916-2008; Wellington, 2018
- Recollections of a Childhood in Kenya; The Red House, Wellington, 2021

=== Journal articles and book chapters ===
- May, H., & Carr, M. (2016). Te Whāriki: A uniquely woven curriculum shaping policy, pedagogy and practice in Aotearoa New Zealand. In T. David, K. Goouch & S. Powell (Eds.), Routledge international handbook of philosophies and theories of early childhood education and care. (pp. 316–326). Abingdon, UK: Routledge.
- May, Helen. "'Minding','Working','Teaching': Childcare in Aotearoa/New Zealand, 1940s—2000s." Contemporary Issues in Early Childhood 8, no. 2 (2007): 133–143.
- Moss, Peter, Gunilla Dahlberg, Susan Grieshaber, Susanna Mantovani, Helen May, Alan Pence, Sylvie Rayna, Beth Blue Swadener, and Michel Vandenbroeck. "The organisation for economic co-operation and development’s international early learning study: Opening for debate and contestation." Contemporary Issues in Early Childhood 17, no. 3 (2016): 343–351.
