= Linda Mitchell (educator) =

New Zealand professor of education

Academic background
- Education: Victoria University of Wellington
- Thesis: A New Debate About Children and Childhood. Could it Make a Difference to Early Childhood Pedagogy and Policy? (2007)
- Doctoral advisor: Helen May; Carmen Dalli

Linda Mary Mitchell is a New Zealand academic, and is a full professor at the University of Waikato, specialising in early childhood education, education policy, and education internationally.

== Academic career ==
Mitchell completed a Bachelor's degree in education at Victoria University of Wellington, followed by a Master of Education Research at the University of Lancaster. She returned to Victoria to complete a PhD titled A New Debate About Children and Childhood. Could it Make a Difference to Early Childhood Pedagogy and Policy?. Mitchell then joined the faculty of the University of Waikato, rising to full professor in 2019. She researches within the Wilf Malcolm Institute of Education, and is Director of the Early Years Research Centre. Mitchell was Leverhulme Visiting Professor at Manchester Metropolitan University in 2022 and 2023, working with Frances Press on democratic education across different contexts.

Mitchell is critical of privatisation and profit-making in the early childhood sector, and some of her books and articles lay out ways in which education can be made more democratic. With Bronwen Cowie, Mitchell leads research on a two-year Teaching and Learning Research Initiative, and Mitchell leads a team that was awarded a Marsden grant in 2017. These grants were both concerned with increasing belonging (mana whenua) for migrant and immigrant families through early childhood experiences, and resulted in the production of materials for use in multicultural ECE settings. Mitchell has also worked on the impact of COVID-19 on the early childhood education sector.

== Selected works ==
=== Books ===
- Peter Moss and Linda Mitchell. Early Childhood in the Anglosphere: Systemic failings and transformative possibilities. UCL Press (2024) ISBN 9781800082533
- Michel Vandenbroeck, Joanne Lehrer, Linda Mitchell. The Decommodification of Early Childhood Education and Care Resisting Neoliberalism. Routledge (2023) ISBN 9781032110301
- Linda Mitchell. Democratic Policies and Practices in Early Childhood Education: An Aotearoa New Zealand Case Study. (2019) Springer Singapore. ISBN 9789811346866
- Wendy Lee, Margaret Carr, Brenda Soutar, Linda Mitchell. Understanding the Te Whariki approach: Early years education in practice Routledge (2013) ISBN 9780415617130

=== Other ===
- Linda Mitchell, Cathy Wylie, Margaret Carr. Outcomes of early childhood education: Literature review. New Zealand Council for Educational Research (2008)
- Linda Mitchell, Pam Cubey. Characteristics of professional development linked to enhanced pedagogy and children's learning in early childhood settings: Best evidence synthesis Ministry of Education (2003)
- Linda Mitchell Assessment practices and aspects of curriculum in early childhood education. Wellington: New Zealand Council for Educational Research (2008)
- Linda Mitchell. Differences between community owned and privately owned early childhood education and care centres: A review of evidence NZCER (2002)
