= Barbara Mitcalfe =

New Zealand botanist and conservationist (1928–2017)

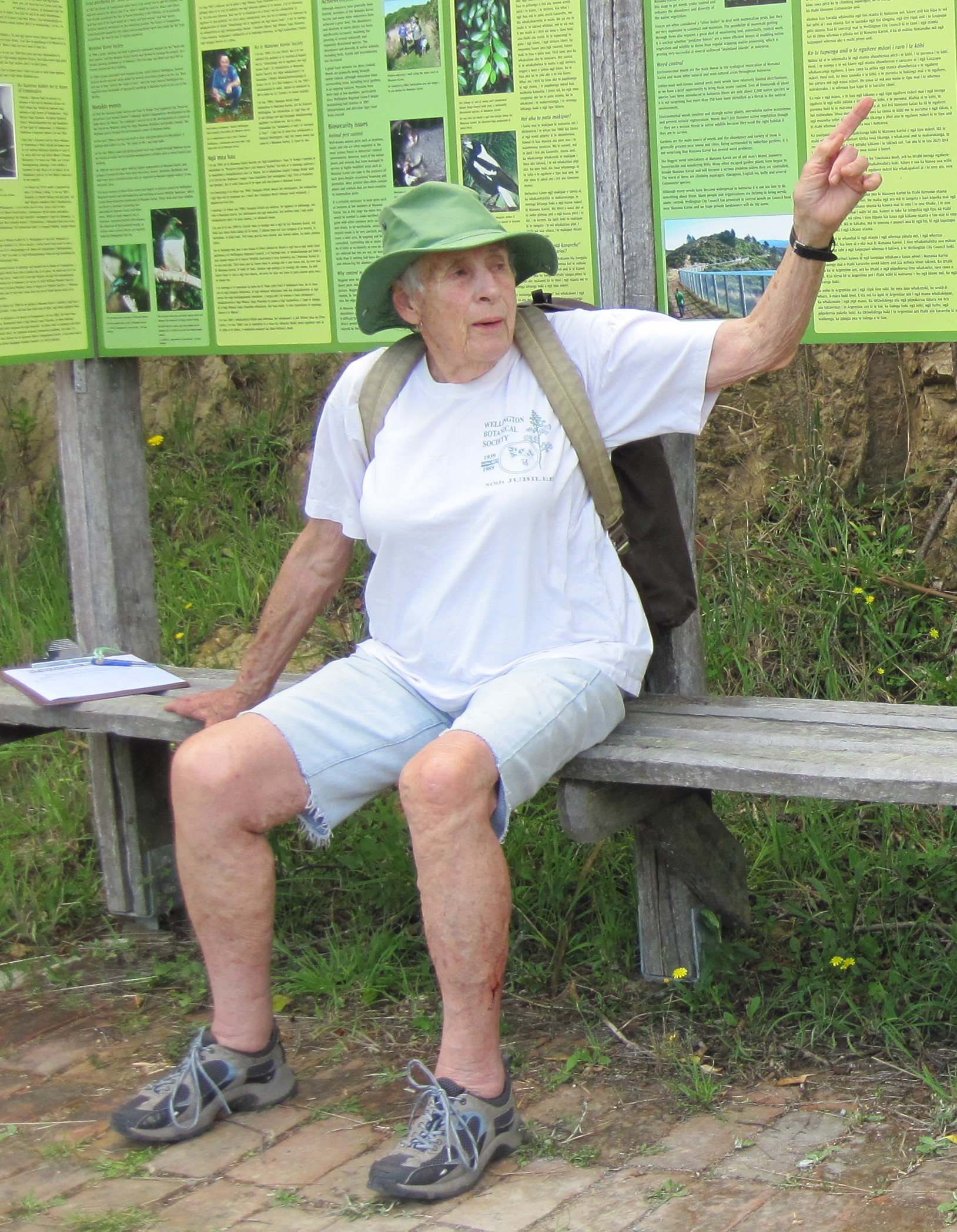
- Born: 25 November 1928; Christchurch
- Died: 7 January 2017 (aged 88); Wellington
- Alma mater: Victoria University of Wellington
- Occupation: Conservationist, botanist, botanical collector, educator
- Spouse(s): Barry Mitcalfe
- Partner(s): John Christopher Horne

Barbara Jean Mitcalfe née Fougère (25 November 1928 – 7 January 2017) was a New Zealand conservationist, botanist and educator. She is best known for being an expert field botanist, for her conservation work in and around the Wellington region, and for helping to establish the first Māori preschool.

== Early life and education ==
Mitcalfe was born in New Brighton, Christchurch in 1928 to Edna and Maurice Fougère. The family moved to Wellington where she attended Mt Cook Primary School and then Wellington East Girls' College. She went on to attend Victoria University of Wellington obtaining a Bachelor of Arts degree in French. She then qualified as a teacher after attending teachers training college. She would return to Victoria University of Wellington in the 1970s to study te reo Māori. During her college and university years Mitcalfe evolved into an enthusiastic tramper. The knowledge and experience she gained during this time would be put to good use later in her life during her botanical tramps.

== Teaching and te reo Māori ==
Mitcalfe initially taught at Te Aute College in the Hawke's Bay but in the late 1950s she moved with her family to Ahipara. It was there from 1959 to 1963 she helped establish Ahipara Pre-School, considered the first Māori pre-school. It was a community initiative in response to a local parent's idea, and was founded and run by volunteer parents and grandparents with the support of the Ahipara School Parent Teacher Association and the Ahipara School Committee.

Later that decade Mitcalfe returned to Wellington. In the 1970s Mitcalfe taught at Wellington Polytechnic and continued at that institution for almost 30 years. During her time at the polytechnic she co-founded the Wellington Polytechnic Environment Group. She was regarded as being ahead of her time, advocating for the use of te reo and for the conservation of New Zealand's endemic flora and fauna. In 2001 Mitcalfe was interviewed for a quality of life for older women oral history project. This recording is held at the Alexander Turnbull Library.

== Botany and conservation work ==
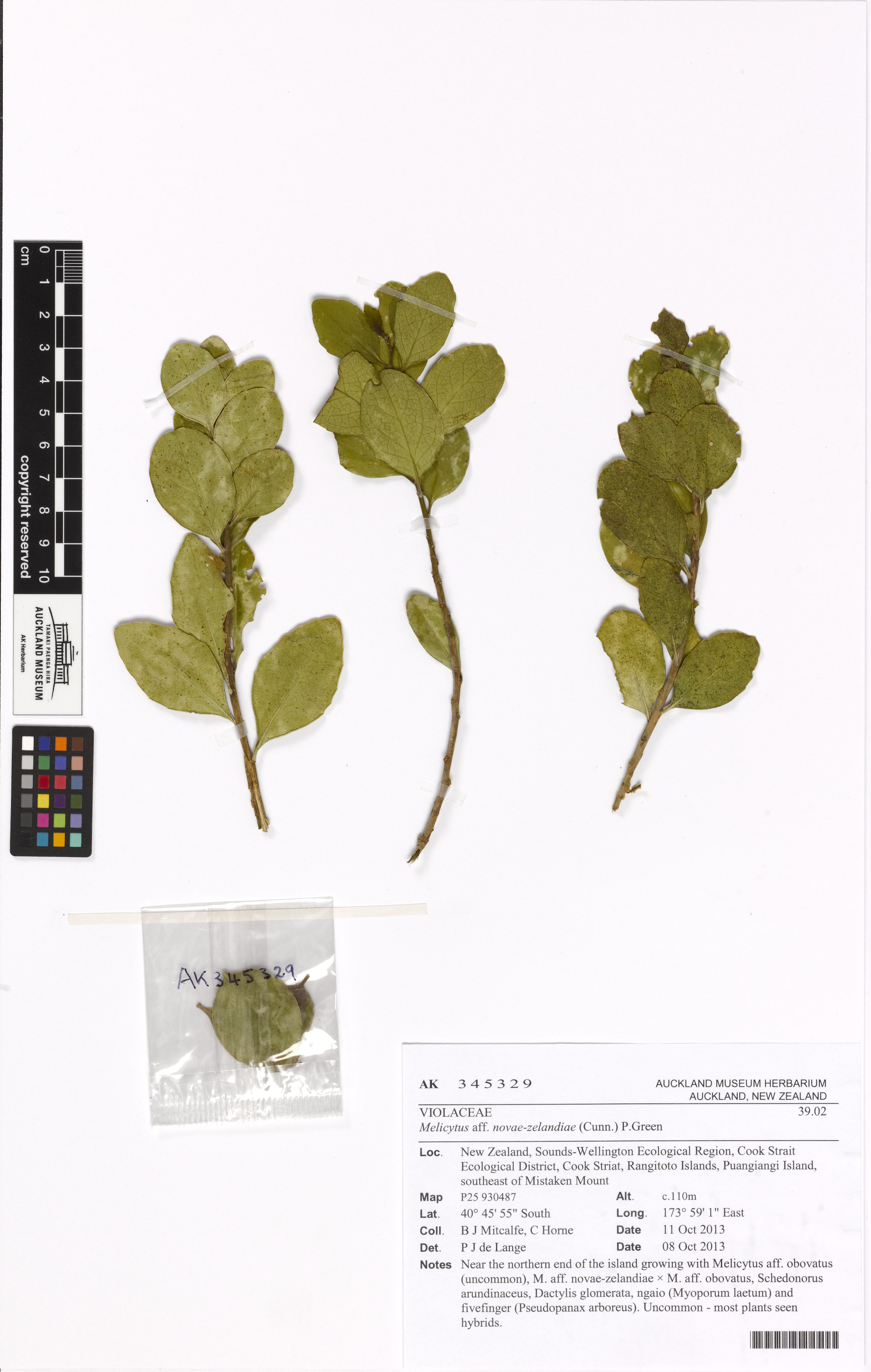
Botanical specimen collected by Mitcalfe.

Mitcalfe was an expert field botanist. She specialising in native plant ecology and led or participated in numerous botanical excursions both in the North and South Islands. She was a member of the Tararua Tramping Club and as well as participating in many club organised excursions she co-authored over 60 articles in the club newsletter. She also conducted lectures and workshops on native plants and on the Environmental Care Code. She was an active member of the Wellington Botanical Society and served as its president from 1989 to 1991 and then vice-president from 1992 to 1994. During both her tramping trips and botanical society excursions, she collected botanical specimens that are now held at New Zealand's national museum Te Papa, the Auckland War Memorial Museum herbarium and the Manaaki Whenua Allan herbarium.

She advocated for and was involved the restoration work to facilitate establishing a corridor of native forest from Wellington's South Coast to the Tararua Range. She was a founding member of the Karori Sanctuary, now known as Zealandia, and volunteered at the sanctuary for over 20 years. She contributed plant descriptions, a glossary of plant names, as well as ecological notes for the botanical trail at Zealandia. In 2001 Mitcalfe received the sanctuary's Outstanding Volunteer Award. In that year her conservation work was also recognised when she was awarded the 2001 Conservation Week Award. Mitcalfe also volunteered at the Wellington Botanic Garden guiding glow-worm walks. She discovered seedlings of Nestegis cunninghamii near the sole remaining adult tree within the Wellington Botanic Garden and arranged for staff to grow these for later planting in the Garden’s native forest areas.

Mitcalfe also volunteered at Otari-Wilton’s Bush leading botanical walks and assisting with their annual native plant sale. She was a founding trustee of the Long Gully Bush Reserve. This reserve is the largest area of private protected land in the city of Wellington and as well as acting as a trustee, Mitcalfe helped compile the first plant list for the reserve as well as coauthored the reserve management plan. Another of her influential projects came about from an invitation in the late 1980's to give advice and assistance to the Manawa Karioi Society's revegetation project on land near the Tapu Te Ranga Marae in Island Bay. As a result of her botanical expertise Mitcalfe was employed by the Department of Conservation, the Greater Wellington Regional Council, the Wellington City Council and the Hutt City Council to conduct surveys, create plant lists and advise on conservation efforts throughout the Wellington region. This also included work to measure the efficacy of possum control as well as monitoring predation of Powelliphanta snails.

Mitcalfe also owned Nga Rengarenga, a 0.06 ha sized piece of land that is protected by a QEII Open Space Covenant, and which has regenerating native forest upon it.

== Conservation activism ==
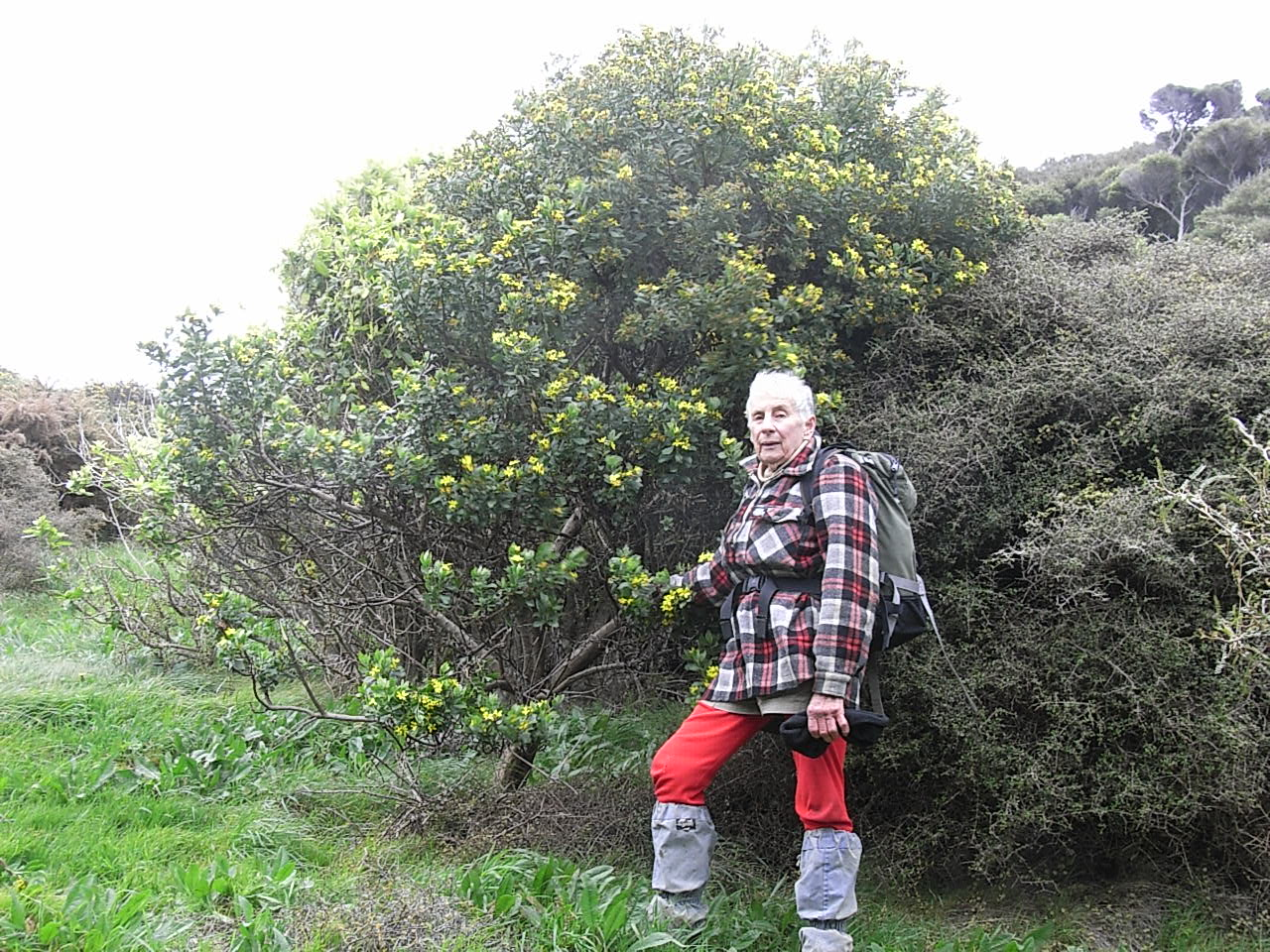
Mitcalfe botanising in Whitireia Regional Park

Mitcalfe was a vocal advocate for the conservation of New Zealand's native bush and reserves. In the 1980s she led the negotiations to save Te Mārua Bush from a proposed State Highway 2 expansion. After the success of these negotiations, she helped facilitate cooperation between the Greater Wellington Regional Council and the Wellington Botanical Society to restore this forest. Mitcalfe appeared before the Environment Court and successfully argued against the clearance of Larsen Crescent Bush for a proposed subdivision. She advocated for the halting of quarrying on the south coast of Wellington as well as for the planting of northern rātā rather than pōhutukawa. She also successfully advocated for the purchase of land in Stokes Valley by the Hutt City Council which would subsequently be known as Horoeke Scenic Reserve.

== Botanical writing ==
She was a prolific writer of journal and newsletter articles, plant lists and reports to and for the Department of Conservation and various Wellington regional and city councils. Publications she contributed to included the 2002 pamphlet NZ Native Plants Recommended for Restoration and/or Amenity Purposes in Wellington Regional Parks, the Department of Conservation's Native plants for stream sides in Wellington Conservancy and the 1999 Wellington Regional Native Plant Guide.

== Family ==
Mitcalfe was married to writer Barry Mitcalfe and had five children with him. Her partner, as well as botanical collaborator, for the later portion of her life was Chris Horne.

== Death ==
Mitcalfe died on 7 January 2017. A celebration of her life was held at the Tapu Te Ranga Marae surrounded by the native plantings she had helped to establish.

== Selected works ==
- Mitcalfe, Barbara (2014). Ahipara Pre-School 1959–1963 : the first Māori pre-school's first four years. Wellington. ISBN 978-0-473-30895-7. OCLC 898147375.
- Barbara Mitcalfe (2014). "Wellington Botanical Society and Te Mārua Bush" (PDF). Wellington Botanical Society Bulletin. 55: 84–110. ISSN 0110-6708. Wikidata Q114350611.
- Leon Perrie; Peter Russell; Colin Ogle; Barbara Mitcalfe; Chris Horne; Eleanor Burton; Jeremy Rolfe; Rewi Elliot (2011). "Non-local indigenous New Zealand vascular plants self-propagating in Wellington" (PDF). Wellington Botanical Society Bulletin. 53: 23–47. ISSN 0110-6708. Wikidata Q114350599.
- Barbara Mitcalfe; Chris Horne (2002). "Rediscovery of a nationally rare tussock in Makara Foreshore Reserve, Owhariu Bay, Wellington" (PDF). Wellington Botanical Society Bulletin. 48: 23–24. ISSN 0110-6708. Wikidata Q114350689.
