= Marie Bell (educationalist) =

New Zealand teacher, lecturer, educationalist (1922–2012)

Marie Bell CNZM
- Born: Marie Heron; 19 February 1922; Wellington, New Zealand
- Died: 3 November 2012 (aged 90); Wellington, New Zealand
- Occupations: Educationalist; lecturer; teacher
- Years active: 1943–2012
- Spouses: Paetahi Metekingi (m. 1943; died 1945); James Bell (m. 1954; died 1997)
- Children: 3

Academic background
- Education: Victoria University of Wellington
- Thesis: The Pioneers of Parents' Centre: Movers and Shakers for Change in the Philosophies and Practices of Childbirth and Parent Education in New Zealand (2004)
- Doctoral advisor: Carmen Dalli, Helen May

Marie Bell CNZM (née Heron; 19 February 1922 – 3 November 2012) was a New Zealand educationalist, lecturer and teacher who had a career lasting almost three-quarters of a century. Her career was governed by a child-friendly and progressive outlook that she was exposed to at Wellington Teachers' College. Bell was a supervisor and teacher who introduced a child-led education philosophy to allow children to learn in their own development and interests into New Zealand schools. She also worked for various associations, committees, conferences, commissions and educational boards to further early childhood learning.

== Early life ==
Bell was born Marie Heron on 19 February 1922 in Wellington, New Zealand. She was the oldest of three children, to the Rongotai College teacher Albert John George Heron and his wife Olive Marcia Mackie. She had a happy childhood in her household and did not focus on competition and examinations at Wellington East Girls' College; both of her parents valued education, and her father asked her to "be a good woman." Bell contracted bell's palsy during her final year at the college. Convinced she could not pass blackboard drawing, in 1939 she enrolled at Wellington Teachers' College to become a primary school teacher, and she also studied for a arts degree at Victoria University College at the same time.

== Career ==
At Teachers' College, Bell came across a child-friendly and progressive that governed her career; such practices were not common in New Zealand during that period. She joined the Teachers’ College Māori club and the Ngāti Pōneke Young Māori Club in Wellington, Bell learnt Māori and committed herself to Māori education for life. In 1943, she taught at Te Kaha Native School in Māori. Bell was offered employment at a sole-charge school in Matahiwi on the Whanganui River. This gave her importance in the local Māori community until an application from a male service person required her to relinquish her role. Bell consequently went back to Wellington to continue studying at Victoria University College and worked as a teacher. She earned a Bachelor of Arts degree in 1947, and a Diploma of Education two years later, after advice from the professor of education at Victoria University College Colin Bailey. Her thesis was on a preschool suitable for Māori children.

Bell was offered a place on a teaching course the University of London, and used a war pension to travel to the United Kingdom by ship in 1949. She studied as a post-graduate at the university's London Institute of Education and was taught by child development theorists John Bowlby, Anna Freud and Dorothy Gardner. Bell's diploma focused on life's beginning and realised the possible extensive harm to children by raising them in a strict and highly organised manner. She also worked at nursery schools to observe children who were aged five or under in the early stages of their development friendship wise, and undertook a teacher training course. The Bailey Report publisher Professor Bailey and the preschool officer Marie Gallagher met Bell in London and all three agreed to bring the latter's methodology to New Zealand.

In 1951, she returned to New Zealand and was appointed director of a Pahiatua kindergarten. Bell commuted weekly by bicycle, introduced dramatic play and asked mothers to assist. She later found this to be taxing to her family and left after two terms. Bell was made supervisor of junior classes at Wellington's Mount Cook School, and brought a child-led education philosophy to allow children to learn in their own development and interests. In 1953, she became a lecturer in junior education at Wellington Teachers’ Training College and interested trainees in her earlier ideas and provided teacher reacquainting courses. Bell worked at conferences and discussion evenings of the Association for the Study of Early Childhood. She left in 1954 after becoming pregnant. Bell worked part-time as a trainer of playcentre supervisors and educated parents and kindergarten students for 20 years.

She prepared evidence for presentation for the Parents Centres to the Consultative Committee on Infant and Pre-School Health Services in 1959 and the Royal Commission on Education two years later. With the former, Bell helped to allow mothers to keep their babies in a hospital room after childbirth and remain with unwell hospitalised children overnight. In 1960, she partook in a maternity services review that caused controversy with the National Council of Women of New Zealand. Bell and a group of parents established Wellington's parent co-operative and liberal Matauranga School in 1963, and became its first head teacher after some convincing. She taught there from 1963 to 1971.

Bell subsequently briefly lectured at the Kindergarten Teachers’ College in Wellington, and later as an education officer for the Department of Education in its training squad between 1974 and 1982. She noted that women were regularly interrupted during meetings and developed a training workshop and was invited to give this at meetings. Bell gave professional development and certifications for early childhood educators and helped to unify the early education sector. In 1976, she led the Prime Minister's Conference on Women in Social and Economic Development and helped to give the relationship between early childhood educations and women's role into politics. Bell served on the Wellington High School’s Parent Teacher Association and later the Wellington School Board during that decade, and was required to retire aged 60 in 1982.

In retirement, she was the Parents Centre inaugural travelling training officer, was appointed to the Victoria University of Wellington's council in 1985 to provide women with a viewpoint, chaired the Teachers' Appeal Board and the Area Health Board Steering Committee. Bell also oversaw the transfer of state-operated childcare services away from the Department of Social Welfare to the Department of Education, sat on the Department’s Curriculum Review Committee, educated trainee teachers at the Wellington College of Education and simultaneously tutoring at Victoria University of Wellington. She was a member of the New Zealand Labour Party and held various positions in the Rongotai electorate. Bell enrolled at Victoria University of Wellington and graduated with a Doctor of Philosophy on a dissertation on the oral history concerning the early pioneers of the Parents' Centre in 2004. At the age of 83, she was the university's oldest graduate in its history.

== Private life ==
She married Paetahi "Pat" Metekingi against parental consent on 14 May 1943. She had one son with him. Pat was killed in Second World War action in Faenza, Italy in January 1945. Bell's second marriage to airline clerk James "Jim" Bell from 14 January 1954 to 1997 resulted in the birth of a daughter and a son.

In the 2006 Queen's Birthday Honours, Bell was appointed a Companion of the New Zealand Order of Merit, for services to early childhood education.

Bell died in Wellington on 3 November 2012. At the time of her death, she was completing a history of her attempt to bring a liberal educational methodology to Matauranga School.

== Personality and legacy ==
Bell was a feminist. According to Elizabeth Cox of the Dictionary of New Zealand Biography, Bell's works over a period of near to three-quarters of a century helped to "she influenced the lives of thousands of teachers, parents and children in New Zealand."
