= Sally Peters =

New Zealand professor of education

Academic background
- Education: University of Waikato
- Thesis: "Crossing the border" : An interpretive study of children making the transition to school (2004)
- Doctoral advisor: Jennifer Young-Loveridge, Monica Anne Payne

Sally Peters is a New Zealand early childhood academic, and is a full professor at the University of Waikato, specialising in the transition from early childhood education to school, children's learning and development, and transitions at other life stages.

== Academic career ==
Peters first completed a Diploma of Education at the University of Waikato, starting in 1987. She followed this with a Bachelor of Education, a Master of Education, and then completed a PhD titled "Crossing the border": An interpretive study of children making the transition to school at Waikato. Peters then joined the faculty of Victoria University of Wellington, in the Institute of Early Childhood Studies. Peters returned to the University of Waikato in 2000, and was appointed full professor in 2023. As of 2024 she is Head of Te Kura Toi Tangata School of Education Operations.

Peters research focuses on children's learning and development, and in particular transitions. She began researching transitions from early childhood education to school, but moved on to include transitions at other life stages, and other kinds of transitions, such as transitions in thinking. She also researches edges and liminal spaces in a variety of contexts, such as cultural borders. Peters and Vanessa Paki co-led the New Zealand parts of a five-country international project, which was funded from the International Research Staff Exchange Scheme, and was called Pedagogies of Educational Transition [POET].

Peters was involved in the 2017 refresh of the early childhood education curriculum Te Whāriki, and is on the Ministry of Education's Curriculum Voices Group, which advises on the implementation of the refreshed curriculum.

Peters is the anthology editor for The Bloomsbury Handbook of Early Childhood Transitions Research, along with Aline-Wendy Dunlop of the University of Strathclyde and Sharon Lynn Kagan, of Columbia University.

== Selected works ==
=== Books and reports ===
- Hartley, Carol; Smith, Jemma; Carr, Margaret Ann; Rogers, Pat; Peters, Sally (2012). Crossing the border | New Zealand Council for Educational Research. New Zealand Council for Educational Research. ISBN 978-1-927151-47-1. OL 37952179M. Wikidata Q124607400.
- Aline-Wendy Dunlop; Peters, Sally; Sharon Lynn Kagan (2024). The Bloomsbury Handbook of Early Childhood Transitions Research. Bloomsbury Publishing. ISBN 978-1-350-10913-1. OL 30062480M. Wikidata Q124607401.
- Carr, Margaret Ann; Peters, Sally; Davis, Keryn; White, Jocelyn (2013). Key Competencies, Assessment and Learning Stories | New Zealand Council for Educational Research. New Zealand Council for Educational Research. ISBN 978-1-927151-89-1. Wikidata Q124607402.
- Peters, Sally (2010). Literature review: Transition from early childhood education to school. Ministry of Education. ISBN 978-0-478-34287-1. Wikidata Q124607684.

=== Journal articles ===
- Peters, Sally (2007). "Playing Games and Learning Mathematics: The results of two intervention studies". International Journal of Early Years Education. 6 (1): 49–58. doi:10.1080/0966976980060105. Wikidata Q113183063.
- Peters, Sally; Keryn Davis (2011). "Fostering children's working theories: pedagogic issues and dilemmas in New Zealand". Early Years. 31 (1): 5–17. doi:10.1080/09575146.2010.549107. Wikidata Q124575916.
- Peters, Sally (2003). ""I Didn't Expect That I Would Get Tons of Friends More Each Day": Children's experiences of friendship during the transition to school". Early Years. 23 (1): 45–53. doi:10.1080/0957514032000045564. Wikidata Q124607370.
- Peters, Sally; Janette Kelly (2011). "Exploring children's perspectives: Multiple ways of seeing and knowing the child". Waikato Journal of Education. 16 (3). doi:10.15663/wje.v16i3.32. Wikidata Q124607371.
