= Barry Mitcalfe =

New Zealand poet, editor, and peace activist

Barry Mitcalfe (31 March 1930 – 1986) was a New Zealand poet, editor, and peace activist.

== Biography ==
Born in 1930 in Wellington, New Zealand, Mitcalfe studied at Victoria University of Wellington, where he received a Diploma in Education in 1962, and a Bachelor of Arts (with honours) in 1963. In the 1960s and early 1970s, he was a leader of the New Zealand movement against the Vietnam War, and co-edited several booklets on the issue. After the war ended, he became a leader of the New Zealand anti-nuclear movement. In 1981, he was a writer-in-residence at the South Australia College of Advanced Education, and in 1982 held an Ursula Bethell Residency in Creative Writing at the University of Canterbury. In 1977, he was awarded the Katherine Mansfield Fellowship in Menton.

== Family ==
Mitcalfe was married to the botanist and conservationist Barbara Mitcalfe.

== Published works ==
- Squid, Glenco, 1951.
- Thirty Poems, Hurricane House, 1960.
- Poetry of the Maori, Paul's Book Arcade, 1961.
- Salvation Jones, Torbay, 1962.
- Nine New Zealanders, Whitcombe & Tombs, Christchurch, 1963.
- The Long Holiday, Whitcombe & Tombs, Christchurch, 1964.
- Polynesian Studies, Wellington Teachers' Training College, 1964.
- Writing: poems, Wellington Teachers College Arts Council, 1969.
- Maori Poetry: The Singing Word, Victoria University Press, 1974.
- Moana, Seven Seas, 1975.
- Migrant, Caveman Press, 1975.
- I Say, Wait for Me, (short stories), Outrigger, 1976.
- Maori, Coromandel, 1980;
- The Square Gang, Faber, 1981.
- The North Sun, Moon, and Stars, Coromandel, 1982.
- Beach, Coromandel, 1982.
- Northland, Coromandel, 1984.
- Look to the Land, Coromandel, 1986.

== See also ==
- List of peace activists
