= Wellington College of Education =

New Zealand educational institution training teachers

Coordinates: 41.28843°S 174.76779°E

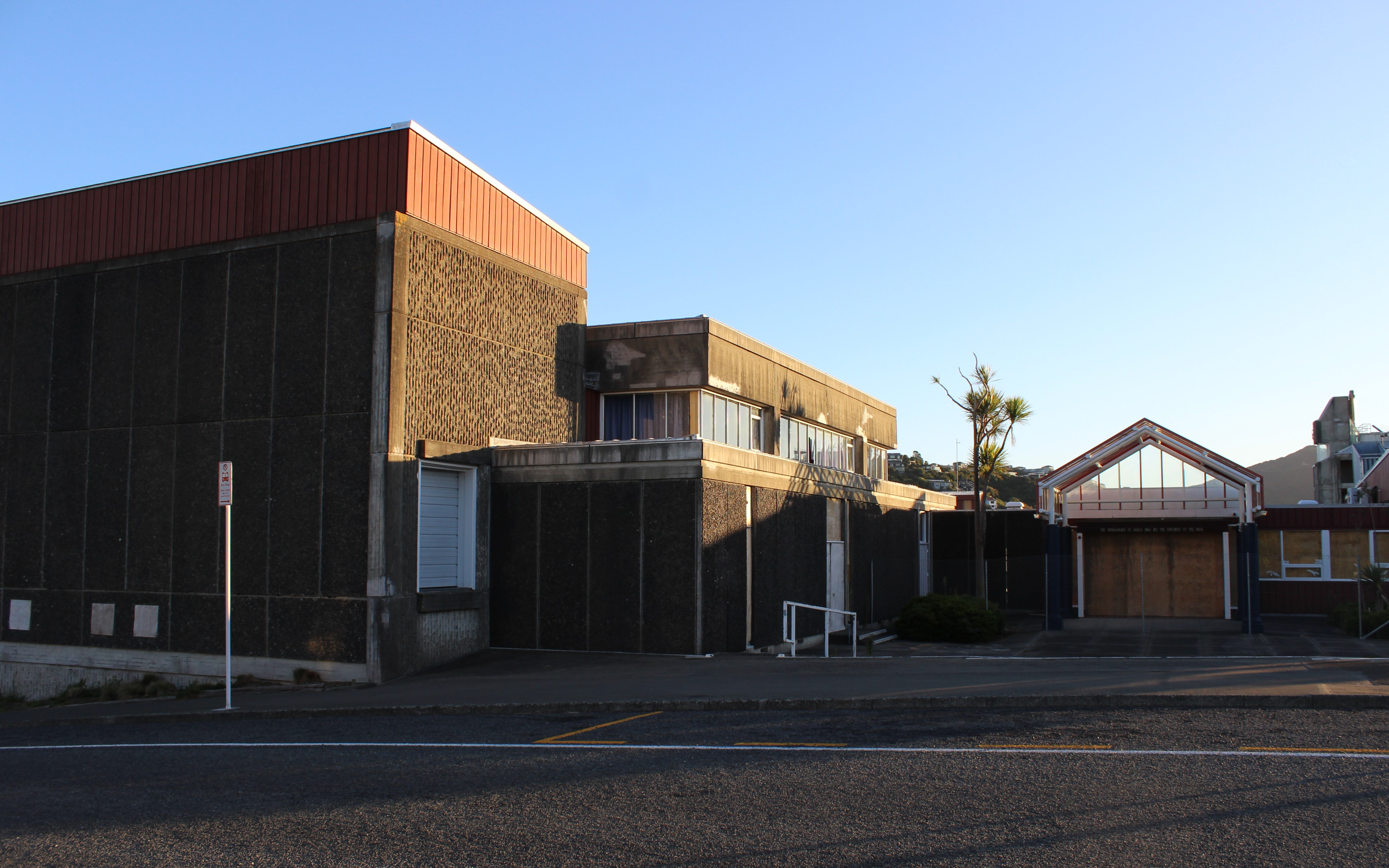
Main entrance and hall (in 2020)

Wellington College of Education (formerly Wellington Teachers' Training College) was established in 1888 with the purpose of educating teachers in New Zealand. It became the Faculty of Education of Victoria University of Wellington, formed from the School of Education (of the Faculty of Humanities of Social Sciences) of the University, and the Wellington College of Education on 1 January 2005.

From 1968 to 2016, it occupied an architecturally award winning campus in the Wellington suburb of Karori, designed by local architect William Toomath. The campus was awarded an NZIA Silver Medal (1972), and an NZIA Local Award (Enduring Architecture) (2005). The campus had many facilities including a marae called Ako Pai Marae that was closed in 2016.

== History ==
Wellington Teachers’ Training College had a 125th anniversary in 2005, the College having been originally established in 1880.

A decision to expand the teacher training facilities in Wellington was made in the 1930s, however it was not until 1966 that the building of the Karori campus began. There were teacher training reforms in the mid-twentieth centenary that were triggered by increased populations after World War Two. The campus was architecturally significant and had a Category 1 rating by Heritage New Zealand. It was transferred from the Ministry of Education to Victoria University of Wellington in 2004 for $10. It was sold by Victoria University of Wellington to Ryman Healthcare in 2017 for $28 million. Two of the heritage buildings were subsequently planned for demolition as part of the development by Ryman's, with Historic Places Wellington stating this would be a "significant cultural loss". A local group proposed the hall and cafeteria be retained for community use.

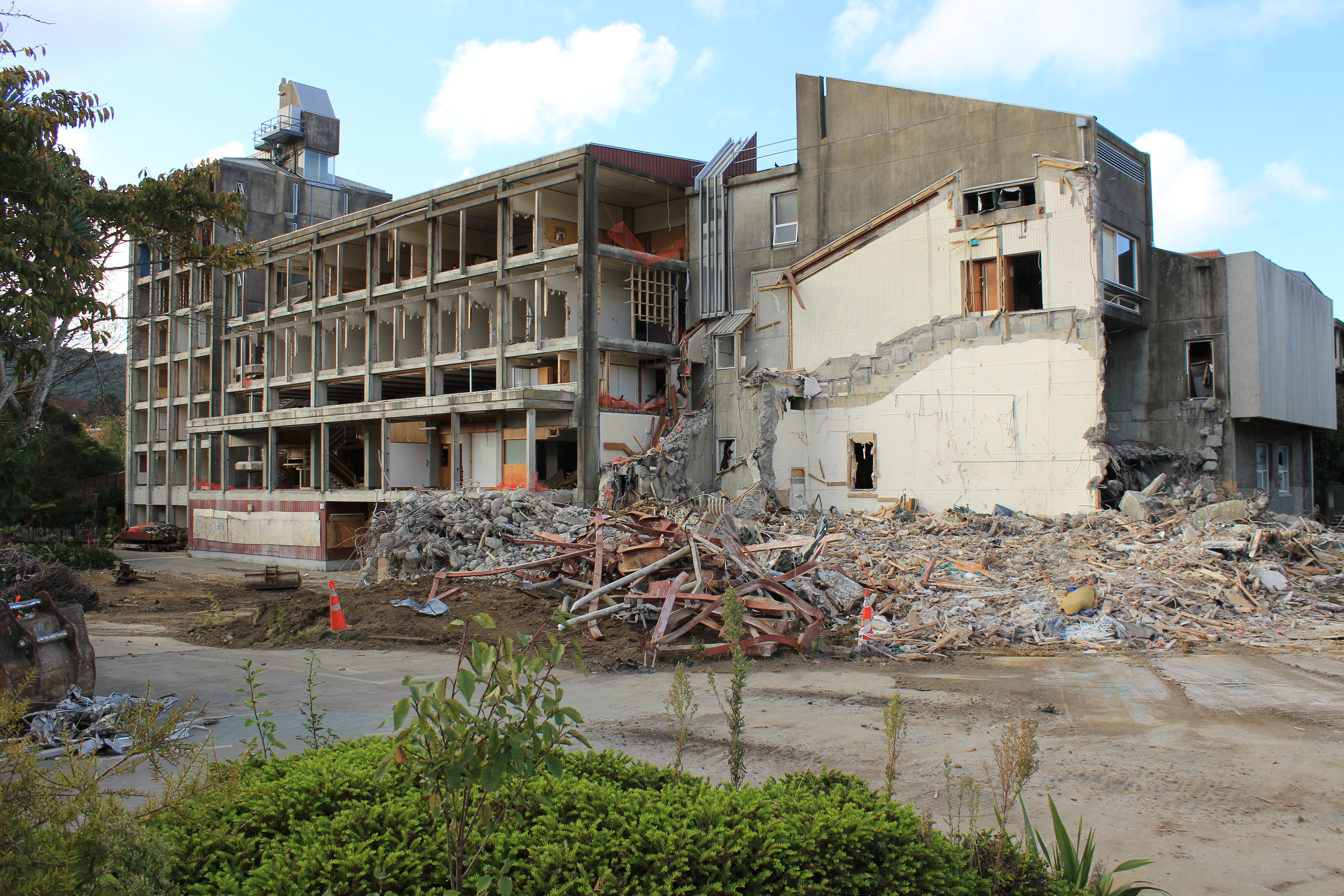
Part way through demolition in 2020

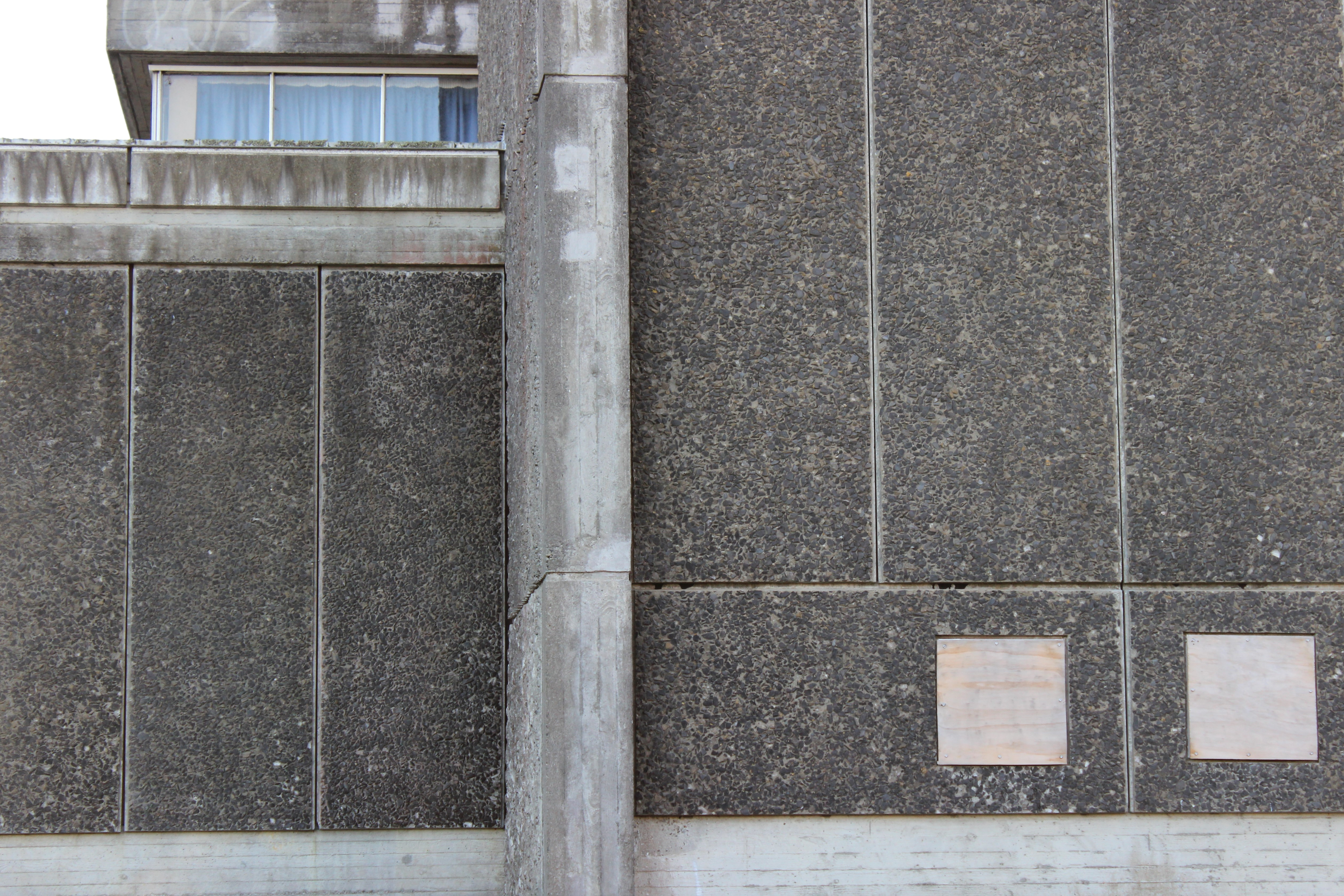
Architectural detail

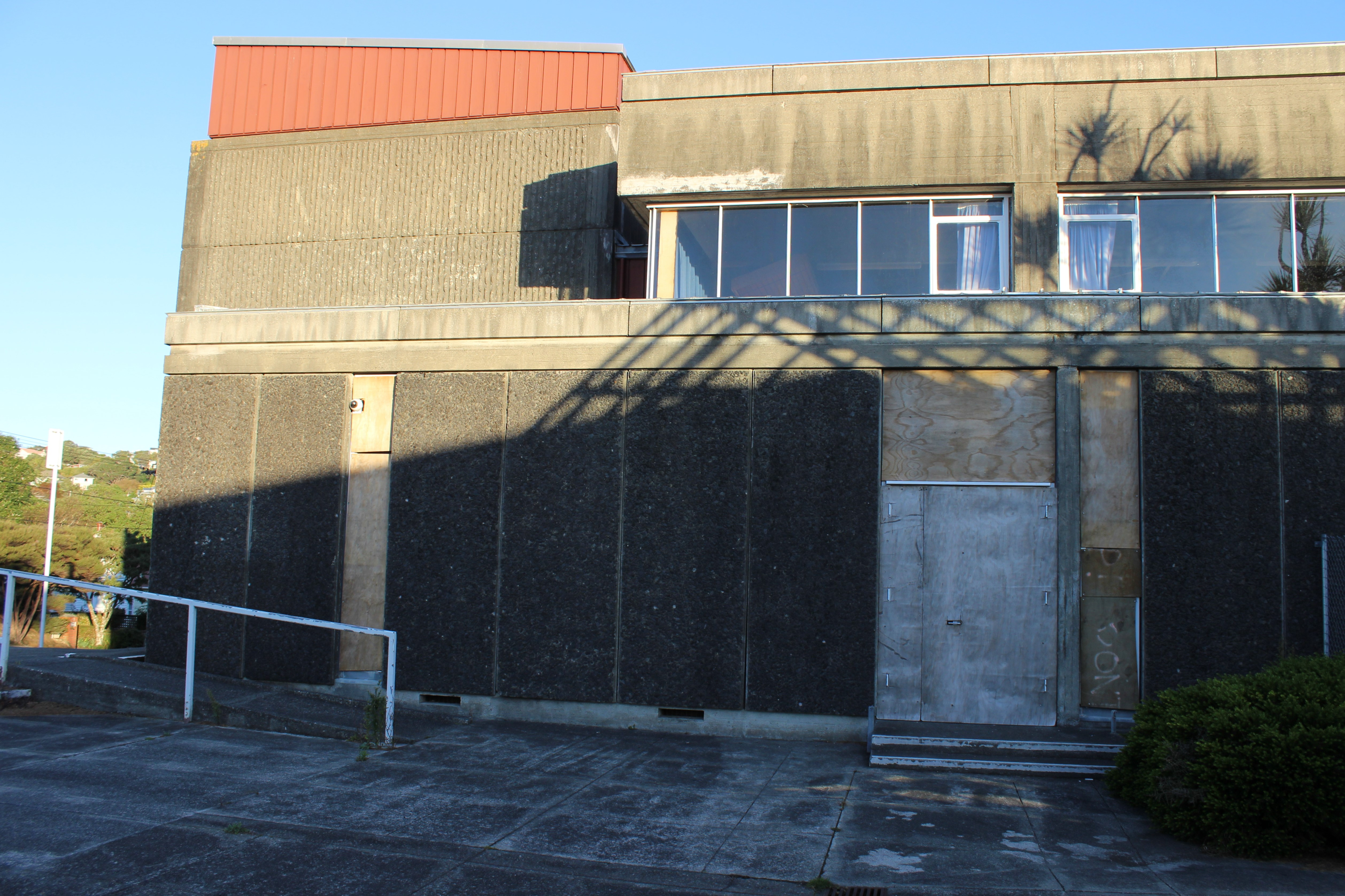
Side of the hall

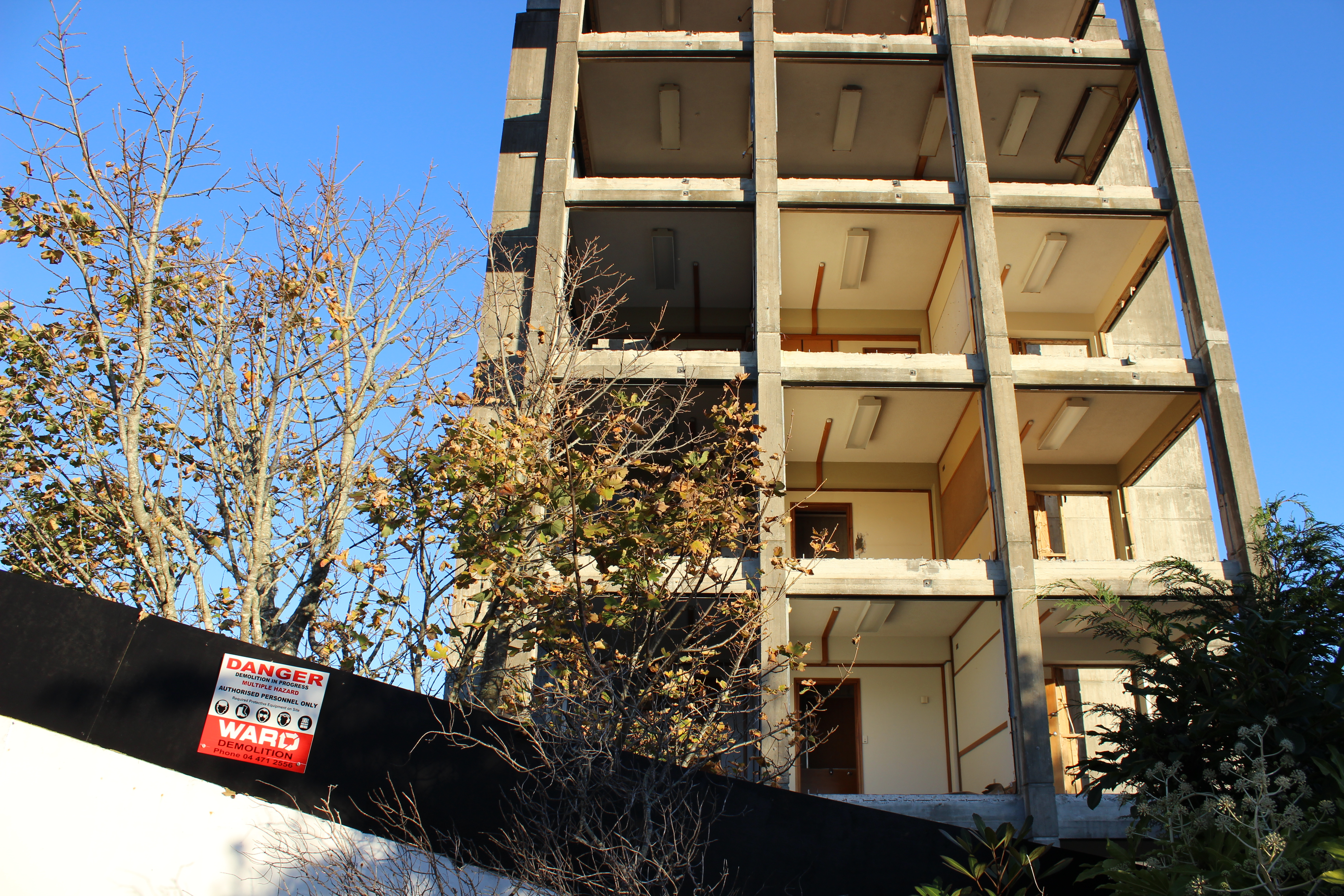
Tower block during demolition

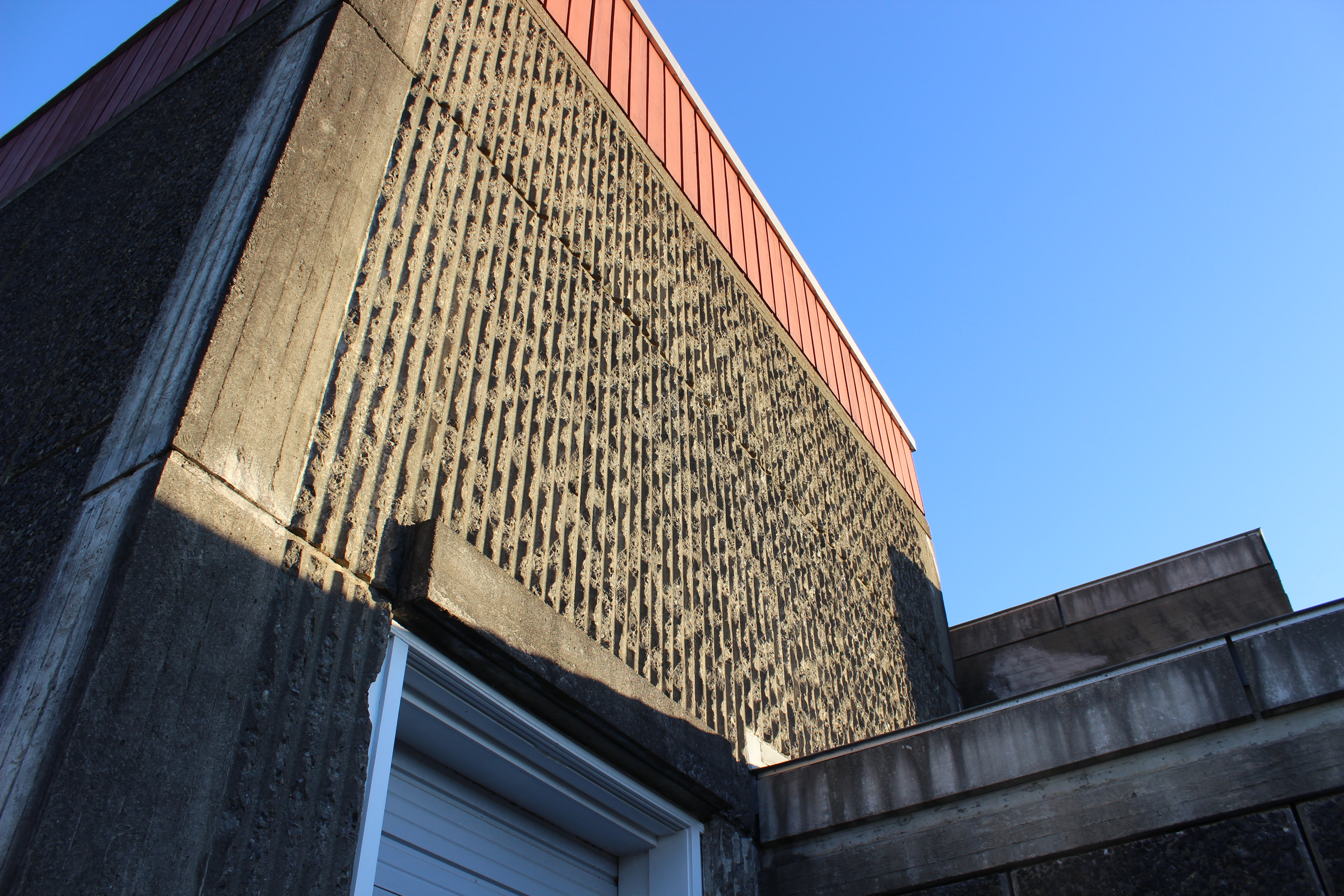
Architectural detail

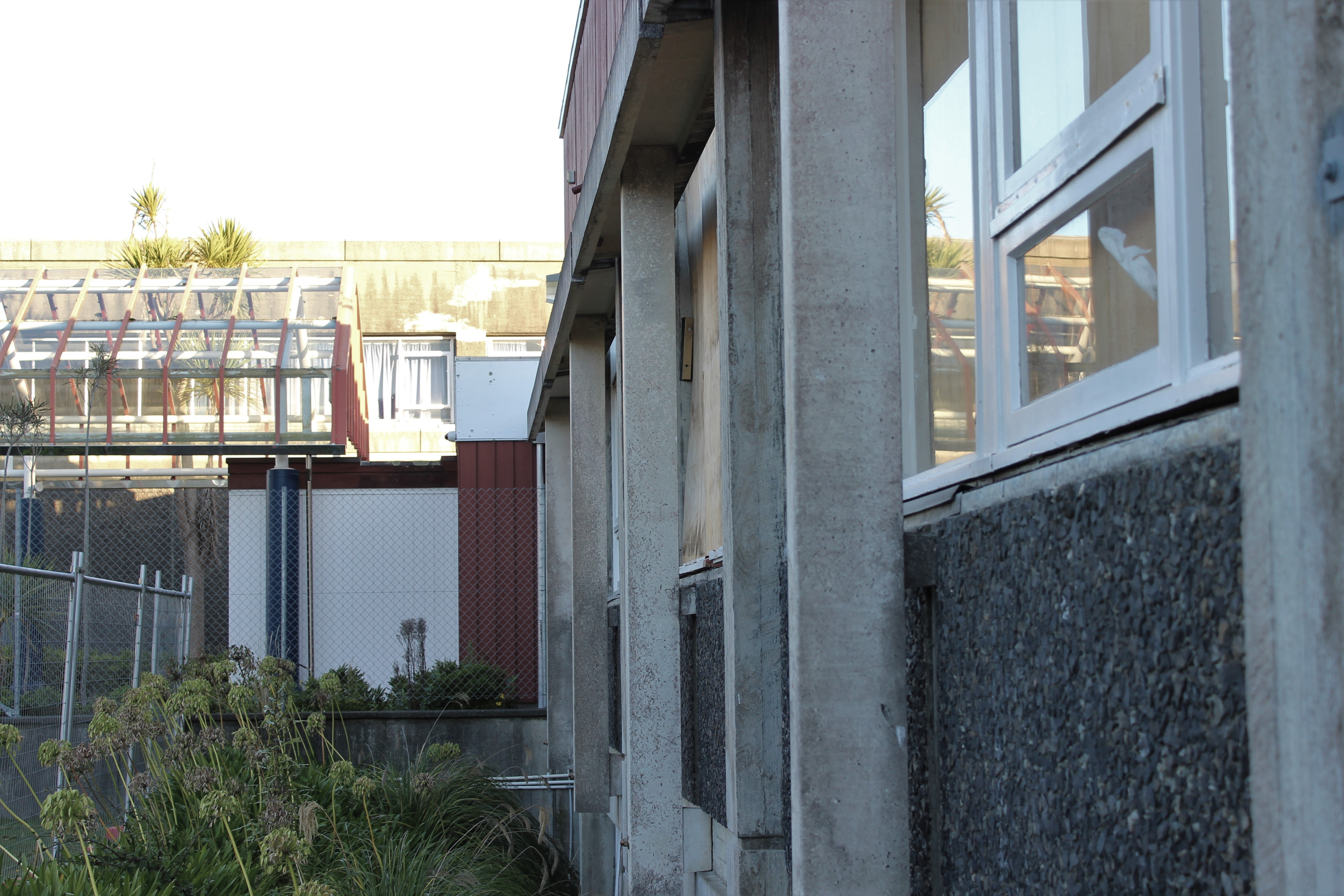

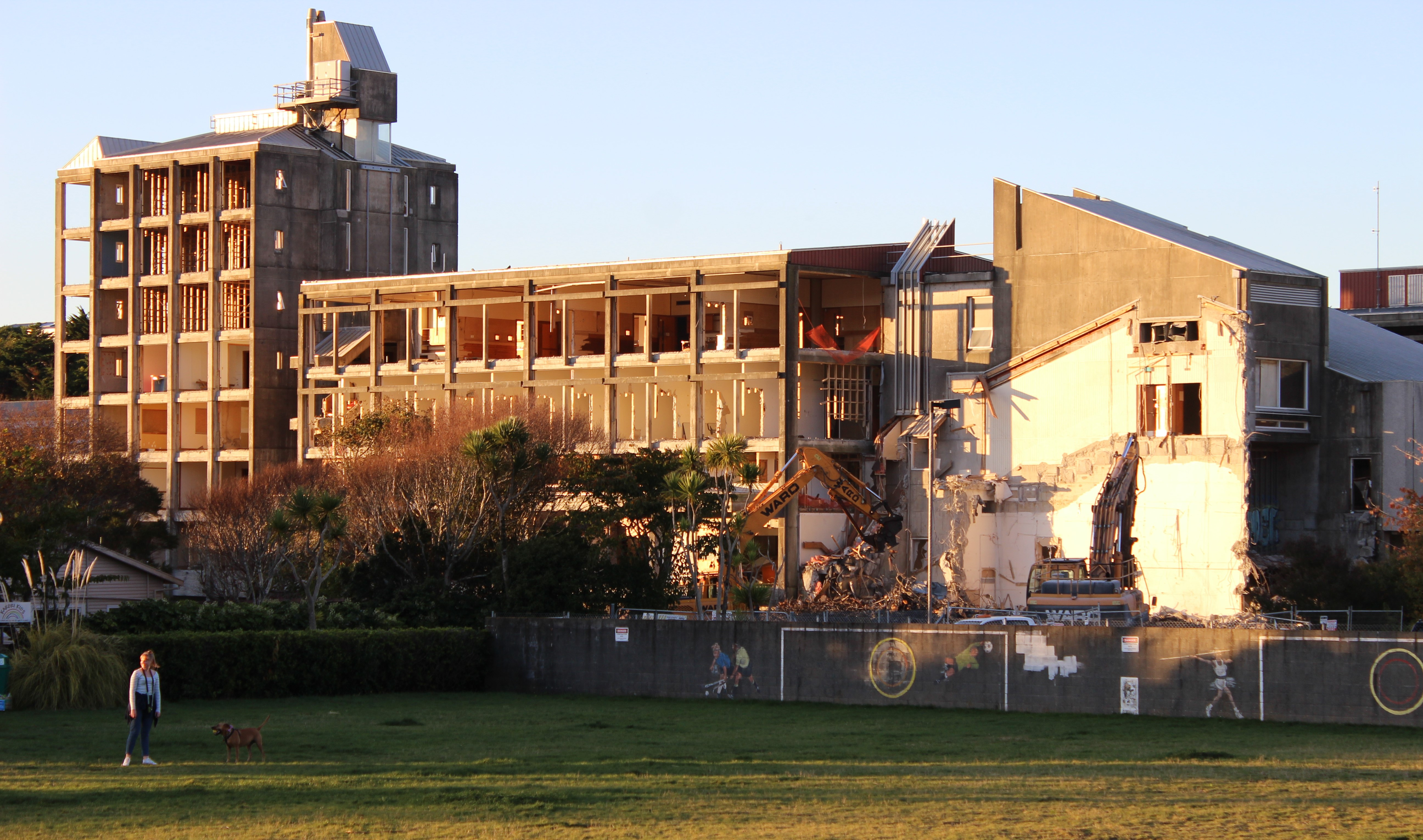

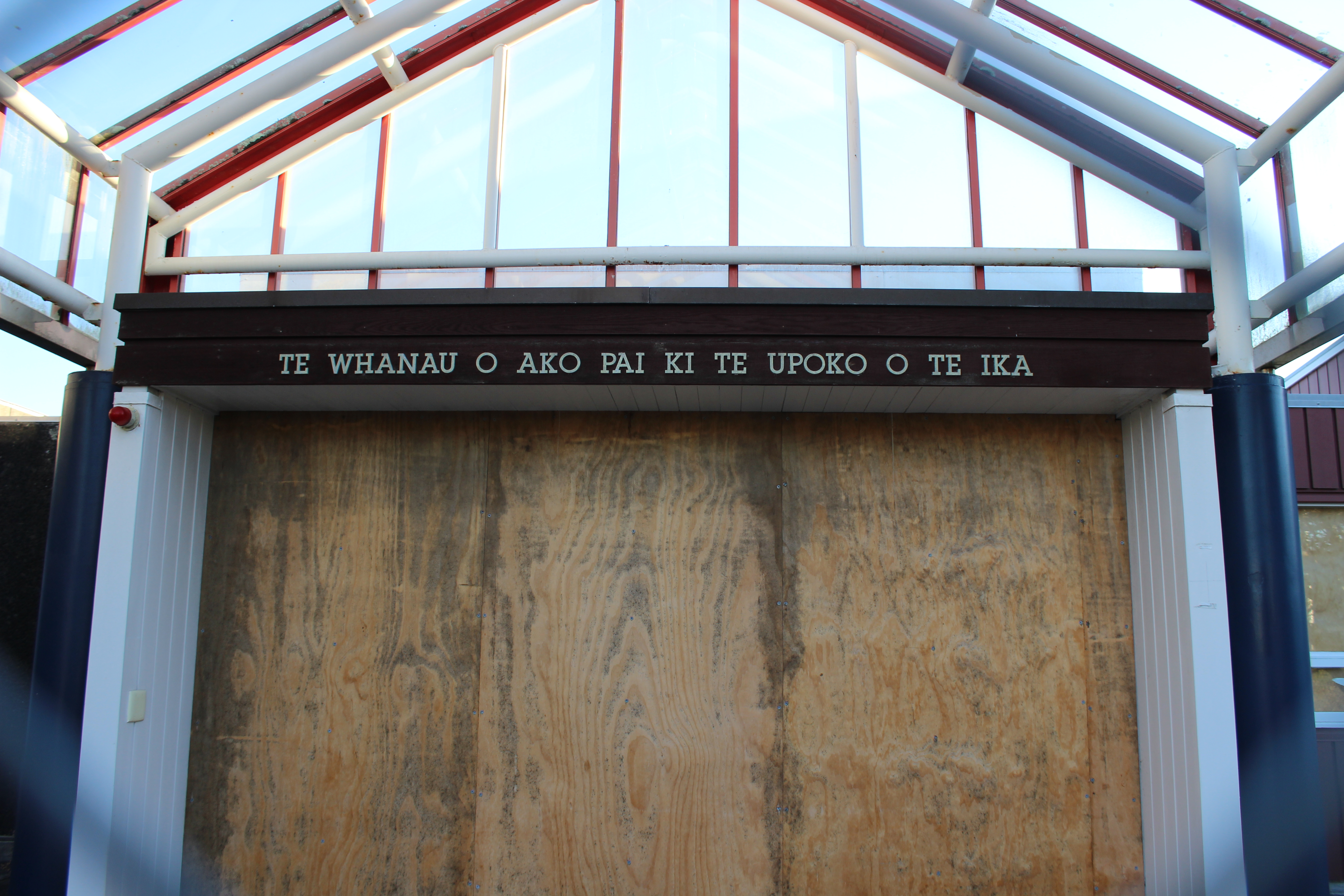
'Te Whanau o Ako Pai o te Upoko o Te Ika' - sign over main entrance

The faculty has had many notable teachers and students over its long history, significantly in New Zealand’s education system, arts sector and Māori rights movement.

Māori studies was introduced in 1963 with the appointment of Barry Mitcalfe in the Department of Social Studies. Tīpene O'Reagan joined Mitcalfe in 1968 and then redesigned the programme in 1972 when Mitcalfe left.

Author David McGill, who attended in the early 1960s, says of his experience:

As students, we all wore desert boots, fishermen's knit jerseys. We'd go to cafes and pubs. Barrett's was the nearest pub, or the George. Girls weren't allowed into pubs, so we'd go into coffee bars with them. Those were the days, at that wonderful teachers' college in Karori, with liberal teachers like Jack Shallcrass.

Wellington Teachers Training College was renamed the Wellington College of Education in 1988 in line with government policy.

== Notable staff ==
- Fanny Irvine-Smith lectured in New Zealand history and Māori culture until 1932 and was president of the Wellington Teachers College dramatic society.
- Doreen Blumhardt (b1914), head of the Art Department in the early years.
- Apirana Mahuika (b1934) Māori leader and chair of Te Rūnanga o Ngāti Porou.
- Olive Smithells (b1920), lecturer in health and physical education.
- Barry Mitcalfe, Department of Social Studies (1963 - 1972)
- Tīpene O'Regan (b1939) Senior Lecturer in Māori studies - started in 1972
- Jan Bolwell, Head of Performing Arts (1987-1997)
- Jack Shallcrass (b1922) writer and educationalist.
- Keri Kaa, Senior Lecturer in Māori Studies (1979 - 1998), chair of ASTE, and member of the College Council.
- Geraldine McDonald, lecturer in Professional Studies (1971 - 1974)

== Notable alumni ==
=== Attended prior to 1960 ===
- Marie Bell (1922–2012), educationalist. Attended in 1939.
- Iritana Te Rangi Tāwhiwhirangi (1929–2025), advocate of Māori language education and the Kohanga Reo movement (1947–1948).
- Sydney Jones (1894–1982), National MP for Hastings (1949–1954).
- Alistair Campbell (1925–2009), poet, playwright, and novelist. Graduated in 1954.
- Cliff Whiting (1936–2017), Māori artist and teacher. Attended in 1955.
- Noel Hilliard (1929–1996), journalist and novelist. Graduated in 1955.
- Rose Pere (1937–2020), educationalist and spiritual leader. Attended in 1956 and 1957.
- Patricia Grace (born 1937), writer.

=== Attended in the 1960s and 1970s ===
- Margie Abbott (born 1958) businessperson and the wife of Tony Abbott, the 28th Prime Minister of Australia (attended in 1974).
- Helen Beaglehole (born 1946), children's author and historian. Attended 1978.
- Maureen Lander (born 1942), weaver and artist. Attended 1963.
- Robert Lord, playwright, attended in 1969 and 1970.
- Sam Hunt (born 1946), poet, attended in 1968.
- David McGill (born 1942), writer, attended early 1960s.

=== Attended in or after the 1980s ===
- Helen Kelly (1964–2016), trade unionist. Enrolled in 1983, she also became the president of the student association.
- Nina Nawalowalo (born 1963), theatre director and founder of The Conch theatre production company.

=== Dates of attendance unknown ===
- George Lowe (1924–2013), mountaineer.
- Roy Cowan (1918–2006), potter, illustrator, and printmaker.
- John Drawbridge (1930–2005), artist.
- Kahu Kaa Jenkins (born 1941), educationalist, researcher and author.
- Diane Prince (born 1952), contemporary Māori artist and weaver.
