= Fanny Irvine-Smith =

NZ teacher, lecturer and writer (1878–1948)

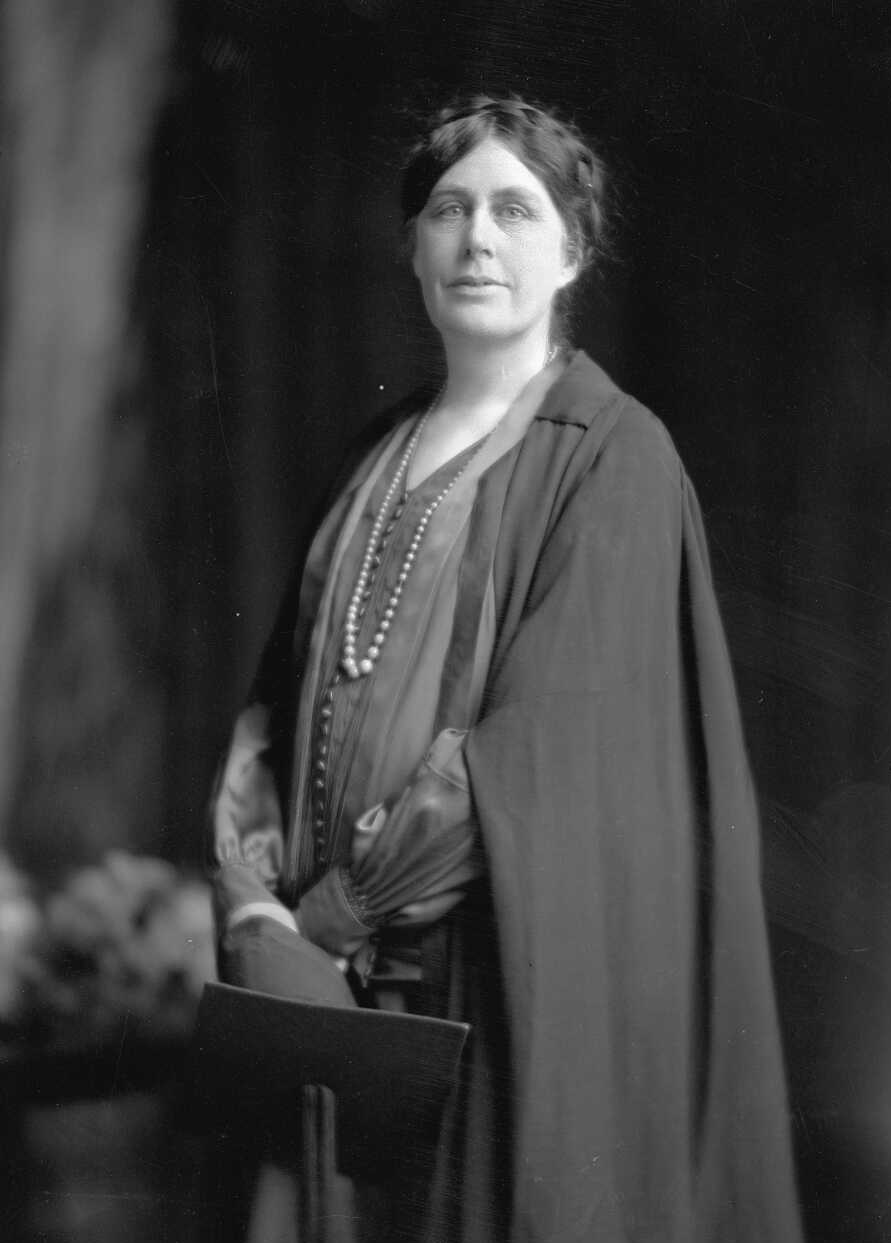
- Irvine-Smith in 1929
- Born: Napier
- Education: master's degree
- Occupation: Teacher
- Employer: Wellington College of Education

Fanny Louise Irvine-Smith (10 September 1878 – 20 December 1948) was a New Zealand teacher, lecturer and writer.

== Early life ==
Irvine-Smith was born in Napier, Hawke's Bay, New Zealand on 10 September 1878. Her father Thomas Smith died in a shipping accident when she was six months old, and her mother Margaret (née Sproule) later remarried.

== Education ==
Irvine-Smith attended Wellington Girls' College from 1892, and in 1897 began teaching at a private school in Thorndon. She continued her secondary school education however and completed her studies in 1898. In 1901 she entered Victoria University College, continuing to also teach in schools in Hawkes Bay and Taranaki, until finally graduating with a Bachelor of Arts degree in 1908. While a student, she was active in student clubs, and was co-founder and co-editor of the student magazine The Spike. She both wrote and drew sketches for the magazine for a number of years.

In 1920 Irvine-Smith returned to Victoria and completed a Master of Arts degree in History.

== Career ==
After completing her master's degree, Irvine-Smith moved from secondary school teaching to a lecturing position at the Wellington Teachers College. She lectured in New Zealand history and Māori culture, subjects rarely taught in New Zealand institutions at the time.

Irvine-Smith was also president of the Teachers' College dramatic society and encouraged many students to become involved in acting, both at the college and in Wellington's repertory theatres.

After retiring from lecturing in 1932, Irvine-Smith began researching Wellington's history, writing a book The Streets of My City, in which she examined the city's development through the names of its streets and the people who lived there. The book was published just after Irvine-Smith died in 1948, and the first edition sold out in two weeks. The book is still used as a resource on Wellington history to this day.

In 1947, Irvine-Smith successfully organised a petition to the Wellington City Council for a library to be established in the suburb of Khandallah.

== Legacy ==
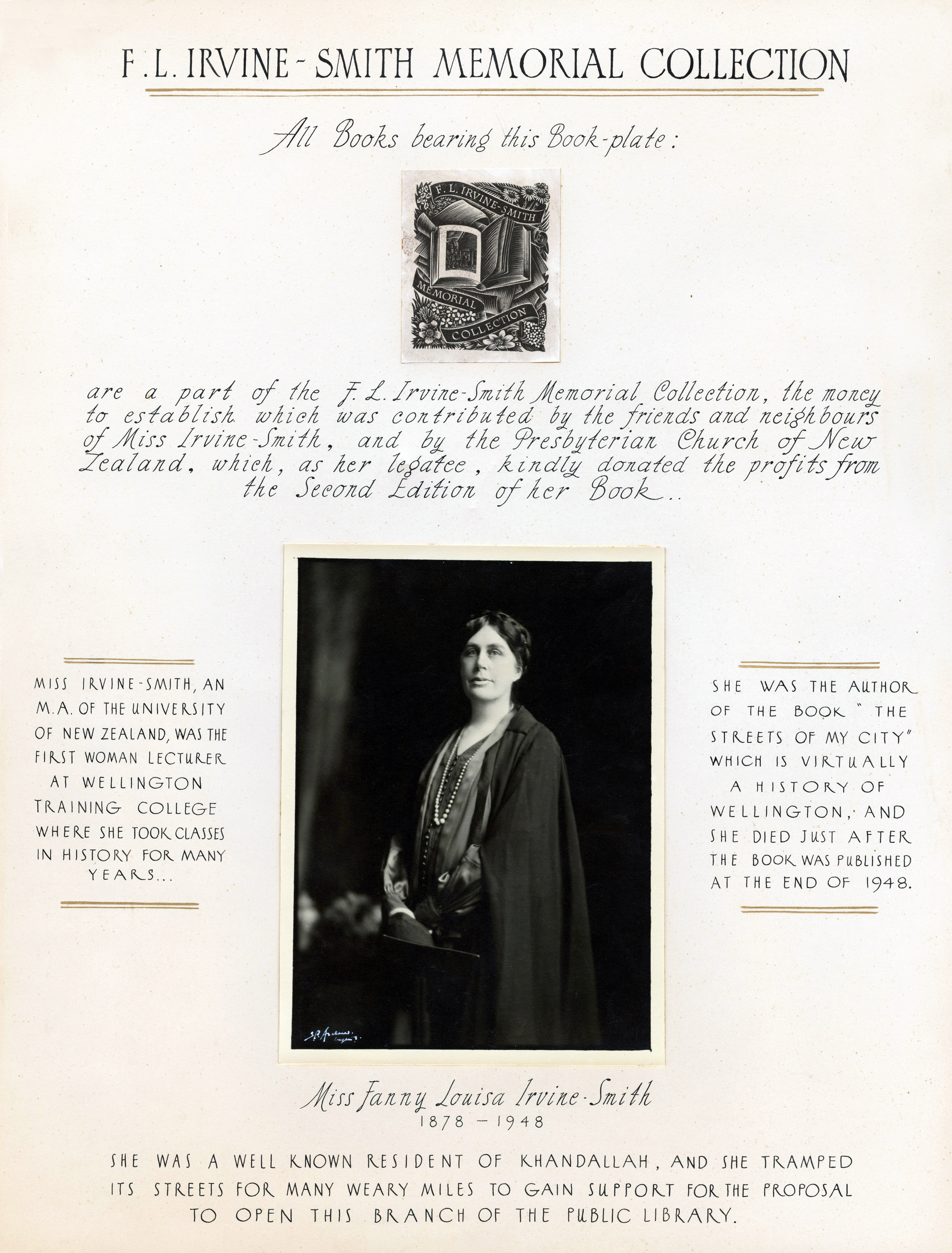
Fanny Irvine-Smith bookplate

The Khandallah Library has a F.L. Irvine-Smith Memorial Collection, a collection of New Zealand works purchased with funds from the royalties of Irvine-Smith's book.
