= Noel Hilliard =

New Zealand journalist and novelist

- Born: 6 February 1929; Napier, New Zealand
- Died: 22 October 1996 (aged 67)
- Education: Victoria University College, Wellington Teachers' College
- Occupation: writer
- Writing career
- Notable awards: Robert Burns Fellowship

Noel Harvey Hilliard (6 February 1929 – 22 October 1996) was a New Zealand journalist and novelist.

== Background ==
Hilliard was born in 1929 in Napier, New Zealand. He married Kiriwai Mete in 1954 and they were to have two sons and two daughters. Hilliard gained his education at Kotemaori Primary School, Raupunga Maori School, Kopuawhara Primary School, and Gisborne High School. He attended Victoria University College and Wellington Teachers' College; he gained a teacher's certificate in 1955.

In 1971, Hilliard was the recipient of the Robert Burns Fellowship.

Hilliard's wife died in 1990; at the time they were living at Titahi Bay in Wellington. His death was announced in the December 1996 edition of Booksellers News.

== Works ==
=== Fiction ===
- Māori Girl (Heinemann, 1960)
- A Piece of Land: Stories and Sketches (Robert Hale, 1963)
- Power of Joy (Michael Joseph, 1965)
- A Night at Green River (Whitcombe and Tombs,1969)
- Māori Woman (Whitcombe and Tombs, 1974)
- Send Somebody Nice (Robert Hale, 1976)
- Selected Stories (John McIndoe, 1977)
- The Glory and the Dream (Heinemann, 1978)

=== Non-Fiction ===
- We Live by a Lake (with Ans Westra; Heinemann, 1972)
- Wellington: City Alive (with Ans Westra; Whitcoulls, 1976)
- Mahitahi: Work Together: Impressions of the USSR (Progress Publishers, 1989)
- Nude Chooks Stun Farmer! (with Bill Paynter; Reed, 1992)
