= Jean Mitchell (netball) =

New Zealand netball player (1913–1999)

Personal information
- Full name: Jean Logan Mitchell
- Born: 1 September 1913 Christchurch, New Zealand
- Died: 9 March 1999 (aged 85)

Netball career
- Playing positions: GD, GK
Years	National team	Caps
1938	New Zealand	1

Jean Logan Mitchell (1 September 1913 – 9 March 1999) was a New Zealand netball player. She was vice-captain of the New Zealand team in their first Test match, in 1938 against Australia.

== Early life and family ==
Born in the Christchurch suburb of Shirley on 1 September 1913, Mitchell was the daughter of Rebecca Mitchell (née Todd) and Archibald Mitchell. She was educated at Wellington East Girls' College, where she captained the school netball team.

== Netball career ==
=== Domestic ===
Mitchell played representative netball for Wellington from 1932 to 1937, and captained the Wellington East Old Girls 'A' team that won the 1937 Wellington club competition. In 1938, she was described as a "strong, reliable defence, ever ready to change tactics when required".

=== International ===
In 1938, Mitchell was named as vice-captain of the New Zealand national netball team that travelled to Australia and competed in the Australian interstate tournament in Melbourne. At times, the New Zealand team struggled as the matches were played on grass courts under Australian rules, which differed from those used in New Zealand at the time, but they defeated Queensland 13–9, before losing to Victoria 16–48 However, in an exhibition match played under New Zealand rules, the New Zealand team beat Victoria 19–5. In New Zealand's remaining matches of the tournament, they were defeated by South Australia 14–47 and Tasmania 17–32, before overcoming New South Wales 21–18. Mitchell played in all of the games, except against Tasmania.

Mitchell appeared in the single Test match, the first played between New Zealand and Australia, in Melbourne on 20 August 1938. New Zealand were defeated 11–40 in the match, which was played under Australian rules.

== Later life and death ==
In her later years, Mitchell lived in Levin. She died on 9 March 1999, and her ashes were buried in The Avenue Cemetery, Levin.
