= Bronwen Cowie =

New Zealand academic

- Education: University of Waikato
- Scientific career
- Fields: Assessment for learning
- Workplaces: University of Waikato
- Thesis: Formative assessment in science classrooms (2000)

Bronwen Cowie is a New Zealand academic. As of 2018, she is a full professor at the University of Waikato.

== Academic career ==
After a 2000 PhD titled 'Formative assessment in science classrooms' at the University of Waikato, Cowie joined the staff, rising to full professor.

== Selected works ==
- Bell, Beverley, and Bronwen Cowie. "The characteristics of formative assessment in science education." Science education 85, no. 5 (2001): 536–553.
- Cowie, Bronwen, and Beverley Bell. "A model of formative assessment in science education." Assessment in Education: Principles, Policy & Practice 6, no. 1 (1999): 101–116.
- Bell, Beverley, Nigel Bell, and B. Cowie. Formative assessment and science education. Vol. 12. Springer Science & Business Media, 2001.
- Cowie, Bronwen. "Pupil commentary on assessment for learning." Curriculum Journal 16, no. 2 (2005): 137–151.
- Cowie, Bronwen, and Margaret Carr. "The consequences of socio-cultural assessment." Early childhood education: Society and culture (2004): 95–106.
