= Wellington East Girls' College =

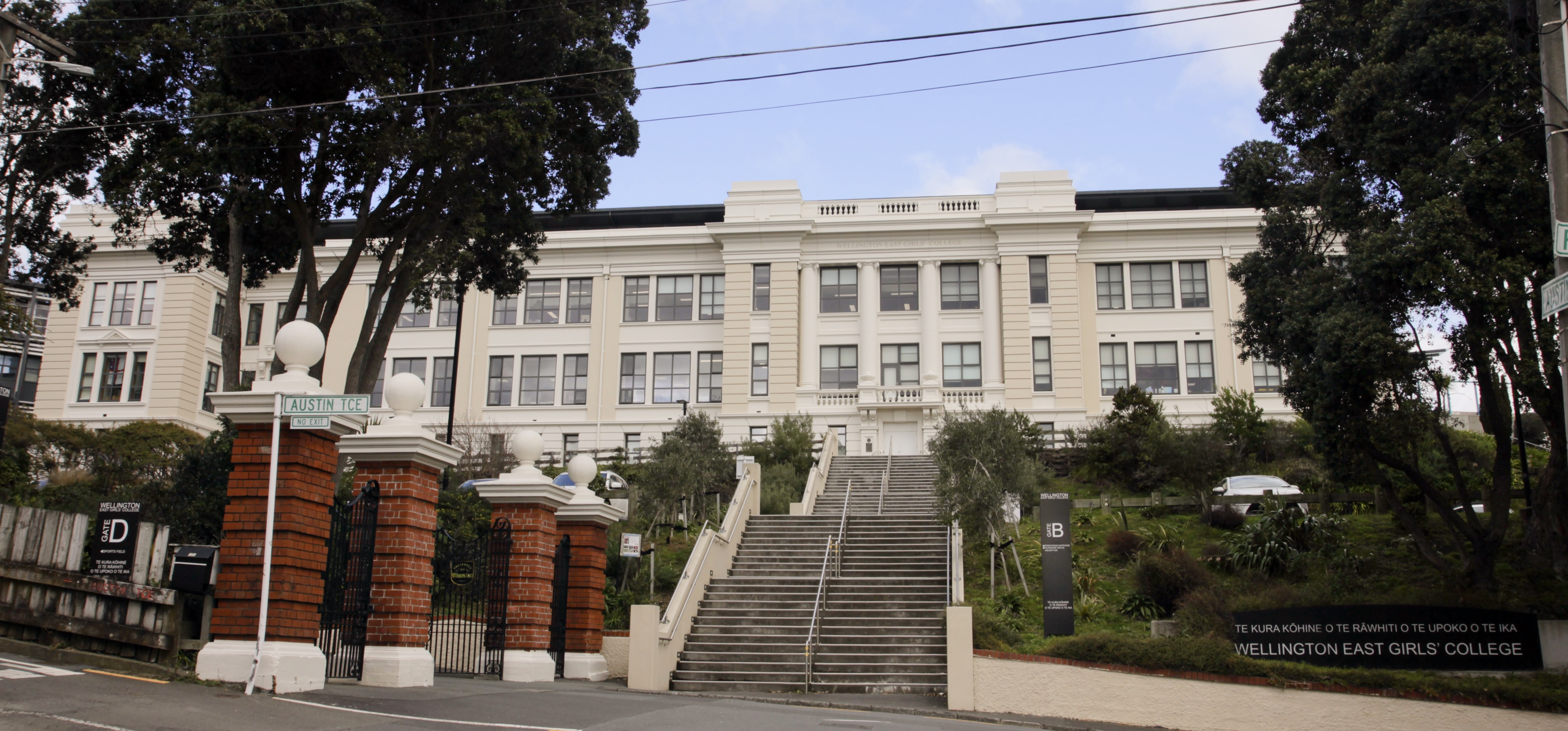

Location
- Austin Street, Mount Victoria, Wellington, New Zealand; 41.3028°S 174.7852°E

Information
- Type: Single Sex Girls State Secondary (Year 9–13)
- Established: 1925
- Ministry of Education Institution no.: 274
- Principal: Gael Ashworth
- Enrolment: 1,006 (July 2026)
- Socio-economic decile: 8P
- Website: www.wegc.school.nz

Wellington East Girls' College (WEGC, Maori name: Te Kura Kōhine o te Rāwhiti o Te Upoko o Te Ika) is a state single-sex girls' secondary school which sits directly above Mount Victoria Tunnel, Wellington, New Zealand. Serving Years 9 to 13 (ages 12 to 18), the school currently has 1,006 students.

The College primarily serves families of the eastern and southern suburbs and inner-city Wellington. However, it also has students from all over Wellington, the Hutt Valley and Porirua City, out of zone students being accepted in on a ballot. The school has a Special Needs Unit for about 20 students, some of whom are integrated into the school system.

== School leadership ==
The school's long time principal Janice Campbell retired during 2007 and Sally Haughton took up the position. In 2019 Gael Ashworth became principal.

Currently, the Senior Leadership Team consists of the principal herself and three deputy principals. There is also a principal's nominee – a staff member nominated by the principal who has responsibility for maintaining quality within the School to ensure the validity and credibility of assessment for qualifications according to the New Zealand Qualifications Authority (NZQA). The school has a Guidance team (composed of one international and five year-level deans, careers advisors, counsellors, and a Guidance Leader) as well as a sports director and many department heads.

Period	Principal
1925–1937	A. M. Batham
1937–1949	N. G. Isaac
1950–1957	M. L. Wilson
1957–1967	M. J. Riley
1968–1981	N. McMaster
1981–2007	Janice Campbell
2007–2019	Sally Haughton
2019–present	Gael Ashworth

== History ==
Wellington East Girls' College was built on reserve land bordering Wellington College in 1925, to cope with the demand for female education in Wellington at the time. By the end of the First World War, there were over 800 pupils at Wellington Girls’ High School (now Wellington Girls' College) in Thorndon, and teaching became severely hampered by the overcrowding – so much so that rooms in nearby houses were rented out to use as classrooms. Miss A. M. Batham, who had served on the staff at Wellington Girls' for 22 years and would be the first Headmistress of Wellington East, petitioned the Board of Governors repeatedly until it was agreed that a new school would be founded on the other side of the city. The school was originally named Mt Victoria Girls College but was changed to avoid confusion with Victoria University of Wellington, which was called Victoria University College at the time.

The school celebrates Founders Day annually on 15 September and held a 90th reunion on the date in 2015.

On 24 September 2024, the school was evacuated after receiving an email threat.

== Houses ==
In 1931, Headmistress Batham divided the school into six houses for sports competitions. These six houses were named Islington, Ranfurly, Onslow, Jellicoe, Fergusson, and Bledisloe, and were named after:

- The Lord Islington, the 15th Governor of New Zealand.
- Lieutenant-General The Lord Freyberg, the seventh Governor-General of New Zealand.
- William Onslow, 4th Earl of Onslow, the 11th Governor.
- John Jellicoe, 1st Earl Jellicoe, the second Governor-General.
- Sir Charles Fergusson, 7th Baronet, the third Governor-General.
- Charles Bathurst, 1st Viscount Bledisloe, the fourth Governor-General.

Sometime before 1950 both the Ranfurly and Freyberg Houses were renamed. They became Cobham and Freyberg, in honour of The Viscount Cobham (the ninth Governor-General) and Lieutenant-General The Lord Freyberg (the seventh Governor-General). In 1941 Freyberg and Cobham were dismantled and students in either became parts of the other four houses.

The four current houses at Wellington East Girls' College are:

- Sheppard
- Edgar
- Cooper
- Tirikatane

== Buildings and grounds ==
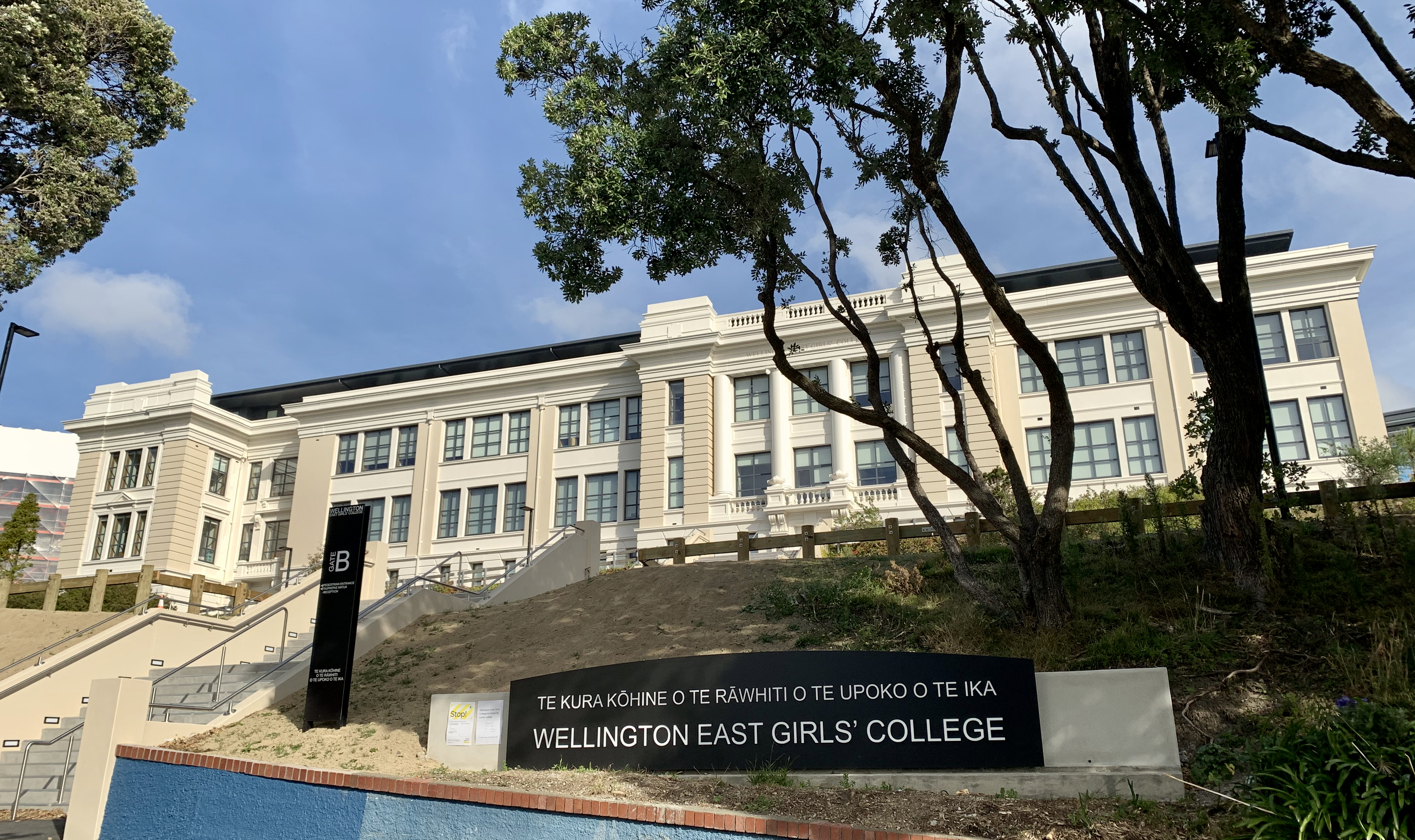
Wellington East Girls' College Main Building, April 2020

Wellington East Girls' College shares with Wellington College the administration of the Gifford Observatory.

The architecture of the original building is interwar stripped classical. The grand main building is registered by Heritage New Zealand as a Category 1 Historic Place.

In 2011, earthquake strengthening work was begun on the building, but was halted when engineers found it to meet just 17% of the national building standard (the minimum for existing buildings is 34%). The building, which was built in 1924, was empty until late 2014, when work restarted with the aim of replacing the building. The redevelopment project was to keep the façade of the old heritage building while a new multi-storey block was built behind it.

The old block held nine classrooms (not including the music department) which held 250 pupils, as well as the library, staffroom and offices.

After the closure of the Main Block, areas previously housed inside the building were forced to relocate. The Mathematics department, along with the School Office, Student Services Centre, Hauora Centre, and the Senior Management offices were all relocated to "The Village"; a set of pre-fabricated buildings on the old lower netball courts. When the new building opened the prefabs were removed and this area became a car park. The music department was located in a portion of the Main Block still usable until its demolition in 2014; it then moved to pre-fabricated buildings located on the top field. It is soon to be joined by another set of pre-fabricated buildings, which will house the Art Department until completion of renovation on the South Wing (built in 1966).

Most buildings on the school site are being redeveloped in some way or another. In 2016, the Sports Centre saw strengthening and repainting. The baths, which since construction in 1958 have already witnessed the removal of the diving pool (replaced by the Special Needs Unit), have undergone total reconstruction. The outdoor swimming pool has been covered over. Seemingly, the only buildings on site left untouched by the redevelopment will be the East Wing (built 1956) and the Science Block (Opened 1985).

In April 2019 the new Matairangi block opened, providing open-plan learning spaces, a new library, canteen, art studios, food technology rooms, music facilities and a media suite, along with a Maori learning space or Wharenui. The school, with this new building, is now able to cater to approximately 1250 students.

== He Huarahi Tamariki ==
He Huarahi Tamariki is a teen parent unit under the jurisdiction of Wellington East Girls' College. It serves approximately 50 teenage parents in Years 9–15 (age 12–19) in continuing secondary school education. The unit is largely autonomous and is located in Porirua, and incorporates the Griffin 2 School, an Early Childhood Centre that caters for the children of its students. It is noted that the Teen Parent Unit roll is returned with the one belonging to Wellington East Girls' College.

== Notable alumnae ==
Dates denote leaver or graduation year as student

=== Arts and humanities ===
- Marie Bell (1938) – educator
- Marie Clay (1942) – psychologist and researcher in education
- Joy Drayton (1932) – educator
- Avis Higgs (1935) – painter and textile designer
- Geraldine McDonald (1942) – academic and researcher in education
- Whetu Tirikatene-Sullivan (1949) – New Zealand politician and one of 20 holders of the Order of New Zealand
- Mary Varnham (1961) – writer and publisher and former Wellington City Councillor

==== Performing arts ====
- Sunny Amey (1945) – theatre director and educator
- Aivale Cole (formerly Mabel Faletolu) – opera singer
- Jennifer Compton (1966) – poet and playwright
- Rae de Lisle (1965) – pianist and educator
- Barbara Ewing (1955) – actor
- Chelsie Preston Crayford (2003) – actor
- Dawn Sanders (1968) – theatre scholar and founder of the Shakespeare's Globe Centre New Zealand
- Jennifer Ward-Lealand (1975) – screen and theatre actor

=== Science ===
- Brenda Shore (nee Slade) (1938) – botanist

=== Sport ===
==== Swimming ====
- Natasha Hind – Silver and Bronze medallist at the 2010 Commonwealth Games
- Meda McKenzie (1978) – first woman to complete a double crossing of the Cook Strait and the first to complete a circumnavigation of Rarotonga
- Emma Robinson (New Zealand swimmer) – 2016 Summer Olympics swimmer

==== Association football ====
- Cinnamon Chaney (1988) – New Zealand international player
- Maria George – New Zealand international player
- Wendi Henderson (1987) – New Zealand international player
- Renee Leota (2007) – New Zealand international player

==== Cricket ====
- Linda Henshilwood (1967) – New Zealand Women's cricket team

==== Hockey ====
- Niniwa Roberts (1994) – Black Sticks team member and Olympic athlete in 2004 and 2008

==== Netball ====
- Tiana Metuarau (2018) – Silver Fern
- Jean Mitchell (1930) – Silver Fern

=== Other fields ===
- Cathy Penney – Pilot
- Janet Hesketh – women's rights activist

== Notable staff ==
- Saradha Koirala – poet and writer
