= Jan Pouwer =

Dutch anthropologist (1924–2010)

Jan Pouwer (21 September 1924, Dordrecht – 21 April 2010, Zwolle) was a Dutch anthropologist with a thorough grounding in his profession in terms of fieldwork and theory. He studied Indology and Ethnology at Leiden University (MA 1950, PhD 1955) under the renowned Jan Petrus Benjamin de Josselin de Jong. He worked as a ‘government anthropologist’ and conducted extensive fieldwork in Netherlands New Guinea (now Papua region in Indonesia), 1951–62. He subsequently served as Professor of Anthropology at Amsterdam, Wellington (N.Z./Aotearoa) and Nijmegen Universities, 1962–87.

Many of his concerns and much of his work can be viewed as a 'text' framed within the 'context' of Leiden Structuralism, itself part of the larger field of modern anthropology. He enriched this field with insights in configurational comparison and the dialectical character of social structure, mythology, gender and ritual. A dedicated teacher, Pouwer's ideas are not to be found in a single volume. They exist, like some forms of mythology, in several outlines and sketches. Over the course of his career, Pouwer published two books (one his 1955 PhD thesis) and a wide range of articles. His last book, Gender, Ritual and Social Formation in West Papua: A Configurational Analysis Comparing Kamoro and Asmat, was published at Leiden in 2010. It can be downloaded from OAPEN for no cost.

== Career ==
Pouwer studied Indology and Ethnology at Leiden University (first degree July 1, 1947; second degree November 14, 1950), a study leading to an academic degree for the Netherlands Indies Public Administration that included: Malayan and Javanese languages, Comparative Ethnology of the Netherlands Indies, Islamic Institutions, Overseas History, Constitutional and Customary Law, Western and Non-Western Economics, Cultural Anthropology. He worked briefly as a lecturer at Utrecht University (1951), then took off on a career as a ‘government anthropologist’ in Netherlands New Guinea, 1951–62.

He obtained his PhD on anthropological fieldwork among the Mimika in the Netherlands New Guinea at Leiden in 1955. He was a research officer (gouvernmentsethnoloog) at the Bureau for Native Affairs (Kantoor voor Bevolkingszaken) in Hollandia (now Jayapura), Netherlands New Guinea, 1951–60; served as Acting Advisor for Native Affairs in 1960–1961, as Advisor for Native Affairs in 1962.

He conducted fieldwork among the Kamoro people in the coastal Mimika-area (South-West New Guinea), 1951–54; undertook a two-months’ survey on social structure, land-tenure, prestige economy and some moot problems of acculturation in the areas surrounding the Ajamaru lakes, Central Bird's Head, West New Guinea, 1956; six months of research into the effects of commercial films on the ideas, values and behavior of urban Papuans, 1956; four months of fieldwork in the rugged highlands of the Northwestern Bird's Head (Anggi lakes and surroundings), mainly among two highly dispersed tribes, 1957; eight months of fieldwork as a member of the Dutch scientific expedition to the Star Mountains (Sterrengebergte) near the border between West New Guinea and Papua, 1959; the Iwur region, south of the Star Mountains; the urban community of Tugunese people (1961), a mixture of Indonesian, Portuguese, Dutch, German and Papuan origin, who left their village near Jakarta in 1950 to settle in Hollandia (now Jayapura) and who were expected to migrate to the Netherlands in 1962.

His 1955 PhD thesis at Leiden, Enkele aspecten van de Mimika-cultuur, Nederlands Zuidwest Nieuw Guinea (Some aspects of Mimika Culture, Netherlands South-West New Guinea), was based on twenty-five months of fieldwork among the Mimika (Kamoro) people. Pouwer makes frequent reference to it in many of his published papers. In the Prologue to his 2010 book, he notes (2010:3) that a request to have the thesis translated into English was unsuccessful and that this reduced access for those with a limited reading knowledge of Dutch.

Shortly before his death, Pouwer concluded a synthetic monograph comparing Kamoro and Asmat culture, based on his own fieldwork, missionary and administrative reports, and anthropological studies (Gender, Ritual and Social Formation in West Papua. Leiden, 2010). In this work Pouwer makes use of a distinction between the symbolic and existential dimensions of social action as refined by Bruce Knauft (1993) while, at the same time and contra Knauft, using a configurational approach to demonstrate the difference between the neighbouring Kamoro and Asmat peoples.

As part of his official duties Pouwer taught general anthropology and ethnography of New Guinea at the School of Public Administration (Bestuursschool) in Hollandia, Netherlands New Guinea, 1955–58. He was Full Professor of Cultural Anthropology, Faculty of Social and Political Sciences, University of Amsterdam, The Netherlands, 1962–66; Foundation Professor and Head of the Department of Anthropology and Maori Studies, Victoria University of Wellington, New Zealand, 1966–76; and Senior Lecturer, Department of Cultural and Social Anthropology, Catholic University of Nijmegen, The Netherlands, 1976–87. He was a visiting professor at Monash University (Australia) in 1971 and at the Universities of Toronto (Canada), Leiden and Utrecht (the Netherlands) in 1972.

Notable doctoral students of Pouwer include emeritus Chief Researcher of the New Zealand Council for Educational Research, Cathy Wylie.

== Selected bibliography ==
- Brief dd. 6 December 1953 aan het Hoofd van het Kantoor voor Bevolkingszaken te Hollandia, betreffende: de benutting der tweedeling voor de ontwikkeling van der Mimika, Archives Bureau of Native Affairs No. 508, The Hague.
- Enkele aspecten van de Mimika-cultuur (Nederlands Zuidwest Nieuw Guinea). Proefschrift Rijksuniversiteit Leiden, 26 October 1955 (supervisor J.P.B. de Josselin de Jong). 's-Gravenhage: Staatsdrukkerij- en Uitgeversbedrijf. xii + 323 pp., maps, fig. English summary, 9 pp. 1955
- A Masquerade in Mimika. Antiquity and Survival 1(5):373-386 1956
- 'Loosely' Structured Societies in Netherlands New Guinea. Bijdragen tot de Taal-, Land-en Volkenkunde, 116, 109-118. 1960
- New Guinea as a Field for Ethnological Study: A Preliminary Analysis. Bijdragen tot de Taal-, Land- en Volkenkinde 117 (1961), No: 1, Leiden, 1-24
- A Social System in the Star Mountains: Towards a Reorientation of Study of Social Systems.American Anthropologist LXI No 4 133-162 (Special publication). 1964
- Radcliffe-Brown's Ideas on Joking Relationships Tested by Data from Mimika. International Archives of Ethnography 1:11-30 1964
- Towards a Configurational Approach to Society and Culture in New Guinea. Journal of the Polynesian Society 75-3:267-86 1966
- Toward a Configurational Approach to Society and Culture in New Guinea. Behavioral Science Research in New Guinea: a report of a conference. Honolulu, Hawaii August 18–25, 1965 Publication 1493 National Research Council Academy of Sciences Washington D.C 1967:77-100 (This is an earlier version of the preceding and is available via Google books.)
- Translation at Sight: The Job of a Social Anthropologist. Inaugural Address, The Victoria University of Wellington (New Zealand-Aotearoa) 1 August 1968.
- Mimika Land Tenure New Guinea Research Bulletin 38:24-33 Canberra: Australian National University 1970
- Signification and Fieldwork. Journal of Symbolic Anthropology 1:1-13 1973 (based on Translation at sight)
- The Structural Configurational Approach: A Methodological Outline. in: Rossi 1974:238-255
- Structural History: A New Guinea Case Study. in W.E.A. van Beek and J.H. Scherer (eds) 1975:80-111
- The Anthropologist as the Trickster's Apprentice: Complementarity Ambivalence and Dialectic. Typescript n.d.(c 1979?)
- The Enigma of the Unfinished Male: An Entry to East Bird's Head Mythology, Irian Jaya Anthropos (Journal) 94:457-486.
- Geslachtelijheid en ideologie: toegelicht aan een samenleving van Irian Jaya in T. Lemaire (ed.) 1984
- Cargo Cult as Countervailing Ideology. Bijdragen tot de Taal-, Land- en Volkenkunde 144:523-539 1988
- The Leiden Structuralist Tradition: A "French Connection"? Antropologische Verkenningen 8:21-34. 1989
- The Individual Re-visited. In: Borsboom, et al 1989:291-307
- The Willed and the Wild: The Kalam Cassowary Revisited. In Man and a Half: Essays in Pacific Anthropology and Ethnobiology in Honour of Ralph Bulmer. A. Pawley (ed). Auckland: Polynesian Society. No. 48:305-316. 1991
- Mimika in Terence E. Hays (ed.) 1991:209
- The Hidden Flow (review of James Weiner, The Heart of the pearl shell: The mythological dimension of Foi sociology. 1988 Uni of California Press) Bijdragen tot de Taal-, Land- en Volkenkinde 147:502-508 1991
- Fizzy: Fuzzy; FAS? A Review of Leiden Labour. Canberra Anthropology 15(1) 1992:87-105
- The colonisation, decolonisation and recolonisation of West New Guinea. Journal of Pacific History Vol. 34, No. 2:157-79 1999
- We-Humans' Betwixt and Between: A Guide to the Stories in G.A.M Offenberg and Jan Pouwer 2002
- Kamoro life and ritual. in D. Smidt (ed.) 2003:24-57
- Gender, Ritual and Social Formation in West Papua: A Configurational Analysis Comparing Kamoro and Asmat. Leiden: KITLV Press (KITLV, Verhandelingen 258). xiii + 300 pp. ill. maps. 2010.

== Reference bibliography ==
- Beek, W.E.A. van and Scherer, J.H. (eds) Explorations in the Anthropology of Religion: Essays in Honour of Jan van Baal. The Hague: Nijhoff (KITLV, Verhandelingen 74). 1975
- Borsboom, A.; Kommers, J.; Remie, C. (eds) Liber amicorum A.A. Trouwborst: Antropologische essays. Nijmegen: Katholieke Universiteit Nijmegen, Instituut voor Culturele en Sociale Antropologie; 1989 Sociaal Antropologische Cahiers; v. XXIII
- Grijp, Paul van der, Ton Lemaire en Albert Trouwborst (eds) Sporen in de antropologie: Liber Amicorum Jan Pouwer. Nijmegen: Katholieke Universiteit Nijmegen, Instituut voor Kulturele en Sociale Antropologie 1987, 330 pp.
- Hays, Terence E. Encyclopedia of World Cultures, Volume 2:Oceania Boston:Hall
- Haenen, Paul and Pouwer, Jan (eds) Peoples on the Move: Current Themes of Anthropological Research in New Guinea. Nijmegen: Centre for Australian and Oceanic Studies, University of Nijmegen 1989
- Kooijman, Simon, Jan Pouwer en de ‘Leidse’ Mimika collectie. In: Paul van der Grijp et al 1987, pp. 107–118.
- Knauft, Bruce M. South Coast New Guinea Cultures: History, Comparison, Dialectic. Cambridge: Cambridge University Press. 1993
- Lemaire, T (ed.) Anthropologie en ideologie. Groningen: Konstapel 1984
- Offenberg, Gertrudis A.M and Pouwer, Jan (eds) Amoko in the Beginning: Myths and Legends of the Asmat and Mimika Papuans. Adelaide: Crawford House Publishing (Australia) 2002
- Oosten, Jarich "A Privileged Field of Study:" Marcel Mauss and Structural Anthropology in Leiden. Etudes/Inuit/Studies, 2006, 30(2):51-71
- Ploeg, Anton Pouwer's Field Research in the Star Mountains, West New Guinea Oceania, Vol. 83, Issue 1 (2013): 49–56
- Rossi, Ino (ed) The Unconscious in Culture: The Structuralism of Claude Lévi-Strauss in Perspective. New York: Dutton, 1974
- Schefold, Reimar. Cultural Anthropology, Future Tasks for Bijdragen, and the Indonesian Field of Anthropological study. Bijdragen tot de Taal-, Land- en Volkenkunde, 150 Volumes of Bijdragen: A Backward Glance and a Forward Glimpse 150(4):805-825. 1994
- Smidt, D (ed) Kamoro Art: Tradition and Innovation in a New Guinea Culture. KIT, Amsterdam, Rijksmuseum voor Volkenkunde, Leiden 2003

== See also ==
- Kamoro language
