= Jack Shallcrass =

New Zealand author, educator and humanist

Jack Shallcrass CBE
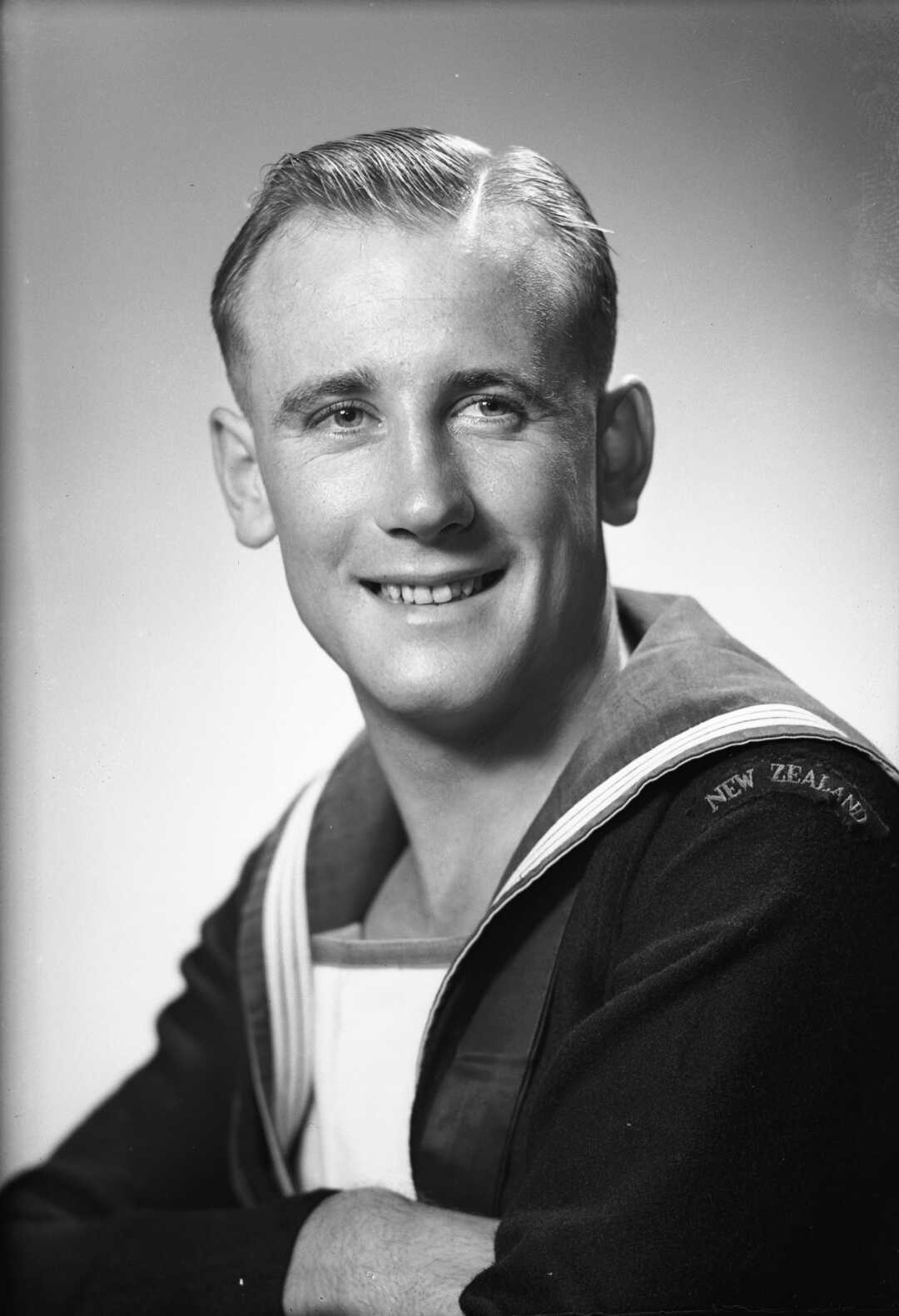
- Shallcrass, c. 1947
- Born: John James Shallcrass; 11 September 1922; Takapuna, New Zealand
- Died: 13 August 2014 (aged 91); Wellington, New Zealand

John James Shallcrass CBE (11 September 1922 – 13 August 2014) was a New Zealand author, educator and humanist.

== Biography ==
Born in Takapuna in 1922, Shallcrass was educated at Wellington College, and served in the Pacific during World War II. He later studied at Victoria University College, from where he graduated with a Diploma of Education in 1952, a Bachelor of Arts in 1959 and Master of Arts in 1961.

In an educational career spanning more than 50 years, he taught in New Zealand schools, at Wellington Teachers' College and Victoria University, rising to the rank of associate professor. In the 1991 New Year Honours, he was appointed a Commander of the Order of the British Empire, for services to education. A devout humanist, he was named "Humanist of the Year" by the Humanist Society in 1994.

He died in Wellington in 2014.
