= Carmen Dalli =

New Zealand early childhood education academic

Carmen Dalli MNZM
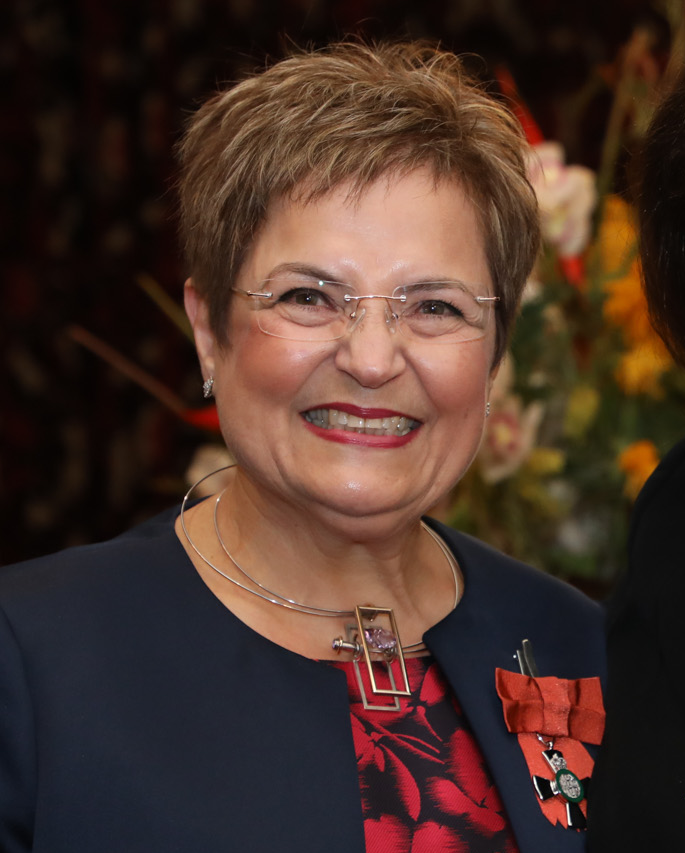
- Dalli in 2025
- Born: 1959 (age 66–67)
- Education: Victoria University of Wellington
- Scientific career
- Thesis: Starting Childcare Before Three: Narratives of Experience From a Tri-Partite Focus (1999)
- Doctoral advisor: Lise Bird; Anne Mead
- Doctoral students: Marie Bell; Linda Mitchell

Maria Carmela "Carmen" Dalli MNZM (born 1959) is a New Zealand education academic specialising in early childhood education. In December 2024, Dalli was appointed a Member of the New Zealand Order of Merit, for services to education.

Dalli has a BA (Hons) from the University of Malta, a MEd from the University of Bristol and a PhD from Victoria University of Wellington She is currently a professor in the School of Education at Victoria University of Wellington.

Professor Dalli is chair of an independent ministerial advisory group set up to advise the Government of New Zealand on the development of its 10 Year Early Learning Strategic Plan.

Dalli is honorary consul for Malta in Wellington.
