= Te Whāriki =

New Zealand Early Education curriculum

Te Whāriki, or Te Whāriki He whāriki mātauranga mō ngā mokopuna o Aotearoa, is New Zealand's early years curriculum guideline. It is published by Ministry of Education, and has been recognised worldwide for its approach to early learning. The word Te Whāriki means 'woven mat' in Māori.

== History ==
Following the New Zealand government's introduction of a Curriculum Framework in 1990, they began developing an early childhood curriculum. A draft was released to early childhood centres in 1993, and Te Whāriki was published in 1996 as a bi-cultural curriculum following consultation with teachers. Schools were not sent copies of the 1996 publication, which some felt led to disconnect between the early childhood and school curriculums.

The publication was met with interest outside of New Zealand, with educators in Australia, Germany, Denmark, and Norway reviewing it while developing their own early childhood curriculum.

It was also criticised following its publication, around a lack of research to back up its principles. An update was recommended in 2015, and in 2016 a team of writers began working on a revised edition.

A revised Te Whāriki was published in 2017 by the New Zealand Ministry of Education. Helen May, Tilly Reedy, Tamati Reedy, and Margaret Carr had each contributed as writers of the original publication and returned to advise the revision. The 2017 publication sought to make links between early childhood and school curriculums more explicit, but upon its release it was criticised for a lack of consultation with the education sector and for changes in teaching methods.

For the 2017 edition, the Maori and English versions of Te Whāriki were separated into Te Whāriki: He whāriki mātauranga mō ngā mokopuna o Aotearoa and Te Whāriki a te Kōhanga Reo, with the later being the curriculum for children in Kōhanga reo. Both were included together in one publication.

== Content ==
Te Whāriki is a bi-cultural curriculum that sets out four broad principles, a set of five strands, and goals for each strand. It does not prescribe specific subject-based lessons, rather it provides a framework for teachers and early childhood staff (kaiako) to encourage and enable children in developing the knowledge, skills, attitudes, learning dispositions to learn how to learn.

The five strands of Te Whāriki are presented with dual English and Māori names. But due to different cultural connotations, the two names are not equivalents.

The five strands are:

- Wellbeing – Mana atua
- Belonging – Mana whenua
- Contribution – Mana tangata
- Communication – Mana reo
- Exploration – Mana aotūroa
