= Cathy Wylie =

New Zealand education researcher

Cathy Wylie MNZM
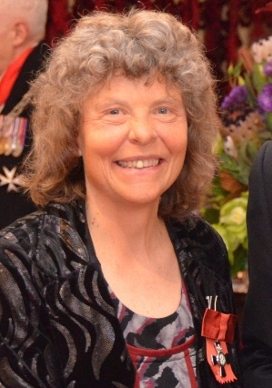
- Wylie at her investiture in March 2014
- Relatives: Ann Wylie (aunt)
- Awards: Herbison Lecture, McKenzie Award

Academic background
- Education: Victoria University of Wellington
- Thesis: Reflective Surfaces: the Individual as the Key Social Relationship in New Zealand Society (1980)
- Doctoral advisor: Jan Pouwer

Catherine Ruth Wylie MNZM is a New Zealand academic, and is Emeritus Chief Research at the New Zealand Council for Educational Research, specialising in the impacts of educational policy.

== Academic career ==
Wylie completed a PhD titled Reflective Surfaces: the Individual as the Key Social Relationship in New Zealand Society at Victoria University of Wellington in 1980. Wylie joined NZCER in 1987. From 1989, she led the National School Surveys. She also conducted a longitudinal study called Competent Learners, which tracked a group of students from the end of their early childhood education through to age 26. The research findings influenced both educational policy and practice. Wylie also led the development of the Teaching and School Practices survey tool, a research-based tool for schools.

Wylie's 2012 book Vital connections was critical of the impact of the Tomorrow's Schools reforms, and recommended changes to the competitive self-managed schools model to create better connections between schools and create more equal opportunities for learners. Wylie has also advocated for a single agency to take on some of the roles of the Ministry of Education, the Education Review Office, and the New Zealand Qualifications Authority.

Wylie was appointed as part of the five-person review panel for Tomorrow's Schools, which produced a 2018 report.

== Honours and awards ==
In the 2014 New Year Honours, Wylie was appointed a Member of the New Zealand Order of Merit, for services to education.

She received the New Zealand Association of Educational Research's McKenzie Award in 2010.

== Selected works ==
- Christensen, Sandy; Reschly, Amy; Wylie, Cathy, eds. (2012). Handbook of Research on Student Engagement. Springer. ISBN 978-1-4614-6791-5.
- Wylie, Cathy; Smith, Lesley (1995). Learning To Learn: Children's Progress through the First 3 Years of School. Junior School Study (Report). Ministry of Education. ISBN 0-908916-36-1.
- Lauder, Hugh; Wylie, Cathy, eds. (1990). Towards Successful Schooling. London: Routledge. doi:10.4324/9780203128572. ISBN 978-1-136-47000-4.
- Wylie, Cathy (2012). Vital connections: Why we need more than self-managing schools. NZCER. ISBN 978-1-927151-57-0.
- Wylie, Cathy (August 2000). Wylie Review of Special Education 2000: Picking up the pieces (Report). New Zealand Ministry of Education.
- "Cathy Wylie: Making more of our education strengths". NZ Herald. 14 August 2014.
- Wylie, Cathy (24 February 2020). ""It ain't what you do, it's the way you do it." Well, both"". School News.
