= Margaret Carr =

New Zealand early childhood education academic

Margaret Carr ONZM FRSNZ
- Born: 1941 (age 84–85)
- Education: University of Waikato
- Scientific career
- Fields: Early childhood education
- Workplaces: University of Waikato
- Thesis: Technological practice in early childhood as a dispositional milieu (1997)

Margaret Ann Carr ONZM FRSNZ (born 1941) is a New Zealand education academic. She is currently emerita professor at the University of Waikato.

== Academic career ==
After an undergraduate at the University of Waikato and Victoria University of Wellington, Carr completed a 1997 PhD titled Technological practice in early childhood as a dispositional milieu at Waikato.

Carr has research expertise in narrative assessment and early childhood education. Along with Helen May, she was a primary author of Te Whāriki, the first national New Zealand early childhood curriculum., and learning stories.

In the 2002 New Year Honours, Carr was appointed an Officer of the New Zealand Order of Merit, for services to early childhood education. She was appointed emerita professor at the University of Waikato in April 2018. In 2022 she was elected a Fellow of the Royal Society Te Apārangi.

== Selected works ==
- Carr, Margaret (2001). Assessment in early childhood settings: learning stories. Sage.
- Carr, Margaret; Claxton, Guy (2002). "Tracking the development of learning dispositions". Assessment in Education: Principles, Policy & Practice. 9 (1): 9–37.
- Claxton, Guy; Carr, Margaret (2004). "A framework for teaching learning: the dynamics of disposition". Early Years. 24 (1): 87–97.
- Carr, Margaret; Lee, Wendy (2012). Learning stories: constructing learner identities in early education. Sage.
- Margaret Carr; Sally Peters; Davis, Keryn; White, Jocelyn (2013). Key Competencies, Assessment and Learning Stories | New Zealand Council for Educational Research. New Zealand Council for Educational Research. ISBN 978-1-927151-89-1. Wikidata Q124607402.
