= Alex Gunn =

New Zealand professor of education

Alexandra Gunn
- Awards: Herbison Lecture

Academic background
- Education: University of Canterbury, University of Waikato
- Theses: Visual art education in early childhood centres : teachers' beliefs and practices (1998); Heteronormativity and early childhood education: Social justice and some puzzling queries (2008)
- Doctoral advisor: Margaret Carr, Sue Middleton
- Other advisors: Baljit Kaur, Alison Gilmore

Academic work
- Institutions: University of Otago

Alexandra Claire Gunn is a New Zealand academic, and is a full professor at the University of Otago, specialising in early childhood education, inclusive education, teacher education and educational assessment.

== Academic career ==
Gunn worked as an early childhood educator in both urban and rural not-for-profit childcare. Gunn completed a Master of Arts thesis Visual art education in early childhood centres : teachers' beliefs and practices at the University of Canterbury and a PhD titled Heteronormativity and early childhood education: Social justice and some puzzling queries at the University of Waikato. Gunn then joined the faculty of the University of Canterbury, before moving to the University of Otago in 2011. She was promoted to associate professor in 2018 and full professor in 2022. Gun was the Associate Dean (Teacher Education) for six years.

Gunn's research focuses on how the beliefs and values of teachers can affect their teaching practice, and how those beliefs interact with institutionalised discourse. Gunn is interested in inclusive education, and how normative thinking, around topics such as heterosexuality and gender diversity, for example, can cause issues in education. She is also interested in educational assessment, particularly narrative assessment, evidence-based teacher education and the decolonising of education.

With Joce Nuttall of the Australian Catholic University, Gunn co-edited the third edition of Weaving te Whāriki: Aotearoa New Zealand’s early childhood curriculum document in theory and practice.

== Honours and awards ==
In 2022 Gunn was awarded a TEFANZ (Teacher Education Forum of Aotearoa New Zealand) Sustained Excellence in Teacher Education Award. The award nomination said "She has been tireless in promoting social justice and equity in education and society in general for the marginalized, the underserved, the excluded, and those who are small and often not properly heard".

Gunn was invited to present the Herbison Lecture at the 2023 New Zealand Association for Research in Education conference.

== Selected works ==
- Purdue, Kerry; Gordon‐Burns, Diane; Gunn, Alexandra Claire; Madden, Barbara; Surtees, Nicola (2009). "Supporting inclusion in early childhood settings: some possibilities and problems for teacher education". International Journal of Inclusive Education. 13 (8): 805–815. doi:10.1080/13603110802110743. Wikidata Q124843409.
- Gunn, Alexandra Claire; Child, Coralanne; Madden, Barbara; Purdue, Kerry; Surtees, Nicola; Thurlow, Bronwyn; Todd, Paula (2004). "Building Inclusive Communities in Early Childhood Education: Diverse Perspectives from Aotearoa/New Zealand". Contemporary Issues in Early Childhood. 5 (3): 293–308. doi:10.2304/ciec.2004.5.3.4. Wikidata Q124852586.
- Surtees, Nicola; Gunn, Alexandra Claire (2010). "(Re)Marking Heteronormativity: Resisting Practices in Early Childhood Education Contexts". Australian Journal of Early Childhood. 35 (1): 42–47. doi:10.1177/183693911003500107. Wikidata Q124852589.
- Gunn, Alexandra Claire (2011). "Even if you say it three ways, it still doesn't mean it's true: The pervasiveness of heteronormativity in early childhood education". Journal of Early Childhood Research. 9 (3): 280–290. doi:10.1177/1476718x11398567. Wikidata Q124852590.
- Reese, Elaine; Gunn, Alexandra Claire; Bateman, Amanda; Carr, Margaret Ann (2019). "Teacher-child talk about learning stories in New Zealand: a strategy for eliciting children's complex language". Early Years: 1–16. doi:10.1080/09575146.2019.1621804. Wikidata Q109679913.
- Gunn, Alexandra Claire; Berg, David; Hill, Mary; Haigh, Mavis (2015). "Constructing the academic category of teacher educator in universities' recruitment processes in Aotearoa, New Zealand". Journal of Education for Teaching. 41 (3): 307–320. doi:10.1080/02607476.2015.1041288. Wikidata Q109679905.
- Gunn, Alexandra C.; Nuttall, Joce, eds. (2019). Weaving te Whāriki: Aotearoa New Zealand's early childhood curriculum document in theory and practice (3rd ed.) (3rd ed.). NZCER. ISBN 978-1-98-854280-5.
