= Jean Herbison =

New Zealand academic

Dame Jean Marjory Herbison DBE CMG (29 April 1923 – 20 May 2007) was a New Zealand academic, educator, researcher and Chancellor of the University of Canterbury. She was the first woman to hold the post of chancellor at a New Zealand university.

== Biography ==
Herbison was born in Dunedin in 1923, and attended Southland Girls' High School. She earned a BA from the University of Canterbury, a Diploma of Teaching from Auckland Teachers College, and an MA from the University of Northern Iowa. She was an Associate of the University of London Institute of Education. She has held a Fulbright Scholarship and an Imperial Relations Trust Fellowship.

She taught at Avonside Girls' High School from 1952 to 1959, and in 1960 became Dean of Christchurch Teachers' College. From 1968 to 1974 she was Vice-Principal of the Teachers College and in 1975 became associate director of Christchurch Polytechnic, a position she held until her retirement in 1984. She was elected to the Council of the University of Canterbury in 1970 and was Chancellor of the university from 1979 to 1984.

Herbison was a Fellow of the Commonwealth Council for Educational Administration and the New Zealand Educational Administration and Leadership Society. She was an Honorary Fellow of the New Zealand Educational Institute (NZEI) and the New Zealand Institute of Management.

Herbison lived in retirement in Christchurch before her death in 2007.

== Honours and awards ==
In the 1976 Queen's Birthday Honours, Herbision was made a Companion of the Order of St Michael and St George, for services to education, and in 1977 she was awarded the Queen's Silver Jubilee Medal.

She was appointed a Dame Commander of the Order of the British Empire, for services to education, in the 1985 Queen's Birthday Honours. In 1987 she was awarded an Honorary Doctorate of Letters by the University of Canterbury.

== Jean Herbison Lecture ==
Since 1990 the Jean Herbison Lecture at the New Zealand Association for Research in Education honours Herbison.

- 2025 Georgina Stewart
- 2024 Nesta Devine
- 2023 Alex Gunn
- 2022 John O'Neill
- 2021 Melinda Webber
- 2020 no conference
- 2019 Sonja Lee MacFarlane
- 2018 Rae Siilata
- 2017 Leonie Pihama
- 2016 Helen May
- 2015 Joce Jesson
- 2014 Graham Hingangaroa Smith
- 2013 Martin Thrupp
- 2012 Peter Roberts
- 2011 Wally Penetito
- 2010 Stuart McNaughton
- 2009 Cathy Wylie
- 2008 Joy Cullen
- 2007 Keith Ballard
- 2006 Geraldine McDonald
- 2005 Noeline Alcorn
- 2004 Alison Jones
- 2003 Margaret Carr
- 2001 Graham Nuthall
- 2000 Margaret Maaka
- 1999 William Tunmer
- 1998 Linda Smith
- 1997 Marie Clay
- 1996 Arapera Royal Tangaere
- 1995 Ivan Snook
- 1994 Warwick Elley
- 1993 Geraldine McDonald
- 1992 Noeline Alcorn
- 1991 Anne Smith
- 1990 Anne Meade

Academic offices
Preceded by Brian Anderson	Chancellor of the University of Canterbury; 1979–1984	Succeeded by Charles Caldwell
