= Sue Middleton =

New Zealand life history academic

- Born: 1947 (age 78–79)
- Education: Waikato University
- Scientific career
- Fields: Life history
- Workplaces: Waikato University
- Thesis: Feminism and education in post-war New Zealand: a sociological analysis (1985)
- Doctoral students: Elizabeth McKinley; Katie Fitzpatrick

Sue Middleton (born 1947) is a retired New Zealand academic who spent her career at the University of Waikato focused on life histories. She retains an affiliation to the Wilf Malcolm Institute for Educational Research at the university.

== Career ==
After a 1979 MSc thesis, A phenomenological perspective for the classroom teacher and its application to the education of women at Victoria University of Wellington and a 1985 PhD dissertation Feminism and education in post-war New Zealand: a sociological analysis at University of Waikato, New Zealand, Middleton joined the faculty.

From 2000 to 2006 Middleton was director of the Centre for Research in Social Policy, based at Loughborough University in the UK.

In 2013, Middleton was awarded Emeritus Professor by the University of Waikato. She is affiliated with the Wilf Malcolm Institute for Education Research at the university. Middleton is credited for pioneering New Zealand's first studies centred around "women and education [sic] and education and sexuality."

In 2019, Middleton and Helen May co-edited For Women and Children: a tribute to Geraldine McDonald, a collection of writings in honour of the life and work of researcher Geraldine McDonald.

Notable students of Middleton include Elizabeth McKinley and Katie Fitzpatrick.

In 2023 Middleton spoke out in support of the rewriting of sexuality and relationship education guidelines for schools. In 2026 Middleton was interviewed on Reality Check Radio to explain why she supported the Definitions of Woman and Man Amendment Bill. She also published an article on the subject in the Waikato Times, claiming that women's access to single-sex spaces was under threat without legal definitions relating to biological sex.

== Selected works ==
- Middleton, Sue. Questioning the gender bender agenda. 21 Jun 2021, Ipu Kereru (Blog of the New Zealand Association for Research in Education)
- Middleton, Sue. Educating feminists: Life histories and pedagogy. Teachers College Press, 1234 Amsterdam Avenue, New York, NY 10027., 1993.
- Middleton, Sue. "Disciplining sexuality: Foucault, life histories, and education." (1998).
- Weiler, Kathleen, and Sue Middleton. "Telling women's lives: Narrative inquiries in the history of women's education." British Journal of Educational Studies 47, no. 3 (1999).
- Middleton, Sue. "Developing a radical pedagogy: Autobiography of a New Zealand sociologist of women’s education." In Studying teachers' lives, pp. 30-62. Routledge, 2013.
- Middleton, Sue. Henri Lefebvre and education: Space, history, theory. Routledge, 2013.
- Middleton, Sue, and Helen May. "Teachers Talk Teaching, 1915-1995 Early Childhood, Schools and Teachers' Colleges." (1997).
- Middleton, Sue, and Alison Jones, eds. Women and education in Aotearoa. Vol. 2. Auckland University Press, 1997.
- Middleton, Sue, John A. Codd, and Alison Jones, eds. New Zealand education policy today: Critical perspectives. Allen & Unwin, 1990.

== Awards ==
- Emeritus Professor, Faculty of Education, University of Waikato, February 2013.
- Two Visiting Fellowships, Dept of Education Foundations & Policy Studies, London Institute of Education: October–December 2009; November 2010.
- NZARE McKenzie Award for Educational Research, (a lifetime achievement award), New Zealand Association for Research in Education, 2003.
- American Educational Studies Association Critics’ Choice Award for book: Middleton, S. (1993) Educating feminists: Life-histories and pedagogy. New York: Teachers’ College Press, University of Columbia.
- Fulbright-Hayes Travel Award (Senior Scholar) to visit US universities and to do research on 'the sociology of women's education', 1991.
