= Donna Campbell (artist) =

New Zealand textile artist, weaver, lecturer and curator

- Occupations: University teacher, curator, weaver and textile artist
- Known for: weaving and artworks

Academic background
- Education: University of Waikato
- Thesis: Ngā kura a Hineteiwaiwa: The embodiment of Mana Wahine in Māori fibre Arts (2019)
- Doctoral advisor: Leonie Pihama, Robert Jahnke

Donna Campbell (born 1959) is a New Zealand Māori university teacher, curator, weaver and textile artist. She affiliates with Ngāpuhi and Ngāti Ruanui iwi. Her works are held in the Museum of New Zealand Te Papa Tongarewa and in the British Museum. In 2019 Campbell completed a PhD at the University of Waikato with a thesis titled Ngā kura a Hineteiwaiwa: The embodiment of Mana Wahine in Māori fibre Arts.

The British Museum holds a kete whakairo made by Campbell in 1993. It is made of plaited flax strips 3–5 mm wide, dyed red and black, in a vertical twill pattern, with braided handles of black-dyed muka.

Along with showing her work in numerous exhibitions, Campbell has also curated exhibitions of weaving and textile artworks. She is currently an associate professor at the University of Waikato. She is the co-leader (along with Dr Catherine Smith and Rānui Ngārimu) of a team undertaking a kaupapa Māori research project, funded by a Marsden grant. The team (which includes Jeanette Wikaira and Hokimate Harwood) are researching Te Rā, the last known Māori sail. The sail is currently held at the British Museum.

== Select exhibitions ==
- Ngahuru Hei Mahia Tō Tātou Ao / Thread The Past So That The Younger Generation Can Progress, The Poi Room, 17 July 2020 - 31 July 2020.
- Ka Hikina: Navigating the Present, Waikato Museum, 14 June 2019 - 15 July 2019.
- Whenua Ora / Upon the Land, Waikato Museum, 29 August 2015 - 25 April 2016.
- Call of Taranaki: Reo Karanga o Taranaki, Puke Ariki, 2013.
- The Reclaimed Kete Series - By Donna Campbell, Waikato Museum, 25 November - 16 December 2006.
- The Eternal Thread, Te Aho Mutunga Kore, Yerba Buena Center for the Arts 2005, Cult Couture 2005 and Telstra Clear Pacific Event Centre 2006.
