= Janice Wearmouth =

British professor of education

Academic background
- Education: University of London, The Open University, Newcastle University
- Thesis: Exploring the 'problem space' in special educational provision in mainstream schools (2002)

Janice Barbara Wearmouth is a British education academic and author, and is a full professor at the University of Bedfordshire, specialising in special educational needs in schools. She was previously Professor of Education at Victoria University of Wellington in New Zealand.

== Academic career ==
Wearmouth studied Latin with Greek and Ancient History at the University of London, and the psychology of education at the Open University, and English and social studies at Newcastle University. She later earned a Master of Psychology and Education at London, and completed a PhD titled Exploring the 'problem space' in special educational provision in mainstream schools at the Open University. Wearmouth worked as a teacher, a special educational needs co-ordinator and Head of Education Support before moving into academia. Wearmouth was the Director of the Centre for Curriculum and Teaching Studies at the Open University, and then Professor of Education at Victoria University of Wellington in New Zealand. As of 2024 she is Professor of Education at the University of Bedfordshire, and co-director of the Institute for Research in Education, with Professor Uvanney Maylor. While at Bedfordshire she has co-designed a new undergraduate degree on special educational needs and disability for teachers, which was launched in 2022.

Wearmouth has written and edited a large number of books on education, including a critical introduction to special needs provision in schools, dyslexia and other special education challenges, and improving education for minority groups.

== Selected works ==
=== Books ===
- Wearmouth, Janice (17 June 2013). Special Educational Needs: The Basics. Routledge. doi:10.4324/9780203155189. ISBN 978-1-136-57989-9.
- Wearmouth, Janice (2009). A beginning teacher's guide to special educational needs. Maidenhead, England; New York: Open University Press.
- Wearmouth, Janice; Glynn, Ted; Richmond, Robin C.; Berryman, Mere (30 May 2004). Understanding pupil behaviour in school: a diversity of approaches. David Fulton Publishers. ISBN 9781843122302.
- Reid, Gavin; Wearmouth, Janice (2002). Dyslexia and literacy: theory and practice. Chichester, West Sussex, UK; New York: J. Wiley & Sons.
- Wearmouth, Janice; Goodwyn, Andrew, eds. (2019). Pupil, teacher and student voice in educational institutions: values, opinions, beliefs and perspectives. Abingdon, Oxon; New York, NY: Routledge.
- Wearmouth, Janice; Soler, Janet; Reid, Gavin. Meeting difficulties in literacy development: research, policy, and practice.

=== Journal articles ===
- Rix, Jonathan Robert MacGregor; Hall, Kathy; Nind, Melanie A.; Sheehy, Kieron; Wearmouth, Janice Barbara (2009). "What pedagogical approaches can effectively include children with special educational needs in mainstream classrooms? A systematic literature review". Support for Learning. 24 (2): 86–94. doi:10.1111/j.1467-9604.2009.01404.x. Wikidata Q57617163.
- Bishop, Russell; Berryman, Mere Anne; Wearmouth, Janice Barbara; Mira Peter; Sandra Clapham (2012). "Professional development, changes in teacher practice and improvements in Indigenous students' educational performance: A case study from New Zealand". Teaching and Teacher Education. 28 (5): 694–705. doi:10.1016/j.tate.2012.02.002. Wikidata Q113287071.
- Wearmouth, Janice Barbara; Soler, Janet (2001). "How inclusive is the Literacy Hour?". British Journal of Special Education. 28 (3): 113–119. doi:10.1111/1467-8527.00208. Wikidata Q130344862.
- Wearmouth, Janice Barbara; McKinney, Rawiri Neil; Glynn, Edward Lewis (2007). "Restorative justice in schools: a New Zealand example". Educational Research. 49 (1): 37–49. doi:10.1080/00131880701200740. Wikidata Q130344839.
- Berryman, Mere Anne; Wearmouth, Janice Barbara (2018). "Development of an Observation Tool Designed to Increase Cultural Relationships and Responsive Pedagogy to Raise the Achievement of Māori Students in Secondary Classrooms in Aotearoa New Zealand". Journal of Education and Development. 2 (2): 32. doi:10.20849/jed.v2i2.428. Wikidata Q130344837.
