= Katie Fitzpatrick =

Sociology and ethnography researcher

- Awards: Rutherford Discovery Fellowship, Sutton-Smith Doctoral Award

Academic background
- Education: University of Waikato
- Thesis: Stop playing up! A critical ethnography of health, physical education and (sub)urban schooling (2010)
- Doctoral advisor: Sue Middleton, Doug Booth

Katie Fitzpatrick is a New Zealand academic, and is a full professor at the University of Auckland, specialising in health education, education sociology and public health. Fitzpatrick was awarded a Rutherford Discovery Fellowship in 2014, a Beeby Fellowship in 2017, and the Catherine D. Ennis Outstanding Scholar Award in 2021.

== Academic career ==
Fitzpatrick qualified first as a teacher, and taught for seven years in secondary schools in South Auckland. She worked as a lecturer in the Sport and Leisure Studies Department at the University of Waikato. In 2010 Fitzpatrick completed a PhD titled Stop playing up! A critical ethnography of health, physical education and (sub)urban schooling at the University of Waikato. Fitzpatrick then joined the faculty of the University of Auckland, rising to full professor.

In 2014, whilst a senior lecturer at Auckland, Fitzpatrick was awarded a Rutherford Discovery Fellowship, for transdisciplinary research on youth health issues and how young people apply health knowledge. Fitzpatrick's research includes health and wellbeing, physical education, mental health and sexuality education, critical pedagogy and critical ethnography. Fitzpatrick led the writing of the Relationships and Sexuality education guidelines for the Ministry of Education, and co-led with Professor Melinda Webber the Ministry of Education policy on mental health education published in 2022, and accompanying teaching resources.

Fitzpatrick has published a number of books. Her first, Critical Pedagogy, Physical Education and Urban Schooling (2013, Peter Lang) won the North American Society for the Sociology of Sport Outstanding Book Prize in 2013.

In 2016, Fitzpatrick was awarded a Beeby Fellowship by the New Zealand Council for Educational Research, to produce a mental health teaching resource, and in 2021 the American Association of Research in Education awarded her the Catherine D. Ennis Outstanding Scholar Award.

== Selected works ==
=== Books ===
- Katie Fitzpatrick (2012) Critical pedagogy, physical education and urban schooling. Peter Lang. ISBN 9781433117411
- Katie Fitzpatrick and Stephen May (2022). Critical ethnography and education: Theory, methodology, and ethics. 199 pages. Routledge ISBN 9781138631960
- Esther Fitzpatrick and Katie Fitzpatrick, editors. (21 July 2020) Poetry, Method and Education Research: Doing Critical, Decolonising and Political Inquiry. 306 pages. Routledge. ISBN 9780429202117
- Deana Leahy, Katie Fitzpatrick, Jan Wright, editors. (30 Mar 2020) Social Theory and Health Education Forging New Insights in Research. 264 pages. Routledge

=== Journal articles ===
- McGlashan, Hayley; Fitzpatrick, Katie (2018). "'I use any pronouns, and I'm questioning everything else': transgender youth and the issue of gender pronouns". Sex Education. 18 (3): 239–252. doi:10.1080/14681811.2017.1419949. Wikidata Q126045601.
- Fitzpatrick, Katie; Dan Russell (2013). "On being critical in health and physical education". Physical Education and Sport Pedagogy. 20 (2): 159–173. doi:10.1080/17408989.2013.837436. Wikidata Q126045562.
- Powell, Darren; Fitzpatrick, Katie (2013). "'Getting fit basically just means, like, nonfat': children's lessons in fitness and fatness". Sport Education and Society. 20 (4): 463–484. doi:10.1080/13573322.2013.777661. Wikidata Q58155588.
- Dillon Landi; Fitzpatrick, Katie; McGlashan, Hayley (2016). "Models Based Practices in Physical Education: A Sociocritical Reflection". Journal of Teaching in Physical Education. 35 (4): 400–411. doi:10.1123/jtpe.2016-0117. Wikidata Q126045602.
