= Jenny Lee-Morgan =

Professor of Māori research in New Zealand

- Born: 1968
- Other names: Jennifer Bol June Lee; Jennifer Joy Lee
- Awards: Te Tohu Pae Tawhiti Award

Academic background
- Theses: He Hainamana toku mama, he Māori toku papa, ko wai ahau? : Maori-Chinese tell their stories : an exploration of identity (1996); Ako: Pūrākau of Māori teachers' work in secondary schools (2008)

Jenny Bol Jun Lee-Morgan (also Jennifer Joy Lee) is a New Zealand academic and sociologist. She is Professor of Māori Research, and was founding director of Unitec's Ngā Wai a Te Tūī Māori Research Centre.

== Early life and education ==
Lee-Morgan is Māori, and affiliates to Waikato Tainui, Ngāti Mahuta, and Ngāti Te Ahiwaru. Her father is Māori–Chinese and her mother is Chinese, and both were teachers. Lee-Morgan trained as a Māori teacher, and started the Māori unit at Northcote College, before leading the Kahurangi unit at Auckland Girls' Grammar School. She completed a Master of Arts in 1996, followed by a PhD titled Ako: Pūrākau of Māori teachers' work in secondary schools both at the University of Auckland.

== Career ==
Lee-Morgan then joined the faculty at Auckland, before moving to the University of Waikato, and rising to full professor. Lee-Morgan was the inaugural director of the Ngā Wai a Te Tūī Māori Research Centre at Unitec Institute of Technology, which was established in 2021.

Lee-Morgan's research focuses on Māori pedagogy. As part of the Building Better Homes, Towns and Cities National Science Challenge, Lee-Morgan and her research team ran the Te Manaaki o te Mārae project, which looked at how Te Puea Memorial Marae in Māngere was working with homeless people. In 2021 Lee-Morgan was awarded a Marsden grant with Dr Frances Hancock from The University of Auckland and Pūkenga Matua Carwyn Jones (Ngāti Kahungunu) of Te Wānanga o Raukawa, for a research project on protecting Ihumātao from commercial development. The research also involved Pania Newton, Moana Waa and Qiane Matata-Sipu. Lee-Morgan is also a researcher in the Ngā Pae o Te Māramatanga Centre of Research Excellence.

Lee-Morgan has written several books, including a book about the history of Māori–Chinese people in New Zealand, Jade Taniwha: Maori-Chinese Identity and Schooling in Aotearoa. Her 2016 book with Jessica Hutchings, Decolonisation in Aotearoa: education, research and practice, was awarded the prize in the non-fiction category of the Ngā Kupu Ora Aotearoa Māori Book Awards 2017.

== Honours and awards ==
In 2016, the New Zealand Association for Research in Education awarded Lee-Morgan the Te Tohu Pae Tawhiti Award for "her significant and high-quality research contribution to Māori education".

== Selected works ==
- Jenny Lee-Morgan; Jo Mane; Joanne Gallagher; Ruia Aperahama (25 November 2022), A Māori Modern Learning Environment: Ko te Akā Pūkaea Kia Ita, Ko te Akā Pūkaea Kia Eke!, doi:10.34074/proc.2205017, Wikidata Q126685003
- Jenny Lee-Morgan; Penetito, Kim; Ngahuia Eruera (25 November 2022), Marae Ora, Kāinga Ora: A Marae-Led Response to Covid-19, doi:10.34074/proc.2205013, Wikidata Q126685002
- Jenny Lee-Morgan; Penetito, Kim; Jo Mane; Ngahuia Eruera; Kaatewairua Evans; Luella Linaker; Baari Mio; Newton, Pania; Moana Waa; Hineamaru Ropati (2023). "Kāinga Tahi, Kāinga Rua: The Role of Marae in Reimagining Housing Māori in the Urban Environment". Genealogy. 7 (3): 47. doi:10.3390/genealogy7030047. Wikidata Q126685001.
- Pihama, Leonie Eileen; Jenny Lee-Morgan; Smith, Linda Tuhiwai Rina; Sarah Jane Tiakiwai; Joeliee Seed-Pihama (2019). "MAI Te Kupenga: Supporting Māori and Indigenous doctoral scholars within Higher Education". AlterNative. 15 (1): 52–61. doi:10.1177/1177180119828065. Wikidata Q122361727.
- Jenny Lee-Morgan; Rihi Te Nana (2022). "Stories from the Haukāinga: Embracing Homeless Whānau at Te Puea Memorial Marae". doi:10.7810/9781990046735_7. Wikidata Q126685026 http://dx.doi.org/10.7810/9781990046735_7.
- Jenny Lee-Morgan; Matthew Courtney; Maureen Muller (2018). "New Zealand Māori-medium teacher education: an examination of students' academic confidence and preparedness". Asia-Pacific Journal of Teacher Education. 47 (2): 137–151. doi:10.1080/1359866x.2018.1539214. Wikidata Q126685027.
- Jenny Lee-Morgan; Penetito, Kim; Jo Mane; Ngahuia Eruera (2021). "Marae Ora Kāinga Ora: Indigenous Health and Wellbeing Solutions via Time-Honored Indigenous Spaces". Genealogy. 5 (4): 99. doi:10.3390/genealogy5040099. Wikidata Q126685028.
- Jenny Lee-Morgan; Maureen Muller (2017). "On Stage Māori-Medium ITE: Listening to Students' Voices". The New Zealand Annual Review of Education. 22: 21–35. doi:10.26686/nzaroe.v22i0.4144. Wikidata Q126685030.
