= Arapera =

Arapera may refer to

== Place ==
- Frasertown, a small settlement in the northern Hawke's Bay

== People ==
- Arapera Blank (1932–2002), New Zealand poet, short-story writer and teacher
- Arapera Royal Tangaere (born 1950), New Zealand early childhood education leader and advocate for the Māori language
