= Wearmouth =

Wearmouth may refer to:

== Places ==
- Sunderland, Tyne and Wear, United Kingdom
  - Bishopwearmouth
  - Monkwearmouth
  - Monkwearmouth–Jarrow Abbey (the Monkwearmouth part)
  - Wearmouth Bridge
  - Wearmouth Colliery

== People ==
- Dick Wearmouth (1926–2012), Australian rules footballer
- Janice Wearmouth, British professor of education
- Jim Wearmouth (1909–1989), Australian rugby league player
- Joe Wearmouth (1878–1925), Australian rules football player
- Ronnie Wearmouth, Australian rules footballer
