= Noeline Alcorn =

New Zealand education research academic

Noeline Alcorn QSO
- Education: University of California, Irvine
- Scientific career
- Fields: Education research
- Institutions: Massey University
- Thesis: Vision and nightmare : a study of Doris Lessing's novels (1971)

Noeline Elizabeth Alcorn QSO is a New Zealand education-research academic, and as of 2019 is a full professor at the University of Waikato. In 1993, Alcorn was awarded the New Zealand Suffrage Centennial Medal. In 2005 she was appointed a Companion of the Queen's Service Order for public services.

== Academic career ==
After attending Samuel Marsden Collegiate School in Wellington, New Zealand and a 1971 PhD titled Vision and nightmare : a study of Doris Lessing's novels at the University of California, Irvine, Alcorn moved to the University of Waikato, rising to full professor.

== Honours and awards ==
In 1993, Alcorn was awarded the New Zealand Suffrage Centennial Medal. In the 2005 Queen's Birthday Honours, she was appointed a Companion of the Queen's Service Order for public services.

Alcorn was twice selected for the Herbison Lecture by the New Zealand Association for Research in Education, in 1992 and again in 2005.

== Selected works ==
- Alcorn, Noeline. To the fullest extent of his powers: CE Beeby's life in education. Victoria University Press, 1999.
- Locke, Terry, Noeline Alcorn, and John O’Neill. "Ethical issues in collaborative action research." Educational Action Research 21, no. 1 (2013): 107–123.
- Alcorn, Noeline. "Teacher education in New zealand 1974–2014." Journal of Education for Teaching 40, no. 5 (2014): 447–460.
- Alcorn, Noeline. "Knowledge through a collaborative network: a cross‐cultural partnership." Educational action research 18, no. 4 (2010): 453–466.
- Alcorn, Noeline, and Martin Thrupp. "Uncovering meanings: The discourses of New Zealand secondary teachers in context." New Zealand Journal of Educational Studies 47, no. 1 (2012): 107.
