= Jane Gilbert =

Jane Gilbert may refer to:

- Jane Gilbert (educationalist), New Zealand educationalist
- Jane Gilbert (actress) (1909–1985), American actress
