= Alison Jones =

New Zealand sociologist

Alison Jones MNZM
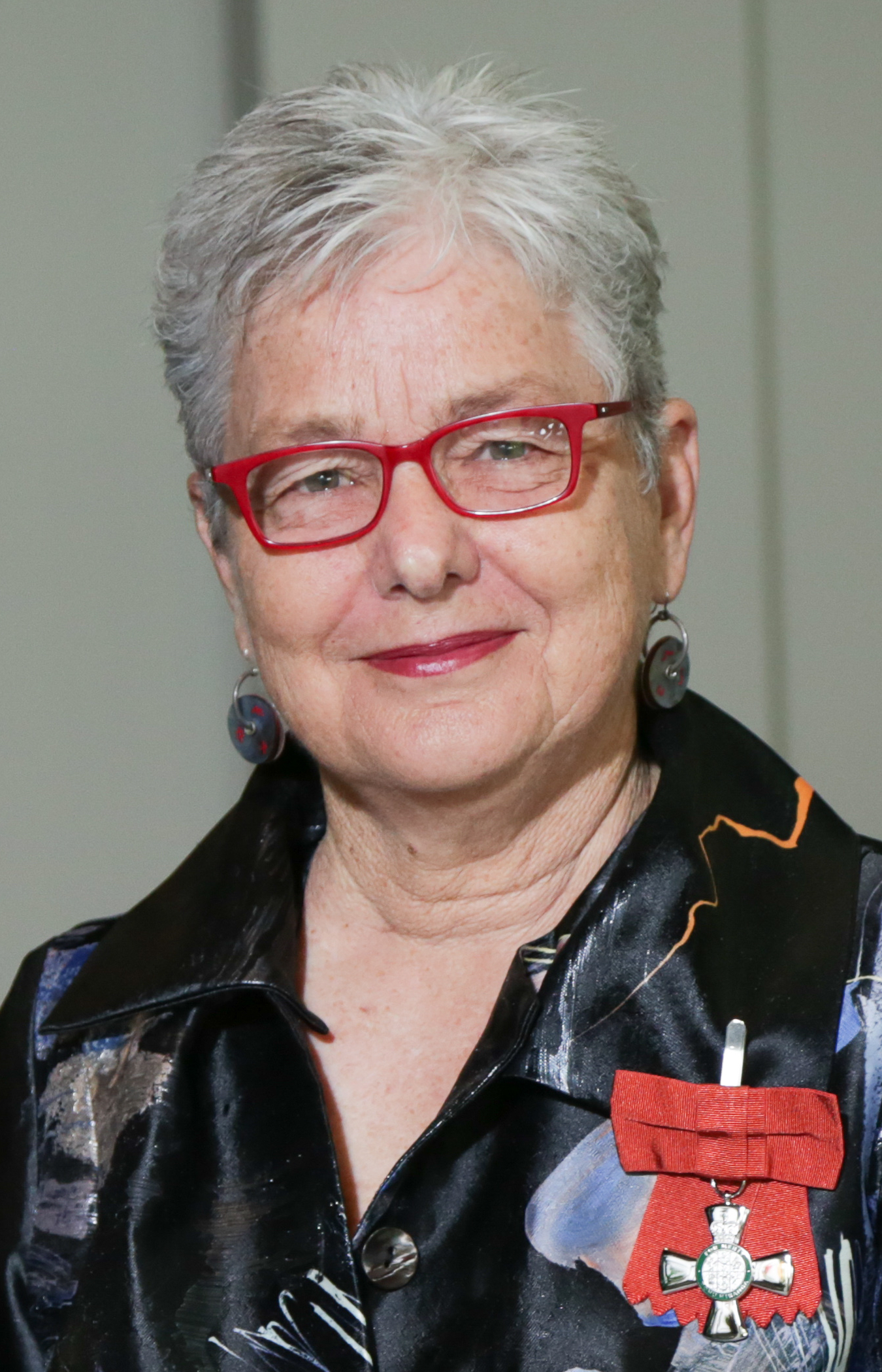
- Jones in 2019
- Education: University of Auckland
- Awards: Dame Joan Metge, 2014
- Scientific career
- Thesis: "At school I've got a chance...": social reproduction in a New Zealand secondary school (1986)

Barbara Alison Jones MNZM is a New Zealand academic who works in the field of sociology of education. She is the great-great-great granddaughter of Andrew Buchanan, New Zealand politician 1862–1874; great-great granddaughter of William Baldwin New Zealand politician 1863–1867; great granddaughter of Admiral William Oswald Story of the British Royal Navy. She has two sons, Finn McCahon Jones and Frey McCahon Jones

== Education and career ==
Jones studied at Auckland for her Doctor of Education, entitled "'At School I've Got a Chance...': social reproduction in a New Zealand secondary school".

In 2004, Jones was selected to give the Herbison Lecture by the New Zealand Association for Research in Education. In 2005, she was promoted to Professor in Te Puna Wānanga, School of Māori and Indigenous Education at the University of Auckland.

In 2014, she won the Dame Joan Metge medal. She was selected as one of the Royal Society Te Apārangi's 150 women in 150 words in 2017.

In the 2019 New Year Honours, Jones was appointed a Member of the New Zealand Order of Merit, for services to education and sociology research.

== Publications ==
Her books include 'At school I've Got a Chance': Pacific Islands and Pākehā girls at school (1991), He Kōrero: Words Between Us: First Māori Pākehā conversations on paper (2011), and Tuai: A Traveller in Two Worlds (2017) co-authored with Kuni Kaa Jenkins which won the 2018 Ockham New Zealand Book Award for Illustrated Non-Fiction. Her 2020 memoir, This Pākehā Life, was shortlisted for the 2021 Ockham New Zealand Book Award (General Nonfiction).

Jones' book, He Kōrero: Words Between Us: First Māori Pākehā conversations on paper (2011) was listed in Books of Mana as one of the 180 most significant works of Māori-authored non-fiction.
