= Rānui Ngārimu =

New Zealand author and weaver (born 1946)

Rānui Ngārimu ONZM
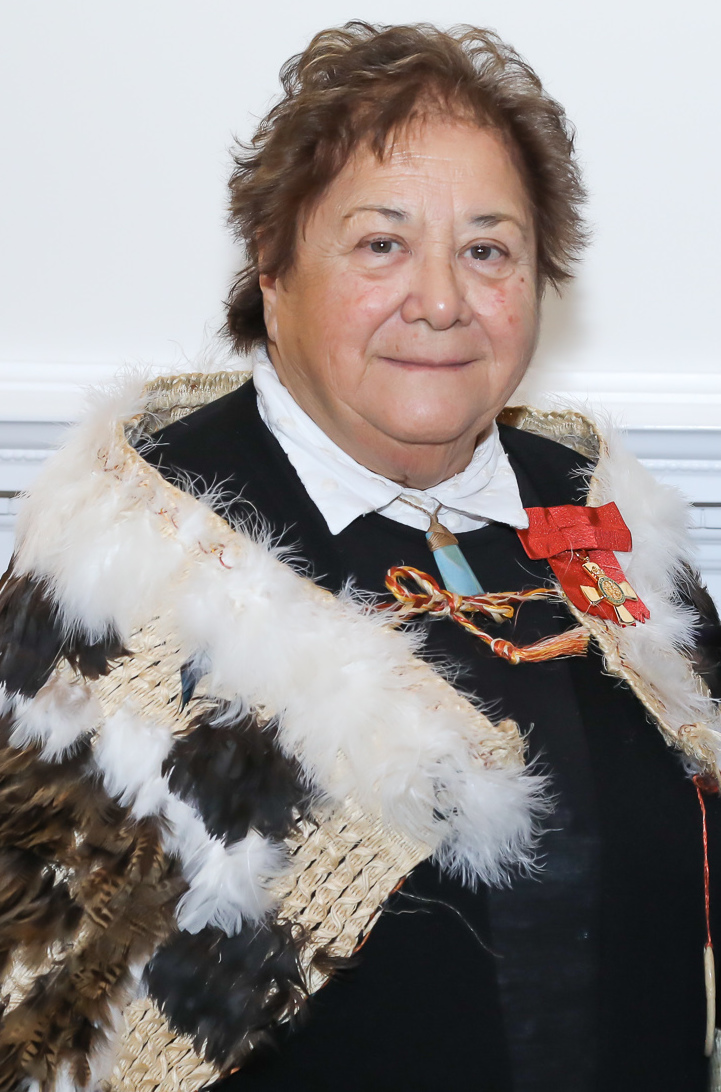
- Born: Rānui Phillips; 1946 (age 79–80); Christchurch, New Zealand
- Occupations: Weaver and textile artist
- Notable work: Te Māhutonga ('the Southern Cross'); Ngā Here o te Ao; The Art of Māori Weaving (book)
- Relatives: Miriama Evans (sister)
- Awards: Te Waka Toi Ngā Tohu ā Tā Kingi Ihaka

Rānui Ngārimu ONZM (née Phillips; born 1946) is a New Zealand Māori weaver and textile artist. She has chaired Te Roopu Raranga Whatu o Aotearoa, the national Māori weavers' collective, and is formally acknowledged as a master weaver by appointment to the collective's Kāhui Whiritoi group in 2008.

Ngārimu created the cloak, Te Māhutonga ('the Southern Cross'), worn by the flag bearer of the New Zealand Olympic team. She has also been an integral member of the team researching Te Rā, the last known Māori sail.

In the 2020 New Year Honours, Ngārimu was appointed an Officer of the New Zealand Order of Merit. She is heavily involved in supporting kapa haka and te reo Māori.

== Personal biography ==
Ngārimu was born in Christchurch. Her parents were Annie Harding and Richard Phillips.

Upon her marriage she moved to the West Coast and lived for 26 years in Ōtira. She worked at Ōtira School as a teacher's aide and caretaker. Ngārimu contributed to education initiatives by establishing a Greymouth centre for adult education and served on the committee that established the Tai Poutini Polytechnic. She was also a member of the Post Compulsory Education and Training working party and contributed to the production of a report on education policy to the government. Ngārimu was subsequently employed by the Department of Labour as an access manager. She was then appointed as regional manager of Skill NZ Canterbury and then became a regional manager of the Tertiary Education Commission.

== Artistic career ==
Ngārimu is regarded as a master weaver with this status being formally acknowledged in 2008 when she was appointed by Te Roopu Raranga Whatu and the New Zealand Māori Arts and Crafts Institute to the Kāhui Whiritoi group. As a member of this group Ngārimu hosts students to discuss weaving and encourage the development of exhibitions. She also supports and provides guidance on the strategic direction of Te Roopu Raranga Whatu and champions weaving through national institutions and international networks.

She learnt to weave from her husband's female relations. Ngārimu discussed her first weaving experiences saying:

I was sitting with Judge’s grandmother Mīere, her sister Ngaropi, and her daughter, Te Iwi Pani. They were making kete and I was watching them. They gave me some harakeke and showed me what to do. I was all fingers and thumbs and they had a great time laughing as I tried to figure it out. Ngaropi, the kuia with the moko kauae, would put her walking stick out and touch one of the strands so I knew it was in the wrong place. I’d look at her and I’d shift it and she’d go, ‘kāo, no!’ They would laugh and chatter away, but I didn’t mind at all, because that’s when I really got the feel of harakeke and knew, hey, this is something I want to do.

Ngārimu has created individual works as well as collaborated on weaving projects with other master weavers. She has weaved gifts for the British royal family. She also created a cloak given to the mayor and city of San Francisco. She led a national weaving project creating 800 kete for the 2007 World Heritage Conference in Christchurch. In 2013 Ngārimu led a project in Antarctica creating two tukutuku panels, helping to represent Māori culture at Scott Base. Ngārimu was also commissioned by the New Zealand chapter of Zonta International to design and weave a kākahu (Māori cloak) for use by members representing the chapter at international conventions. Ngārimu subsequently created a kākahu named Tohu Aroha (Gift of Love).

As part of her weaving practice Ngārimu repairs, restores, and replicates customary Māori garments. Since 2018, she has been a member of the team undertaking a three-year research project on Te Rā, the last known Māori sail. She works with Catherine Smith of the University of Otago and Donna Campbell of the University of Waikato studying the sail from a Mātauranga Māori (Māori knowledge) perspective combined with western scientific knowledge.

In 2021/2022 a selection of her works were exhibited at the Christchurch Art Gallery in the Te Puna Waiora: The Distinguished Weavers of Te Kāhui Whiritoi exhibition.

== Notable works ==
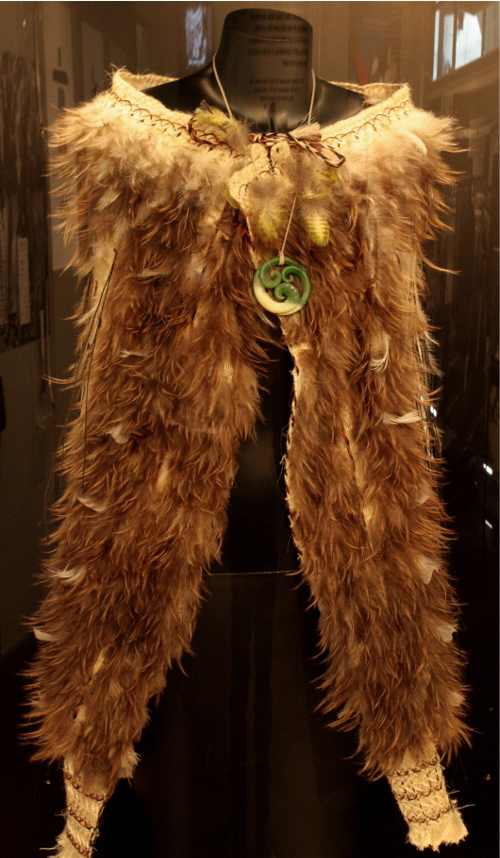
Te Māhutonga (the Southern Cross)

Ngārimu and Te Aue Davis wove Te Māhutonga (the Southern Cross), the Olympic cloak. Te Māhutonga is the cloak that has been worn by the flag bearer of the New Zealand Olympic team since the 2004 Olympics. It took over seven months to make and includes feathers from kiwi, tīeke (saddleback), toroa (albatross) and kākāpō. The design of the cloak incorporates a silver fern pattern (the emblem used by New Zealand sports teams). Te Māhutonga was named by Dame Te Atairangikaahu.

Ngārimu also contributed to the making of the cloak Ngā Here o te Ao. Te Roopu Raranga Whatu o Aotearoa made the kākahu to celebrate the millennium. Other weavers that contributed to the cloak included Cath Brown, Te Aue Davis, Kahutoi Te Kanawa, Diggeress Te Kanawa, Clowdy Ngatai, Reihana Parata, Te Muri Turner, and Katerina Waiari. This cloak is now in the collection of the Te Roopu Raranga Whatu o Aotearoa.

Ngārimu coauthored The Art of Māori Weaving, a book based on an exhibition of Māori weaving at Pātaka Museum in Porirua. The book was a finalist in the Montana Book Awards. This book was the culmination of Ngārimu's participation in the Māori Art Meets America exhibition that visited San Francisco in 2005. The weaving part of this exhibition went on to transform into “The Eternal Thread” and these taonga were exhibited in Portland, Oregon, Washington State, and at the Christchurch Art Gallery. In 2025, The Art of Māori Weaving was listed in Books of Mana as one of the 180 most significant works of Māori-authored non-fiction.

== Community involvement ==
Ngārimu is a member and former chairperson of Te Roopu Raranga Whatu o Aotearoa, having been invited onto the committee of Aotearoa Moananui A Kiwa in 1988. She is heavily involved in supporting and organising Kapa haka performances and events. She is a member of the Waitaha Cultural Council Trust and helped organise the Te Matatini Festival at Hagley Park in 2015. Ngārimu also works to support the use of te reo Māori, volunteering as a teacher of Te Ataarangi and uses as a learning tool cuisenaire rods. She has also been a judge at several Te Matatini competitions.

Ngārimu serves the Governor General of New Zealand performing the role of Pou Whakahaere o Te Waipounamu, assisting and supporting the Governor General with Māori protocol when required. She is also the New Zealand Olympic Committee kuia.

== Awards and honours ==
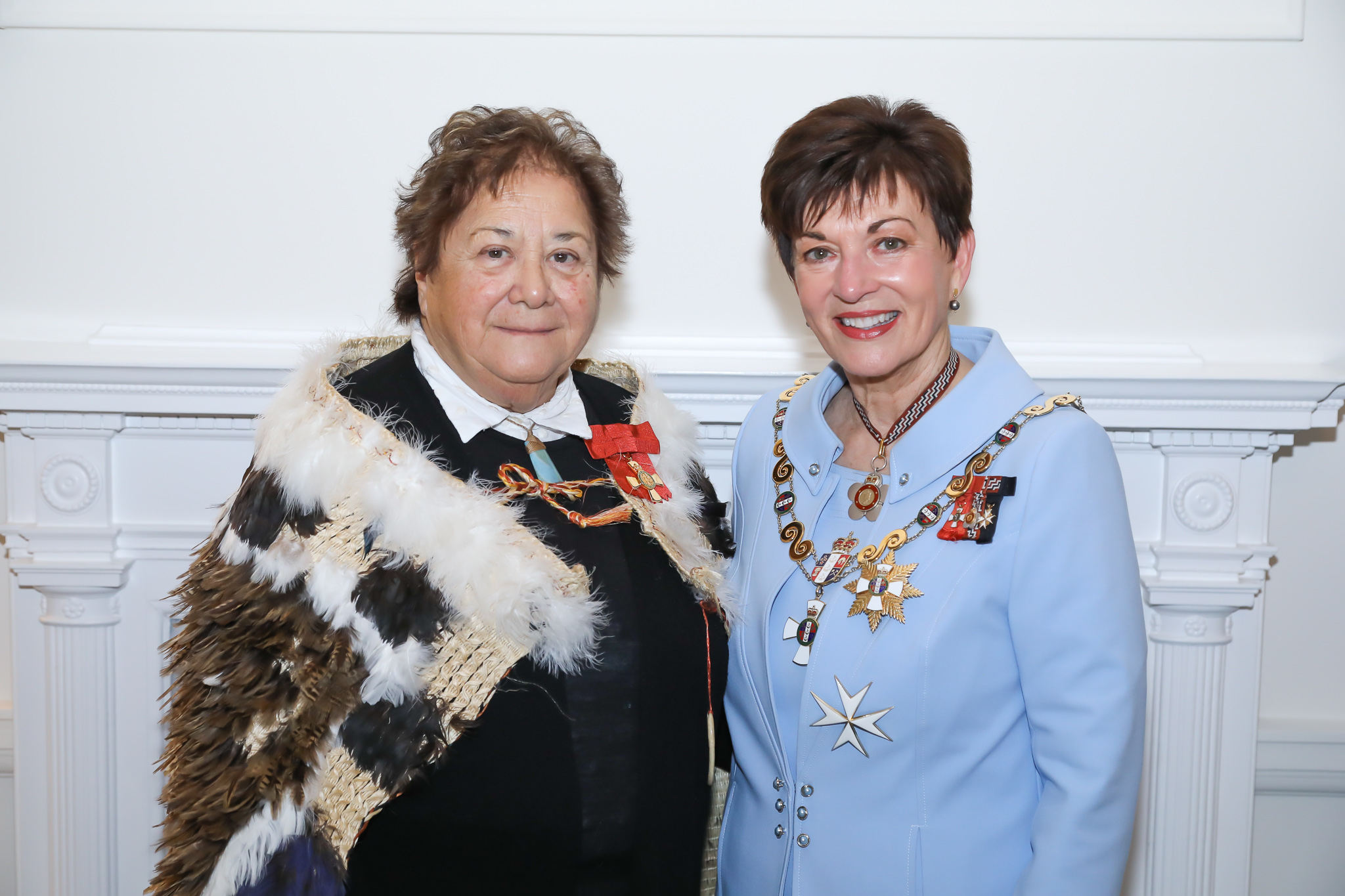
Ngārimu with Governor General Patsy Reddy

In 1986 Ngārimu was voted the West Coast Woman of the Year. In 2018 Ngārimu was the recipient of the Te Waka Toi Ngā Tohu ā Tā Kingi Ihaka (Sir Kingi Ihaka Award), which recognises the recipient's lifetime contribution to Māori arts. Ngārimu was made an Officer of the New Zealand Order of Merit, for services to Māori art and culture, particularly weaving, in the 2020 New Years Honours.

== Family ==
Ngārimu is the sister of Miriama Evans with whom she co-wrote The Art of Māori Weaving. Ngārimu was married to Harold Carr "Judge" Ngārimu who died in 1997, and raised five children with him.

Ngārimu affiliates with Ngāi Tahu and Ngāti Mutungā iwi.

== Selected publications ==
- Evans, M. & Ngārimu, R., The Art of Maori Weaving: The Eternal Thread, Huia Publishers, Wellington, 2006. ISBN 978-1869691615
- Ngārimu, R., My Favourite, (March–May 2007) Bulletin vol. 148 p. 3
- Ngārimu, R., Norman Lemon's Untitled, (23 March 2015) Bulletin vol. 179
