= Angus Macfarlane =

New Zealand psychologist and academic (died 2024)

Angus Macfarlane CNZM FRSNZ
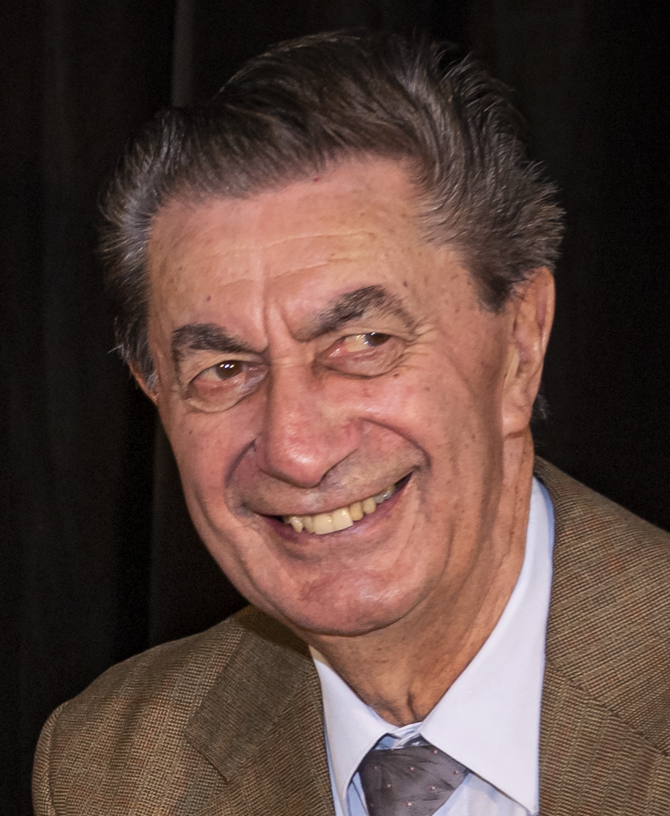
- Macfarlane in 2020
- Born: Angus Hikairo Macfarlane; Rotorua, New Zealand
- Died: 27 November 2024
- Known for: Contribution to Māori research and education
- Spouse: Sonja Macfarlane
- Awards: University of Canterbury Research Medal (2013)

Academic background
- Education: University of Waikato
- Thesis: Culturally inclusive pedagogy for Māori students experiencing learning and behaviour difficulties (2003)

Angus Hikairo Macfarlane CNZM FRSNZ (died 27 November 2024) was a New Zealand academic and professor at the University of Canterbury.

== Early life ==
Macfarlane had mixed Scottish and Māori ancestry, and was born in Rotorua into a family of 14 siblings. His family identify with Ko Te Arawa e waru pumanawa, the "eight beating hearts" of the Te Arawa tribe from the Bay of Plenty region in central North Island.

== Academic career ==
Before a career in tertiary education, Macfarlane was a secondary teacher, head teacher, Liaison Officer for the Ministry of Education, and Advisor for Special Education Services.

His tertiary education career began in 1995 with lectureship and associate professorship positions at the University of Waikato. He received a PhD titled Culturally inclusive pedagogy for Māori students experiencing learning and behaviour difficulties in 2003.

Macfarlane moved to the University of Canterbury in 2009. He was the professor of Māori research and the director of the Te Ru Rangahau: Maori Education Research Laboratory.

== Research ==
Macfarlane's research focused on the organisation of teaching and learning in schools where structures and engagement emphasise Māori preferred ways of teaching and learning.

=== The Educultural Wheel ===
Macfarlane's research around these topics resulted in his creation of the "Educultural Wheel", which was first seen in his 2004 book, Kia hiwa ra! Listen to culture: Maori students plea to educators. It was initially a management strategy, designed to increase the development of successful teacher/student interactions with Maori students. It derived from previous research which showed that what Maori students identified as being most beneficial to their learning, was the relationships they had with their teachers. When put into practice, the theory showed significant benefits for not only Maori students, but for students of all cultures. This theory of student management strategy was based around the research and beliefs of many of Macfarlane's favourite theorists from his educational psychology background.

According to Macfarlane, in relation to the Educultural Wheel:

"these concepts do not exist in isolation from each other – more often than not, they co-exist or are amalgamated. Since Maori insist on wholeness, this is quite natural".

The Educultural Wheel is made up of five interwoven concepts that cover the bases of all aspects of the classroom, these are: Whanaungatanga (Building relationships), Kotahitanga (Ethic of Bonding), Manaakitanga (Ethic of care), Rangatiratanga (Teacher effectiveness), and Pumanawatanga (General classroom morale, pulse, tone).

== Personal life and death ==
Macfarlane's wife Sonja Macfarlane is an associate professor at the University of Canterbury. He died on 27 November 2024, and was buried at Kauae Cemetery in Ngongotahā.

== Awards and honours ==
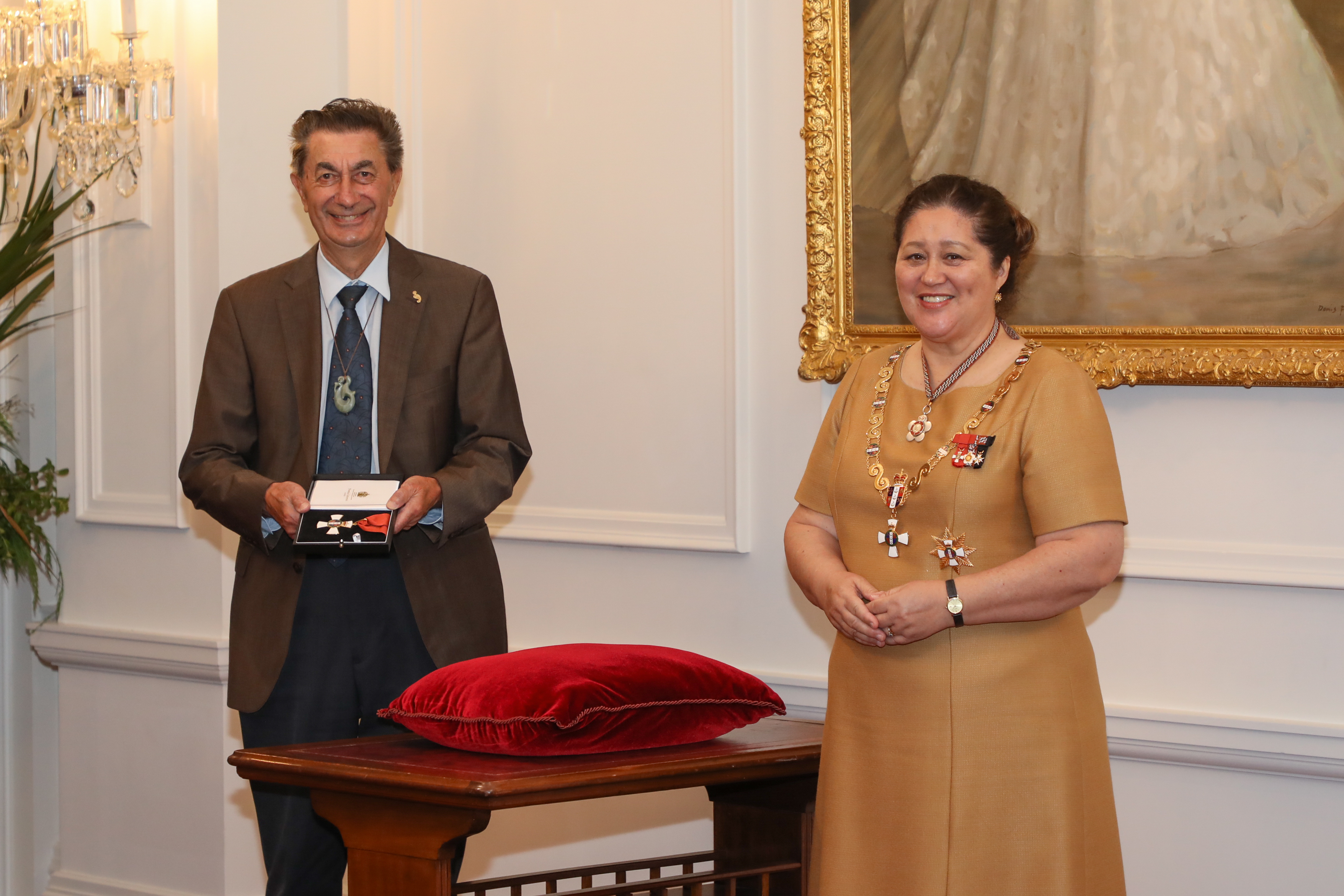
Macfarlane (left), after his investiture as a Companion of the New Zealand Order of Merit by the governor-general, Dame Cindy Kiro, at Government House, Wellington, on 14 December 2021

In 2010, Macfarlane received the Tohu Pae Tawhiti Award from the New Zealand Council for Educational Research for outstanding contributions to Māori research. In 2013, he was awarded the University of Canterbury Research Medal in recognition of his outstanding contribution to Māori research and education. He was the first Māori to be awarded the medal. Macfarlane was elected Fellow of the Royal Society Te Apārangi in 2018.

In the 2021 Queen's Birthday Honours, Macfarlane was appointed a Companion of the New Zealand Order of Merit, for services to education, psychology and Māori.

== Selected works ==
- Macfarlane A. (2004) Kia hiwa rā! Listen to culture: Māori students' plea to educators. Wellington: NZCER Press. ISBN 978-1-877293-29-0
- Macfarlane AH. (2007) Discipline, Democracy and Diversity: working with students with behaviour difficulties. Wellington: NZCER Press. 204pp. ISBN 978-1-877398-26-1
- Macfarlane A., Christensen J. and Mataiti H. (2010) Above the clouds: A Collection of readings for identifying and nurturing Māori students of promise = Ka rewa ake ki ngā kapua. Christchurch: Te Waipounamu Focus Group, University of Canterbury. 231pp. ISBN 978-0-473165-13-0
- Margrain V. and Macfarlane A. (2011) Responsive pedagogy: Engaging restoratively with challenging behaviour. Wellington: NZCER Press. 273pp. ISBN 978-1-927151-15-0
- Macfarlane A, Macfarlane S, Teirney S, Kuntz JR, Rarere-Briggs B, Currie M, and Macfarlane R. (2019) The Hikairo Schema: Culturally responsive teaching and learning in early childhood education settings Wellington: NZCER Press. 32pp. ISBN 978-1-988542-64-5
