= Arapera Royal Tangaere =

New Zealand Māori early childhood education leader

Arapera Royal Tangaere CNZM
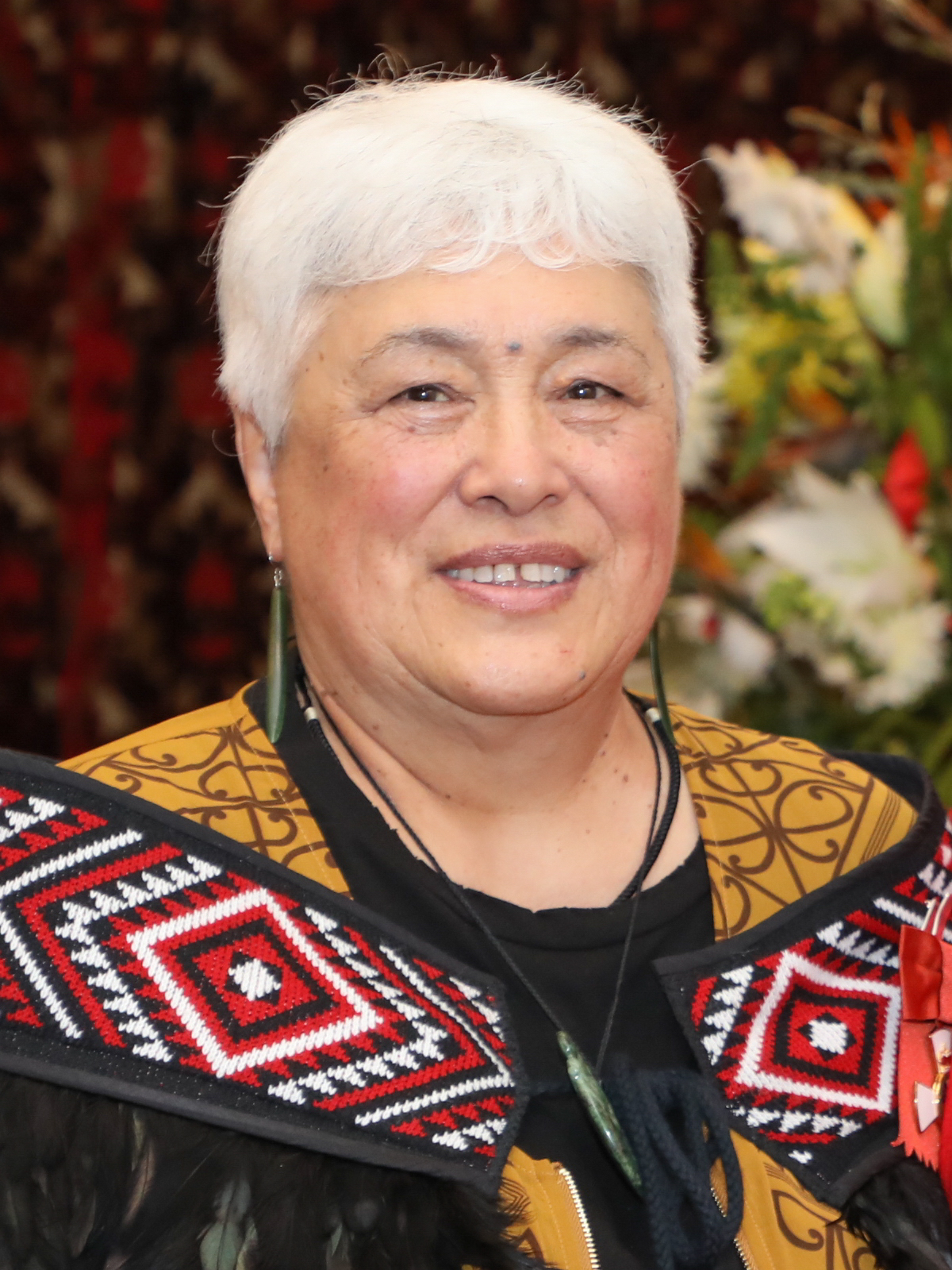
- Awards: Companion of the New Zealand Order of Merit, Herbison Lecture

Academic background
- Education: University of Auckland
- Thesis: Te Hokinga ki te ukaipoa: A socio-cultural construction of Māori language development: Kōhanga Reo and home (2012)
- Doctoral advisor: Colleen McMurchy-Pilkington, Stuart McNaughton

Arapera Royal Tangaere CNZM (born 1950) is a New Zealand early childhood education leader and advocate for the Māori language. She has worked in early childhood education for more than forty years. In 2022 Royal Tangaere was appointed a Companion of the New Zealand Order of Merit for services to Māori and education.

== Early life and education ==
Royal Tangaere is Māori, and affiliates to Te Arawa, Ngāti Raukawa and Kai Tahu iwi.

Royal Tangaere has a Bachelor of Arts from the University of Otago, and a Diploma in Teaching and a Master of Arts from the University of Auckland. She completed a PhD titled Te Hokinga ki te ukaipoa: A socio-cultural construction of Māori language development: Kōhanga Reo and home at the University of Auckland in 2012. Royal Tangaere also completed the Te Tohu Mātauranga Whakapakari Tino Rangatiratanga o Te Kōhanga Reo professional degree in 2019.

== Career ==
Royal Tangaere began her involvement with early childhood education in 1975. In 1982 she became involved with the Te Kōhanga Reo National Trust. Kōhanga reo are early childhood programmes that provide education to children up to the age of 6 years in a Māori language environment. Royal Tangaere was the Te Kōhanga Reo National Trust National Advisor and manager for 26 years, developing the curriculum for kōhanga reo and overseeing teaching qualifications. Royal Tangaere has conducted research to enable parent-led early childhood education to be better supported by the Ministry of Education.

== Honours and awards ==
In 1996 Royal Tangaere was awarded the Herbison Lecture by the New Zealand Association for Research in Education. In the 2022 New Year Honours Royal Tangaere was appointed a Companion of the New Zealand Order of Merit for services to Māori and education.

== Selected works ==
- Tangaere, Arapera; McNaughton, Stuart (2014). "From preschool to home: processes of generalisation in language acquisition from an indigenous language recovery programme". International Journal of Early Years Education. 2 (1): 23–40. doi:10.1080/09669760.2003.10807104. Wikidata Q113278475.
- Tangaere, Arapera; McNaughton, Stuart (2010). "From preschool to home: processes of generalisation in language acquisition from an indigenous language recovery programme". International Journal of Early Years Education. 2 (1): 23–40. doi:10.1080/0966976940020104a. Wikidata Q113278467.
- Mitchell, Linda; Royal-Tangaere, Arapera; Mara, Diane; Wylie, Cathie (2006). Quality in parent/whänau-led services: Summary Report (Research Report). NZCER.
