= Doug Booth =

New Zealand Australian-rules footballer

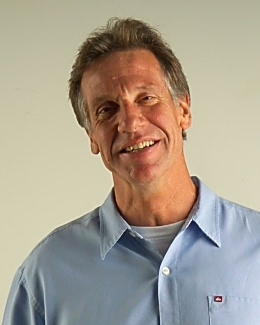
- Booth in 2007

Personal information
- Full name: Douglas George Booth
- Born: 1 August 1957 (age 69)
- Original team: East Brighton
- Height: 185 cm (6 ft 1 in)
- Weight: 85 kg (187 lb)

Playing career^{1}
Years	Club	Games (Goals)
1976–1978, 1982	St Kilda	24 (4)
- ^{1} Playing statistics correct to the end of 1982.

Douglas George Booth (born 1 August 1957) is an Australian academic and former Australian rules footballer who played with St Kilda in the Victorian Football League (VFL). He is dean of the School of Physical Education at the University of Otago.

== Football career ==
A recruit from East Brighton, Booth was part of a memorable win on his senior debut. Selected as one of St Kilda's reserves for their round 12 fixture against ladder leaders Hawthorn at Princes Park, Booth got his first taste of league football when he was called onto the field as a replacement Wayne Judson. Early in the third quarter St Kilda trailed by 44 points, but were spurred by the sight of rover Paul Callery being knocked unconscious, and came back to upset Hawthorn with a 25-point win. He had to wait until round 16 to make his next appearance, a win over Collingwood at Victoria Park, in which he contributed two goals. By the end of his first year of VFL football he had played five games and he added just one more in the 1977 season, which was in the opening round.

Booth, who wore the number 38, came back in the 1978 season as a regular member of the St Kilda side for the first time in his career. The club had a strong start to the season, moving to second on the ladder after a win over Essendon in what was described as a spiteful round seven encounter. During the game, Booth was one of three St Kilda players reported, but was cleared by the tribunal. His second visit to the tribunal, following St Kilda's round 11 loss to Carlton, resulted in a two-match suspension, for striking Greg Towns. This ended his run of 11 consecutive games. He did not play any VFL football from 1979 to 1981, but returned in the 1982 VFL season to make four appearances. In round two against Melbourne at the MCG, Booth suffered concussion and was required to spend the night in hospital. His final appearance came in round 13, a record breaking loss to the Swans, when the club formerly known as South Melbourne amassed their highest ever score, 199 points.

He is often remembered for his actions during the second half of the Queen's Birthday clash against Collingwood in 1978 when he attempted to kick a stray dog that had wandered onto the field.

Booth was the winner of the Avis Grand Final Mile in 1978, in a time of 4:41, to win the $1000 prize. This long-distance event was the precursor to today's Grand Final Sprint, which began the following year.

== Academia ==
Booth, an alumnus of the University of Melbourne, was a postgraduate student and researcher in South Africa during the 1980s. He undertook his research, into politics of economic underdevelopment under apartheid, at the Development Studies Unit in the University of Natal. Under the supervision of Colin Tatz, Booth completed his PhD at Macquarie University's Politics Department. His thesis, which was published in 1992, traced the history of the sports boycott in South Africa, titled The South African way of life a study in race, politics, and sport. In 1994 he began lecturing at the University of Otago in New Zealand, on the history of sport. He was at the University of Waikato from 2004 until 2007, when he returned to the University of Otago as the dean of the School of Physical Education. Notable students of Booth include Katie Fitzpatrick.

== Bibliography ==
- The Race Game: Politics and Sport in South Africa (London, Frank Cass, 1998).
- One-Eyed: A View of Australian Sport (co-author Colin Tatz) (Sydney, Allen & Unwin, 2000).
- Australian Beach Cultures: The History of Sun, Sand and Surf (London, Frank Cass, 2002).
- The Field: Truth and Fiction in Sport History (London, Routledge, 2005).
