= E. Jayne White =

Professor of early childhood education in New Zealand

Academic background
- Education: Monash University
- Thesis: Assessment in New Zealand early childhood education: a Bakhtinian analysis of toddler metaphoricity (2009)
- Doctoral advisor: Joce Nuttall

Elizabeth Jayne White is a New Zealand early childhood teacher and academic, and is a full professor at the University of Canterbury, specialising in dialogic philosophy and early years pedagogy.

== Academic career ==
White has worked as an early childhood teacher as well in academia. White completed a PhD titled Assessment in New Zealand early childhood education: a Bakhtinian analysis of toddler metaphoricity at Monash University. White has worked at a number of Australian and New Zealand universities, including the University of Otago, the Open Polytechnic of New Zealand, Victoria University of Wellington and the University of Waikato. She was promoted to full professor at the Royal Melbourne Institute of Technology. White then joined the faculty of the University of Canterbury, where she was appointed as Professor of Early Childhood Education.

White is president and one of the founders of the Association for Visual Pedagogies, which was founded in 2015 to "expan[d] understandings and practices that advance critical engagement with, about and for visual pedagogies". She is also editor-in-chief of the journal Video Journal of Education and Pedagogy. She is the series editor of Brill's series Visual Pedagogies, Methodologies, and Educational Research. White is a Fellow of the Philosophy of Education Society of Australia.

White's research focuses on dialogic philosophy and educational pedagogies in the early years. In 2024 she is working with Canterbury colleague Ngaroma Williams to explore children's relationships with their local waterscapes, using Waitarakao Washdyke Lagoon as the site of their investigation.

== Selected works ==
- E. Jayne White. (2020) Seeing the World through Children's Eyes.Visual Methodologies and Approaches to Research in the Early Years: 1. Brill. ISBN 978-90-04-43331-1
- Petar Jandrić; David Hayes; Ian Truelove; et al. (2020). "Teaching in the Age of Covid-19". Postdigital Science and Education. 2 (3): 1069–1230. doi:10.1007/s42438-020-00169-6. PMC 7411270. Wikidata Q122359065.
- Peters, Michael Adrian; Petar Jandrić; Ruth Irwin; et al. (2016). "Towards a philosophy of academic publishing". Educational Philosophy and Theory. 48 (14): 1401–1425. doi:10.1080/00131857.2016.1240987. Wikidata Q57810009.
- White, Elizabeth Jayne (2013). "Bakhtinian Dialogic and Vygotskian Dialectic: Compatabilities and contradictions in the classroom?". Educational Philosophy and Theory. 46 (3): 220–236. doi:10.1111/j.1469-5812.2011.00814.x. Wikidata Q126174633.
- E.J. White; M. Peter; B. Redder (2015). "Infant and teacher dialogue in education and care: A pedagogical imperative". Early Childhood Research Quarterly. 30: 160–173. doi:10.1016/j.ecresq.2014.10.008. Wikidata Q126174634.
- S. Farquhar; White, Elizabeth Jayne (2013). "Philosophy and Pedagogy of Early Childhood". Educational Philosophy and Theory. 46 (8): 821–832. doi:10.1080/00131857.2013.783964. Wikidata Q126174635.
