= Kuni Kaa Jenkins =

New Zealand educational researcher and author

Kuni Kaa Jenkins (born 1941) is a New Zealand educationalist and author. She is a professor in education at Te Whare Wānanga o Awanuiārangi. She has researched early Māori written documents, focusing on relationships between Māori and Pākehā. She co-authored the 2018 Ockham New Zealand Book Awards winner Tuai: A Traveller in Two Worlds.

== Early life and education ==
Kaa Jenkins was born in Pōrangahau, Hawke's Bay, New Zealand in 1941. She affiliates with the Māori iwi Ngāti Porou.

She studied at Wellington Teachers' College training and trained as a teacher before working in primary schools in the Hutt Valley. She was also a teacher in the 1980s in Christchurch at schools in Linwood and St. Martins and then in Auckland including being the Principal of Aka Aka County School and Oruawharo School and in 1983-88 Assistant Principal at Kingsford School, Mangere.

She returned to study in the late 1980s and graduated in 1987 with a BA in Māori Studies and Education from University of Auckland. She completed a Masters in Education graduating in 1990. Kaa Jenkins has a PhD from University of Auckland awarded in 2000 titled Haere tahi tāua: an account of aitanga in Maori struggle for schooling. She is a professor of education at Te Whare Wānanga o Awanuiārangi.

== Career ==
In 2011 as an extension of a Marsden grant Kaa Jenkins published a book He Kōrero: Words Between Us; First Māori–Pākehā Conversations on Paper (Huia Publishers) co-authored with Alison Jones. The research was about early Māori writing and the two-way teaching and learning relationships between Māori and Pākehā from 1769 to 1826. The book is structured in 16 chapters where Kaa Jenkins and Jones wrote about 16 'different textual artefacts or groups of artifacts' they encountered at various archives and libraries. An example is a letter to the chief of Rangihoua pā, Ruatara, in 1814 by Samuel Marsden. In 2012 this book won Best Book in Higher Education Publishing at the CLNZ Educational Publishing Awards, Te Kōrero Pono - Non-fiction at the Ngā Kupu Ora Māori Book Awards and an award at the Publishers Association New Zealand (PANZ) Book Design Awards. The research work was also an exhibition.

In 2012 Kaa Jenkins was appointed head of social services organisation Ririki, succeeding founding chairperson Hone Kaa.

Kaa Jenkins book Tuai: A Traveller in Two Worlds co-authored with Alison Jones and published by Bridget Williams Books won the 2018 Ockham New Zealand Book Awards in the Illustrated Non-Fiction category. The book is about two young Māori men who travelled in 1817 to England, Ngare Raumati chief Tuai and Tītere. Reviewer Briar Wood describes how in this book Jones and Kaa Jenkins use primary sources such as letters and journals and a 'cautious interpretation of the significance of Tuai’s journey' to create a 'profoundly interconnected book'. The book was launched in 2017 at Kororareka Marae in the Bay of Islands. It is part of a series 'Te Takarangi: Celebrating Māori' produced by the Royal Society Te Apārangi and Ngā Pae o te Māramatanga. The Ockham prize money was put towards a trip of Ngare Raumati to London to take some of Tuai’s drawings loaned to an exhibition Oceania at the Royal Academy of the Arts.

The writing partnership between Kaa Jenkins and Jones has been a long one and extends to academic papers.

Kaa Jenkins has appeared at the Auckland Writers Festival.

== Books ==
- He Kōrero: Words Between Us; First Māori–Pākehā Conversations on Paper (2011) co-authored with Alison Jones, Huia Publishers ISBN 9780947518806
- Tuai: A Traveller in Two Worlds (2018) co-authored with Alison Jones and published by Bridget Williams Books

== Selected academic articles ==
- Pedagogical events: re‐reading shared moments in educational history (Aug 2004) co-authored with Alison Jones
- Indigenous Discourse and “the Material”: A Post-interpretivist Argument (Aug 2008) co-authored with Alison Jones
- Cross-cultural Engagement in Higher Education Classrooms: a Critical View of Dialogue (Jan 2007) co-authored with Alison Jones

== Awards ==
- Best Book in Higher Education Publishing (Copyright Licensing New Zealand) (2012) - He Kōrero: Words Between Us; First Māori–Pākehā Conversations on Paper co-authored with Alison Jones, Huia Publishers
- Ngā Kupu Ora Māori Book Awards (2012) - He Kōrero: Words Between Us; First Māori–Pākehā Conversations on Paper co-authored with Alison Jones, Huia Publishers
- PANZ Book Design Award (2012) - He Kōrero: Words Between Us; First Māori–Pākehā Conversations on Paper co-authored with Alison Jones, Huia Publishers
- Best Illustrated Non-Fiction Ockham New Zealand Book Awards (2018) - Tuai: A Traveller in Two Worlds co-authored with Alison Jones and published by Bridget Williams Books
