= Sonja Macfarlane =

New Zealand academic

Sonja Macfarlane FRSNZ
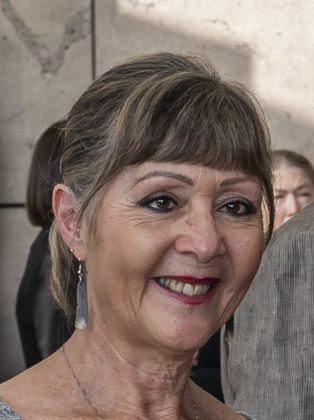
- Macfarlane in 2020
- Born: Sonja Lee Bateman
- Partner: Angus Hikairo Macfarlane

Academic background
- Education: University of Canterbury
- Thesis: In Pursuit of Culturally Responsive Evidence Based Special Education Pathways in Aotearoa New Zealand: Whaia ki te ara tika (2012)
- Doctoral advisor: Dean Sutherland

Sonja Lee Macfarlane FRSNZ (née Bateman) is a New Zealand education academic and an associate professor at the University of Canterbury. Macfarlane specialises in the development of cultural awareness in the New Zealand education system.

== Academic career ==
After a PhD titled In Pursuit of Culturally Responsive Evidence Based Special Education Pathways in Aotearoa New Zealand: Whaia ki te ara tika at the University of Canterbury completed in 2012, Macfarlane moved to Te Kura o te Mātauranga Institute of Education at Massey University, and then to the University of Canterbury, rising to associate professor.

== Awards ==
In 2021 Macfarlane was elected as a Fellow of the Royal Society Te Apārangi. Her nomination said "Sonja has played a key role in the advancement of alternative ways for educators and psychologists to improve cultural awareness and responsivity, leading to the implementation of practices that accrue benefits for Māori learners (education) and clients (psychology). Her culturally-grounded publications and applied practice models in these disciplines have established her as an authority on the ways professionals can engage authentically within their professional spaces." Also in 2021, Macfarlane was awarded the Dame Marie Clay Award by the New Zealand Psychological Society.

== Personal life ==
Macfarlane is affiliated with Ngāi Tahu and Ngāti Waewae iwi. Her husband Angus Hikairo Macfarlane was a professor of Māori research at the University of Canterbury.

== Selected works ==
- Kathleen Liberty; Michael Tarren-Sweeney; Macfarlane, Sonja Lee; Arindam Basu; James Reid (2016). "Behavior Problems and Post-traumatic Stress Symptoms in Children Beginning School: A Comparison of Pre- and Post-Earthquake Groups". PLOS Currents. 8. doi:10.1371/currents.dis.2821c82fbc27d0c2aa9e00cff532b402. PMC 5419821. PMID 28503358. Wikidata Q36371500.
- Harris, Leona; Davis, Niki; Una Cunningham; Lia de Vocht; Macfarlane, Sonja Lee; Nikita Gregory; Saili Aukuso; Tufulasifa'atafatafa Ova Taleni; Jan Dobson (2018). "Exploring the Opportunities and Challenges of the Digital World for Early Childhood Services with Vulnerable Children". International Journal of Environmental Research and Public Health. 15 (11). doi:10.3390/ijerph15112407. PMC 6265693. PMID 30380766. Wikidata Q58095556.
- Scarf, Damian Kieron; Waitoki, Waikaremoana; Joanna Chan; Eileen Britt; Nikora, Linda Waimarie; Tia Neha; Irie Schimanski; Macfarlane, Angus; Macfarlane, Sonja Lee; Simon T Bennett; John A Hunter; Hitaua G Arahanga-Doyle; Max Abbott (2019). "Holding a mirror to society? Sociodemographic diversity within clinical psychology training programmes across Aotearoa". The New Zealand Medical Journal. 132 (1495): 79–81. PMID 31095548. Wikidata Q92074393.
- Macfarlane, Angus; Macfarlane, Sonja Lee (2016). The Hikairo Schema: culturally responsive teaching in early years settings. University of Canterbury. ISBN 978-0-473-34694-2. OCLC 979928442. Wikidata Q115291508.
- Macfarlane, Angus; Macfarlane, Sonja Lee; Webber, Melinda, eds. (2015). Sociocultural realities: exploring new horizons (in English and English). Christchurch: Canterbury University Press. ISBN 978-1-927145-72-2. LCCN 2017431032. OCLC 946520754. OL 40427091M. Wikidata Q115291505.
- Jill Bevan-Brown; Berryman, Mere Anne; Huhana Hickey; Macfarlane, Sonja Lee; Kirsten Smiler; Tai Walker (2015). Working with Māori children with special education needs: he mahi whakahirahira. New Zealand Council for Educational Research. ISBN 978-1-927231-43-2. OCLC 904549068. Wikidata Q115291517.
