= Colin Tatz =

Australian political scientist (1934–2019)

- Born: Colin Martin Tatz; 18 July 1934; Berea, Johannesburg, South Africa
- Died: 19 November 2019 (aged 85); Sydney, Australia
- Occupations: Academic, writer
- Known for: Aboriginal and Torres Strait Islander policy Jewish studies Sociocultural anthropology Sociology of sport Comparative genocide

Academic background
- Education: University of Natal; Australian National University

Academic work
- Discipline: Political science

Colin Martin Tatz AO (18 July 1934 – 19 November 2019) was a South African-born Australian political scientist and public intellectual. He was the director of the Australian Institute for Holocaust and Genocide Studies and professor of politics at the University of New England, Armidale, and held positions at the Australian National University in Canberra as well as Macquarie University in Sydney. He published prolifically, including on Aboriginal and Torres Strait Islander history and politics, cultural anthropology, and racism in sport.

== Early life and education ==
Colin Martin Tatz was born on 18 July 1934 in the inner city suburb of Berea in Johannesburg, South Africa, to Jewish parents. His father was Maurice Tatz, a men's outfitter, and his mother Bessie, a secretary (born Isaacson).

He attended Yeoville Boys School, a primary school in Yeoville in inner-city Johannesburg. He then attended King Edward VII School in the city, where around 30% of the students were Jewish.

He graduated from the University of Natal in Pietermaritzburg in Natal province with a BA in 1954, Honours year in 1955, and a Master of Arts in 1960. For a masters degree under Edgar Brookes, his research on native administration was published in 1962 as Shadow and Substance in South Africa, A Study in Land and Franchise Policies Affecting Africans, 1910–1960. He funded his studies by working for the local newspaper, The Natal Witness.

Tatz emigrated to Australia at the end of 1960, after the Sharpeville massacre, with his wife, Sandra (who was pregnant with their first child), after being offered a scholarship by Australian National University (ANU) to work on policy and practice in Aboriginal administration, based on work he had done in South Africa. In 1964 Tatz received his PhD from ANU, publishing a thesis entitled "Aboriginal Administration in the Northern Territory".

== Career ==
Tatz was employed at Monash University as a senior lecturer of politics and sociology from early 1964. During his time there, he founded the Aboriginal Research Centre (later renamed Indigenous Studies RC).

From 1971 until 1982 he was foundation professor of politics at the University of New England in Armidale.

He was then appointed chair of politics at Macquarie University in Sydney, retiring in July 1999 and later becoming visiting professor at the university 1999–2004, during which time he was director of the Center for Comparative Genocide Studies from 1992 to 1999.

From 2011, Tatz was involved with the School of Politics and International Relations at the Australian National University as a visiting fellow, then visiting professor (from 2004) and honorary lecturer.

He authored several books and published articles on race politics, genocide, the Holocaust, antisemitism, and racism and discrimination in sport.

=== Areas of expertise ===
Tatz wrote about topics such as The Holocaust, antisemitism, and racism in sport. He had special expertise in:

- Aboriginal and Torres Strait Islander policy
- Jewish studies
- Social and cultural anthropology
- The role of sport in society
- Comparative genocide

== Other roles and activies ==
While undertaking his PhD at ANU, Tatz became involved in the events following the presenting of the Yirrkala bark petitions to the Australian Parliament in August 1963. After Cecil Gribble, President General of the General Conference of the Methodist Church of Australasia moved to remove Edgar Wells from his post as superintendent of the Yirrkala mission, Tatz wrote in support of Wells, who had supported the Yolngu people's land rights claim. Tatz had identified criteria for successful administration of Indigenous peoples, based on his work in South Africa, and, according to these criteria, the only two people who qualified as good administrators were Wells and Ted Evans, a patrol officer in the Native Affairs branch of the Northern Territory Administration.

From 1999 until 2004, Tatz was director of the Australian Institute for Holocaust and Genocide Studies at the Shalom Institute at the University of New South Wales.

From 2004 he was a visiting research fellow at the Australian Institute of Aboriginal and Torres Strait Islander Studies.

== Recognition and awards ==
- 1995: Co-winner, Australian Human Rights Award for Non-Fiction, for Obstacle Race: Aborigines in Sport (1995)
- 1997: Officer of the Order of Australia in the Australia Day Honours List, for service to the community through research into social and legal justice for people disadvantaged by their race, particularly the Aboriginal community, and to promoting the equal participation in community life of all Australians
- 1997: Doctor of Laws Honoris Causa, University of Natal
- 2003: Fellow of the Australian Society for Sports History
- 2017: Festschrift for Colin Tatz: Genocide Perspectives V: A Global Crime, Australian Voices, eds. Nikki Marczak and Kirril Shields, Sydney, UTS ePress, 2017

== Selected publications ==
Tatz authored numerous books, journal articles, conference papers, and book chapters. Some of his published books include:

=== Author and co-author ===
- Shadow and Substance in South Africa, A Study in Land and Franchise Policies Affecting Africans, 1910–1960 (1962).
- Aboriginal administration in the Northern Territory of Australia (1964; PhD thesis)
- Race Politics in Australia: Aborigines, Politics and Law (1979).
- Aborigines and Uranium and Other Essays (1982).
- Aborigines in Sport, Australian Society for Sports History (1987).
- The Royal Sydney Golf Club: The First Hundred Years, with Brian Stoddart (1993).
- Obstacle Race: Aborigines in Sport (1995) – Co-winner of the Australian Human Rights Award for Non-Fiction.
- Black Diamonds: The Aboriginal and Islander Sports Hall of Fame, with Paul Tatz (1996).
- AFL's Black Stars, by Colin Tatz et al., with an introduction by Michael Long (1998).
- One-Eyed: a View of Australian Sport, with Douglas Booth (2000).
- Black Gold: the Aboriginal and Islander Sports Hall of Fame, with Paul Tatz (2000).
- Aboriginal Suicide is Different: a Portrait of Life and Self-Destruction (2001).
- A Course of History: Monash Country Club, 1931 – 2001 (2002).
- Worlds Apart: the Re-Migration of South African Jews, with Peter Arnold and Gillian Heller (2007).
- Genocide in Australia: By Accident or Design? (2011).
- Genocide Perspectives IV: Essays on Holocaust and Genocide, ed. Colin Tatz (2012).
- Human Rights and Human Wrongs: A Life Confronting Racism, Melbourne, Monash University Publishing, 2015.
- The Magnitude of Genocide, with Winton Higgins, Santa Barbara, CA, Praeger Security International, 2016.
- Australia's Unthinkable Genocide, Bloomington, IN, Xlibris., 2017.
- Black Pearls: The Aboriginal and Islander Sports Hall of Fame, with Paul Tatz, Aboriginal Studies Press, 2018.
- The Sealed Box of Suicide: The Contexts of Self-Death, with Simon Tatz, Zug, Switzerland: Springer. 2019.

=== Editor and co-editor ===
- Aborigines in the Economy, eds. Ian Sharp and Colin Tatz (1966).
- Aborigines and Education, eds. S.S. Dunn and C.M. Tatz (1969).
- Black Viewpoints: The Aboriginal Experience, ed. C.M. Tatz (1975).
- Genocide Perspectives I, editor-in-chief (1997).
- Genocide Perspectives II: Essays in Holocaust and Genocide, eds. Colin Tatz, Peter Arnold and Sandra Tatz (2003).
- With Intent to Destroy: Reflecting on Genocide (2003).
- Genocide Perspectives III: Essays in Holocaust and Genocide, eds. Colin Tatz, Peter Arnold and Sandra Tatz (2006).

== Personal life ==
Tatz met his wife, Sandra Cecile Melmed, a researcher and editor, in South Africa, and they married on 9 December 9, 1957. They have three children, including Simon, who was a writer for ABC News until 2016, and a senior adviser to the Australian Labor Party and the Australian Greens. He was formerly director of communications for the Mental Health Council of Australia and media & marketing manager for ACT Health.
