= National Association for Special Educational Needs =

NASEN
- Industry: Education
- Founded: 1992
- Headquarters: Tamworth, United Kingdom
- Key people: Annamarie Hassall MBE(Chief Executive)
- Services: Training and development of education professionals supporting those with special educational needs
- Website: www.nasen.org.uk

The National Association for Special Educational Needs (nasen) A not-for-profit charity, and the leading professional membership body dedicated to promoting the education, training, advancement, and development of individuals with special educational needs, disabilities, or learning differences. The organisation provides advice, training and support to education professionals and its work on behalf of its members helps to inform special educational needs policy.

== History ==
The organisation began in December 1991 when the National Association for Remedial Education (NARE) joined with the National Council for Special Education (NCSE) in order to create NASEN. NASEN now operates at many levels and is open to all those who wish to advance the education of those with special needs.

== Activities ==
nasen produces resources such as teaching programmes for special education and provides an advisory service to help inform policy on members' behalf. The charity also publishes a range of journals including the British Journal of Special Education, Support for Learning, Journal of Research in Special Educational Needs, as well as the education magazine Special.

nasen runs events and conferences that are focused on developing the professional skills and practices that are needed for working with children and young people with special and additional educational needs and disabilities. The annual nasen Live offers targeted CPD seminars and helps educators keep abreast of policy changes and changes to schools' statutory responsibilities. In 2017, NASEN's Chief Executive, Dr Adam Boddison, replaced the long-standing 'Special' magazine, with the more modern 'nasen Connect'.

In 2018, nasen acquired the Whole School SEND consortium from London Leadership Strategy, and Dr Adam Boddison was appointed as chair of the consortium.

In 2021, Prof Adam Boddison left NASEN to become CEO of the Association for Project Management. Annamarie Hassall MBE was appointed as CEO of NASEN in October 2021.

== Structure ==
A board of trustees governs the affairs of the association in line with the powers expressed in the Memorandum and Articles of the association. The trustees delegate the day-to-day business of the association to the chief executive officer.

nasen's advisory groups have the responsibility of providing sector-specific intelligence and support to the trustees and the CEO to ensure the aims and objects of the association are fully achieved in line with the strategic plan.
