= Joce Nuttall =

Education professor in New Zealand

Jocelyn Nuttall
- Born: 1961
- Awards: Fellow of the Australian Teacher Education Association

Academic background
- Education: University of Canterbury, Dunedin Teachers' Training College
- Theses: Women, capitalism and feminisation: workers' experiences in private and non-profit childcare centres (1992); Why don't you ask someone who cares? (2004)

Academic work
- Institutions: University of Canterbury, Australian Catholic University
- Doctoral students: E. Jayne White

Jocelyn "Joce" Grace Nuttall is a New Zealand education academic, and is a full professor at the University of Canterbury, specialising in teacher education, early childhood curriculum policy and workforce capacity-building.

== Academic career ==
Nuttall qualified as a teacher at the Dunedin College of Education and the University of Otago, and taught in primary schools in New Zealand and Australia before moving into early childhood education. She was appointed as a senior lecturer at Christchurch College of Education in 1990. Nuttall completed a master's degree in education in 1992 titled Women, capitalism and feminisation: workers' experiences in private and non-profit childcare centres at the University of Canterbury. In 2004 she completed a PhD at Victoria University of Wellington, with a thesis titled Why don't you ask someone who cares?. Nuttall first worked at Monash University before moving to the Australian Catholic University in 2011, where she was Research Director of Teacher Education. Nuttall then joined the faculty of the University of Canterbury, rising to full professor. As of 2024 Nuttall is Executive Dean for the Faculty of Education at Canterbury.

Nuttall's research focuses on the education of teachers and educational leaders. She is also interested in how to develop workforce capacity-building in early childhood education, and in early childhood curriculum policy.

Nuttall edited the first two editions ofWeaving te Whāriki: Aotearoa New Zealand’s early childhood curriculum document in theory and practice, a series of critical reflections on the New Zealand early childhood curriculum, and was joined by Alexandra Gunn for the third edition.

== Honours and awards ==
Nuttall was elected a Distinguished Member of the Australian Teachers Education Association in 2019. She was awarded the Australian Catholic University Vice-Chancellor’s Medal for Research Excellence in 2018.

== Selected works ==
- Alexandra Gunn and Joce Nuttall (eds) Weaving te Whāriki: Aotearoa New Zealand’s early childhood curriculum document in theory and practice New Zealand Council for Educational Research. 3 editions. ISBN 978-1-98-854280-5 (3rd edition)
- Sally Murray; Nuttall, Jocelyn Grace; Jane Mitchell (2008). "Research into initial teacher education in Australia: A survey of the literature 1995–2004". Teaching and Teacher Education. 24 (1): 225–239. doi:10.1016/j.tate.2007.01.013. Wikidata Q125455466.
- Nuttall, Jocelyn Grace; Edwards, Susan; Ana Mantilla; Sue Grieshaber; Elizabeth Wood (2015). "The role of motive objects in early childhood teacher development concerning children's digital play and play-based learning in early childhood curricula". Journal of In-Service Education. 41 (2): 222–235. doi:10.1080/19415257.2014.990579. Wikidata Q125455450.
- Kate Ord; Nuttall, Jocelyn Grace (2016). "Bodies of knowledge: The concept of embodiment as an alternative to theory/practice debates in the preparation of teachers". Teaching and Teacher Education. 60: 355–362. doi:10.1016/j.tate.2016.05.019. Wikidata Q125455435.
- Ali Formen; Nuttall, Jocelyn Grace (2014). "Tensions Between Discourses of Development, Religion, and Human Capital in Early Childhood Education Policy Texts: The Case of Indonesia". International Journal of Early Childhood. 46 (1): 15–31. doi:10.1007/s13158-013-0097-y. Wikidata Q125455459.
- Yrjö Engeström; Nuttall, Jocelyn Grace; Nick Hopwood (2020). "Transformative agency by double stimulation: advances in theory and methodology". Pedagogy Culture and Society. 30 (1): 1–7. doi:10.1080/14681366.2020.1805499. Wikidata Q125455413.
- Nuttall, Jocelyn Grace; Sally Murray; Terri Seddon; Jane Mitchell (2006). "Changing Research Contexts in Teacher Education in Australia: Charting new directions". Asia-Pacific Journal of Teacher Education. 34 (3): 321–332. doi:10.1080/13598660600927224. Wikidata Q125455470.
