= Graham Nuthall =

New Zealand academic

Graham Nuthall MNZM
- Born: Graham Alfred Nuthall; 28 April 1935; Christchurch, New Zealand
- Died: 28 July 2004 (aged 69); Christchurch, New Zealand
- Education: University of Illinois
- Spouse: Jill Nuthall (m. 1956)
- Awards: Herbison Lecture; McKenzie Award
- Scientific career
- Fields: Educational research
- Workplaces: University of Canterbury
- Thesis: Experimental comparison of instructional strategies in the teaching of concepts (1966)

Graham Alfred Nuthall MNZM (28 April 1935 – 28 July 2004) was a New Zealand educationist. An academic at the University of Canterbury and a pioneering researcher into teaching and learning in the classroom, he is recognised as the creator of the longest-running and most elaborate studies of how children learn in a classroom setting. His posthumously published 2007 book The Hidden Lives of Learners is considered an influential text for teachers and education researchers.

== Biography ==
Born in Christchurch, New Zealand, on 28 April 1935, Nuthall was educated at Elmwood School, Cathedral Grammar School, and Christ's College. He married his wife Jill in 1956. Nuthall enrolled simultaneously in Christchurch Teachers' College, where he trained as a primary school teacher and speech-language therapist, graduating in 1958, and at the University of Canterbury where he studied education, graduating with a Bachelor of Arts degree in 1959. He went on to complete a Master of Arts (Honours) degree at Canterbury with a thesis entitled Analysis of teaching and pupil thinking in the classroom in 1962.

In 2002, a year after his retirement, Nuthall was diagnosed with leukemia, and he died in Christchurch on 28 July 2004 at the age of 69. He was survived by his wife, Jill Nuthall.

== Academic career ==
In 1960, Nuthall was appointed assistant lecturer in education at the University of Canterbury, until in 1963 he was awarded a Fulbright Scholarship to the University of Illinois. He took his wife and four children to the US, supporting them on his pay as a research assistant while he worked on his PhD in education and psychology. He finished in 2½ years, graduating in 1966 with a doctoral thesis titled Experimental comparison of instructional strategies in the teaching of concepts. Despite offers from other countries, he returned to New Zealand and a lecturer's position at the University of Canterbury. Nuthall's association with the University of Canterbury lasted over 40 years: he attained the rank of full professor in 1971 at the age of 37; took on the role of head of the Education Department in 1976, from 1980 to 1986, and again in 1996; became professor emeritus in 2000; and retired in 2001.

Throughout his career, Nuthall made two or three trips overseas each year, including research fellowhips at the Rockefeller Foundation's Bellagio Center in Italy and the Center for Advanced Study in the Behavioral Sciences at Stanford, a visiting scholar position at Stanford, and a role with the American Educational Research Association.

== Research ==
Nuthall's research focus was on the relationship between teachers and their students in a classroom setting, and he studied the particular and subtle interactions that influenced individual learning. At the beginning of his research career, Nuthall was impatient with much educational theory, which at the time was not backed up by data, and he resolved to gather empirical evidence of how learning worked from the point of view of the child.

This involved ongoing work with children in actual classroom settings, rather than in a university laboratory, which won him the respect of teachers. Nurhall describes his first research project, in 1960:

The journey began when I was a graduate student and persuaded a group of experienced teachers to let me bring a tape-recorder into their classrooms and hang up microphones...from their light-fittings. I borrowed [his wife Jill's] bike with the cane basket on the front to carry the heavy Phillips tape-recorder and all the wires and bits of string that I needed to record in the classrooms of long-suffering teachers.

Nuthall pioneered the use and analysis of audio recordings of children in the classroom. This began when he was still a student in 1960, when he was given permission by teachers to record their lessons and their interactions with pupils. What seemed to be spontaneous conversation turned out be a social interaction operating according to a predictable set of rules, which later studies revealed were operating much the same way in New Zealand, Japan, and the United States. Nuthall called these "ritualized routines", necessary for managing a classroom of 30 children, but obscuring the actual experience of each learner. As he put it in a 2004 lecture:

Staff at the university lecture to students because that is what lecturers do. Primary school teachers have lively discussions with their pupils because that is what primary school teachers do. Secondary school teachers write notes on the blackboard, set homework, and send their pupils on their way every 50 minutes or so, because that is what high school teaching is about.

Nuthall's focus on the experience of children gave results at odds with the findings of other researchers, who focussed on the actions of teachers. From 1968 to 1974, Nuthall and his graduate students attempted to determine the role of teacher experience and training in learning. Using scripted lessons about black-backed gulls, and intensively monitoring all classroom interactions, they compared three groups: teacher trainees, experienced teachers, and trainees who were analysing their teaching through recordings. By 1974, they had determined that the way a teacher questioned students and gave feedback was far more important than their training and experience.

Adrienne Alton-Lee's PhD work in 1978 attempted an even more detailed study of the learning process in three students, recording every 15 seconds each action and communication, and photographing everything they made or wrote down. Nuthall credits this methodology as the breakthrough that would shape the next 20 years of his research. He designed follow-up studies based on Alton-Lee's work with larger groups using more sophisticated recording technology. They discovered that teacher-led public discussion was only one component of the classroom experience, and student self-talk and interaction with peers was mostly invisible to the teacher, often missed even by the observers. Nuthall's conclusion was that the majority of student learning is based on self talk or thinking out loud, peer interaction (25% of learning) or self-initiated wrestling with the course material, rather than coming from the teacher and the textbook.

Nuthall then attempted to map the learning process of a single student, gradually building up to larger groups and whole classes, to determine which factors were associated with learning. He and his colleagues discovered that encountering the underlying information behind an idea three times—the "three times" rule—was the best predictor of success, outweighing measures of ability or intelligence. Nuthall discovered that "more able" and "less able" students were using fundamentally the same processes in learning, despite their differing success, and concluded that what we call "ability" may just be a consequence rather than a cause of increasing success. The most successful students were those with the metacognitive skills to realise how to take get the most out of classroom lessons: "so-called differences in ability are not about how pupils learn, but are the result of the ways they manage their participation in classroom activities".

Nuthall's research on the critical role of working memory in students Is considered significant in the field; Baljit Kaur wrote in 2006 in a special issue of the journal Teaching and Teacher Education on the work of Graham Nuthall:

[Nuthall's] highly accurate prediction of what a student will or will not learn based on content, sequence and timing of what the student had encountered stands as an unparalleled finding in teaching and learning research.

== The Hidden Lives of Learners ==
Nuthall's 2007 book, with cover art from one of his own paintings

Nuthall's most influential publication was his book The Hidden Lives of Learners, published posthumously in 2007. Nuthall wrote the book in haste at the end of his life, to summarise his 40-year career in educational research, and it was compiled and published after his death by his wife and colleagues. Nuthall's main conclusions were:

1. Standardised testing is no more reliable at assessing learning than an interview with a student
2. Course concepts need to be repeated in different ways—the "three timesʻ rule
3. Learners need time to master concepts, and mastery is not necessarily related to ability
4. Teachers also need time: to assess the social processes at work in the classroom, pre-test their students, and design rich lessons
5. Teaching should take into account how memory actually works.

"It is assumed that learning is the more or less automatic result of engaging in classroom activities. If students do what the teacher expects of them, follow the instructions carefully, complete all the aspects of the tasks, then the students will learn what the teacher expects....However our research shows that almost none of this is true." (The Hidden Lives of Learners, pp 103–104)

The Hidden Lives of Learners is still an important text for trainee teachers on how the personal context and social interactions of students affect their learning.

== Selected works ==
- Nuthall, G. (1966). Experimental comparison of instructional strategies in the teaching of concepts (PhD dissertation). University of Illinois at Urbana-Champaign.
- Wright, C. J. and Nuthall, G. (1970): "Relationships between teacher behaviours and pupil achievement in three experimental elementary science lessons". American Educational Research Journal. 7(4): 477–491
- Nuthall, G. and Alton-Lee, A. (1993): "Predicting learning from student experience of teaching: a theory of student knowledge construction in classrooms". American Educational Research Journal. 30(4): 799–840
- Nuthall, G. (1999). "The way students learn: acquiring knowledge from an integrated science and social studies unit". Elementary School Journal. 99(4): 303–341
- Nuthall, G. (1999): "How students learn: The validation of a model of knowledge using stimulated recall of the learning process." Paper presented at the Annual Meeting of the American Educational Research Association, 19–23 April 1999.
- Nuthall, G. (2002): "The Cultural Myths and the Realities of Teaching and Learning". New Zealand Annual Review of Education. 11: 5–30
- Nuthall, G. (2004): "Relating classroom teaching to student learning: a critical analysis of why research has failed to bridge the theory-practice gap". Harvard Educational Review. 74(3): 273–306.
- Nuthall, G. (2005): "The Cultural Myths and Realities of Classroom Teaching and Learning: A Personal Journey". Teachers College Record. 107(5): 895–934
- Nuthall, G. (2007): The Hidden Lives of Learners. Wellington: NZCER Press. ISBN 978-1-877-39824-7
- Nuthall, G. (2012): "Understanding What Students Learn" in Kaur, Baljit (2012). Understanding teaching and learning: classroom research revisited. Rotterdam Boston: SensePublishers. ISBN 978-94-6091-864-3.

== Honours and awards ==
Nuthall received a New Zealand Science and Technology Medal from the Royal Society of New Zealand. In 2000, he received a Mackenzie Award, a lifetime achievement award for his work in education research and teacher training from the New Zealand Association for Research in Education, and in December 2001 was invited to present the Herbison Lecture at their annual conference, where he received a standing ovation for his talk "The cultural myths and the realities of teaching and learning".

In the 2003 Queen's Birthday Honours, Nuthall was appointed a Member of the New Zealand Order of Merit, for services to education. In 2003, the University of Canterbury instituted a Graham Nuthall Award for education research, and in 2004 a series of Graham Nuthall annual lectures (Nuthall himself delivered the inaugural one). The university also launched the Graham Nuthall Classroom Research Trust in May 2004 to carry on Nuthall's legacy. In 2025, the lecture series was relaunched as the annual Hui Rangahau Graham Nuthall Research Symposium.
