= He Kōrero: Words Between Us; First Māori–Pākehā Conversations on Paper =

Book published in 2011

- Author: Alison Jones, Kuni Jenkins
- Cover artist: Sam Bunny
- Language: English
- Genre: Non-fiction
- Publisher: Huia Publishers
- Publication date: 2011
- ISBN: 978-1-86969-478-4

He Kōrero: Words Between Us; First Māori–Pakeha Conversations on Paper is a 2011 book by Alison Jones and Kuni Jenkins. The book covers early encounters of Māori people with writing, from 1769 through to 1826. The book was awarded a design award, a higher education book award and a Māori non-fiction award, and was listed as one of the 180 most important works of Māori-authored non-fiction.

== Content ==
The book came from research funded by the Marsden Fund and carried out by Jones and Jenkins, into Māori people's early encounters with writing. The research covered early Māori writing and the two-way teaching and learning relationships between Māori and Pākehā from 1769 to 1826. The book is structured in 16 chapters where Jenkins and Jones wrote about 16 'different textual artefacts or groups of artifacts' they encountered at various archives and libraries. An example is a letter to the chief of Rangihoua pā, Ruatara, in 1814 by Samuel Marsden. There are many images of handwriting and drawing throughout the chapters. A short conclusion forms chapter 17.

== Recognition ==
The book was favourably received. Historian Vincent O'Malley said the book was "a lively, well-written and impressively researched book that deserves a wide readership". In 2012 He Kōrero was awarded the Publishers Association of New Zealand design award with the judges describing it as having "attractive, evocative images. You can almost hear the scratching of quill on paper." It was also awarded the CLNZ Best Book in Higher Education Publishing award in the same year, with the judges commenting that the book was "of huge national importance". It also won the award for Te Kōrero Pono – Non-fiction at Massey University's Ngā Kupu Ora Māori Book Awards. The research work also formed the basis of an exhibition.

In 2025 He Kōrero was listed as one of the 180 most significant works of Māori-authored non-fiction through inclusion in Books of Mana. Academics Jacinta Ruru, Angela Wanhalla and Jeannette Wikaira said "the book deepens our understanding of the two-way teaching and learning relationships that existed between Māori and Pākeha of the time."
