= Jessica Hutchings =

New Zealand researcher and author

Jessica Hutchings is a New Zealand researcher, author, and Ashtanga Yoga teacher. Hutchings' work is grounded in kaupapa Māori research (research informed by tikanga Māori) within the subject areas of environmental and Indigenous studies.

== Career ==
Hutchings completed a PhD in environmental studies and completed a post-doctoral fellowship in Māori health research. She was the Director Māori, Tumu Whakarae of the Building Better Homes Towns and Cities National Science Challenge from 2018–2021 leading a Māori research programme in the Challenge. Hutchings is also a member of the MBIE Science Board.

She cited the New Zealand COVID-19 lockdown as encouraging wider conversation and action around food sovereignty, saying "Since the Covid lockdown, it’s just been right at the forefront of everything… We’re right on conversations around what food security is, we’re beginning to have conversations as whanau Māori."

Along with Victoria University associate Jo Smith (Kāi Tahu, Kāti Māmoe, Waitaha) Hutchings founded Papawhakaritorito Charitable Trust, which focuses on food sovereignty education and research, and includes food growing initiatives such as Feed The Whānau.

Jessica Hutchings participated in the development and research for Hua Parakore, the organic food production verification system used by Te Waka Kai Ora (The Māori Organics Authority of Aotearoa, New Zealand).

== Recognition ==
- 2016 Māori Book Awards, Te Kōrero Pono - Non-Fiction Winner for Te Mahi Mara Hua Parakore: A Maori Food Sovereignty Handbook

== Personal life ==
From Ngāi Tahu, Gujarati, and Ngāti Huirapa descent, Hutchings' work primarily focuses on Māori food sovereignty and decolonization.

== Selected works ==
=== Publications ===
- Hutchings, Jessica (2015). Te mahi māra hua parakore : a Māori food sovereignty handbook. Ōtaki, Aotearoa New Zealand. ISBN 978-0-473-31653-2. OCLC 922882036.
- Decolonisation in Aotearoa : education, research and practice. Jessica Hutchings, Jenny Lee-Morgan, New Zealand Council for Educational Research. Wellington, New Zealand. 2016. ISBN 978-0-947509-44-6. OCLC 1003123668.
- Te ahu o te reo Māori : reflecting on research to understand the well-being of te reo Māori. Vincent Olsen-Reeder, Rawinia Higgins, Jessica Hutchings. Wellington. 2017. ISBN 978-1-77656-174-2. OCLC 1018473046.
- Te Mahi Oneone Hua Parakore: A Māori soil sovereignty and wellbeing handbook. Jessica Hutchings, Jo Smith. Christchurch, New Zealand. 2020. ISBN 978-0-473-51619-2. OCLC 1162219778.

=== Filmed Lectures and Documentaries ===
- Hua Parakore: A kaupapa Māori pathway for Maori soil and food sovereignty. Toi Tangata, 2021. New Zealand.
- Hua Parakore: Living Indigenous Food Sovereignty. Happen Films, 2021. New Zealand.
