= Journal of Research in Special Educational Needs =

Journal of Research in Special Education Needs
- Discipline: Education
- Language: English
- Edited by: Sue Ralph

Publication details
- History: 2001-present
- Publisher: Wiley-Blackwell on behalf of the National Association for Special Educational Needs
- Frequency: Triannually

Standard abbreviations
- ISO 4: J. Res. Spec. Educ. Needs

Indexing
- ISSN: 1471-3802 (print); 1471-3802 (web)

Links
- Journal homepage; Online access; Online archive

Journal of Research in Special Education Needs is a peer-reviewed academic journal published thrice annually by Wiley-Blackwell on behalf of the National Association for Special Educational Needs. The journal was established in 2001 and covers research on special education needs.
