= Cathy Nutbrown =

British educational academic

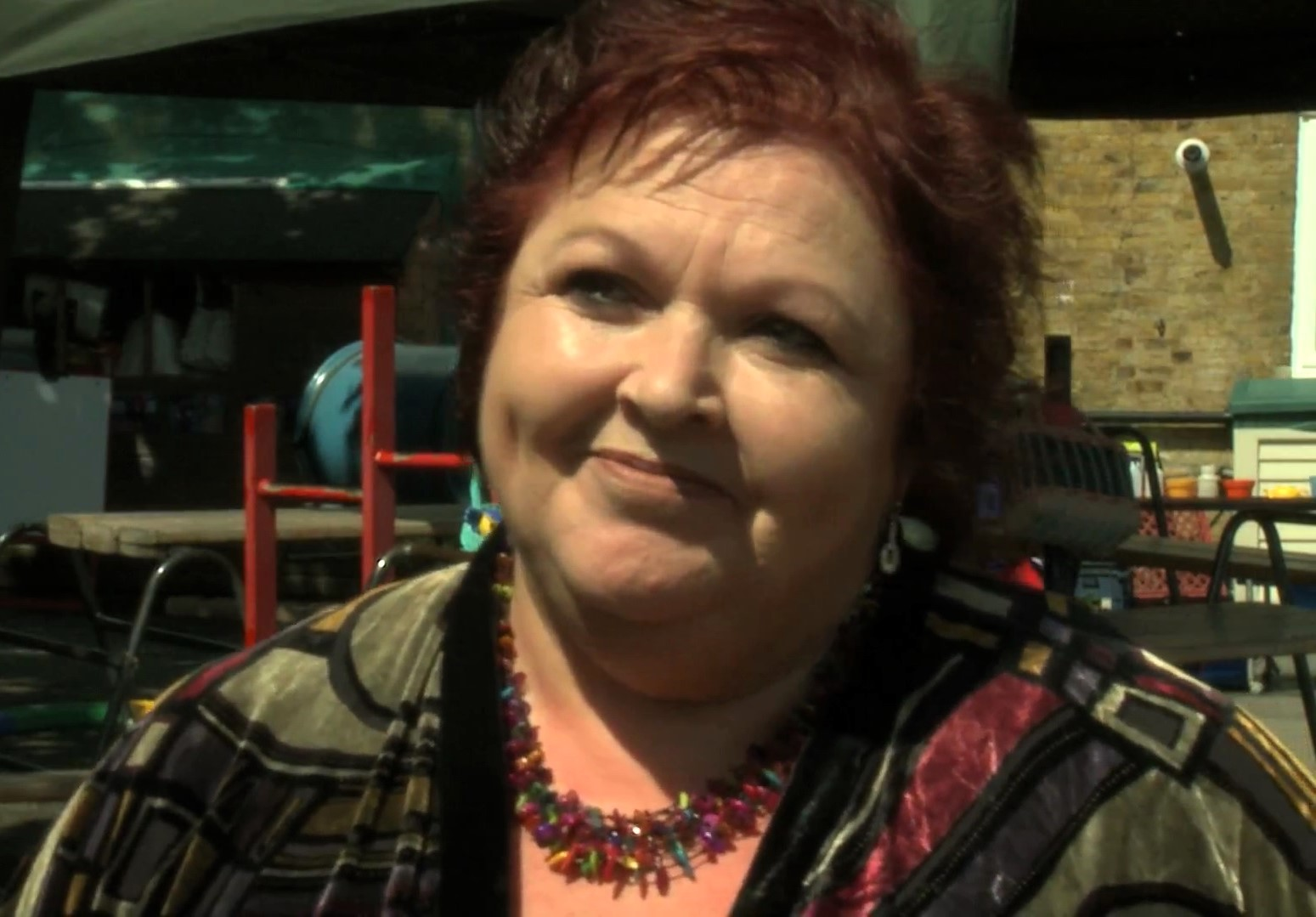
Nutbrown in 2012

Dame Cathryn Elizabeth Nutbrown DBE is a British early childhood education academic and a professor at the University of Sheffield. She was the key contributor to a report which suggested that the enforcement of qualifications for vocational courses in early childhood education were laxer than in animal care. In 2020, the Sutton Trust described it as a "landmark paper" and reported that at least twelve of its nineteen recommendations had not been achieved.

Nutbrown was appointed a Dame Commander of the Order of the British Empire in the 2023 New Year Honours for services to early childhood education.

== Career ==
I want to thank colleagues for their involvement and sustained collaboration over several decades. Working with so many committed professionals around the country who work with families to enhance their young children's early learning is a great privilege.

— Nutbrown, discussing the investiture of her damehood with Nursery World.

Nutbrown spent some time working in early childhood education. Nutbrown received her PhD from the University of Sheffield in 1997 with her thesis "The assessment of early literacy development". She became a professor at their School of Education and established early childhood education programmes for Master of Arts degrees (in 1998) and doctorates (in 2008). She became president of Early Education, a professional association and charity.

As an academic, Nutbrown specializes in early childhood education. Nutbrown serves at the editor-in-chief of the Journal of Early Childhood Research. Nutbrown was a non-panel reference group member for Clare Tickell's 2011 Department for Education report on the early years foundation stage.

Nutbrown was the leading researcher of the Nutbrown Review, a 2012 Department for Education report on job qualifications within the field of childcare and early education. A March 2012 preliminary version of the Review concluded that such qualifications were poorly enforced, and among its findings were qualifications for vocational courses in those fields being laxer than in animal care; the poor quality of vocational courses for these jobs; and a lack of scrutiny towards employees' proficiency in English and mathematics. Early childhood education magazine Nursery World described her report as "influential" and described Nutbrown herself as "renowned in the sector for leading a review into early years qualifications". In 2020, the Sutton Trust described the Nutbrown Review as a "landmark paper" and reported that at least twelve of its nineteen recommendations had not been achieved.

In 2013, she won the Economic and Social Research Council's Celebrating Impact Prize for "Outstanding impact in society", for her project "Helping parents with children’s literacy", and the Nursery World Lifetime Achievement Award.

Nutbrown was appointed a Dame Commander of the Order of the British Empire in the 2023 New Year Honours for services to early childhood education.

== Works ==
- Threads of Thinking: Young Children Learning and the Role of Early Education (1994)
- (ed.) Research Studies in Early Childhood Education (2002)
- (ed. with Kath Hirst) Perspectives on Early Childhood Education (2005)
- (with Julie Brierley) Understanding Schematic Learning at Two (2017)
