= Te Aue Davis =

New Zealand Māori weaver

Te Aue Takotoroa Davis CNZM OBE JP (1 September 1925 – 28 November 2010), also known as Daisy Davis, was a key figure in the Māori renaissance in the field of weaving. Born and raised near her ancestral marae Tokikapu in Waitomo, of Ngati Uekaha and Maniapoto descent, she received early grants from the Council for Maori and Pacific Arts and Department of Labour to fund her work.

Davis worked in the conservation of te Reo as a taonga, for the Department of Survey and Land Information. She worked on a Polynesian language oral history map that traced migration routes across the Pacific through the naming of places, plants and animals. She was also a member of the Cultural Conservation Advisory Council (a council that existed from 1987–1991 to "guide and facilitate collection conservation and the training of personnel through funding allocation and the provision of policy advice").

Davis never formally learned to weave, but said "you retain what you learn when you learn through working with the material. My interest started with one or two of our own family cloaks. Then from that came the realisation that there were a whole lot of fibre things that needed restoration, particularly on marae, such as the whariki and old kete that people hold dear."

A rain cape made by Davis in the collection of Te Papa was worn by the Crown Princess Masako of Japan on a visit to New Zealand in 2002.

Davis and Rānui Ngārimu, with the assistance of Jane Morgan, Kelly Walker, Iri Morunga and Delphina Te Tai, wove Te Māhutonga (the Southern Cross). Te Māhutonga is the cloak worn by the flag bearer of the New Zealand Olympic team. It took over seven months to make and includes kiwi, tīeke (saddleback), toroa (albatross) and kākāpō. Te Māhutonga was named by Dame Te Atairangikaahu.

In 1990, Davis was awarded the New Zealand 1990 Commemoration Medal, and in the 1993 Queen's Birthday Honours, she was appointed an Officer of the Order of the British Empire, for services to weaving and the community. In the 2005 Queen's Birthday Honours, she was appointed a Companion of the New Zealand Order of Merit, for services to New Zealand's heritage.

In 1986, she was awarded the inaugural Te Waka Toi supreme award, and in 2011 she was posthumously conferred an honorary Doctorate of Letters by the University of Canterbury.
