= Hokimate Harwood =

New Zealand Māori biologist and curator

Hokimate Pamela Harwood is a bicultural science researcher at Te Papa, New Zealand's national museum. She uses a background in biology and traditional Māori knowledge (Mātauranga Māori) to research historical Māori textiles.

== Biography ==
Harwood attended secondary school at the Catholic Regional College in Traralgon in Victoria, Australia. She then completed a Bachelor of Science degree in Biological Sciences and Physical Anthropology at the University of Auckland in New Zealand, graduating in 1998. In 2002, she completed a Master’s degree in Environmental and Marine science, also at the University of Auckland. Her thesis research analyzed the tree fruit diet of New Zealand’s pigeon population (also known as kūkupa or kererū) in the urban environment of North Shore.

Harwood's research at Te Papa focuses on the feathers in traditional Māori feather cloaks (kahu huruhuru). She developed a technique which uses microscopic photography to identify the bird species and geographic origin of feathers used in cloaks. She has identified the feathers in all of the cloaks in Te Papa's collection.

In 2019, Harwood was involved with the study of Te Rā, the sole remaining customary Māori sail, which is held in the collection of the British Museum in London. She was able to identify which species of birds the feathers in the sail were from.

== Personal life ==
Harwood is a member of the Ngāpuhi tribe (iwi).
