= Support for Learning =

Special education journal

- Discipline: Education
- Language: English

Publication details
- History: 1986-present
- Publisher: Wiley-Blackwell on behalf of NASEN
- Frequency: Quarterly

Standard abbreviations
- ISO 4: Support Learn.

Indexing
- ISSN: 0268-2141 (print); 1467-9604 (web)
- LCCN: 87642827
- OCLC no.: 644836296

Links
- Journal homepage; Online access; Online archive

Support for Learning is a quarterly peer-reviewed academic journal published by Wiley-Blackwell on behalf of NASEN. The journal was established in 1986 and covers the field of special education as it relates to mainstream schools. Topics of note include the relationship between theory, research and practice, curriculum development and delivery, and classroom management.
