= Jane Gilbert (educationalist) =

New Zealand educator and Chief Researcher for the NZCER (born 1955)

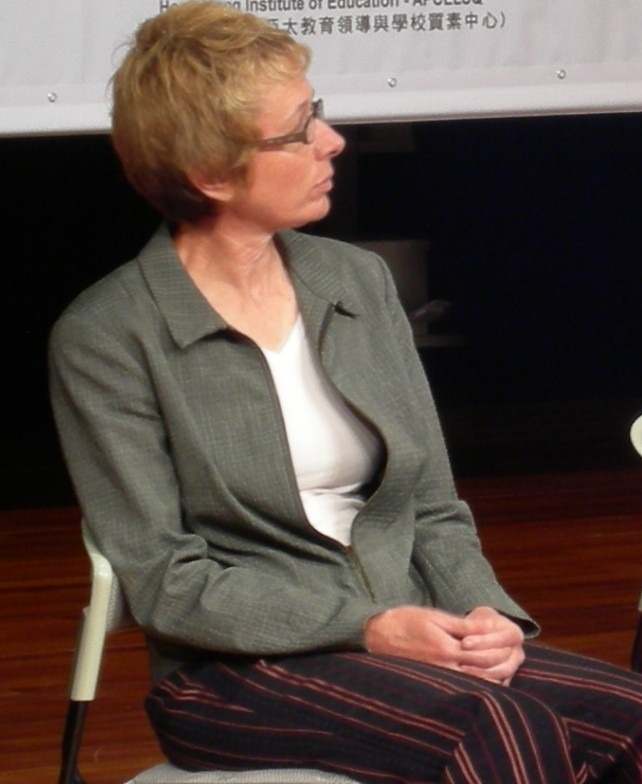
- Gilbert presenting the education reform in New Zealand at APERA2006
- Born: 1955 (age 70–71)
- Education: University of Waikato
- Scientific career
- Workplaces: New Zealand Council for Educational Research, Victoria University of Wellington, University of Waikato
- Thesis: Thinking `other-wise' : re-thinking the problem of girls and science education in the post-modern (1997)

Dr. Jane Gilbert (born 1955) is an educationalist in New Zealand. She was the Chief Researcher of New Zealand Council for Educational Research. From 2014, Jane was appointed as a professor of education at Auckland University of Technology.

== Biography ==
Jane Gilbert was a qualified teacher in Wellington, New Zealand. She had a Diploma in Teaching English as a second language (TESL), but she taught science and biology in a local secondary school for 10 years. After that, she focused on educational research. She worked in the School of Education at the University of Waikato at Hamilton, New Zealand. Then, she became a Senior Lecturer in the School of Education at Victoria University of Wellington in New Zealand. In June 2003, she joined the New Zealand Council for Educational Research as a Senior Researcher and then the Chief Researcher. Her research focuses on the following areas:

- curriculum development (especially in science and technology) in secondary schools and tertiary institutions
- gender equity issues in education
- language and literacy issues in education (for example, ESOL issues and Māori education in New Zealand)
- educational philosophy and sociology.
- implications of the Knowledge Society for contemporary public education

In November 2006, she presented a speech about educational reform in New Zealand, and commented about why educational reform failed in most schools. She also mentioned about the adaptation required to current curriculum in order to fit the future/current Information Society. For example, moving towards integrated curriculum to promote thinking across subjects, as compared to traditional subjects/disciplines as practised in most countries like UK and US.

== Selected works ==
- Catching the knowledge wave? : the knowledge society and the future of education, 2005
- Educational issues for communities affected by transience and residential mobility : report on phase 1 (2003-2004), 2005
- Engaging women and girls in science : reconfiguring science, science education, and gender for the knowledge age, 2001
- Exploring teacher professional learning for future-oriented schooling, 2014
- On the edge : shifting teachers' paradigms for the future, 2015
