= British Journal of Special Education =

- Discipline: Special education
- Language: English
- Edited by: Graham Hallett, Fiona Hallett

Publication details
- History: 1974-Present
- Publisher: Wiley-Blackwell on behalf of the National Association for Special Educational Needs
- Frequency: Quarterly

Standard abbreviations
- ISO 4: Br. J. Spec. Educ.

Indexing
- ISSN: 0952-3383 (print); 1467-8578 (web)

Links
- Journal homepage; Online access; Online archive

British Journal of Special Education is a quarterly peer-reviewed academic journal published by Wiley-Blackwell on behalf of the National Association for Special Educational Needs. The journal was established in 1974 and covers research on special education needs at the pre-school, school, and post-school levels.
