= Journal of Early Childhood Research =

- Language: English
- Edited by: Cathy Nutbrown

Publication details
- History: 2003-present
- Publisher: SAGE Publications
- Frequency: Triannually

Standard abbreviations
- ISO 4: J. Early Child. Res.

Indexing
- ISSN: 1476-718X (print); 1741-2927 (web)
- LCCN: 2003243413
- OCLC no.: 808985071

Links
- Journal homepage; Online access; Online archive

The Journal of Early Childhood Research is a triannual peer-reviewed academic journal that covers research on child health, early education, pediatrics, psychology, social work, sociology, and teaching in early childhood. The editor-in-chief is Cathy Nutbrown (University of Sheffield). It was established in 2003 and is currently published by SAGE Publications.

== Abstracting and indexing ==
The Journal of Early Childhood Research is abstracted and indexed in:

- British Education Index
- Current Contents/Social and Behavioral Sciences
- Educational Research Abstracts Online
- Family Index Database
- Social Sciences Citation Index
