= Geraldine McDonald =

New Zealand academic and educator (1926–2018)

Geraldine McDonald CNZM
- Born: Geraldine Player; 13 May 1926; Wellington, New Zealand
- Died: 26 November 2018 (aged 92); Wellington, New Zealand
- Occupations: Academic; teacher
- Children: 3

Academic background
- Education: PhD in education, Victoria University of Wellington, 1976

Academic work
- Discipline: Education
- Sub-discipline: Pre-school education
- Institutions: New Zealand Council for Educational Research

Geraldine McDonald CNZM (née Player; 13 May 1926 – 26 November 2018) was a New Zealand academic and teacher. She was a pioneer of research into women's education and early childhood education, and advocated for women and girls throughout her life. After an early teaching career, she completed her doctoral thesis on the development of preschool-aged Māori children, and began working for the New Zealand Council for Educational Research. Throughout her later career she ran and chaired various organisations including the New Zealand Mental Health Foundation and the New Zealand Association for Research in Education, and was influential in government policy on early childhood education.

== Early life, career and family ==
McDonald was born in Wellington on 13 May 1926. Her mother, Alma (née Fuller), was a clerical worker and her father, Gerald Player, was a public servant. She attended Hataitai School, where she was dux in her final year, and subsequently Wellington East Girls' College. Her first year at the college was 1939 and coincided with the outbreak of the Second World War. Her father committed suicide when she was 13, which meant McDonald and her mother had to live with her terminally ill aunt. In order to escape from her stressful home life she started at Dunedin Teachers' College at age 16.

While studying at college McDonald encountered the work of Susan Sutherland Isaacs and became interested in the idea of studying human behaviour. After graduating she taught the subject of clothing at Hutt Valley Memorial Technical College and studied part-time at Victoria University of Wellington, starting in 1944. She said that when she started university "young women just weren't taken seriously", and that women "were just at university to fill in time before marriage and to find someone to marry". In 1948 she completed her Bachelor of Arts and married; she then moved to London with her husband for three years, where she taught in secondary schools. She and her husband had three children together. As a young mother, she became involved with the Kelburn Playcentre, where she developed her advocacy skills and eventually took on national leadership roles for Playcentre.

== Postgraduate studies: 1960s–1970s ==
In 1959 she published a textbook, You and Your Clothes, for the School Certificate course on clothing and textiles. The family spent three years in Indonesia in the early 1960s as part of the Colombo Plan. On their return she was the assistant principal at the Wellington Free Kindergarten Teachers' College for a period, but decided she would like to return to academia.

In 1969 McDonald obtained her master's degree with distinction, based on her study of playcentres in Wainuiomata, and developed an interest in Māori culture and the involvement of women in their children's education. In her review of the literature on preschool education, she noted that "only one paper on the subject had been written and published in a book about education in New Zealand". She received a QEII Postgraduate Fellowship and in 1976 completed her PhD. Her thesis focussed on the language of preschool-aged Māori children, and involved fieldwork in areas of New Zealand where te reo Māori was widely spoken, working with other notable women in this field like Iritana Tāwhiwhirangi and Rose Pere. Her marriage ended around this time.

While working on her studies she published the books Māori Mothers and Preschool Education (1973) and An Early Wellington Kindergarten (1975), both of which are still used by teachers and researchers today. At the time she began to focus on women's education in the mid-1960s, she said "there were no courses on women’s studies and there was so little recognition of the validity of research on women that women seldom appeared in the indexes of books on education or were distinguished in research samples". During her doctorate studies she joined an association for women on the university staff, which was working towards the promotion of women's studies and ensuring childcare was available for female staff and students. McDonald's work also contributed to Māori educational studies in a number of ways, including by criticising previous categorisation of Māori based on genetic calculations ("full-blooded", "half-caste") rather than by self-identification, and the categorisation of Māori communities as rural or urban without any analysis of the way Māori people actually lived: for example in family communities on tribal land. She advocated for Māori self-determination and autonomy in pre-school education.

== Advocacy work and later research: 1970s–1980s ==
In 1973 she joined the New Zealand Council for Educational Research (NZCER) as a research officer. She was the founding director of its Early Childhood Unit in 1974 and continued her research work into preschool education and the education of women and girls. In 1975, International Women's Year, she was part of the Committee on Women which advised the government on matters concerning women. In the same year she helped organise the Education and Equality of the Sexes Conference for the Department of Education. From 1977 to 1992 she was NZCER's assistant director. In 1979 she was the founding president of the New Zealand Association for Research in Education. She was also an active member in this period of the New Zealand Women's Studies Association. In 1985 she said, at the Early Childhood Forum held at the New Zealand Parliament, that the forum was about "wanting a share of the cake, needing a larger cake, but actually getting crumbs and leftovers".

From 1977 to 1980, she was the chairperson of the State Services Commission working group for childcare. The group recommended that the government fund a greater proportion of childcare costs, but the recommendation was ignored by the government of the time. In the 1980s she created four "Joining In" workbooks about the involvement of disabled children in early childhood education. In 1979 she became a board member of the New Zealand Mental Health Foundation and in 1986 she was elected chairperson. In 1981 she was the recipient of a Fulbright–Hays Award and went to Columbia University as a research scholar, and in 1984 she joined the board of the New Zealand/US Fulbright Program.

== Later life: 1990s onwards ==
In the 1990s she was the chairperson of the Future Directions Early Childhood Education Project, and the recommendations of this group were adopted by the Labour Party when it later came to power. In 1992 she retired from NZCER, but continued to work as a consultant and undertook some part-time lecturing at Wellington Teachers' College and Victoria University. In later years she became interested in the Flynn effect and argued that it could be explained by changes in children's ages at levels of schooling. In 2000 she acted as an expert witness for a sex discrimination case in Hong Kong.

In 1993 she received an honorary doctorate in literature from Victoria University. In 1994 she was made an honorary fellow of the New Zealand Educational Institute. In the 1997 New Year Honours, she was appointed a Companion of the New Zealand Order of Merit, for services to educational research. McDonald was twice selected to give the Herbison Lecture, first in 1993 and again in 2006.
