= Te Rā (sail) =

Historic Māori sail

Te Rā is the name given to the only surviving traditional Māori sail. She is over 4 m (13 ft) long, and is made of harakeke (New Zealand flax) and edged in feathers from native bird species. She is thought to have been collected between 1769 and 1771 by British explorer Captain James Cook, but this has not been verified. Te Rā has been part of the British Museum's collection for 200 years; in 2023, she returned to New Zealand on loan.

== History ==
Te Rā is the only known traditional Māori sail. She is thought to have been collected between 1769 and 1771 by Captain James Cook on his first voyage to New Zealand, but this has not been confirmed. (Note: The only documentation associated with the sail is an 1898 registration slip, which states the sail was found in the museum collection at that time.) The sail has been held by the British Museum for around 200 years.

The sail was the subject of a three-year Marsden grant-funded project, beginning in 2017, to systematically study and analyse the materials and construction techniques used to shed light on how Māori sailed.

=== Display ===
She was exhibited briefly in 1998. In 2023, Te Rā returned to New Zealand on long-term loan. She was displayed in the Christchurch Art Gallery from 8 July until 23 October. She was on display in the Auckland War Memorial Museum from 18 November 2023 until 17 August 2025, alongside two sibling sails: a small-scale replica, Hine Mārama, and a full-size replica, Māhere Tū ki te Rangi.

== Materials and construction ==
The sail is triangular, 440 cm (14.4 ft) long and 139 cm (4.56 ft) wide at the top; the rectangular streamer is 105 cm (3.44 ft) long. Te Rā is made up of 13 panels woven from strips of harakeke (New Zealand flax). The panels are joined using a reinforced triple-weave join rarely used today called a hiki or hono. Openwork zig-zags (named awamatangi meaning "pathways of the wind") run up the length of the sail, allowing strong winds to blow into the sail without breaking it.

The top of the sail and the streamer are edged with wing feathers from kāhu (swamp harrier) and kererū (wood pigeon). The red feathers around the loops on the outer edge are from the underwing of kākā; two of the loops have traces of kurī (dog) hair.
