= New Zealand Association for Research in Education =

New Zealand Association for Research in Education (NZARE) was established in December 1979 and its membership consists of individuals and organisations with an interest in educational research. The current president is Professor Colin Gibbs, Head of the School of Education at Auckland University of Technology.

== National/international organisation ==
NZARE has established formal international links with the British Educational Research Association, American Educational Research Association, the Canadian Society for the Study of Education and Australian Educational Research Association.

NZARE organises an annual conferences and occasional seminars and workshops where participants share research and engage debate.

NZARE's newsletter is Input (He Pātaka Tuku Kōrero ).

NZARE has established caucuses to promote and serve the interests of Māori, Pasifika researchers and emerging researchers; Special Interest Groups are formed at the request of members in a range of topics.

== Awards ==
The NZARE gives a number of awards.

- The Judith Duncan Award for Early Childhood Research to a member "who has made notable contributions to the field of early childhood education and care through the conduct of high-quality research".
- The Herbison Lecture at the annual conference is an invited presentation, given in honour of Jean Herbison. (Notable winners listed on Herbison's page)
- The Te Tohu Pae Tawhiti Award is given to "researchers who have made a significant contribution to Maori education by conducting high quality research over an extended period of time". Notable winners include Angus Macfarlane (2010), Leonie Pihama (2015), Sonja Macfarlane (2017), Jenny Lee-Morgan, and Mere Berryman (2019).
