= Mere Berryman =

New Zealand academic

Mere Berryman ONZM
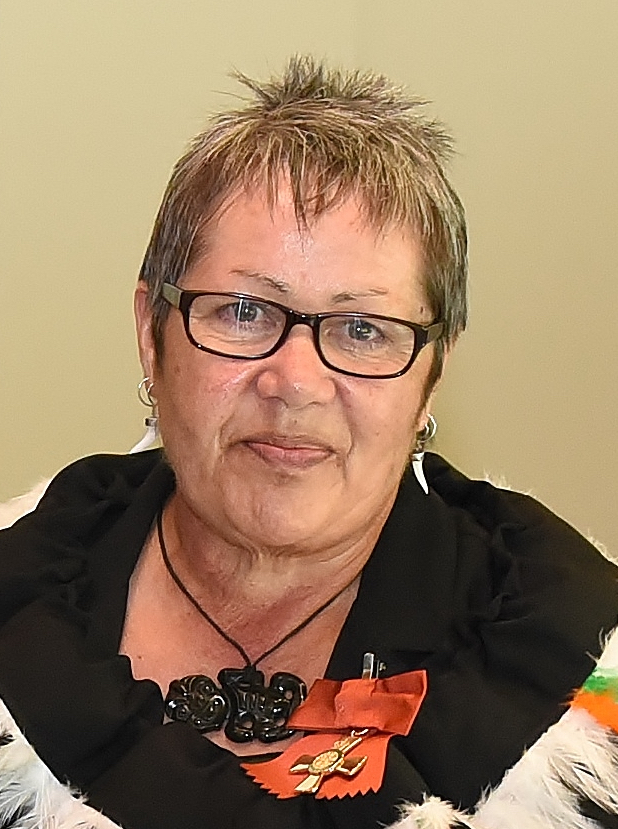
- Berryman in 2016
- Education: University of Waikato
- Scientific career
- Workplaces: University of Waikato
- Thesis: Repositioning within indigenous discourses of transformation and self-determination (2008)

Mere Anne Berryman ONZM is a New Zealand kaupapa Māori academic. She is Māori, of Ngāi Tūhoe, Ngāti Awa, and Ngāti Whare descent and as of 2019 is a full professor at the University of Waikato.

== Academic career ==
Berryman attained a master's degree at the University of Waikato in 2001. After a 2008 PhD titled 'Repositioning within indigenous discourses of transformation and self-determination' at the same institution, Berryman rose to full professor at the university.

In the 2016 New Year Honours, Berryman was appointed an Officer of the New Zealand Order of Merit, for services to Māori and education.

In 2017, Berryman was a finalist in the New Zealander of the Year

== Selected works ==
- Bishop, Russell, Mere Berryman, S. Tiakiwai, and Cath Richardson. "Te Kotahitanga: The experiences of year 9 and 10 Maori students in mainstream classrooms." Wellington, New Zealand: Ministry of Education (2003).
- Bishop, Russell, and Mere Berryman. Culture speaks: Cultural relationships and classroom learning. Huia Publishers, 2006.
- Bishop, Russell, Mere Berryman, Tom Cavanagh, and Lani Teddy. "Te kotahitanga: Addressing educational disparities facing Māori students in New Zealand." Teaching and Teacher Education 25, no. 5 (2009): 734–742.
- Bishop, Russell, Dominic O'Sullivan, and Mere Berryman. Scaling up Education Reform: Addressing the Politics of Disparity. New Zealand Council for Educational Research. PO Box 3237, Wellington 6140 New Zealand, 2010.
- Berryman, Mere, Suzanne SooHoo, and Ann Nevin, eds. Culturally responsive methodologies. Emerald Group Publishing, 2013.
