= Leonie Pihama =

New Zealand academic

Leonie Pihama FRSNZ
- Born: 1962 (age 63–64)
- Education: University of Auckland
- Scientific career
- Workplaces: University of Auckland, University of Waikato
- Theses: Tungia te ururua, kia tupu whakaritorito te tupu o te harakeke : a critical analysis of parents as first teachers (1993); Tīhei mauri ora : honouring our voices : mana wahine as a kaupapa Māori : theoretical framework (2001)
- Doctoral advisor: Linda Tuhiwai Smith
- Doctoral students: Donna Campbell

Leonie Eileen Pihama FRSNZ (born 1962) is a New Zealand kaupapa Māori academic.

== Career ==
Pihama was born in 1962. She wrote her 1993 master's thesis at the University of Auckland with the title Tungia te ururua, kia tupu whakaritorito te tupu o te harakeke: a critical analysis of parents as first teachers. She completed her PhD at the same institution in 2001 and her doctoral thesis had the title Tīhei mauri ora: honouring our voices: mana wahine as a kaupapa Māori: theoretical framework, and was supervised by Linda Tuhiwai Smith. She won a Fulbright-Ngā Pae o te Māramatanga Scholar Award and was a Ngā Pae o te Māramatanga principal investigator. She rose to Associate Professor there, before moving to the University of Waikato in Hamilton, New Zealand. Leonie moved to Ngā Wai ā Te Tūī Research Centre, Unitec, as Professor of Māori and Indigenous Research. She is now Professor of Māori and Indigenous Research at Tū Tama Wāhine o Taranaki and Director of Māori and Indigenous Analysis Ltd. Notable students include Donna Campbell.

Pihama served on the establishment board of Whakaata Māori (Māori Television) and then as a director, but quit after three years due to a conflict of interest involving a family member.

In 2017, Pihama was ranked as one of the '100 Māori leaders' by Te Rau Matatini. She was elected a Fellow of the Royal Society of New Zealand in 2022.

== Publications ==
- Pihama, Leonie, Fiona Cram, and Sheila Walker. "Creating methodological space: A literature review of Kaupapa Maori research." Canadian Journal of Native Education 26, no. 1 (2002): 30.
- Pihama, Leonie, Kaapua Smith, Mereana Taki, and Jenny Lee. "A literature review on kaupapa Maori and Maori education pedagogy." Prepared for ITP New Zealand by The International Research Institute for Maori and Indigenous Education (IRI) (2004).
- Johnston, Patricia, and Leonie Pihama. "What counts as difference and what differences count: Gender, race and the politics of difference." Irwin K, Ramsden I. Toi Wähine: The Worlds of Mäori Women. Penguin Books, Auckland (1995).
- Pihama, Leonie. "Are films dangerous?: a Maori woman's perspective on 'The Piano'." Hecate 20, no. 2 (1994): 239.

== Personal life ==
Pihama is of Te Ātiawa, Ngāti Māhanga and Ngā Māhanga ā Tairi descent.
