= New Zealand Council for Educational Research =

Research organisation

The New Zealand Council for Educational Research (NZCER) is an independent, educational research organisation that provides educators, students, parents, policy makers, and the public with innovative and independent research, analysis, and advice. Established in 1934 through grants from the Carnegie Corporation, it became a statutory body in 1945 and now operates under the NZCER Act 1972 (and amendments). It is not formally attached to any government department, university, or other educational organisation.

Under Section 13 of the NZCER Act, the organisation is required to:

- foster the study of, and research into, educational and other like matters;
- prepare and publish such reports on these matters as may in its opinion be necessary or of value to teachers or other persons;
- furnish information, advice, and assistance to persons and organisations concerned with education or similar matters.

NZCER conducts educational research and evaluation, and publishes reports. It provides information and advice to those involved in education, including policy makers, teachers, parents, advisers, and researchers.

== Notable people ==
- Jane Gilbert
- Clarence Edward Beeby
- Vera Hayward
- Geraldine McDonald
