= 2016 New Year Honours (New Zealand) =

Annual awards for New Zealanders

- Previous: 2015 New Zealand gallantry awards Next: 2016 Queen's 90th Birthday Honours
- Type: New Zealand royal honours: Order of New Zealand; New Zealand Order of Merit; Queen's Service Order; Queen's Service Medal; New Zealand Distinguished Service Decoration
- Date: 31 December 2015
- Country: New Zealand
- Total recipients: 176

The 2016 New Year Honours in New Zealand were appointments by Elizabeth II in her right as Queen of New Zealand, on the advice of the New Zealand government, to various orders and honours to reward and highlight good works by New Zealanders, and to celebrate the passing of 2015 and the beginning of 2016. They were announced on 31 December 2015.

The recipients of honours are listed here as they were styled before their new honour.

== Order of New Zealand (ONZ) ==
Ordinary member

- Richard Hugh McCaw – of Christchurch. For services to New Zealand.
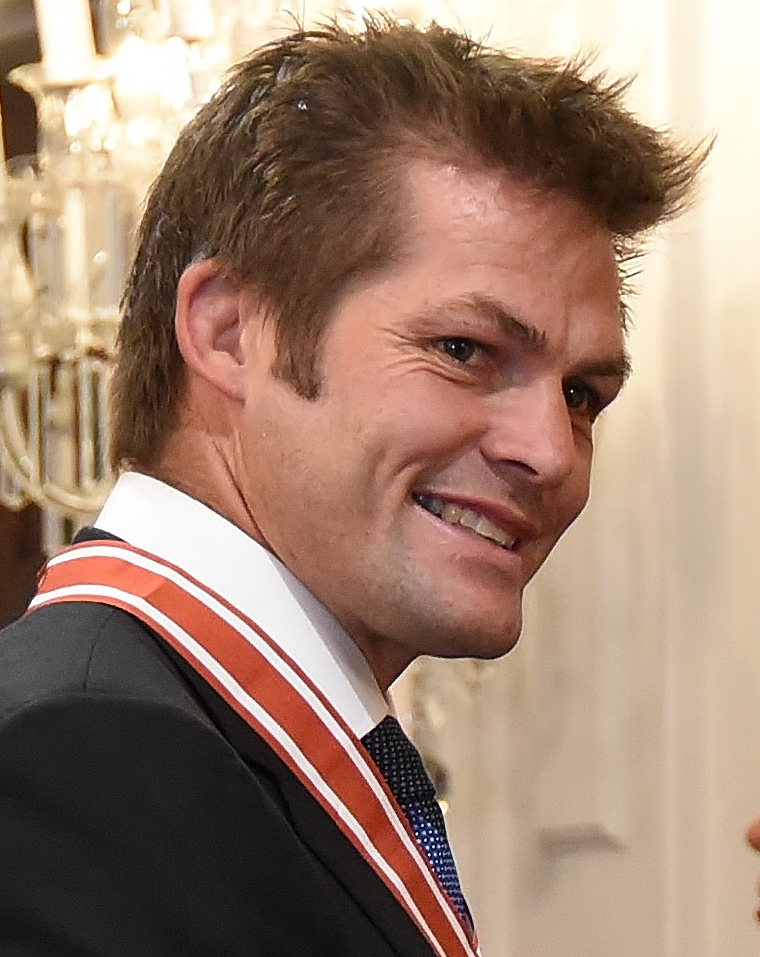
Richie McCaw

== New Zealand Order of Merit ==
=== Dame Companion (DNZM) ===
- Jane Campion – of Glenorchy. For services to film.
- Paula Rae Rebstock CNZM – of Auckland. For services to the State.
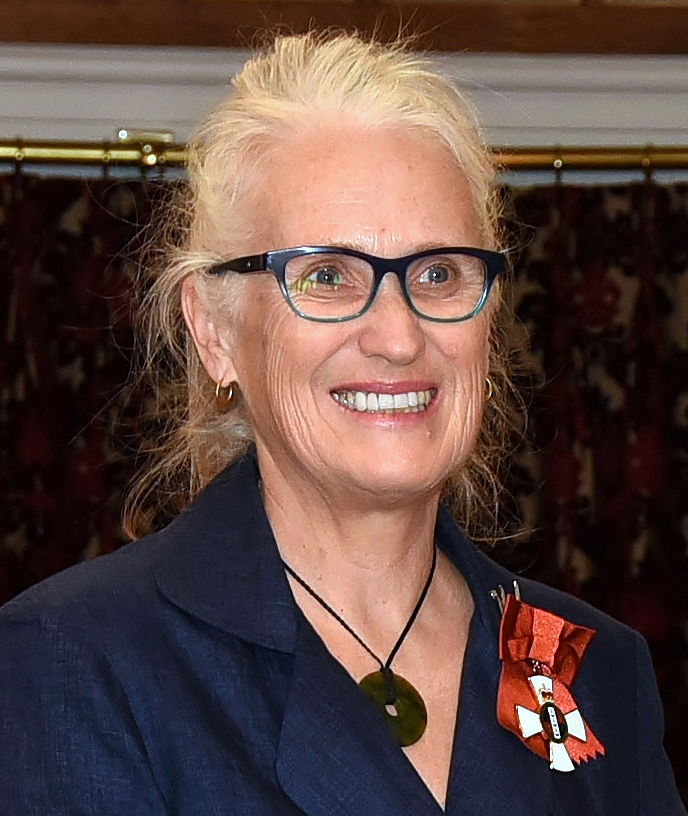
Dame Jane Campion

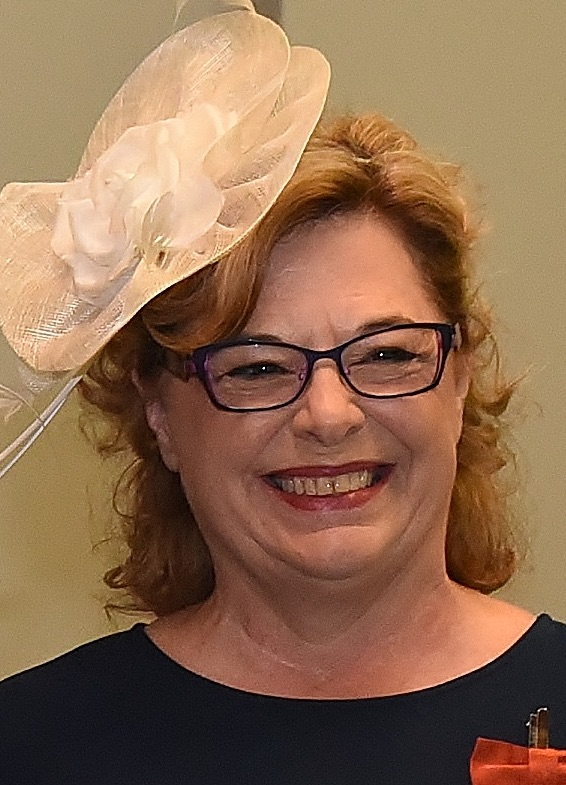
Dame Paula Rebstock

=== Knight Companion (KNZM) ===
- The Honourable Terence Arnold – of Wellington. For services to the judiciary.
- David Alexander Fagan ONZM – of Te Kūiti. For services to shearing.
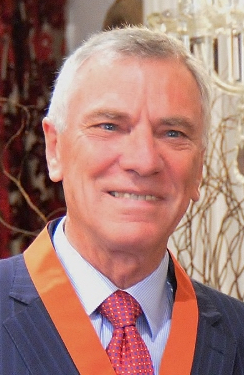
Sir Terence Arnold

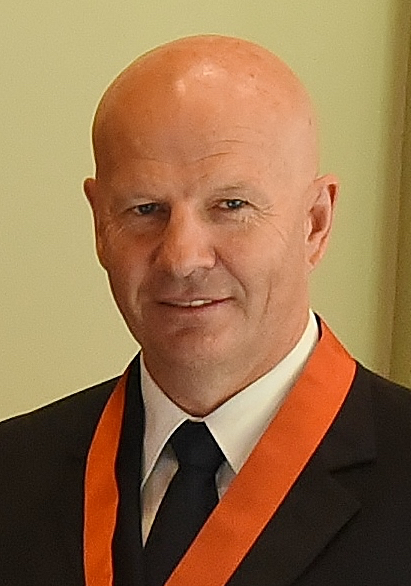
Sir David Fagan

=== Companion (CNZM) ===
- Professor Max Wenden Abbott – of Auckland. For services to health, science and education.
- The Honourable Pamela Jean Andrews – of Auckland. For services to the judiciary.
- Dr Ian Shepherd Civil MBE ED – of Auckland. For services to health.
- Corinne Barbara Haines – of Christchurch. For services to business.
- Robin Michael Hapi – of Foxton. For services to Māori, the community and governance.
- John Allandale Lee – of Wānaka. For services to business and tourism.
- Christopher Pell Liddell – of New York, United States of America. For services to business and philanthropy.
- The Honourable Alan Donald MacKenzie – of Wellington. For services to the judiciary.
- Peter Hanbury Masfen – of Auckland. For services to business and philanthropy.
- John Brodie Matthews – of New Plymouth. For services to the arts and engineering.
- Professor Lesley Margaret Elizabeth McCowan ONZM – of Auckland. For services to health.
- Virginia Margaret Radford QSO JP – of Auckland. For services to Girl Guides.
- Penelope Elsie Simmonds – of Invercargill. For services to education, sport and the community.
- Joyce Adele, Lady Simpson – of Christchurch. For services as a philanthropist.
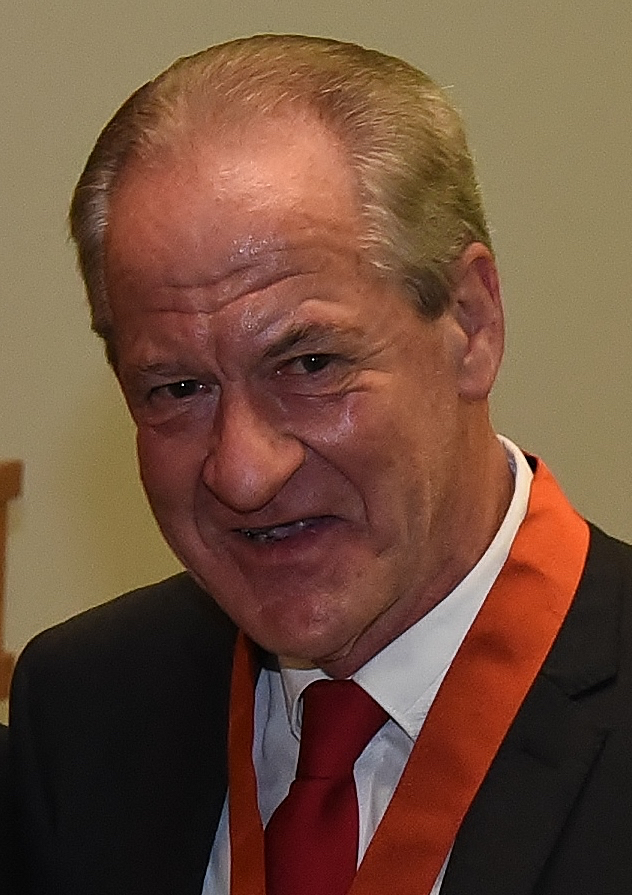
Max Abbott

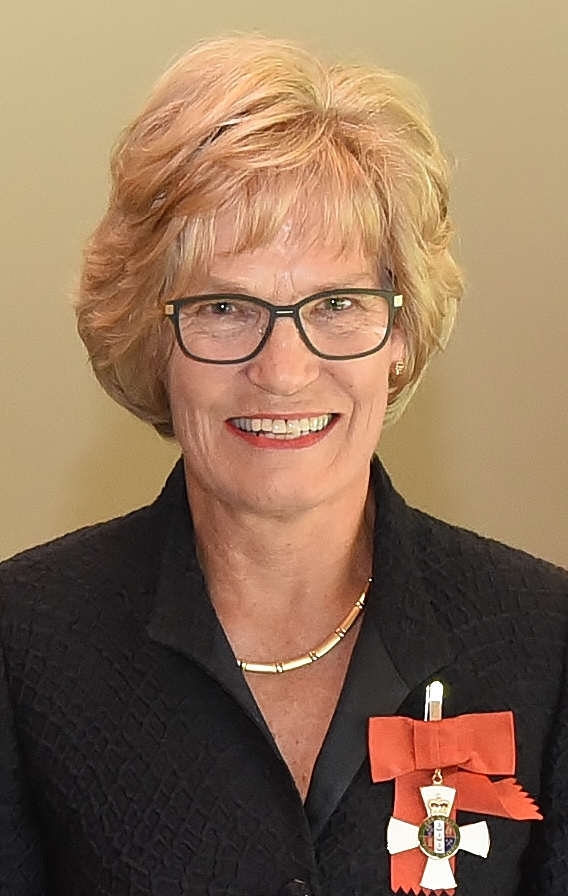
Pamela Andrews

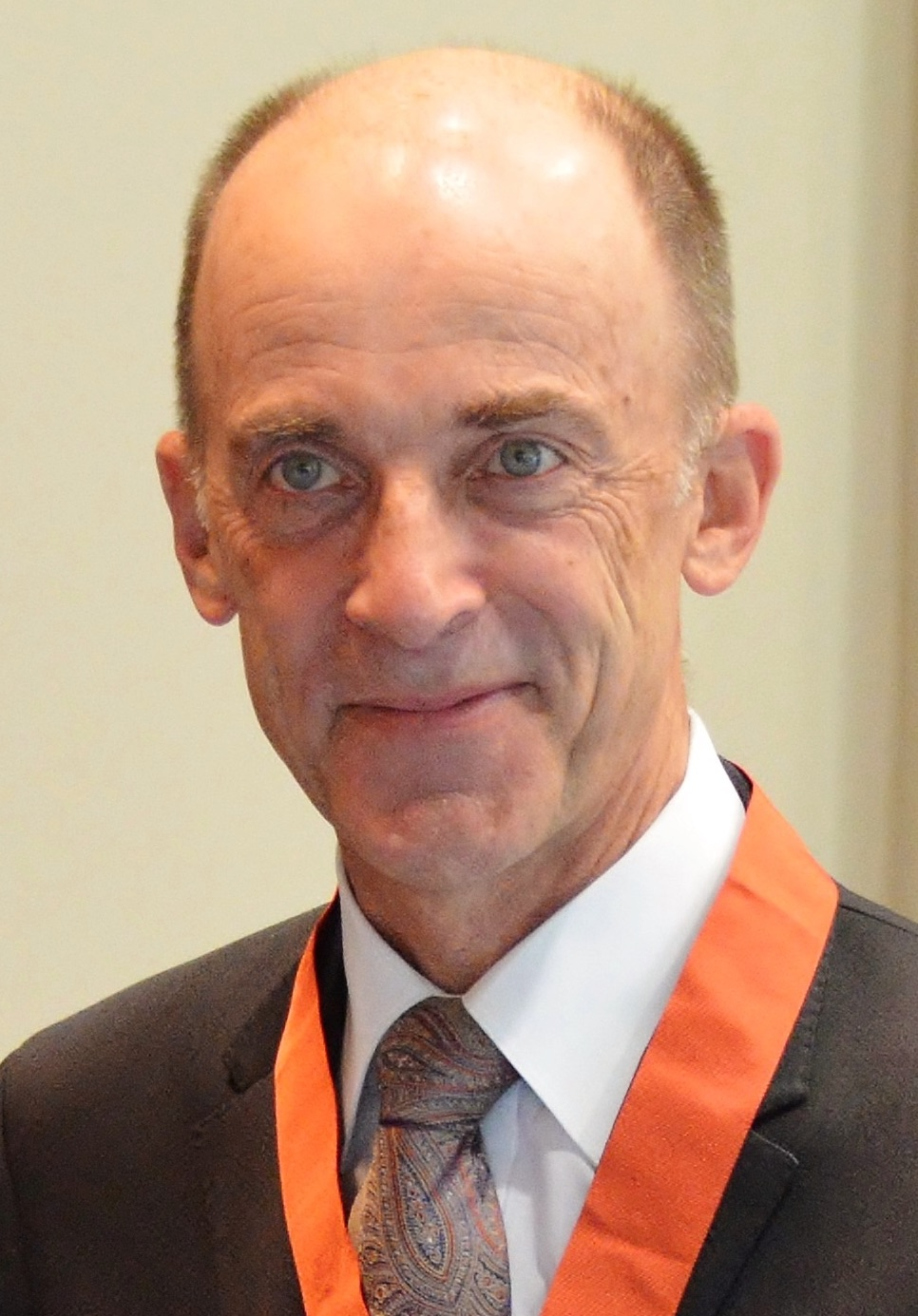
Ian Civil

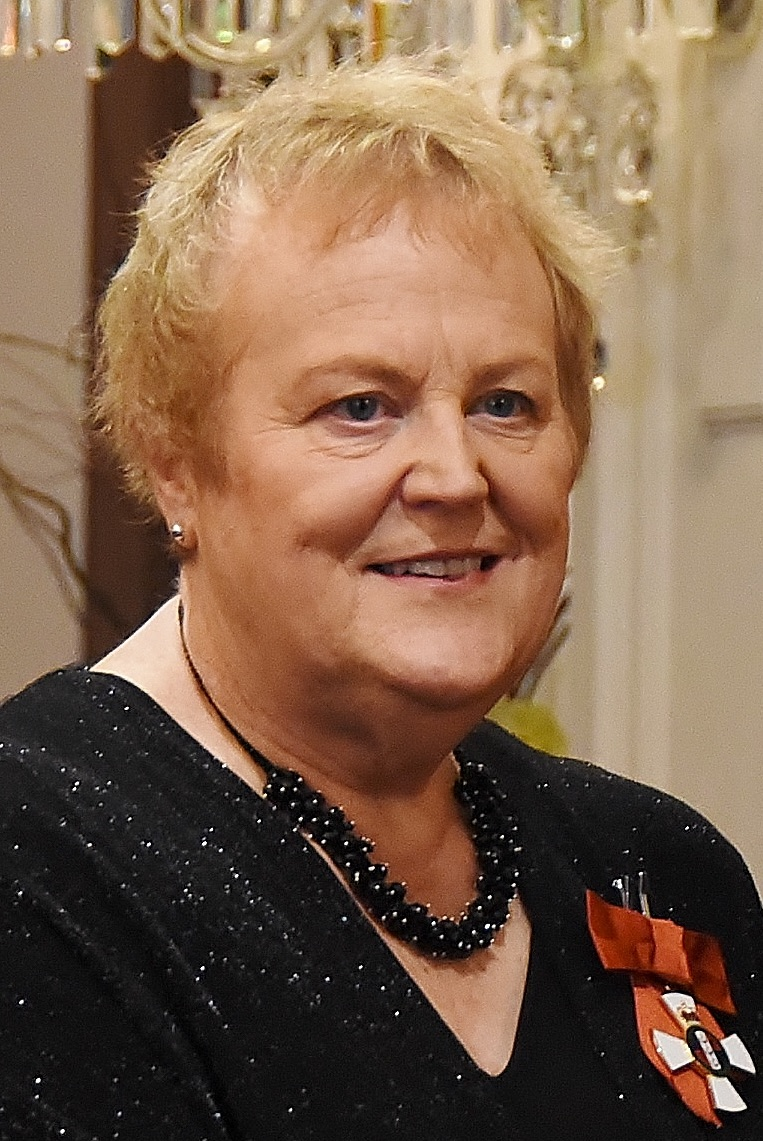
Corinne Haines

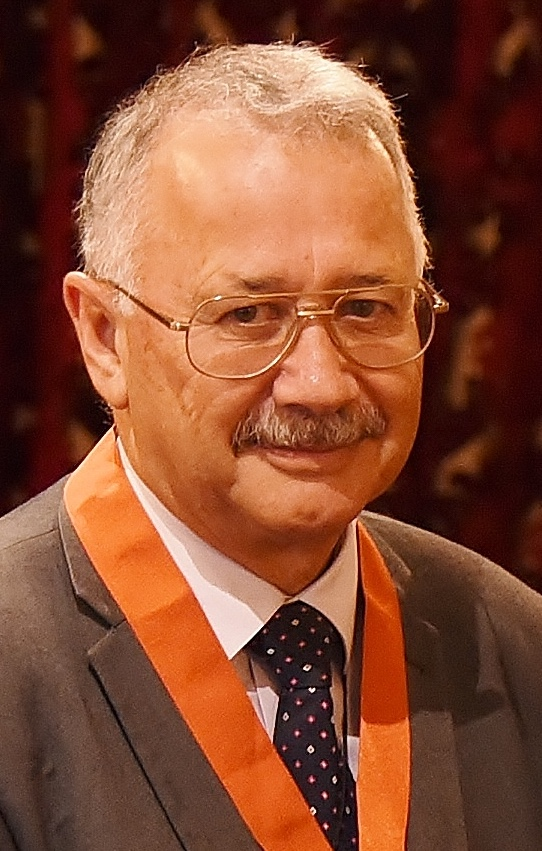
Robin Hapi

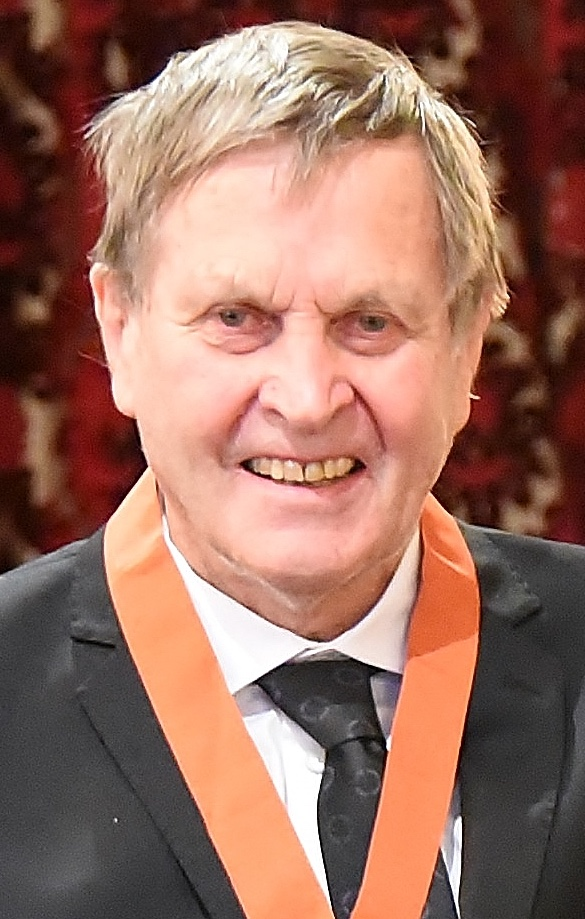
John Lee

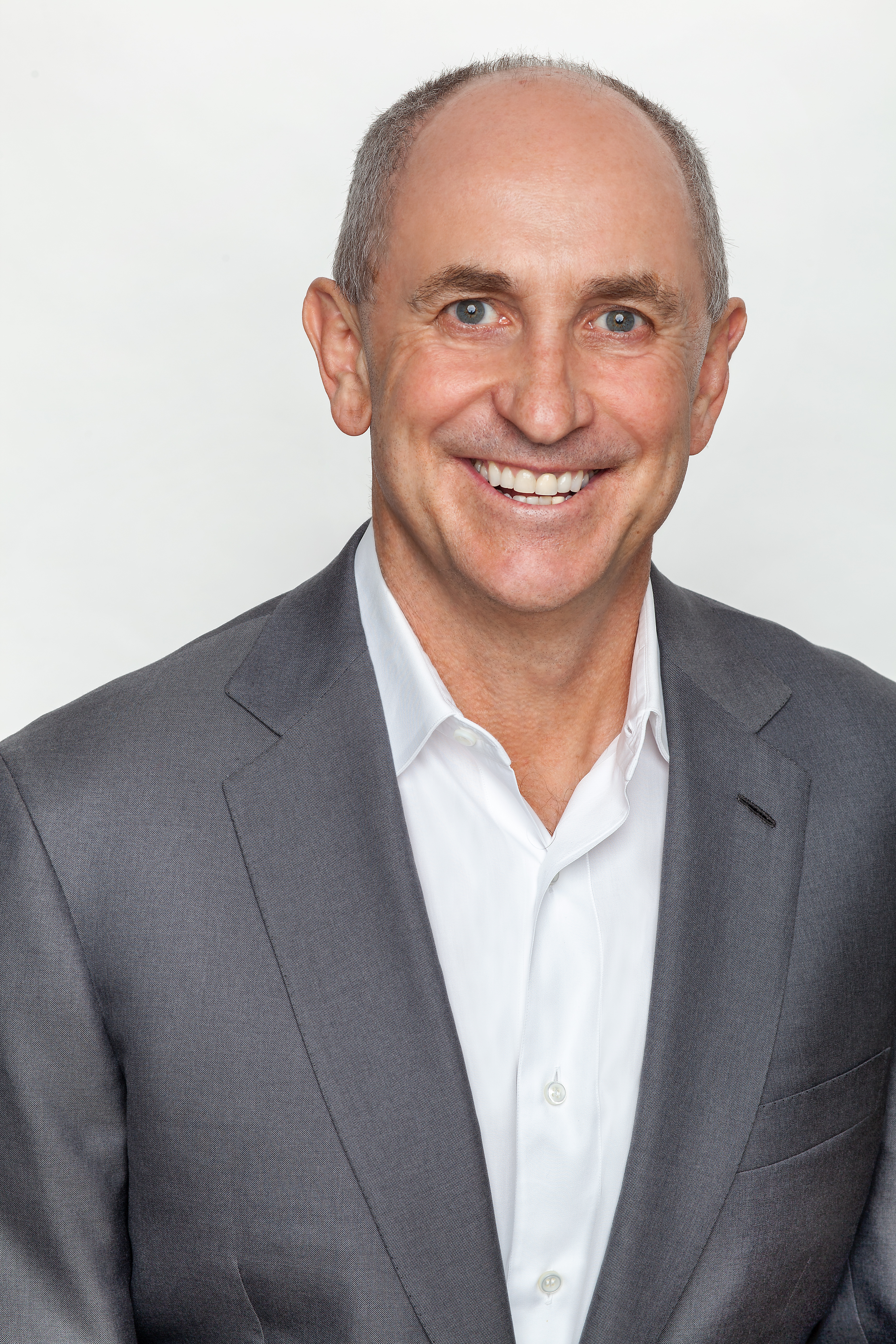
Chris Liddell

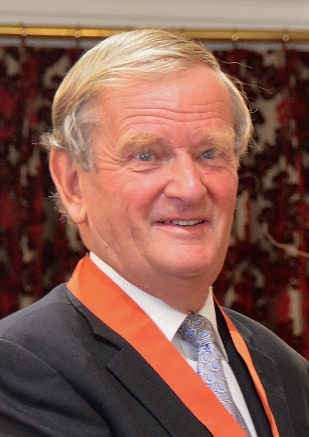
Alan MacKenzie

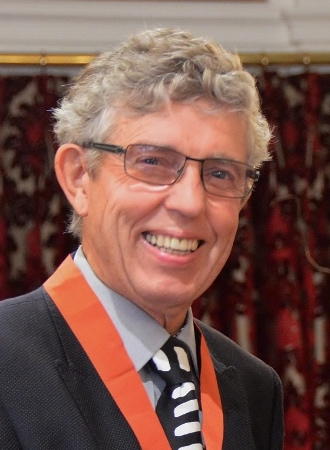
John Matthews

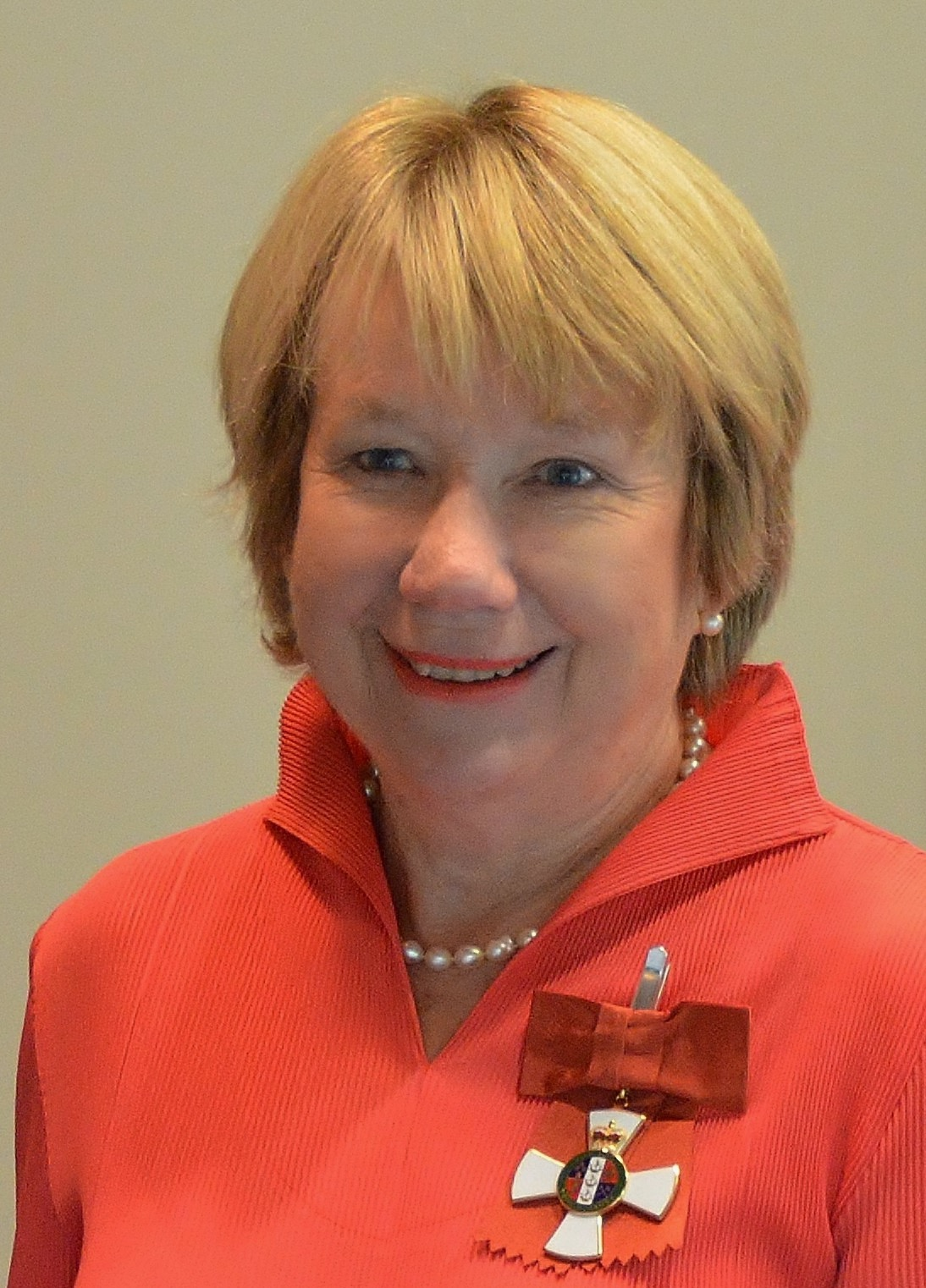
Lesley McCowan

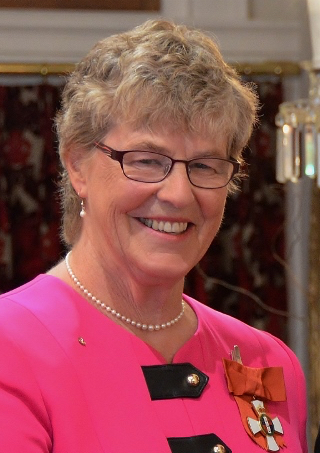
Ginny Radford

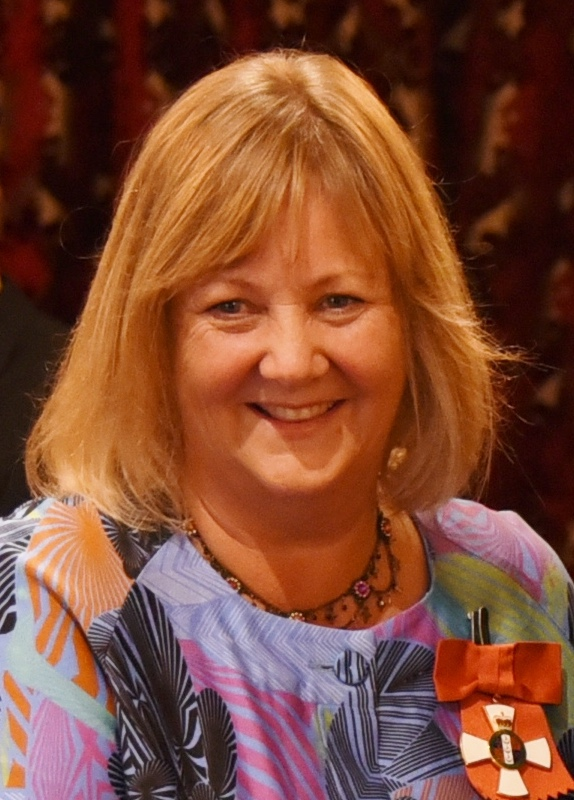
Penny Simmonds

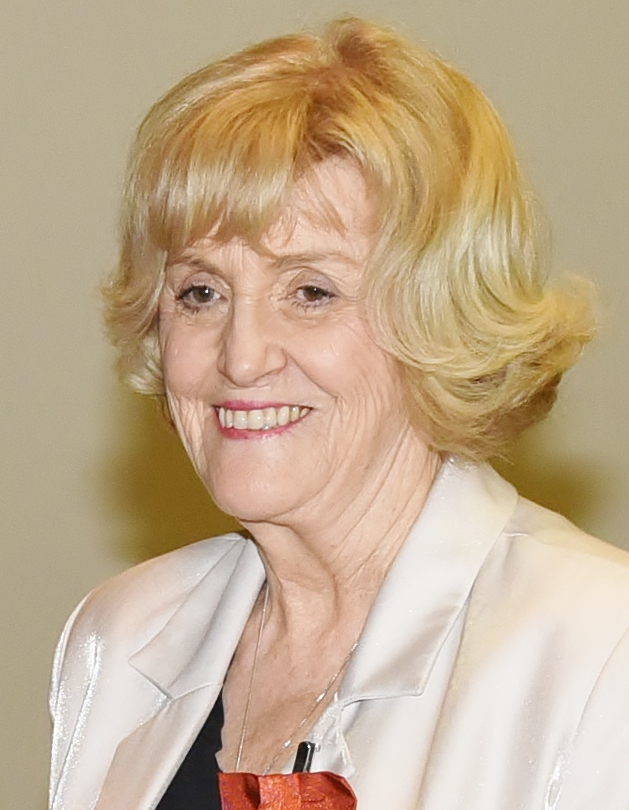
Joy, Lady Simpson

=== Officer (ONZM) ===
- Dr Simon Gardiner Allan – of Palmerston North. For services to palliative care.
- Brian John Anderton – of Mosgiel. For services to the racing industry.
- John Brodie Armstrong – of Wellington. For services to journalism.
- Bice Awan – of Wellington. For services to mental health and rehabilitation.
- James Barker – of Mt Maunganui. For services to the transport industry and philanthropy.
- Professor Mere Anne Berryman – of Mt Maunganui. For services to Māori and education.
- Emeritus Professor Alan Russell Bishop – of Hamilton. For services to Māori and education.
- Stephen Lewis Boock – of Christchurch. For services to sport and the community.
- Daniel William Carter – of Paris, France. For services to rugby.
- Victoria Mary Carter – of Auckland. For services to the arts, business and the community.
- David Alexander Civil – of Cambridge. For services to the dairy industry.
- Neil John Craig – of Tauranga. For services to business and philanthropy.
- Robert Davison – of Wellington. For services to sheep and beef industries.
- Dr Joanne Dixon – of Christchurch. For services to clinical genetics.
- Gilbert Ernest Enoka – of Christchurch. For services to rugby and sport psychology.
- George Roger Wayne France – of Auckland. For services to business.
- William Peter Francis JP – of Auckland. For services to broadcasting and cricket.
- Professor David Barry Gauld – of Auckland. For services to mathematics.
- Dianne Glenn JP – of Pukekohe. For services to disabled women and the environment.
- Kevin James Hickman – of Christchurch. For services to aged care and sport.
- Professor Charles Frank Wandesforde Higham – of Dunedin. For services to archaeology.
- Emeritus Professor Janet Holmes – of Wellington. For services to linguistics.
- Derek Roy Johns – of Christchurch. For services to electrical safety standards.
- Professor Helen May – of Dunedin. For services to education.
- Dr Richard John Mayhew – of Auckland. For services to sports medicine.
- John Mervyn McDonnell – of Cambridge. For services to cycling.
- Dr Andrew Durrad McEwen – of Wellington. For services to forestry.
- Professor Kevin Craig Pringle – of Lower Hutt. For services to paediatric surgery.
- Phillip Graeme Shatford – of Christchurch. For services to boxing.
- Annette Julia Smith – of Hamilton. For services to children's literacy.
- Waimarama Taumaunu MBE – of Wellington. For services to netball.
- Jane Tolerton – of Wellington. For services to historical research.
- Archbishop William Brown Turei – of Gisborne. For services to the Anglican Church.
- Stephen Patrick Vaughan – of Wellington. For services to the New Zealand Police and the community.
- Dr David John Walker – of Lower Hutt. For services to the State.
- John Anthony Waller – of Auckland. For services to business and the community.
- Professor Norman Williamson – of Palmerston North. For services to the veterinary profession.
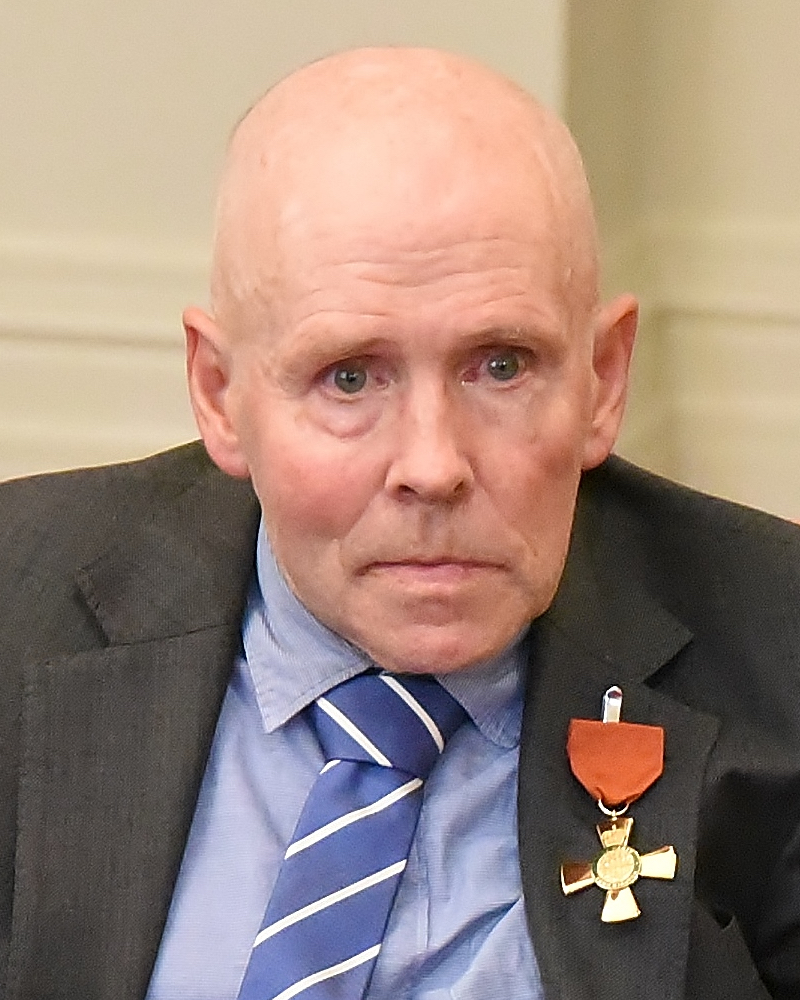
John Armstrong

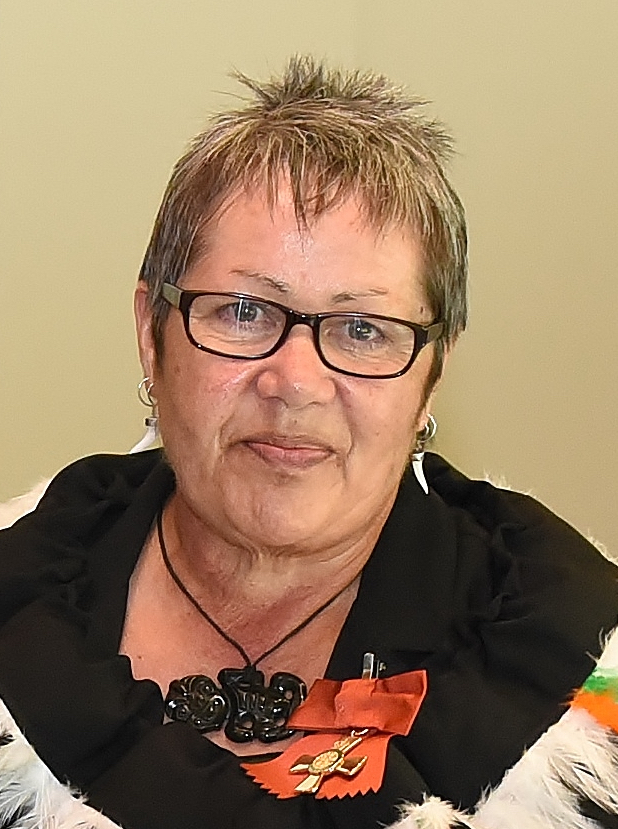
Mere Berryman

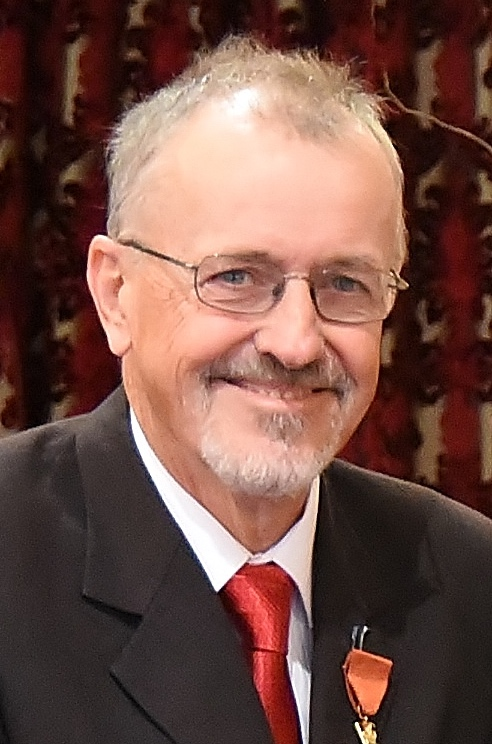
Russell Bishop

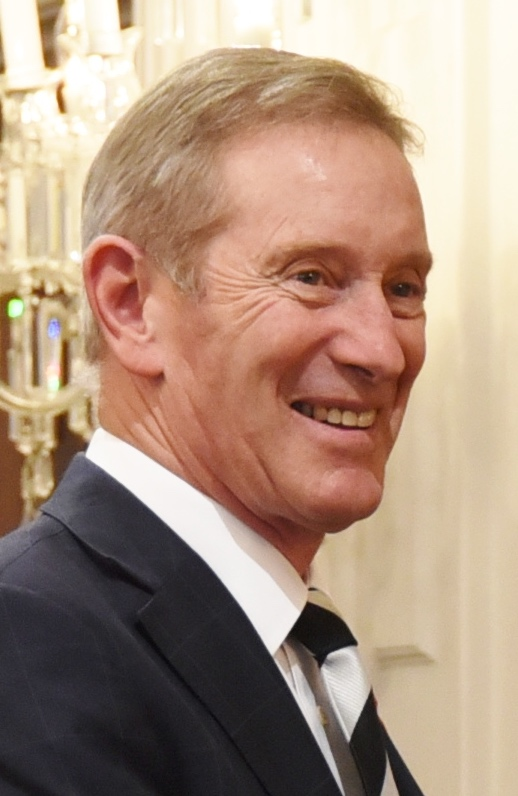
Stephen Boock

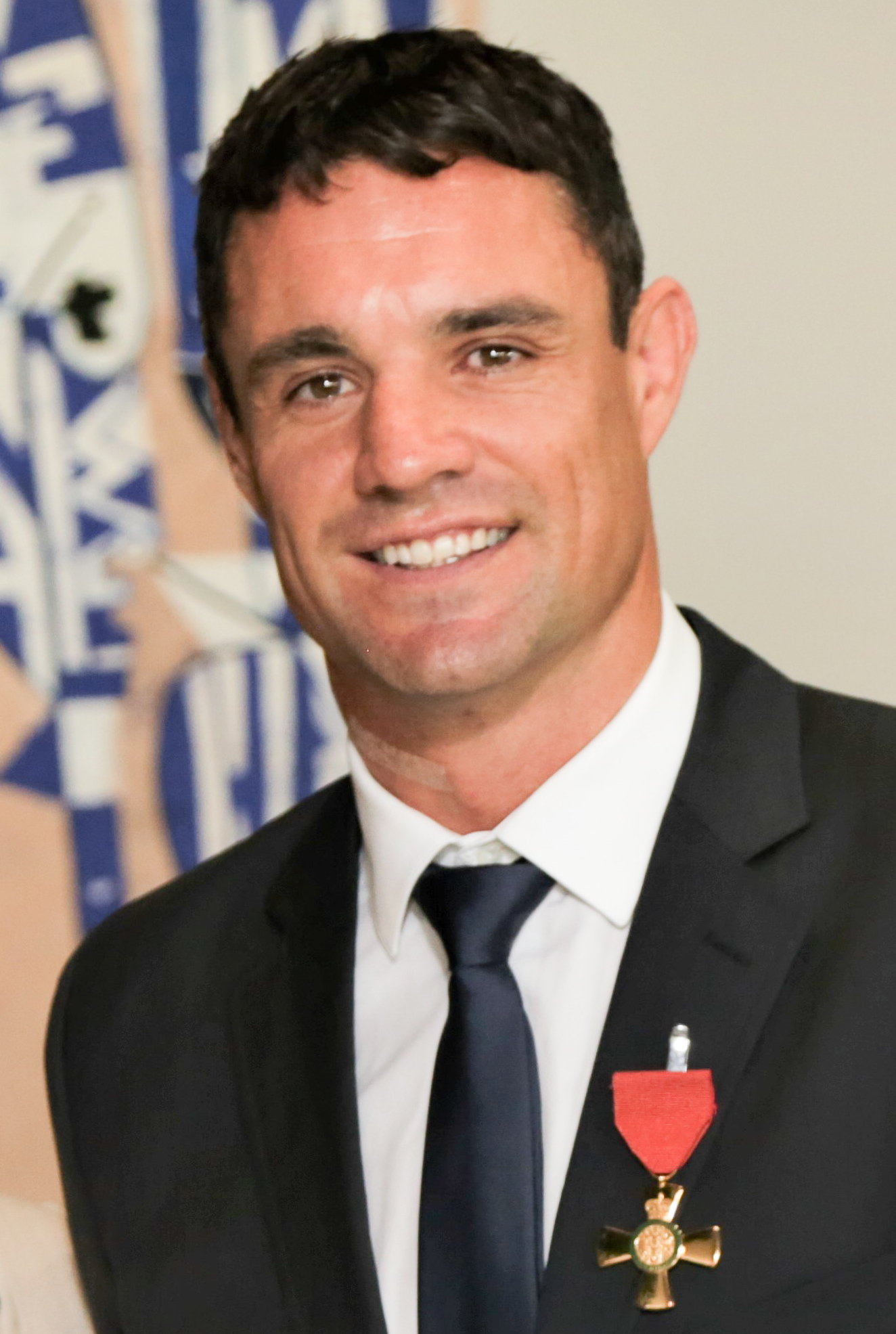
Dan Carter

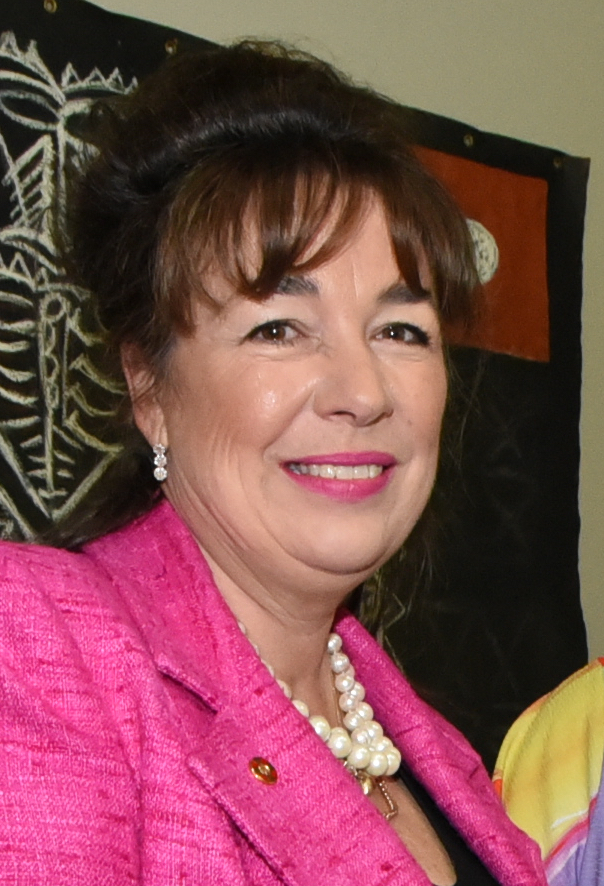
Victoria Carter

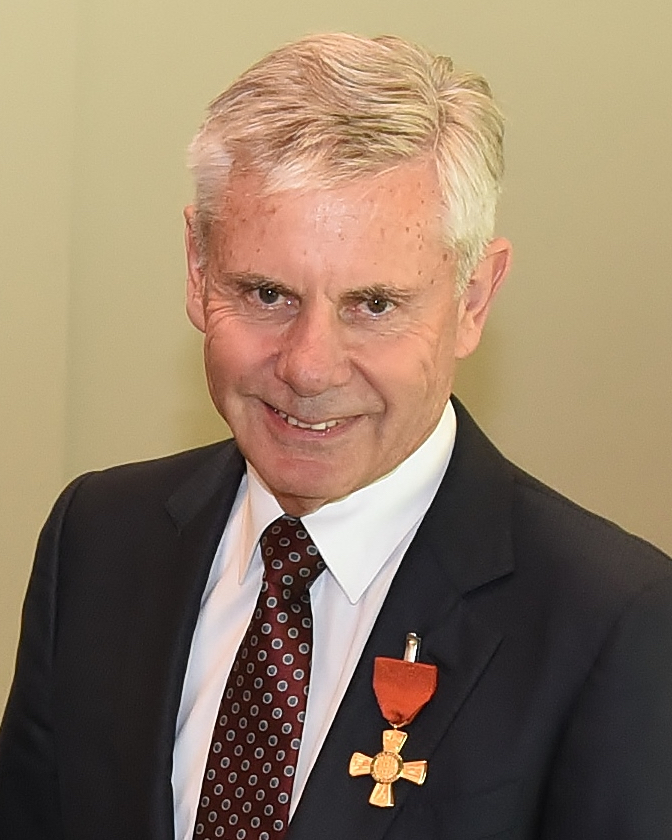
Roger France

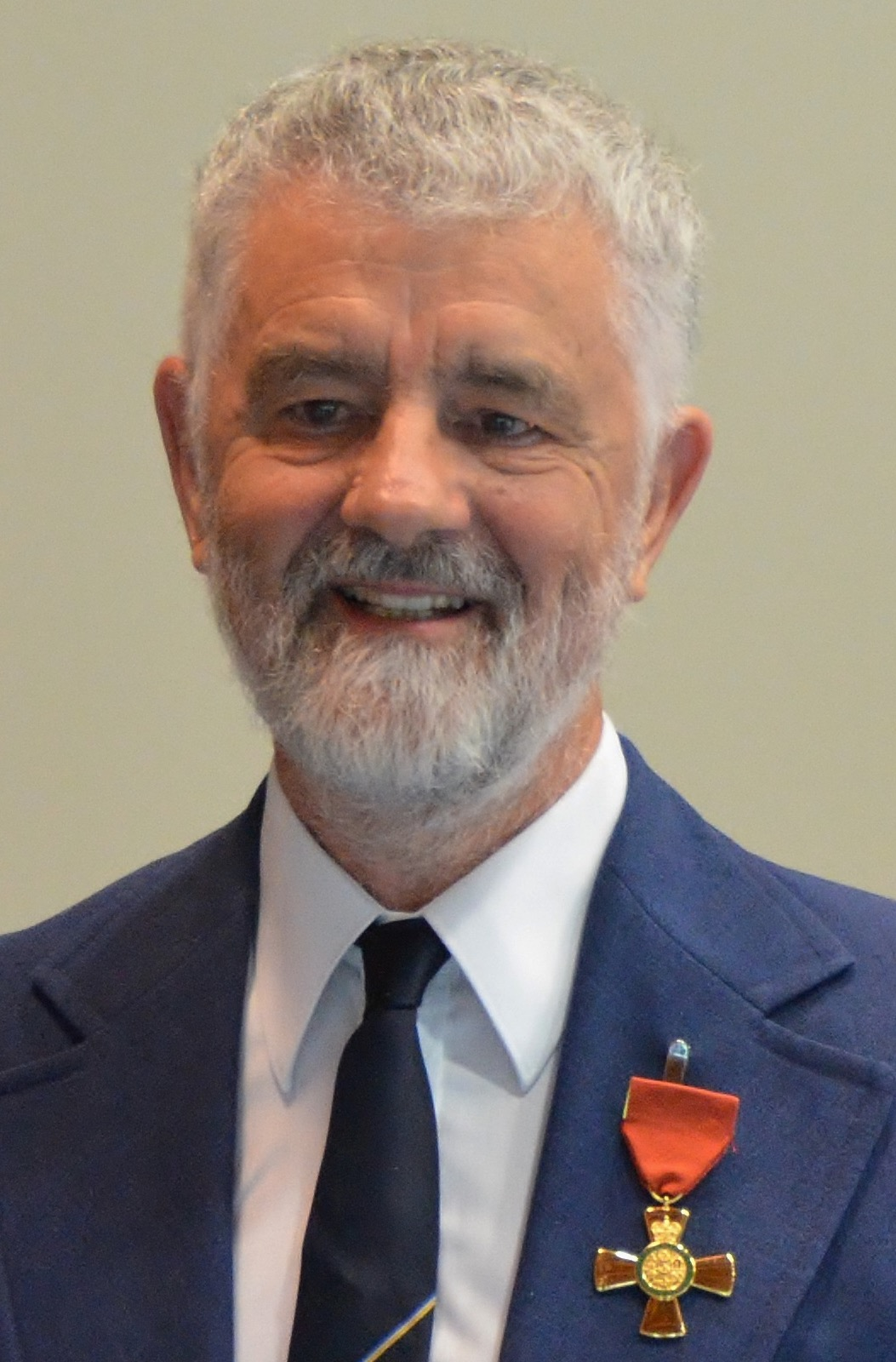
David Gauld

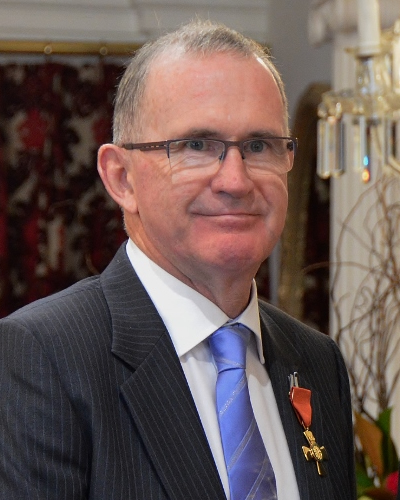
Kevin Hickman

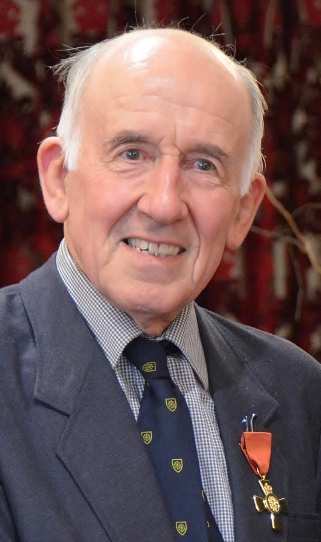
Charles Higham

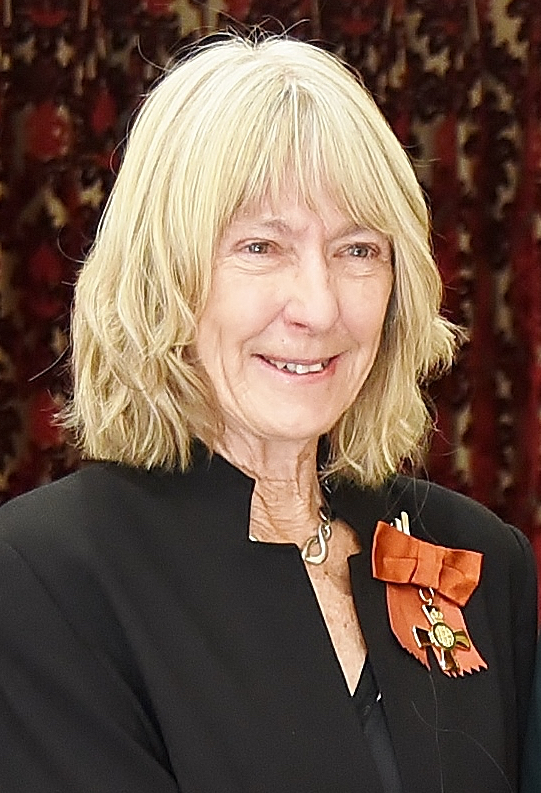
Janet Holmes

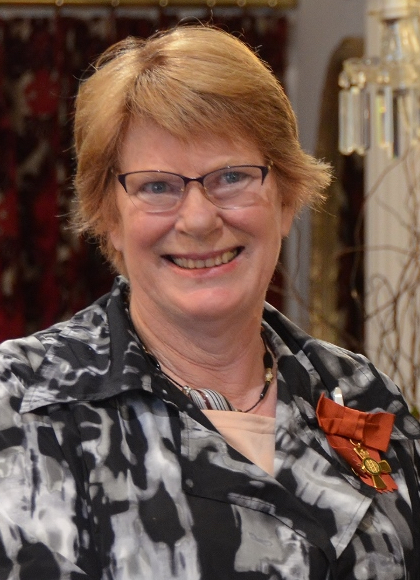
Helen May

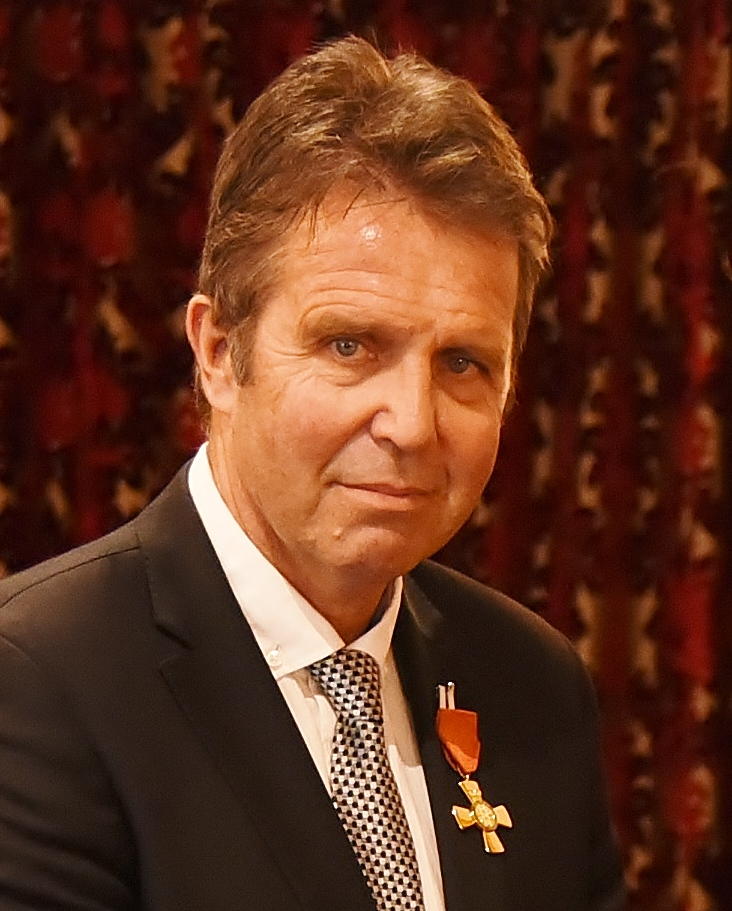
John Mayhew

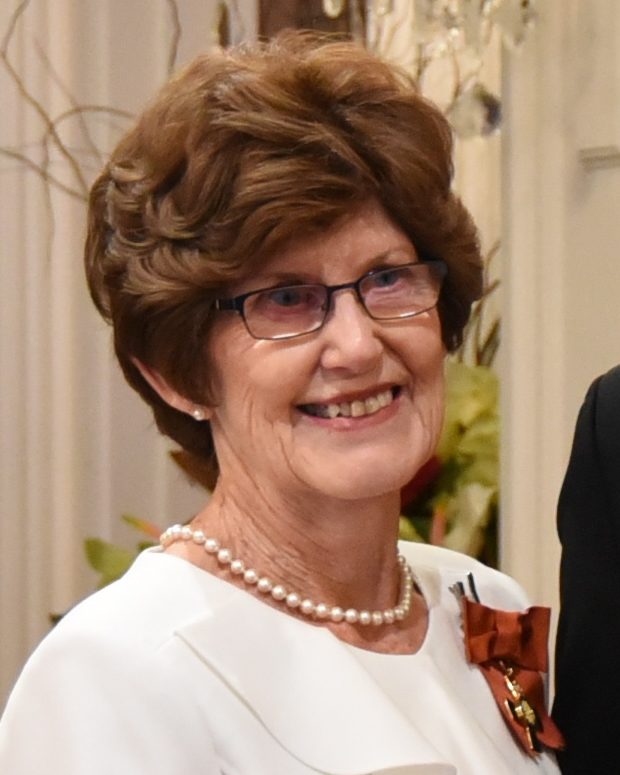
Annette Smith

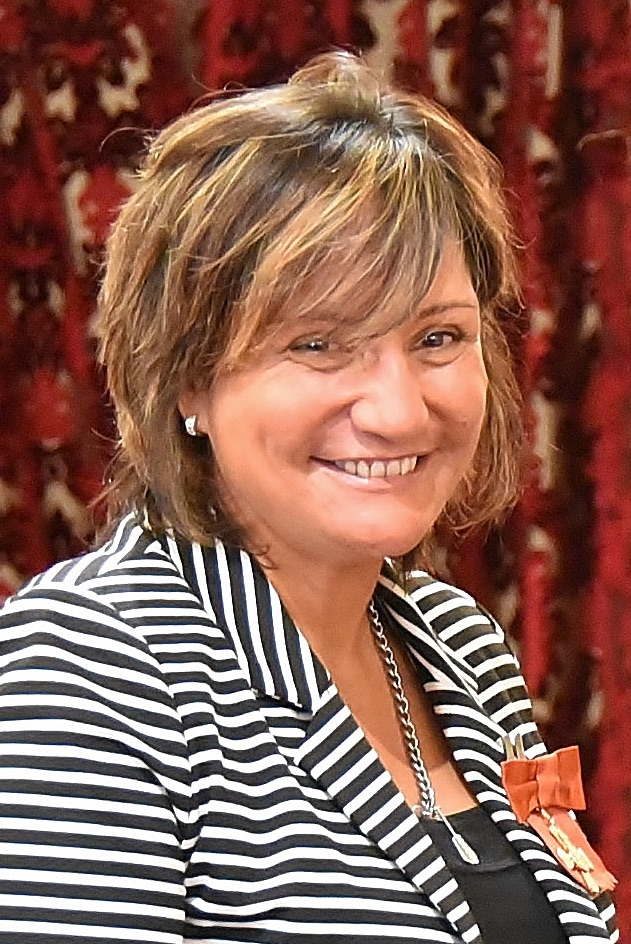
Waimarama Taumaunu

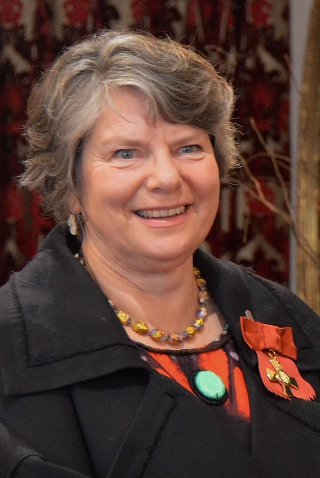
Jane Tolerton

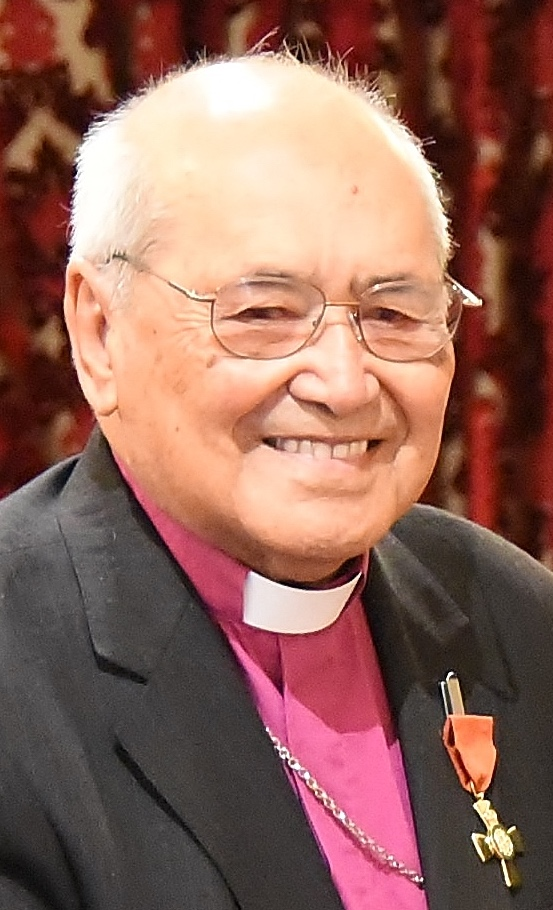
Brown Turei

=== Member (MNZM) ===
- Janet Elspeth Adams – of Wellington. For services to education.
- Emeline Lilian Afeaki-Mafile'o – of Auckland. For services to the Pacific community.
- William Paul Allison – of Cromwell. For services to sport.
- Kevin John Blogg – of Banks Peninsula. For services to people with disabilities.
- Phillip James Blundell – of Upper Hutt. For services to people with disabilities and the community.
- William Morgan Bly JP – of Woodville. For services to the community.
- Hayley Rose Bowden – of Auckland. For services to football.
- Jodi Anne Brown – of Dunedin. For services to netball.
- James Clarence Campbell – of Masterton. For services to conservation.
- Norman Donald Campbell – of Waikanae. For services to tertiary education.
- John Te Manihera Chadwick – of Rotorua. For services to Māori and the law.
- Larry Raynor Ching – of Nelson. For services to education.
- Michael Cron – of Christchurch. For services to rugby.
- Graeme Herbert Daniel – of Christchurch. For services to special education.
- Keith Oliver Diprose – of Te Aroha. For services to athletics.
- Neil Donald Edmundson – of Napier. For services to hockey.
- Gary Leslie Endacott – of Christchurch. For services to people with disabilities.
- Krystal Dianna Forgesson – of Auckland. For services to hockey.
- Antony John Groome – of Feilding. For services to Search and Rescue.
- Kathleen Janet Guy – of Taupō. For services to the tourism and hospitality industries.
- Colin John Hawke – of Timaru. For services to rugby.
- Peter Lawrence Hays – of Auckland. For services to accounting and the community.
- Colin Neil Hemmingsen – of Lower Hutt. For services to music.
- Sally Mitchell Hunt – of Nelson. For services to philanthropy and the arts.
- Henare Whitu Kingi – of Lower Hutt. For services to Māori and broadcasting.
- Jonathon Charles Wilfred Kirk – of Waimate. For services to agriculture.
- Peter Reid Lange – of Auckland. For services to ceramic arts.
- Timothy Grant Livingstone – of Auckland. For services to business and the community.
- Rodney George Macann – of Waikanae. For services to opera and the Baptist Church.
- Carole Josephine Maddix – of Auckland. For services to netball.
- John Stewart McBeth – of Wellington. For services as a sports broadcaster.
- Keven Filipo Mealamu – of Auckland. For services for rugby.
- Bernard Hanmer Monk – of Greymouth. For services to the community.
- Peter Corran Morris – of Masterton. For services to equestrian sports.
- Alexander Ross Morrison – of Auckland. For services to tennis.
- Dawn Cecelia Morrison – of Auckland. For services to tennis.
- Jan Moss – of Auckland. For services to the care of disabled people.
- Linda Patricia Nelson – of Eketāhuna. For services to agriculture and women.
- Ma'a Nonu – of Toulon, France. For services to rugby.
- Te Aroha Paenga JP – of Auckland. For services to Māori.
- Jane Frances Patterson – of Auckland. For services to sports administration.
- Malcolm Stewart Rands – of Auckland. For services to business, conservation and philanthropy.
- Carol Margaret Rose – of Wakefield. For services to the community.
- Bernard James Rush – of Whanganui. For services to the New Zealand Fire Service and Urban Search and Rescue.
- Adam Lindsay Gordon Ryall – of Auckland. For services to the deaf and as a philanthropist.
- Colin Neil Smith – of Greymouth. For services to the community.
- Conrad Gerard Smith – of Pau, France. For services to rugby.
- Rex Smith – of Auckland. For services to cricket.
- Carolyn Gay Solomon – of Auckland. For services to education.
- Lee Osborne Stevens – of Auckland. For services to the community.
- Julia Margaret Tattershaw – of Gore. For services to senior citizens and the community.
- Rachel Emere Taulelei – of Lower Hutt. For services to the food and hospitality industry.
- John Stuart Taylor – of Auckland. For services to education.
- Wharemawhai Mina Timutimu – of Whakatāne. For services to Māori and midwifery.
- Gerard Justin Toebes – of Wellington. For services to basketball.
- Christopher Turver JP – of Ōtaki. For services to journalism, local government and the community.
- Colin Ward – of Wellington. For services to softball.
- Tony Dale Woodcock – of Kaukapakapa. For services to rugby.
- Captain Mark Robert Worsfold – of Auckland. For services to the New Zealand Defence Force.
- Darren Walter Wright – of Christchurch. For services to the community.

Honorary

- Eiichi Ishii – of Tokyo, Japan. For services to New Zealand–Japan relations, golf and tourism.
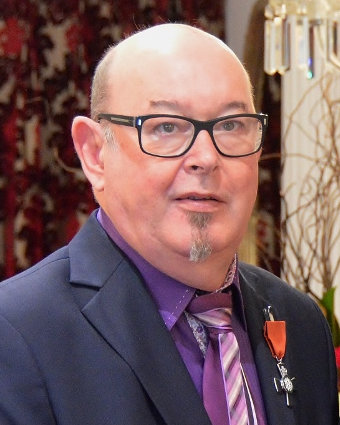
Kevin Blogg

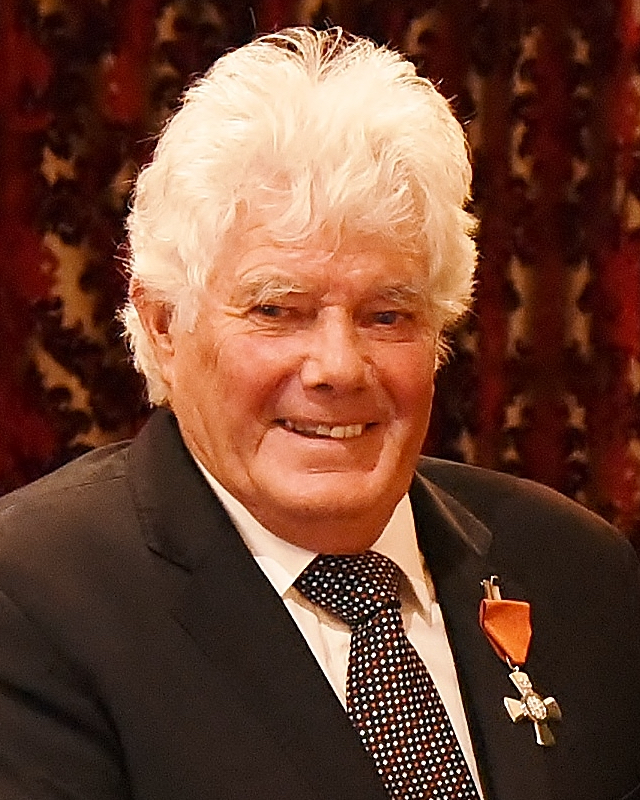
Bill Bly

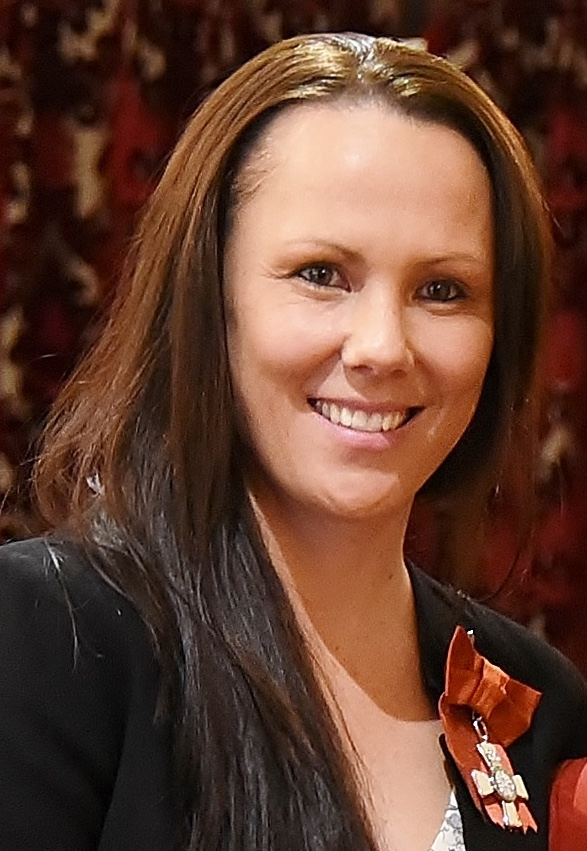
Hayley Bowden

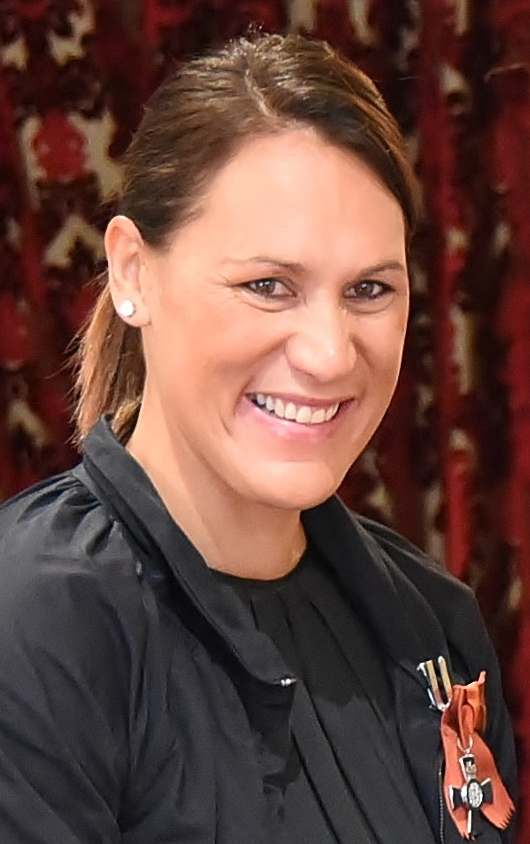
Jodi Brown

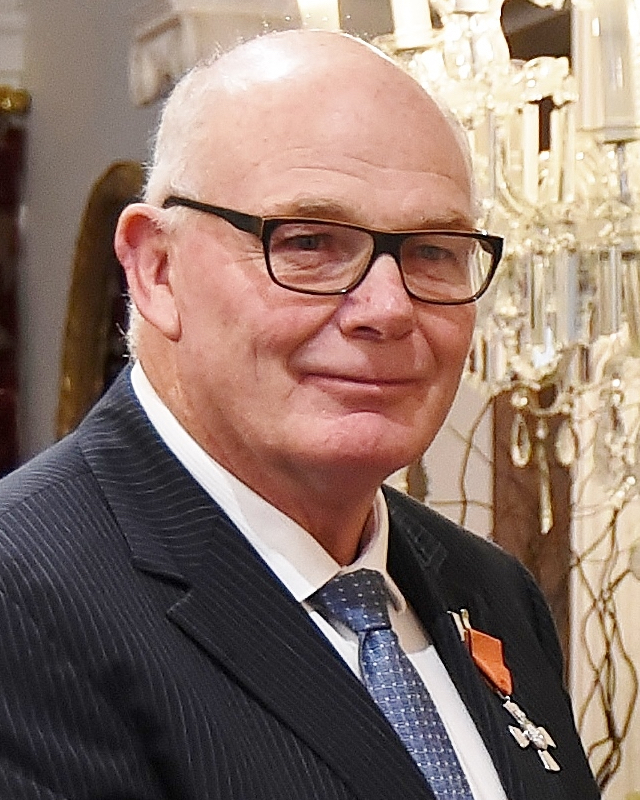
Mike Cron

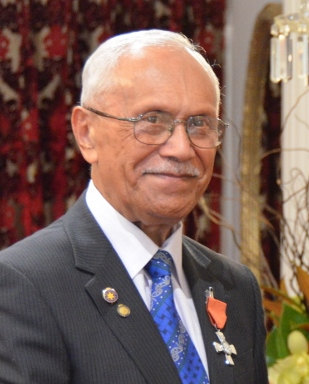
Henare Kingi

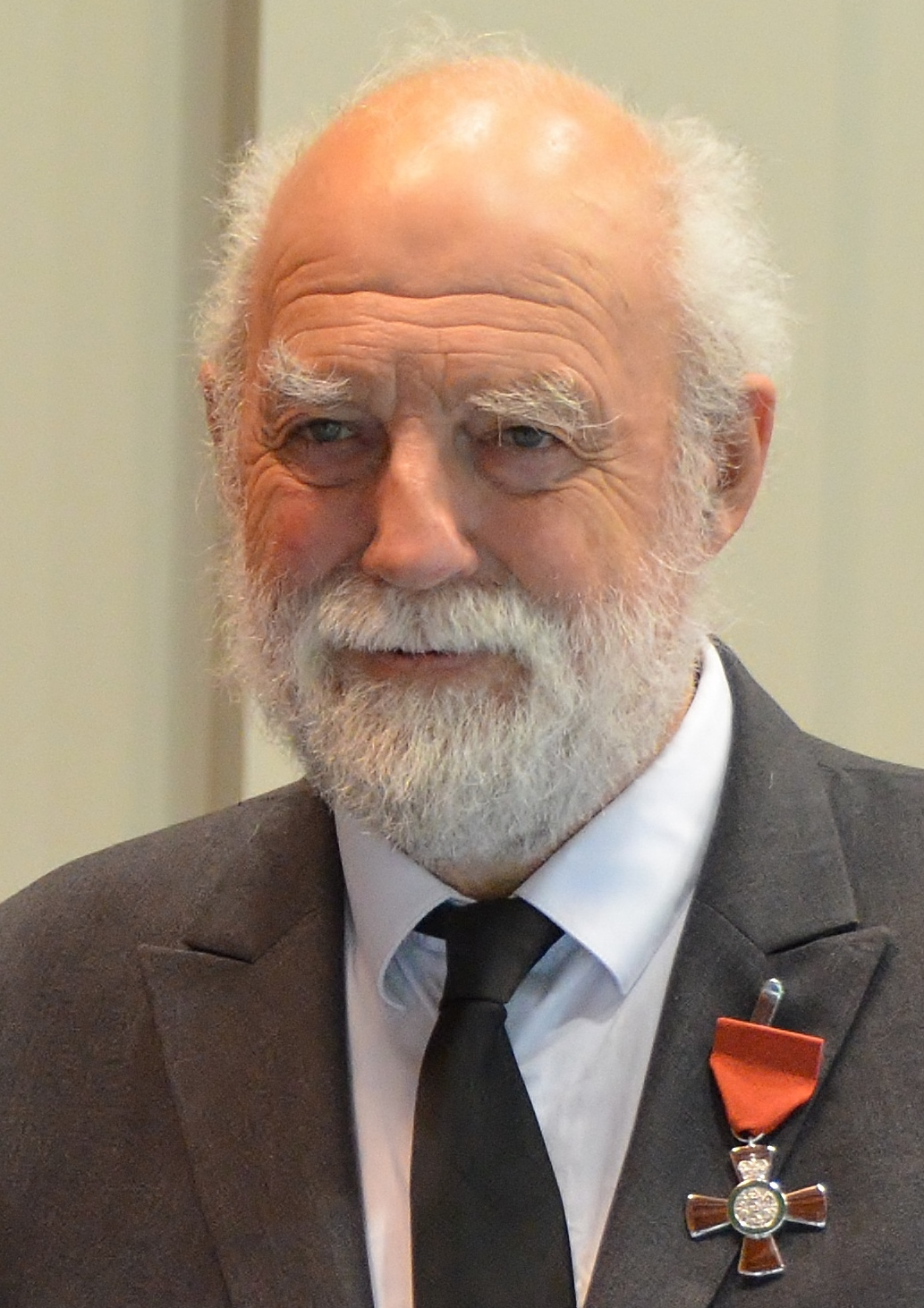
Peter Lange

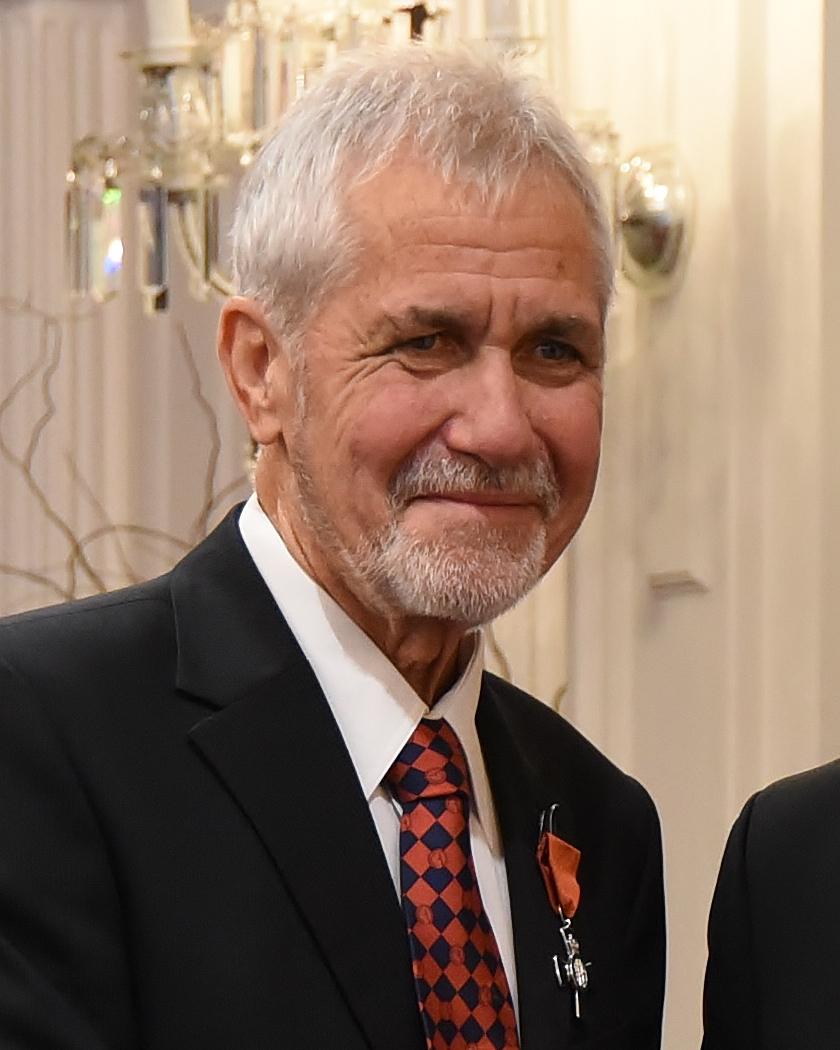
Rodney Macann

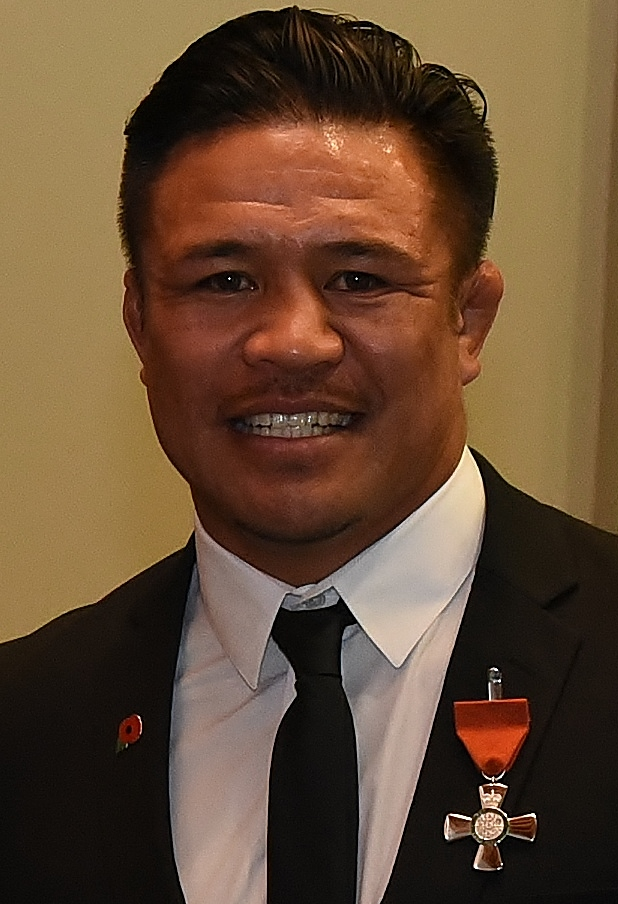
Keven Mealamu

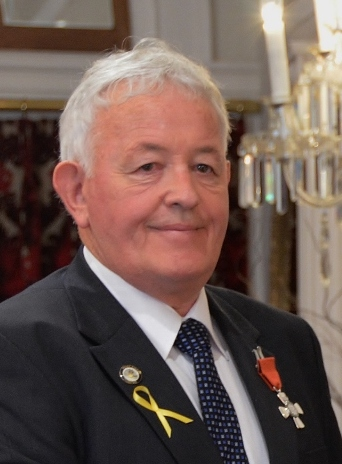
Bernie Monk

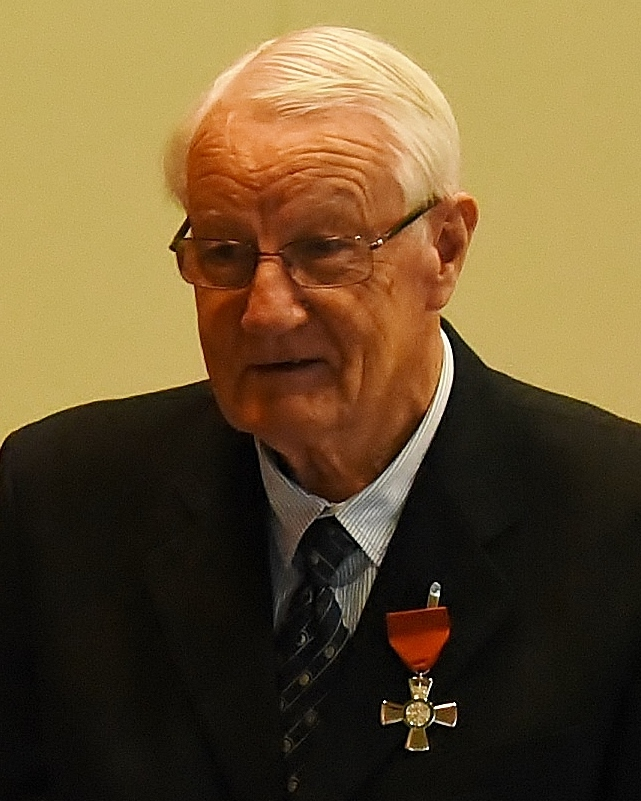
Ross Morrison

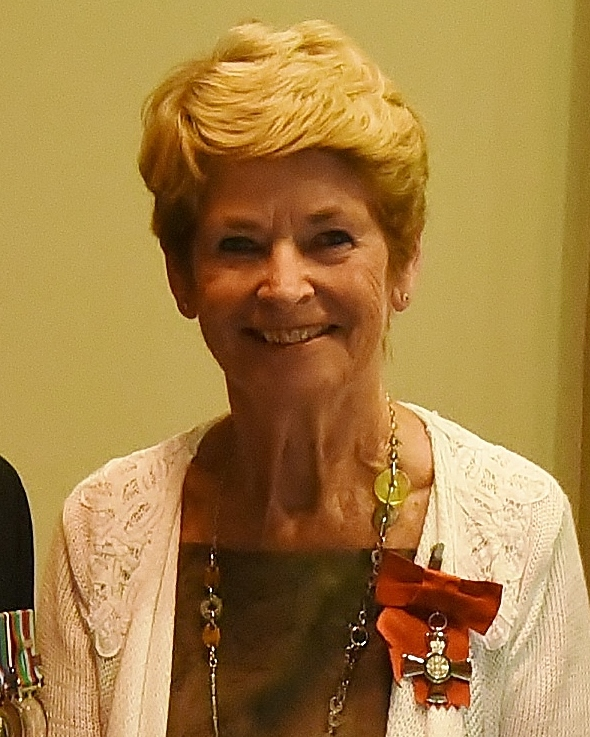
Dawn Morrison

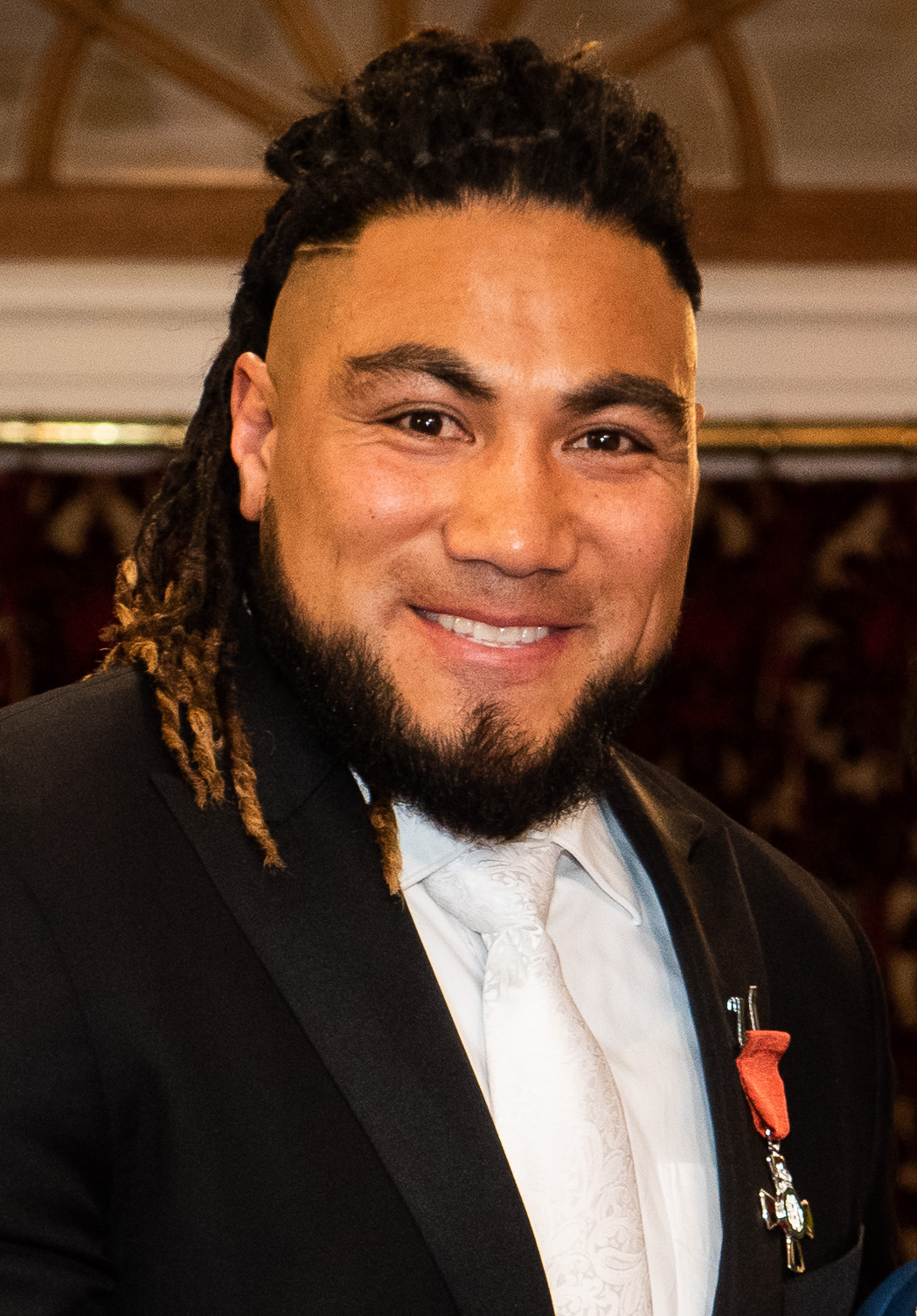
Ma'a Nonu

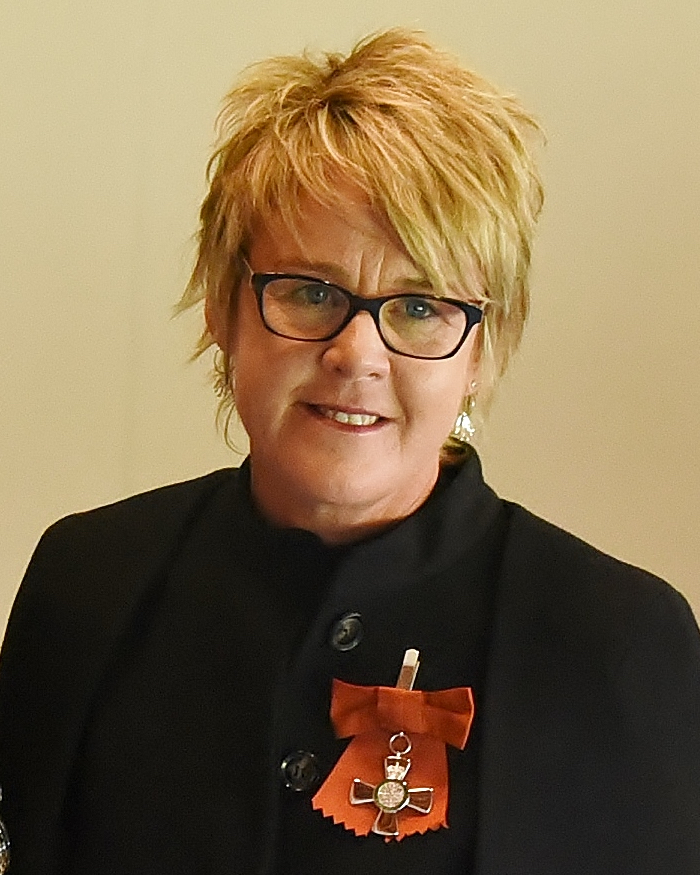
Jane Patterson

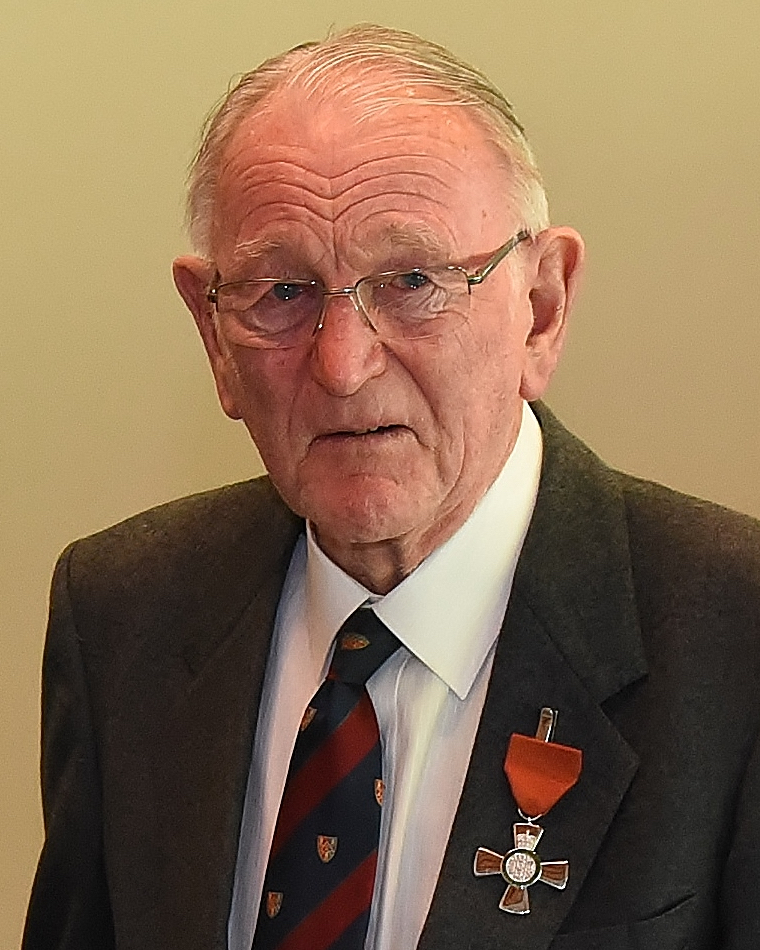
Phil Ryall

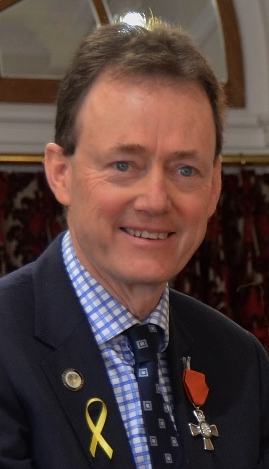
Colin Smith

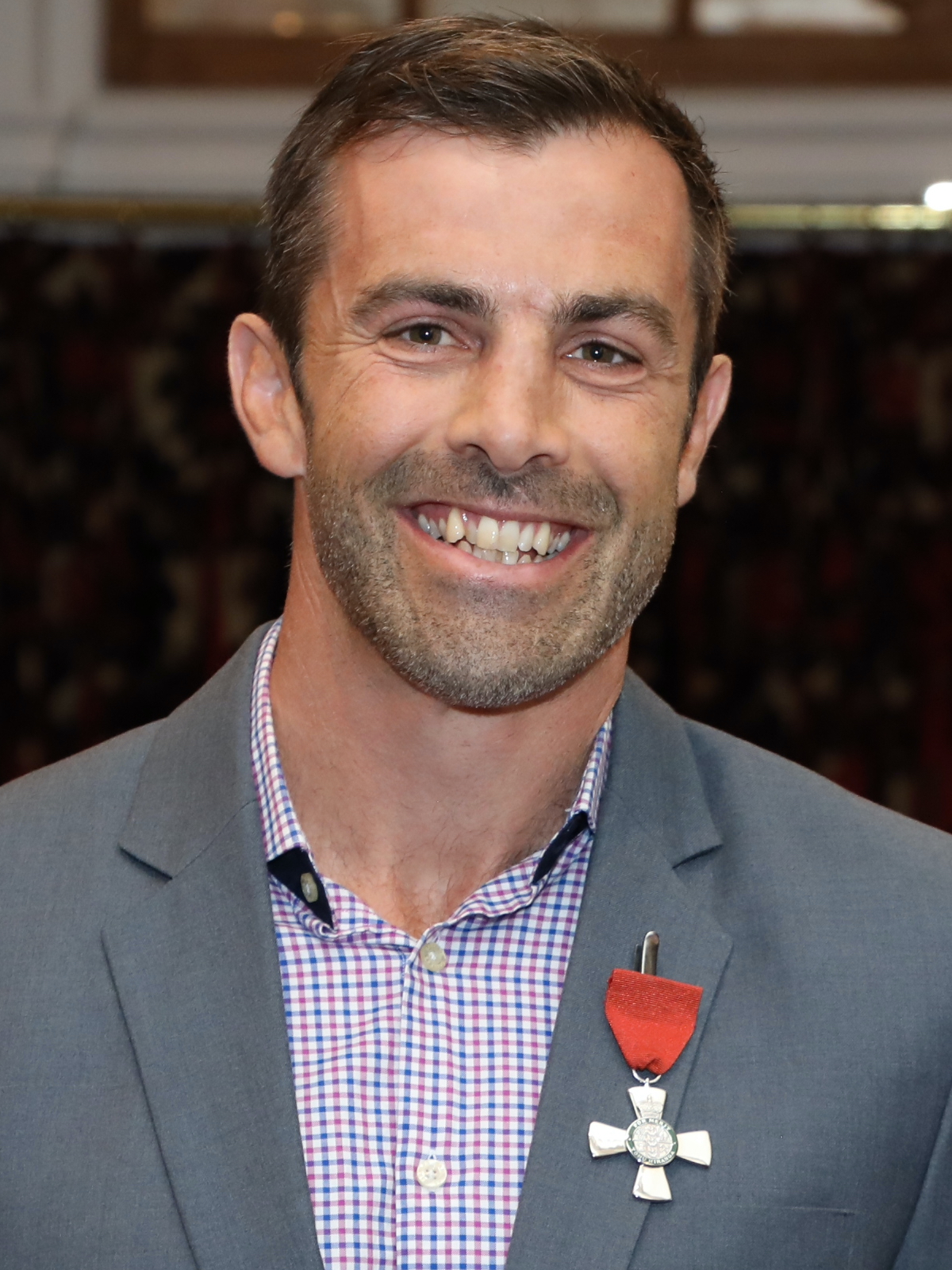
Conrad Smith

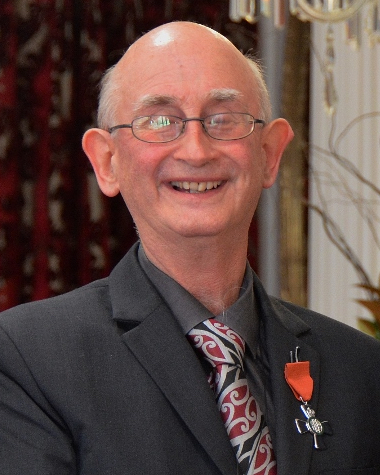
Lee Stevens

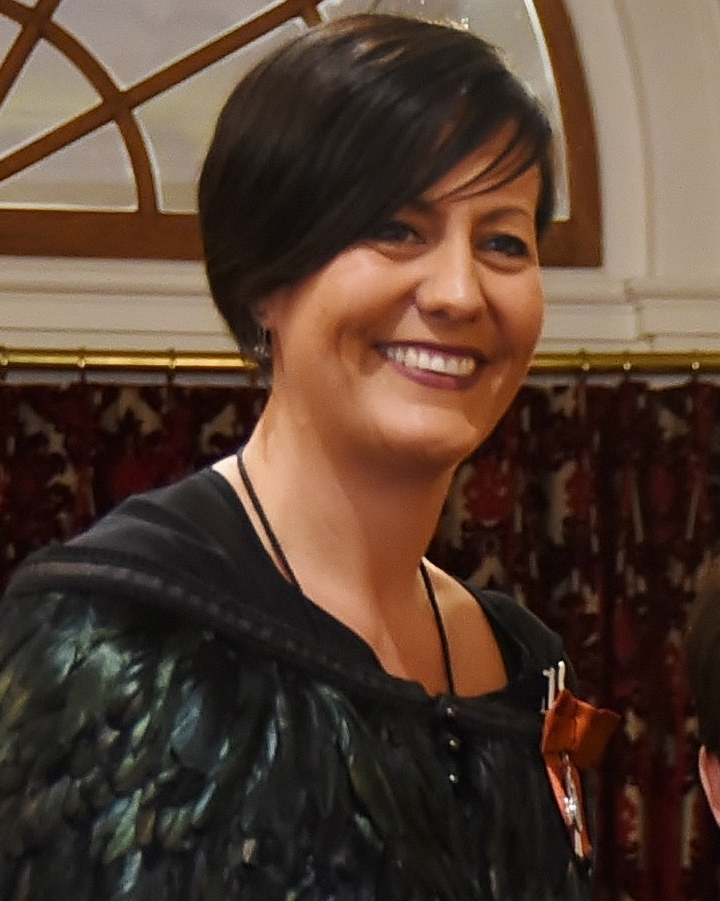
Rachel Taulelei

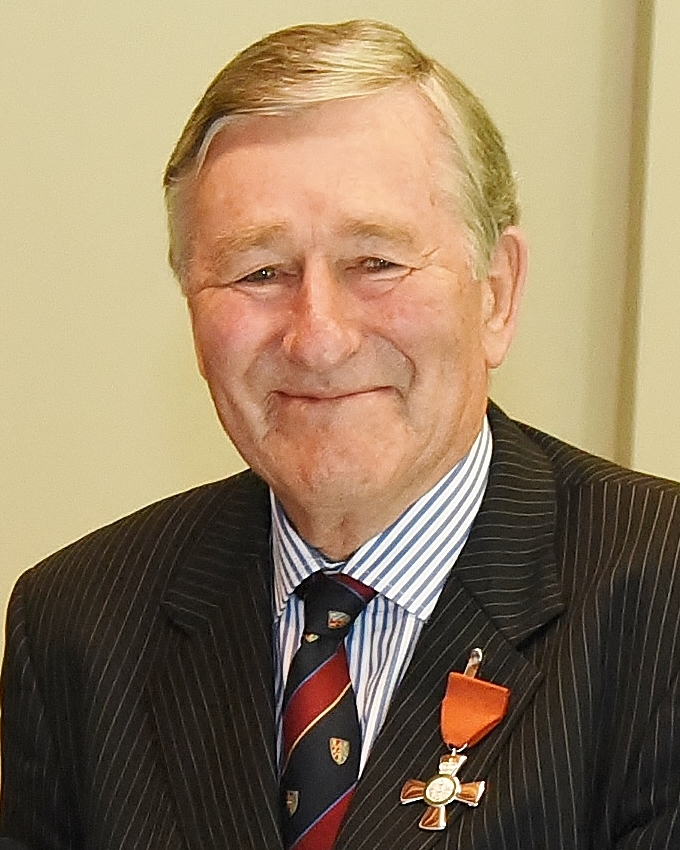
John Taylor

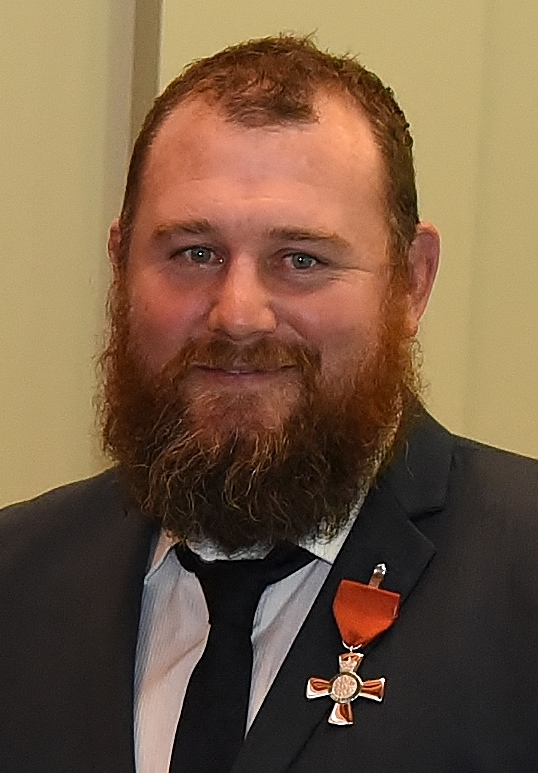
Tony Woodcock

== Companion of the Queen's Service Order (QSO) ==
- Judge Leslie Herrick Atkins QC – of Palmerston North. For services to the judiciary.
- Sandra Joy Clare Beatie – of Paraparaumu. For services to the State.
- Geoffrey Mark Dangerfield – of Lower Hutt. For services to the State.
- Heta Kenneth Hingston – of Rotorua. For services to Māori and the judiciary.
- Judge David James Robert Holderness – of Christchurch. For services to the judiciary and the community.
- Judge John James Dashwood Strettell – of Queenstown. For services to the judiciary.
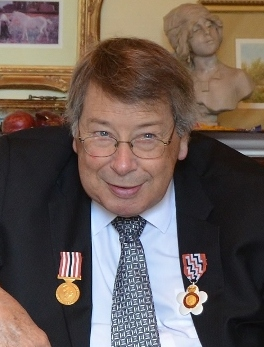
Les Atkins

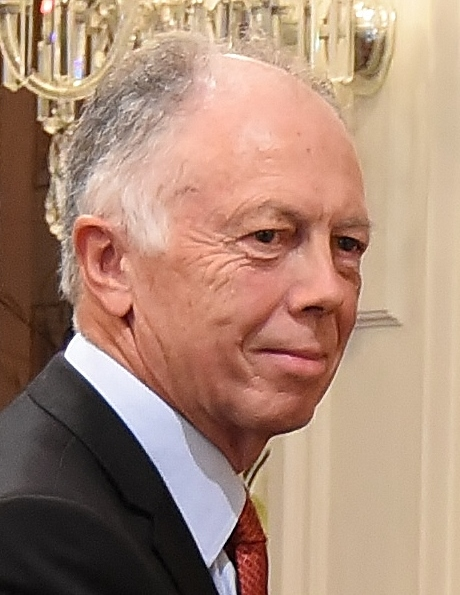
Geoff Dangerfield

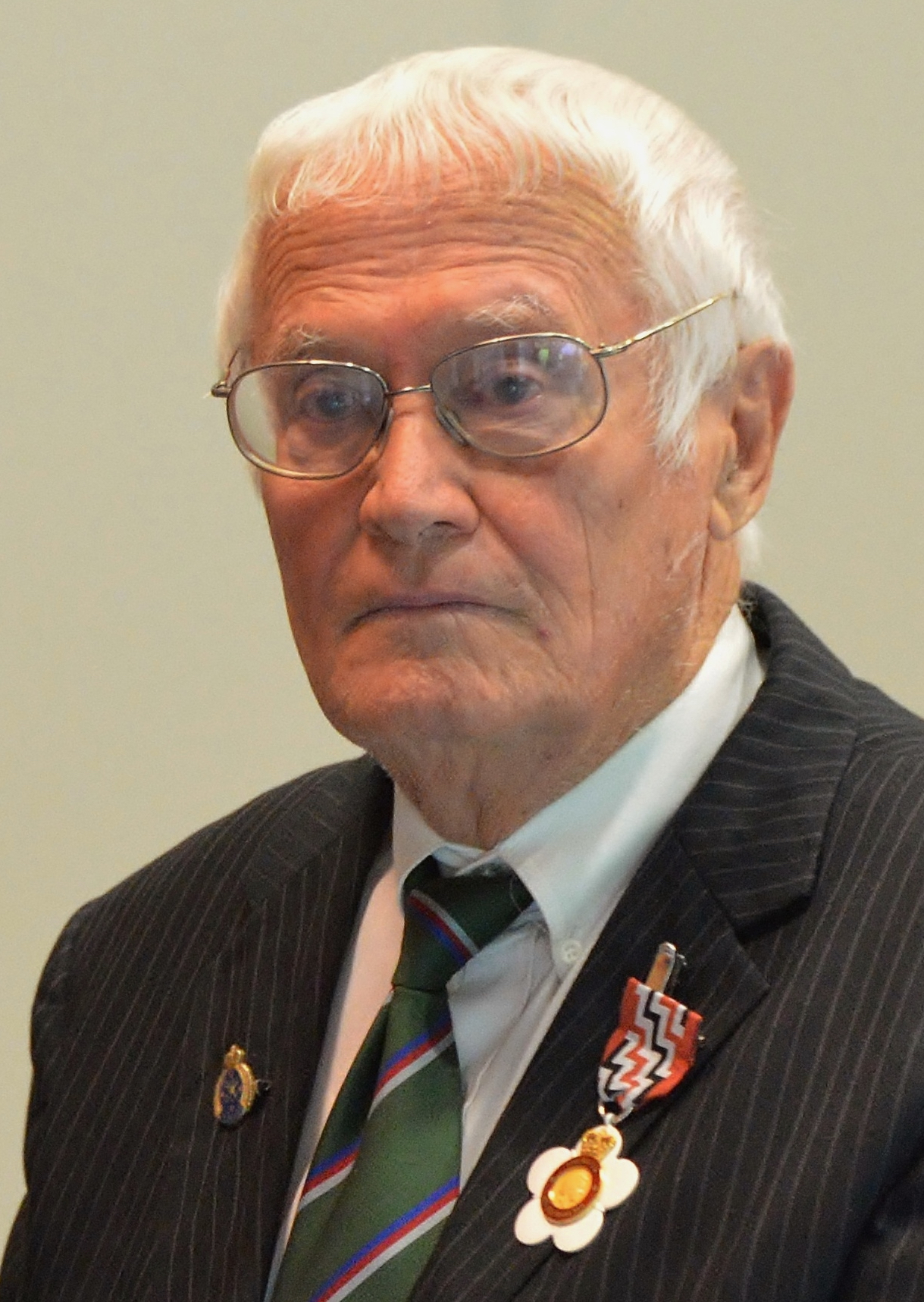
Heta Hingston

== Queen's Service Medal (QSM) ==
- Jane Morice Barraud Aim – of Wellington. For services to the community.
- David Graham Martin Allerton – of Urenui. For services to the New Zealand Fire Service and sailing.
- Diane Mary Ammundsen – of Paraparaumu. For services to the community.
- Fiona Jane Anderson – of Auckland. For services to the community.
- Hannah Estelle Benda – of Lower Hutt. For services to the Jewish community and women.
- Hilary Anne Brown – of Taupō. For services to the community and public speaking.
- Douglas Frederick Callahan – of Gisborne. For services to trampolining.
- Billie Nelson Walter Hector Chote – of Ashhurst. For services to education.
- Mary-Anne Mereana Crawford JP – of Tolaga Bay. For services to the community.
- Bruce William Peter Cronin JP – of Tauranga. For services to the community.
- Rodger Leslie Curtice – of Auckland. For services to surf life-saving.
- Kenneth Gordon Davidson – of Otautau. For services to the community.
- Mary Davies – of Waipukurau. For services to music.
- Garry John Donnithorne – of Christchurch. For services to the community.
- Kevin James Drummond – of Waiuku. For services to the New Zealand Fire Service.
- Jennifer Marion Edwards – of Whitianga. For services to people with cancer.
- Judith Ann Faris – of Alexandra. For services to music and the community.
- Noeline Helen Farley – of Auckland. For services to the community.
- Ross Bernard Frisby – of Auckland. For services to football.
- Sheila Gasparich – of Whangaparāoa. For services to the community.
- Maurice James Gerrand – of Huntly. For services to the community.
- Valma Eunice Hallam – of Tauranga. For services to people with Alzheimer's and dementia.
- Bronwyn Sadie Hanna – of Whakatāne. For services to the New Zealand Cadet Forces.
- Kathleen Ann Hansen – of Auckland. For services to historical research.
- Kataraina Hodge – of Te Awamutu. For services to Māori.
- Michael George Kelly – of Whangamatā. For services to the community.
- Sister Thirza Margaret Lancaster – of Wellington. For services to the community.
- Alan Barry Mackintosh – of Gisborne. For services to the community.
- Honora Mary Martelletti JP – of Matamata. For services to the community.
- Shefali Mehta JP – of Auckland. For services to the Indian community.
- Wayne David Moultrie – of Mt Maunganui. For services to the community.
- Anne Murray – of Whanganui. For services to the community.
- Gillian Mary Nicholas – of Rotorua. For services to the community.
- Graham William Painter – of Auckland. For services to the community.
- Jeffrey George Percival – of Rotorua. For services to scouting.
- Malcolm Ross Plimmer – of Palmerston North. For services to the community.
- Brian Edward Powell – of Blenheim. For services to heritage preservation and the community.
- Anne Marie Rotarangi-Kendall – of Auckland. For services to Māori and the community.
- Gwenda May Ruegg – of Whakatāne. For services to swimming and theatre.
- Carol Patricia Seymour – of Takapau. For services to the community.
- William Wallace Simmers – of Wellington. For services to the community.
- Dr Cecilia Casware Smith-Hamel – of Timaru. For services to mental health.
- Mary Diana Stanley-Shepherd – of Christchurch. For services to dance and the community.
- Hola Ki Ha'amea Lavakei'aho Toki Taue – of Auckland. For services to the Pacific community.
- Iris Thomas – of Tauranga. For services to sport and the community.
- Janet Grace Tucker – of Dunedin. For services to the community.
- Te Uranga O Te Ra Tuwhakairiora Tuhaka – of Gisborne. For services to veterans and the community.
- Lani Tupu JP – of Martinborough. For services to the Pacific community.
- Ian Frank Warren – of Christchurch. For services to health and the community.
- Kathleen Bonde Williams – of Rotorua. For services to senior citizens and the community.
- Diane Ellen Gray Wilson JP – of Auckland. For services to genealogy and the community.
- Robin Wynne-Williams – of Christchurch. For services to mental health support.
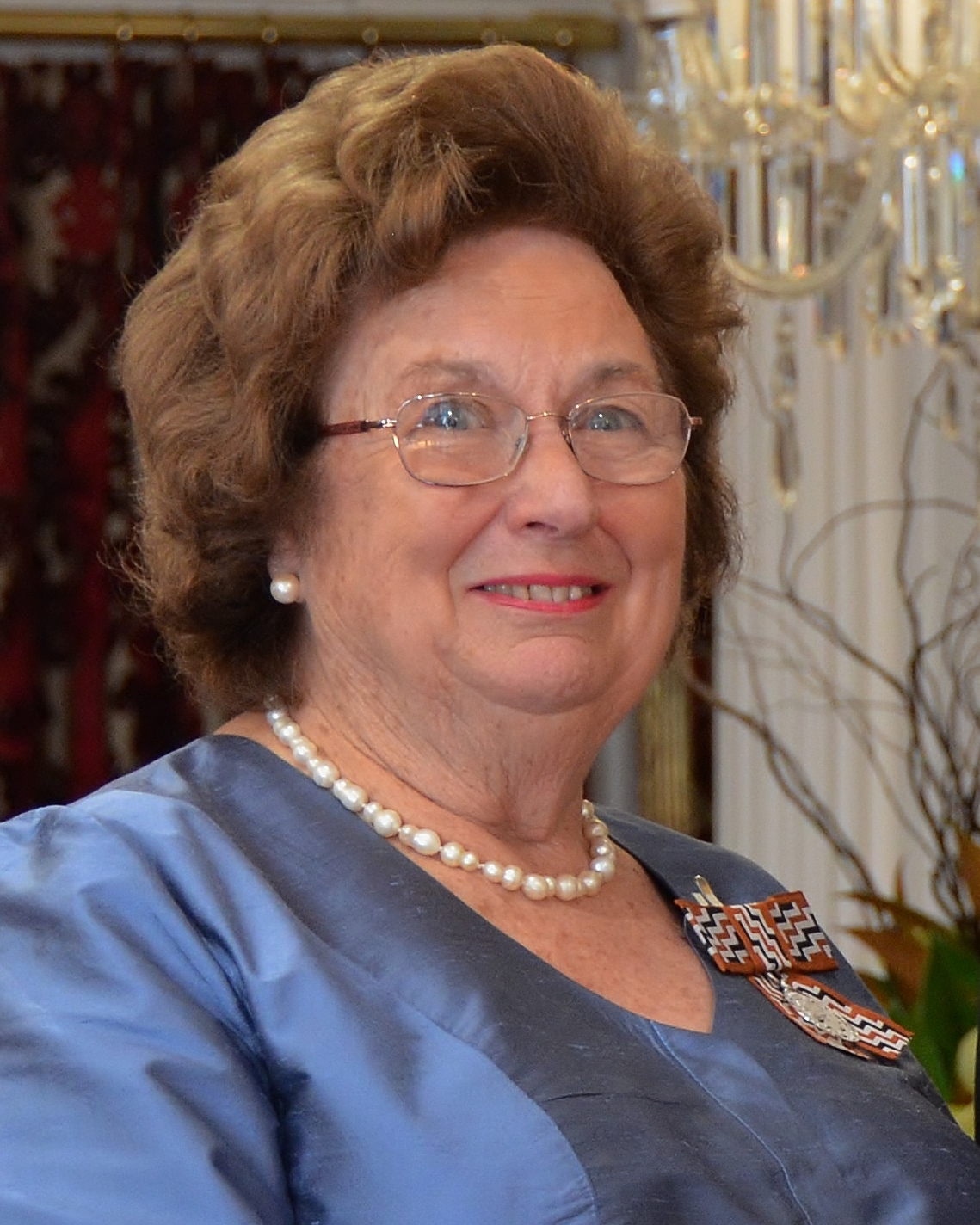
Jane Aim

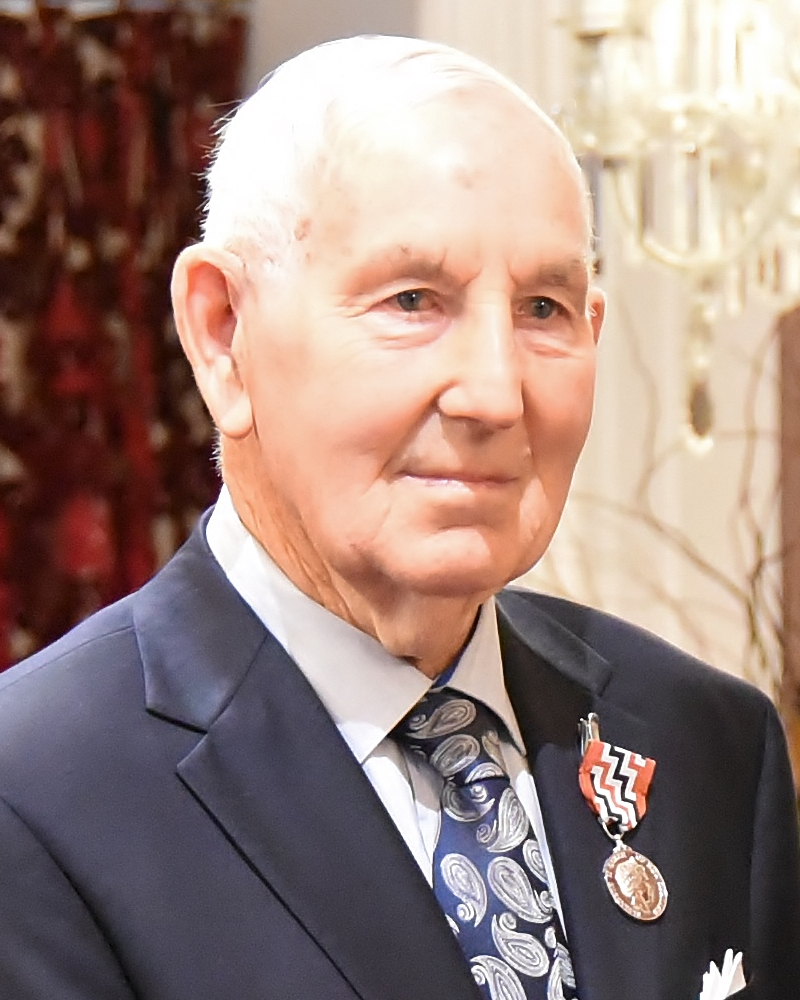
Ken Davidson

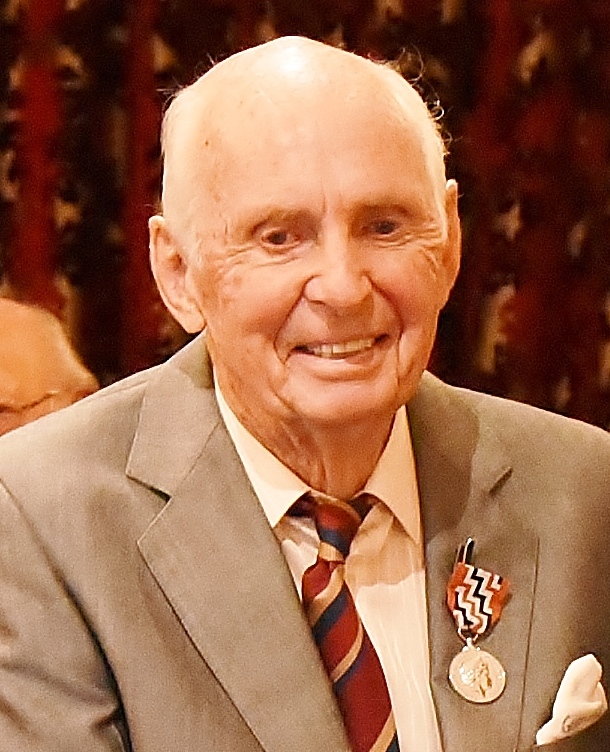
Alan Mackintosh

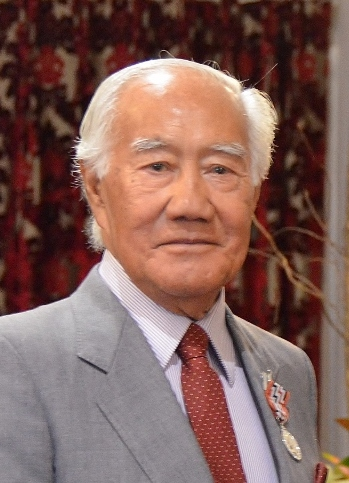
Lani Tupu

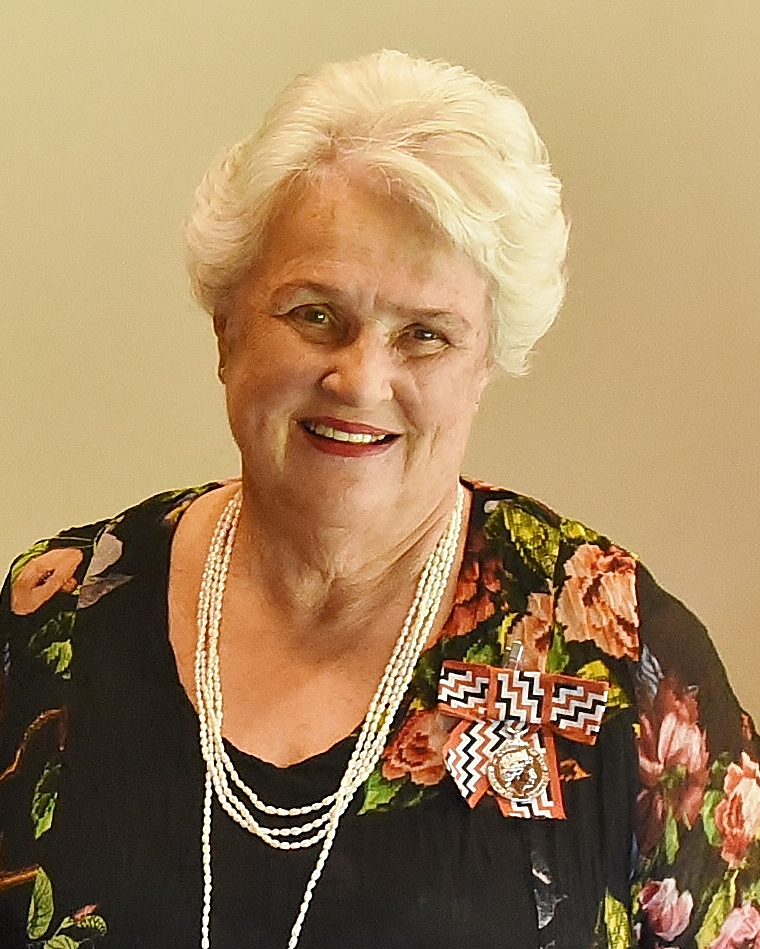
Diane Wilson

== New Zealand Distinguished Service Decoration (DSD) ==
- Commander Louisa Ann Gritt – of Auckland. For services to the New Zealand Defence Force.
- Chief Petty Officer Anthony Nickel – of Auckland. For services to the New Zealand Defence Force.
- Wing Commander Andrew John Scott – of Porirua. For services to the New Zealand Defence Force.
