= Fiona Te Momo =

New Zealand Māori development professor

- Born: 1966

Academic background
- Education: University of Waikato
- Thesis: Demystifying a relationship between voluntary work and Māori (2003)
- Doctoral advisor: Barbara G Harrison, Maria Humphries, Russell Bishop

Oliver Helena Fiona Te Momo is a New Zealand social worker and academic, and is a full professor at Massey University, specialising in Māori development.

== Academic career ==
Te Momo is affiliated with Ngāti Raukawa, Ngāti Porou, Ngāti Whakatere, and Ngāti Konohi. She is a registered social worker, and completed a Master in Māori and Pacific Development with Honours, and then a PhD titled Demystifying a relationship between voluntary work and Māori at the University of Waikato. Her doctoral thesis was supervised by Barbara Harrison, Maria Humphries and Russell Bishop. Te Momo then joined the faculty of Massey University, rising to full professor in 2024.

Te Momo is the Regional Director for the College of Humanities and Social Sciences on the Auckland campus of Massey University. Te Momo's research focuses on indigenous knowledge development, which encompasses social, economic and political development at the whanau, hapu and iwi levels. Te Momo has researched the cultural competency of social workers, micro-financing for hapū initiatives, and leadership by indigenous women.

In 2018 she was asked to comment on whether fragrances being sold by an Italian creator in Russia, using Māori branding and Pasifika imagery, represented a case of cultural appropriation.

In 2011, Te Momo was awarded a Massey University Māori Award. The award enabled her to undertake a research project called 'Future Cultural Social Workers', where she investigated the cultural knowledge of social work students at Massey and at the University of Hawai'i at Manoa.

== Selected works ==
- O H Fiona Te Momo (2007). "Biotechnology: the language of multiple views in Māori communities". Biotechnology Journal. 2 (9): 1179–1183. doi:10.1002/biot.200700123. PMID 17703491. Wikidata Q50933481.
- Fiona Te Momo (2022). "Māori Academic Challenges: Delivering Mātauranga Māori During COVID-19". Journal of Contemporary Issues in Education. 17 (2): 67–78. doi:10.20355/jcie29511. Wikidata Q124414047.
- O H Fiona Te Momo (2007). "Biotechnology: the language of multiple views in Māori communities". Biotechnology Journal. 2 (9): 1179–1183. doi:10.1002/biot.200700123. PMID 17703491. Wikidata Q50933481.
- Shelly Johnson; Fiona Te Momo; Natalie Clark; Corrina Sparrow; Reina Hapi (2021). "Contested Context: Welcoming Diverse International Indigenous Colleagues to Unceded Musqueam Territory". Canadian Journal of Native Education. 37 (1). doi:10.14288/cjne.v37i1.196566. Wikidata Q124414027.
- Fiona Te Momo (2021). "Turangawaewae: Retaining Tino Rangatiranga in the Academy". Canadian Journal of Native Education. 37 (1). doi:10.14288/cjne.v37i1.196568. Wikidata Q124414042.
