= Russell Bishop (academic) =

New Zealand academic

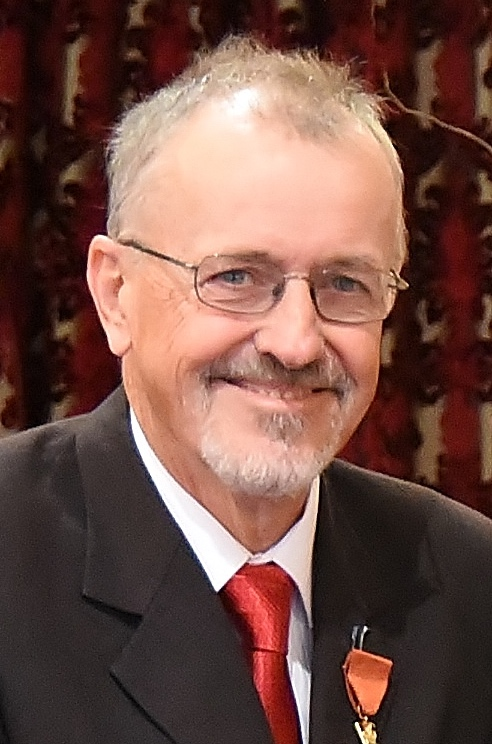
- Bishop at his investiture in 2016 as an Officer of the New Zealand Order of Merit, given by the governor-general, Sir Jerry Mateparae
- Born: Alan Russell Bishop
- Occupation: Academic
- Employer: University of Waikato
- Title: Professor of Māori Education
- Awards: Officer of the New Zealand Order of Merit (2016)

Academic background
- Education: University of Otago (PhD)
- Thesis: Collaborative research stories : whakawhanaungatanga (1995)
- Influences: Ted Glynn

Academic work
- Discipline: Māori education education
- Sub-discipline: Culturally-appropriate pedagogy, Te Ao Māori, Mātauranga Māori, Kaupapa Māori
- School or tradition: Kaupapa Māori praxis
- Doctoral students: Fiona Te Momo
- Main interests: Indigenous self-determination, kotahitanga and tikanga in classrooms, collaborative research
- Notable ideas: Te Kotahitanga, Teaching to the North-East, Leading to the North-East, whakawhanaungatanga as a research metaphor

Alan Russell Bishop ONZM commonly known as Russell Bishop is a New Zealand academic. He is a professor of Māori education at the University of Waikato, and the director of Te Kotahitanga, a research programme.

== Early life and education ==
He has a PhD from the University of Otago, where he was employed as a lecturer from 1990 in a joint position in the Māori Studies programme and the education department.

== Career ==
He co-authored Culture Counts: Changing Power Relations in Education (ISBN 1842773364) with Ted Glynn, another University of Waikato professor who had been his doctoral advisor. Notable doctoral students of Bishop's include Fiona Te Momo, professor at Massey University.

In the 2016 New Year Honours, Bishop was appointed an Officer of the New Zealand Order of Merit for services to Māori and education.
