= Pamela Andrews =

Retired High Court of New Zealand judge

The Honourable Pamela Andrews CNZM
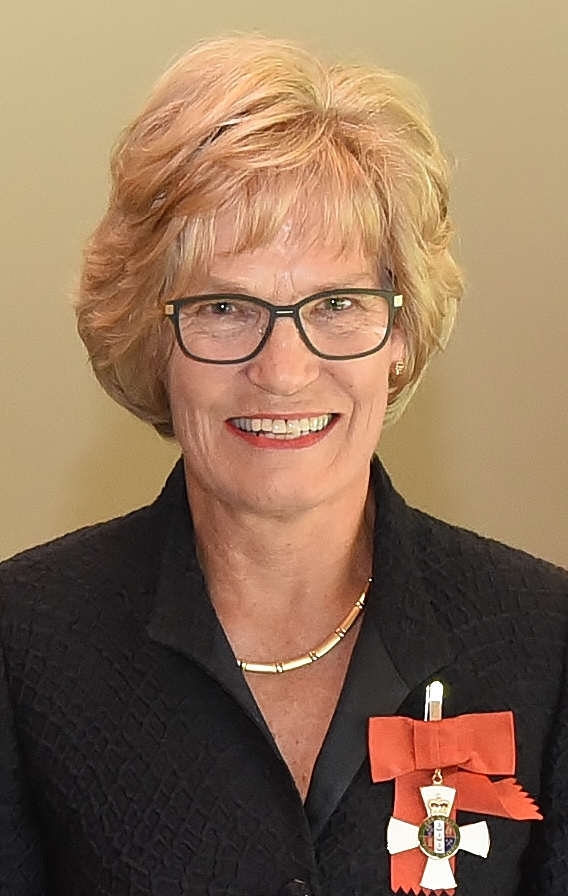
- Andrews in 2016

Judge of the High Court of New Zealand
- In office 2006 – September 2015

Chairperson of the Real Estate Agents Disciplinary Tribunal
- In office May 2016 – 2019

Personal details
- Education: Victoria University of Wellington (LLB, 1983)
- Occupation: Lawyer

Pamela Jean Andrews CNZM is a retired New Zealand judge and lawyer. She served on the High Court of New Zealand from 2006 to 2015.

== Career ==
Andrews graduated from Victoria University of Wellington with an LLB in 1983, having previously worked as a writer and journalist at the Consumers' Institute, and for the Ministry of Foreign Affairs between 1968 and 1973. She worked at law firm Luke Cunningham and Clere, before joining Kensington Swan (later acquired by Dentons) in 1985 and being made a partner in 1988.

Andrews served as a member of the Refugee Status Appeals Authority, resigning in 2006 upon her appointment to the High Court. She sat on the bench of the High Court in Auckland for nine years, until retiring in 2015. She then chaired the Real Estate Agents Disciplinary Tribunal from May 2016 to 2019.

== Honours ==
Andrews was appointed a Companion of the New Zealand Order of Merit, for services to the judiciary, in the 2016 New Year Honours, and was invested with the honour on 27 April 2016.
