= Ross Morrison =

New Zealand cricketer and tennis administrator (1937–2025)

Ross Morrison MNZM
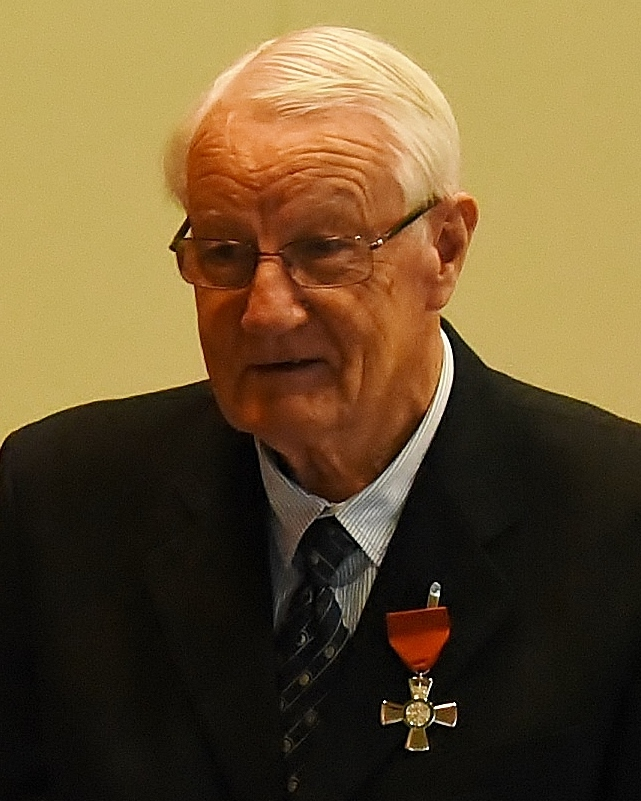
- Morrison in 2016

Personal information
- Full name: Alexander Ross Morrison
- Born: 23 September 1937; Auckland, New Zealand
- Died: 9 December 2025 (aged 88)
- Batting: Right handed

Career statistics
Competition	First-class
Matches	10
Runs scored	322
Batting average	18.94
100s/50s	0/1
Top score	53
Catches/stumpings	15/–
- Source: ESPNcricinfo, 19 June 2016

Alexander Ross Morrison MNZM (23 September 1937 – 9 December 2025) was a New Zealand cricketer and tennis administrator.

== Cricket career ==
Born at Auckland in 1937, Morrison played for Auckland teams before making his first-class debut against Canterbury in December 1965. A middle-order batsman, he played ten first-class matches for the side, five each during the 1965–66 and 1966–67 seasons, scoring 322 runs. His only half-century, a score of 53, came against Northern Districts in January 1966.

== Tennis administration ==
A tennis player from the 1960s, Morrison also became active in the sport as an administrator. He served as chair of the North Shore Tennis Association for 20 years from 1987; during his tenure, the association's courts at Forrest Hill were redeveloped, and he led the development of six hectares (15 acres) of land at Albany to create Albany Tennis Park, New Zealand's largest tennis complex. Morrison was instrumental in the establishment of the trust that owns and operates Albany Tennis Park, and served as its chair from 2000 to 2014. Between 2003 and 2007, he was chief executive of Tennis Northern.

Morrison made contributions to tennis as an umpire and tournament official. He was a referee for many tournaments, and served on the boards of both the Auckland and New Zealand Tennis Umpires Associations. He was involved in the organisation of international tournaments in New Zealand, including ITF-sanctioned tournaments, Davis Cup ties, and the tennis tournament for the 9th World Masters Games in 2017, staged at Albany Tennis Park.

== Honours and awards ==
In the 2016 New Year Honours, Morrison was appointed a Member of the New Zealand Order of Merit, for services to tennis. His wife, Dawn, was accorded the same honour in that honours list.

In 2023, both Ross and Dawn Morrison were inaugural recipients of Te Tohu Hāpai from Tennis New Zealand, in recognition of their voluntary contributions to tennis in New Zealand over several decades.

== Death ==
Morrison died on 9 December 2025, at the age of 88.
