= Biotechnology Journal =

- Discipline: Biotechnology
- Language: English
- Edited by: Alois Jungbauer, Sang Yup Lee

Publication details
- History: 2006-present
- Publisher: Wiley-Blackwell
- Frequency: Monthly
- Impact factor: 3.543 (2018)

Standard abbreviations
- ISO 4: Biotechnol. J.

Indexing
- CODEN: BJIOAM
- ISSN: 1860-7314 (print); 1860-6768 (web)
- LCCN: 2006205072
- OCLC no.: 62770111

Links
- Journal homepage; Online access; Online archive

The Biotechnology Journal is a peer-reviewed scientific journal covering all aspects of biotechnology.

== Abstracting and indexing ==
The journal is abstracted and indexed in:

- Elsevier BIOBASE
- Biological Abstracts
- BIOSIS Previews
- Biotechnology & Bioengineering Abstracts
- CAB Abstracts
- CAB HEALTH
- CABDirect
- Chemical Abstracts Service
- ChemInform
- CSA Biological Sciences Database
- CSA Environmental Sciences & Pollution Management Database
- EMBASE
- Global Health
- Index Medicus/MEDLINE/PubMed
- Science Citation Index Expanded
- Scopus

According to the Journal Citation Reports, the journal has a 2012 impact factor of 3.446.
