= Gilbert Enoka =

New Zealand mental performance coach

Gilbert Enoka is a New Zealand mental performance coach who is well known for his work with the All Blacks, the Black Caps, Silver Ferns, Canterbury Crusaders, and Chelsea Football Club.

== Early life and education ==
Enoka was the youngest of six boys. He spent his childhood years in an orphanage. He became a PE teacher and represented New Zealand in volleyball on the side.

Enoka went to the University of Canterbury, there he completed a physical education and geography degrees, and gained first class honours in psychology. He played senior rugby as a lock or flanker for University B and was a Canterbury under-20 representative.

== Career ==
Enoka taught at Hillmorton High School. While there, he had a chance meeting with then All Black Wayne Smith when working as a teacher.When Smith moved into coaching he took Enoka with him. While at the All Blacks they became the first team to win consecutive Rugby World Cups. After working with the All Blacks for over 300 matches, Enoka moved into cricket with the England cricket team.

Following this he worked with other sports such as football, basketball, rugby league and netball.

In 2016, Enoka was made an Officer of the New Zealand Order of Merit for services to sport and psychology.

In February 2023, Enoka was brought on as a short-term consultant with Chelsea.

In the 2024 State of Origin series, Enoka was brought on by NSW coach Michael Maguire to consult the team. They came back from a 1-0 deficit to win the decisive game at Suncorp Stadium.

== Author ==
Enoka is the author of the best selling book Become Unstoppable.

== Personal ==
Enoka is married to Michelle and they have 2 children Ben and Jess.
