= 2010 New Year Honours (New Zealand) =

Annual awards for New Zealanders

- Previous: 2009 Special Honours; Next: 2010 Queen's Birthday Honours
- Type: New Zealand royal honours: Order of New Zealand; New Zealand Order of Merit; Queen's Service Order; Queen's Service Medal; New Zealand Antarctic Medal; New Zealand Distinguished Service Decoration
- Date: 31 December 2009
- Country: New Zealand
- Total recipients: 193

The 2010 New Year Honours in New Zealand were appointments by Elizabeth II in her right as Queen of New Zealand, on the advice of the New Zealand government, to various orders and honours to reward and highlight good works by New Zealanders, and to celebrate the passing of 2009 and the beginning of 2010. They were announced on 31 December 2009.

The recipients of honours are listed here as they were styled before their new honour.

== Order of New Zealand (ONZ) ==
Ordinary member

- The Right Honourable Helen Elizabeth Clark – of New York, United States of America, lately of Auckland. For services to New Zealand.
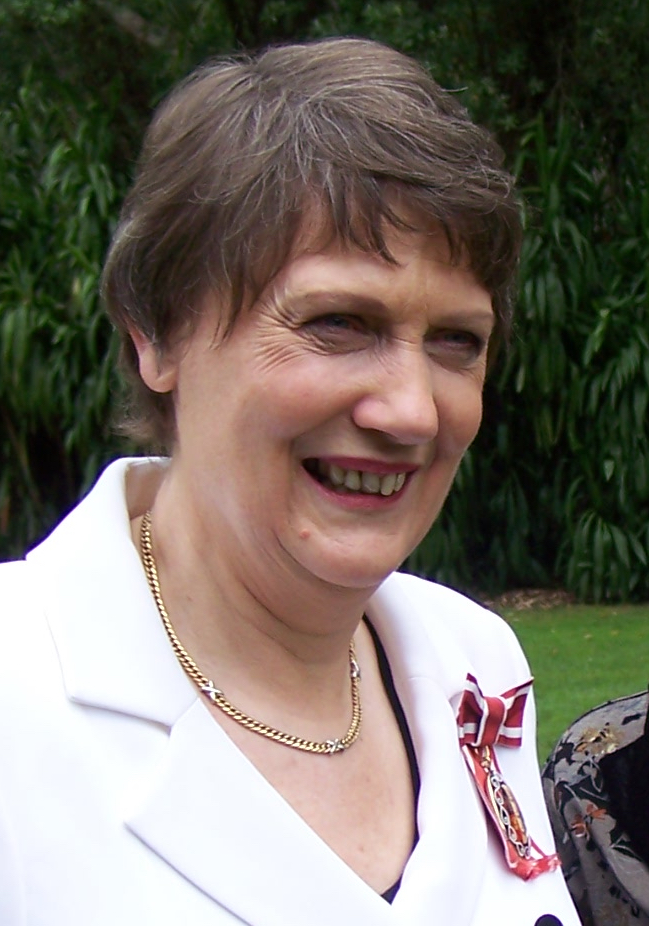
Helen Clark

== New Zealand Order of Merit ==
=== Dame Companion (DNZM) ===
- Lesley Max MBE – of Auckland. For services to children.
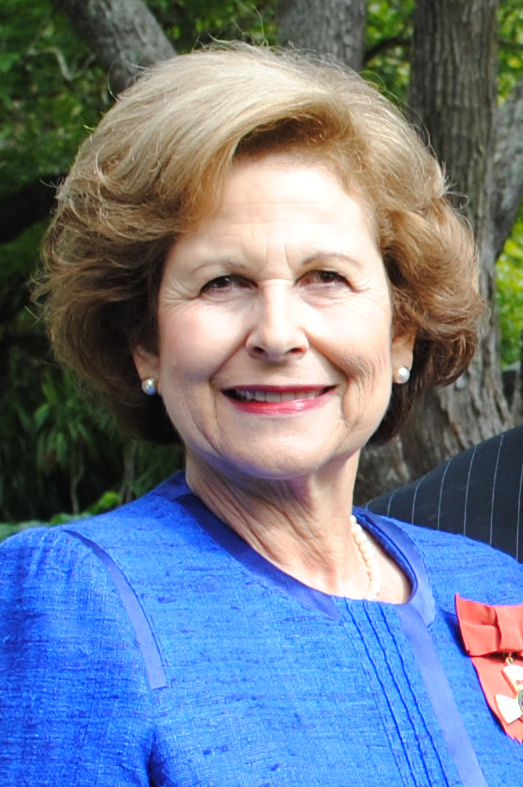
Dame Lesley Max

=== Knight Companion (KNZM) ===
- Professor Mason Harold Durie CNZM – of Feilding. For services to Māori health, in particular public health services.
- Peter Robert Jackson CNZM – of Wellington. For services to film.
- Arthur Douglas Myers CBE – of London, United Kingdom. For services to business and the community.
- The Honourable James Bruce Robertson – of Wellington. For services as a judge of the High Court of New Zealand and the Court of Appeal of New Zealand.

Honorary

- Julian H. Robertson – of New York, United States of America. For services to business and philanthropy.
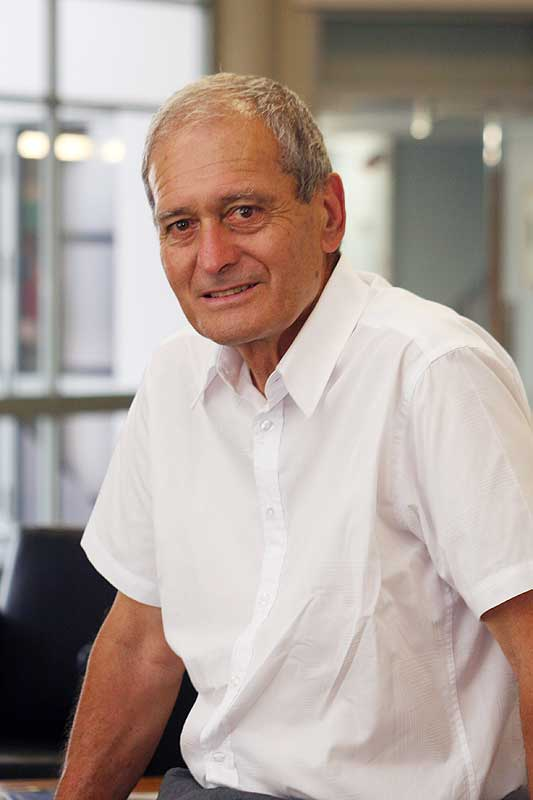
Sir Mason Durie

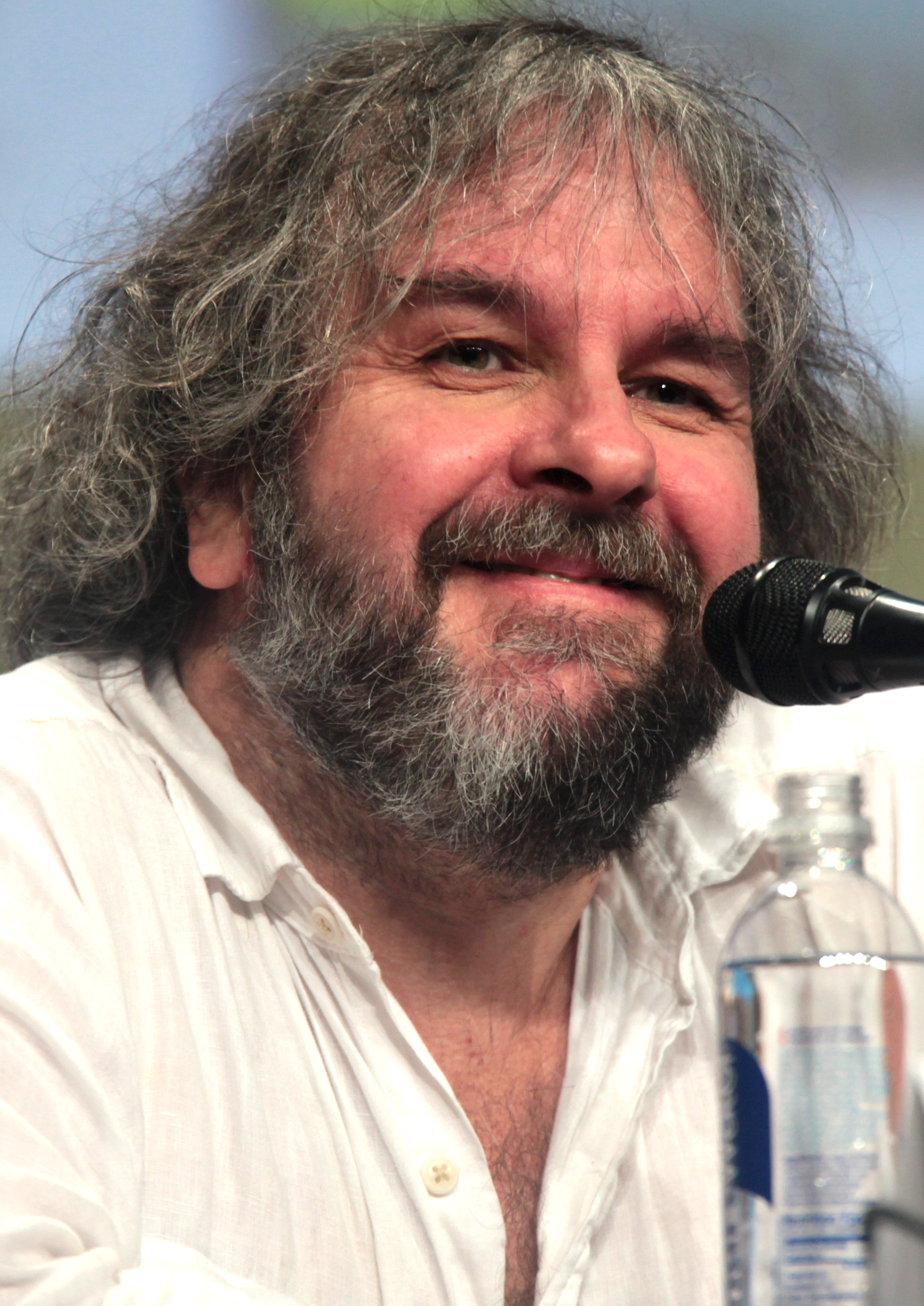
Sir Peter Jackson

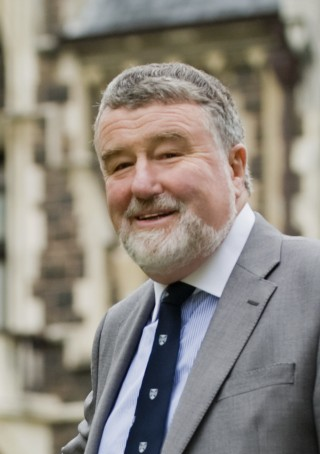
Sir Bruce Robertson

=== Companion (CNZM) ===
- Kevin Bernard Brady – of Wellington. For public services, lately as Controller and Auditor-General.
- Dr Peter Richard Fisher – of Auckland. For services to medicine.
- Dr Frederick Malcolm Graham – of Auckland. For services to medicine.
- Trevor Joseph Grice MNZM – of Ōtaki. For services to the community.
- George Winiata Henare OBE – of Auckland. For services to the theatre.
- Assistant Professor Merata Mita – of Whitianga. For services to the film industry.
- Hugh Richmond Lloyd Morrison – of Wellington. For services to business.
- Tewi David Rawiri Te Whare – of Rotorua. For services to Māori.
- Ian Campbell Templeton OBE – of Wellington. For services to journalism.
- Professor Helen Stapylton Timperley – of Auckland. For services to education.
- Neville Kenneth Wran AC QC – of Sydney, Australia. For services to New Zealand–Australia relations.
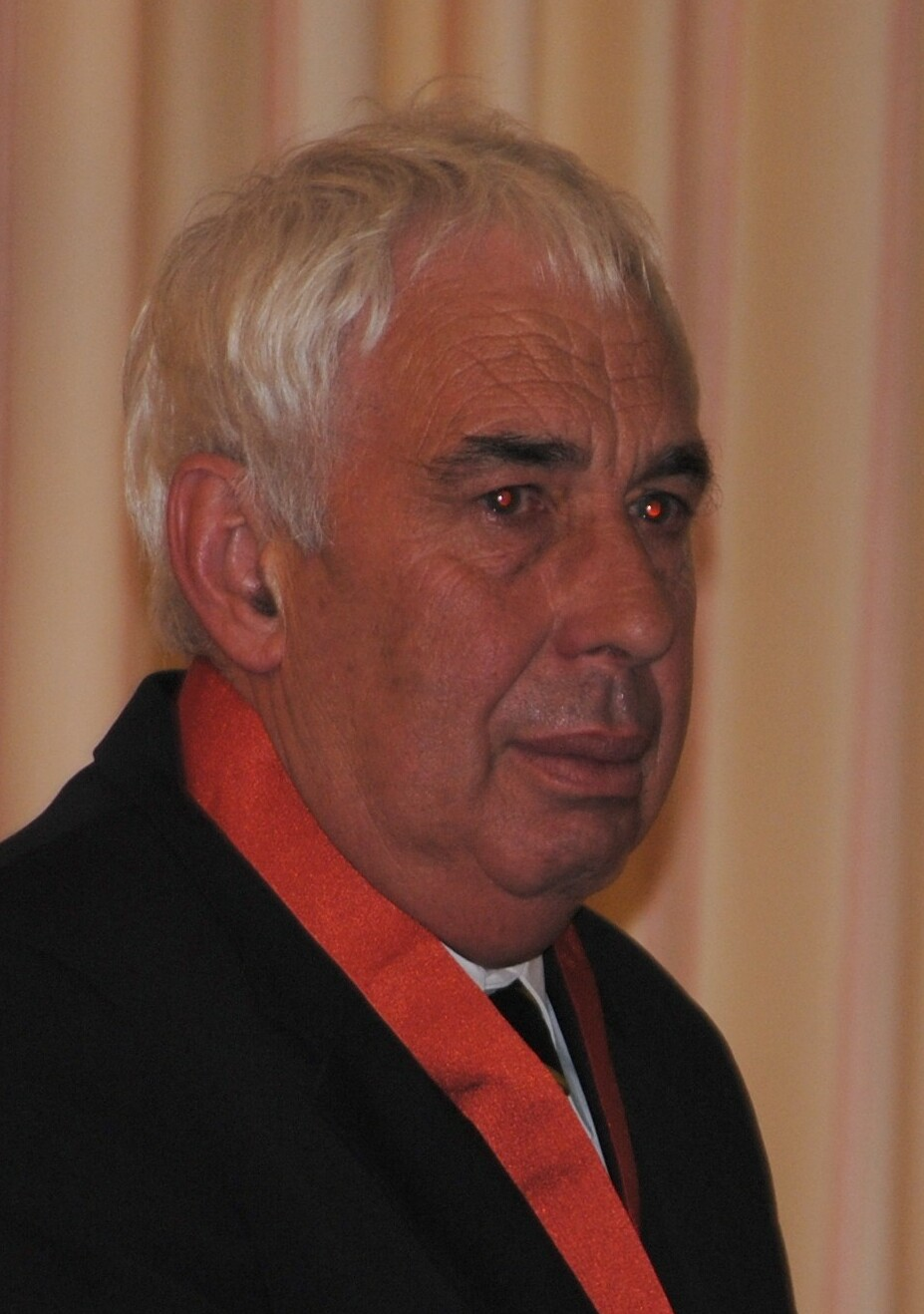
Kevin Brady

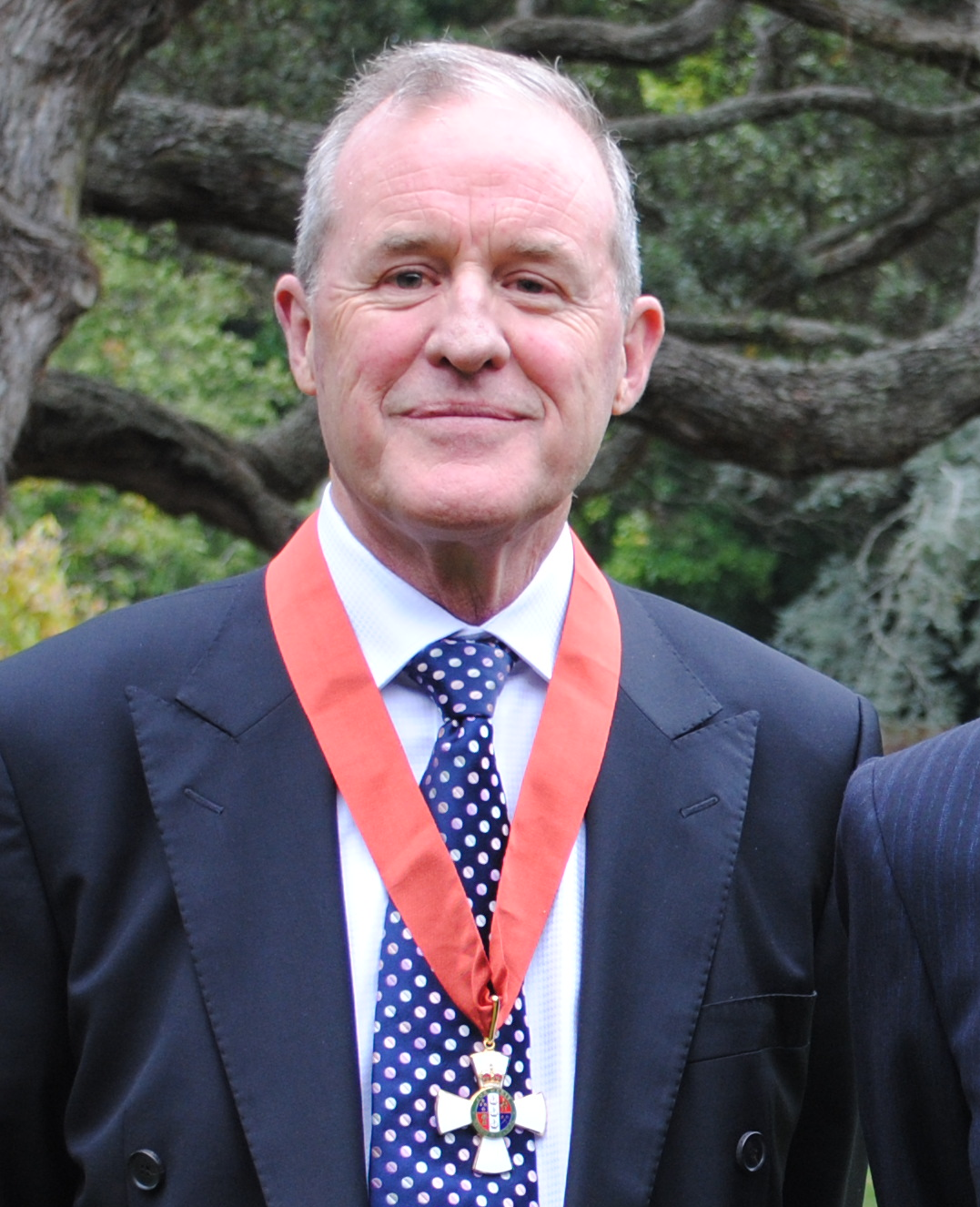
Richard Fisher

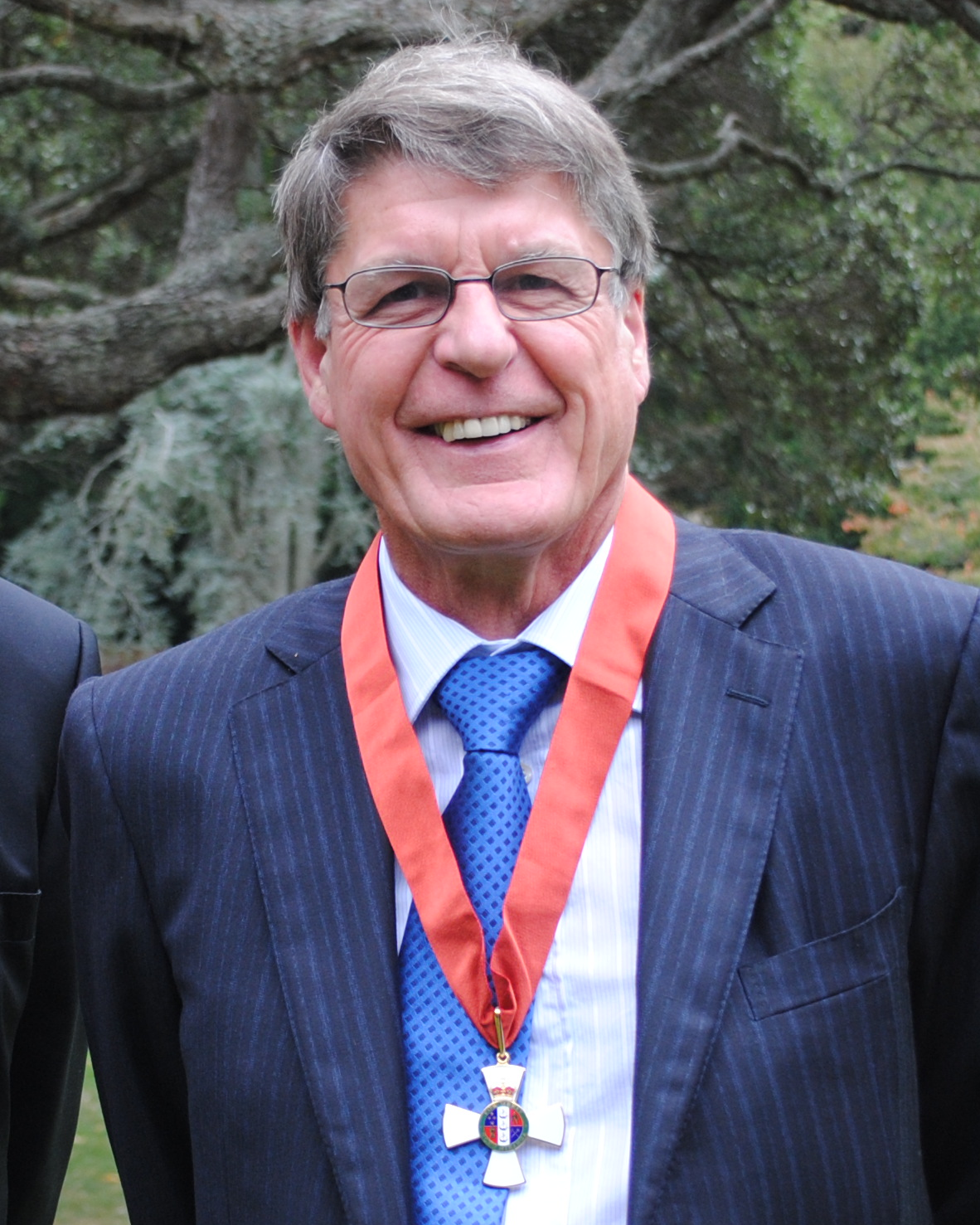
Freddie Graham

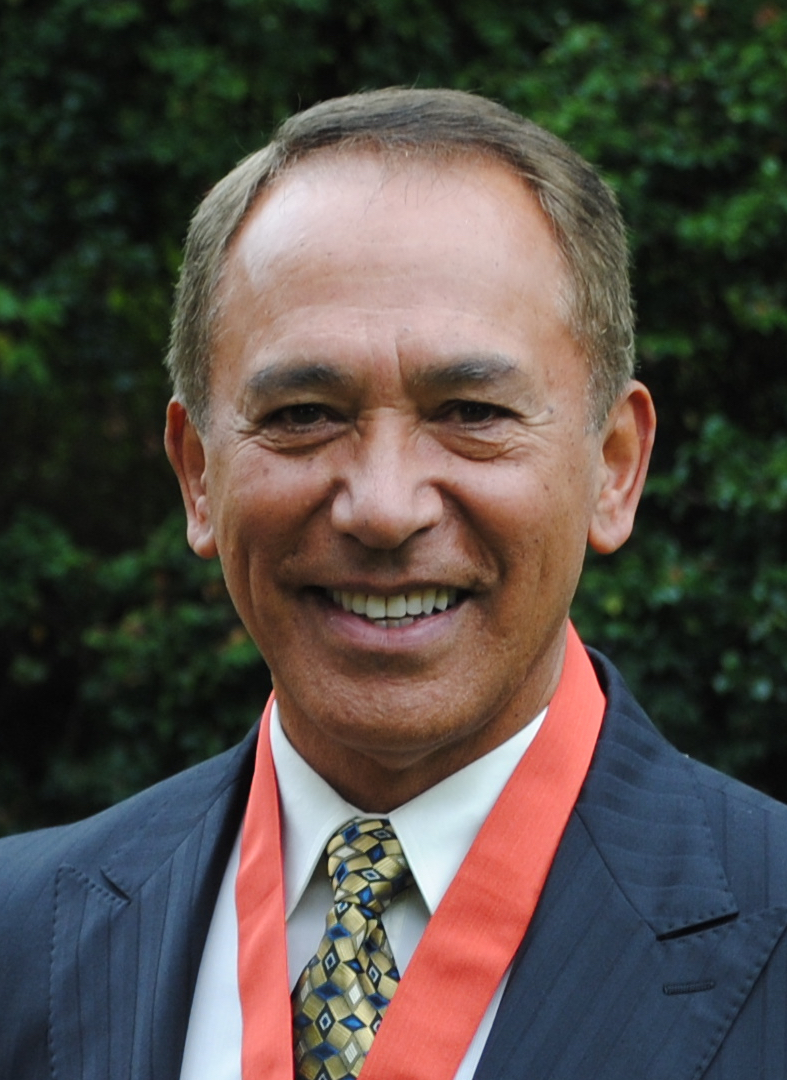
George Henare

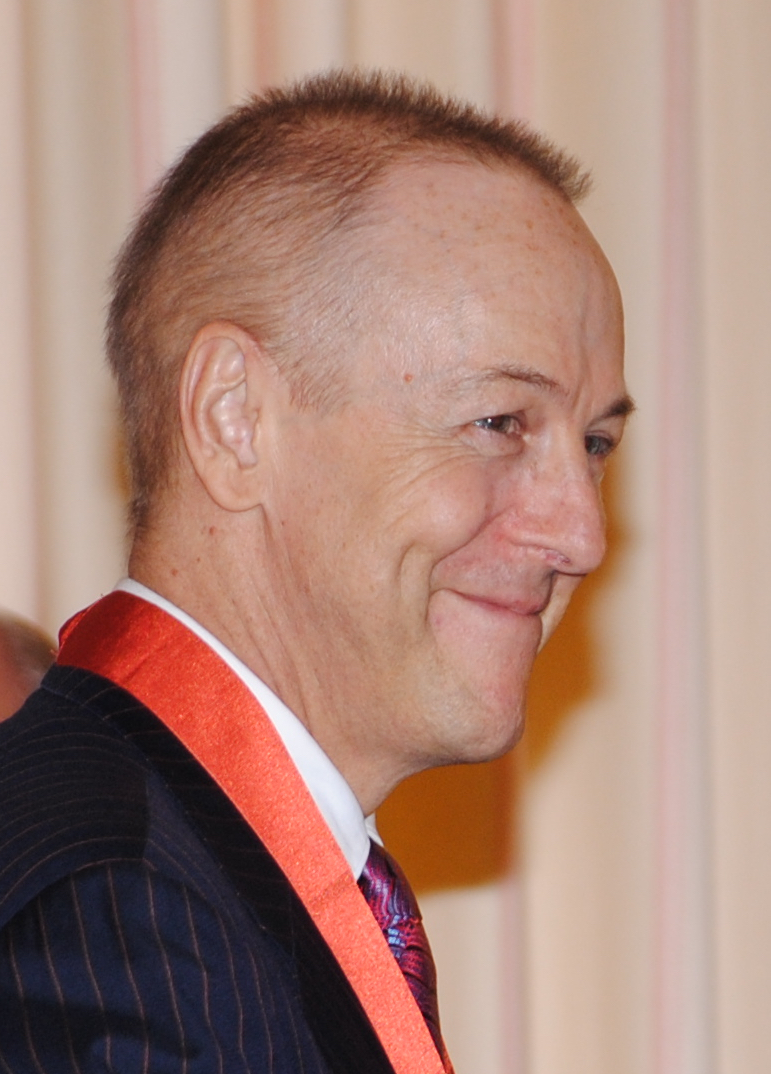
Lloyd Morrison

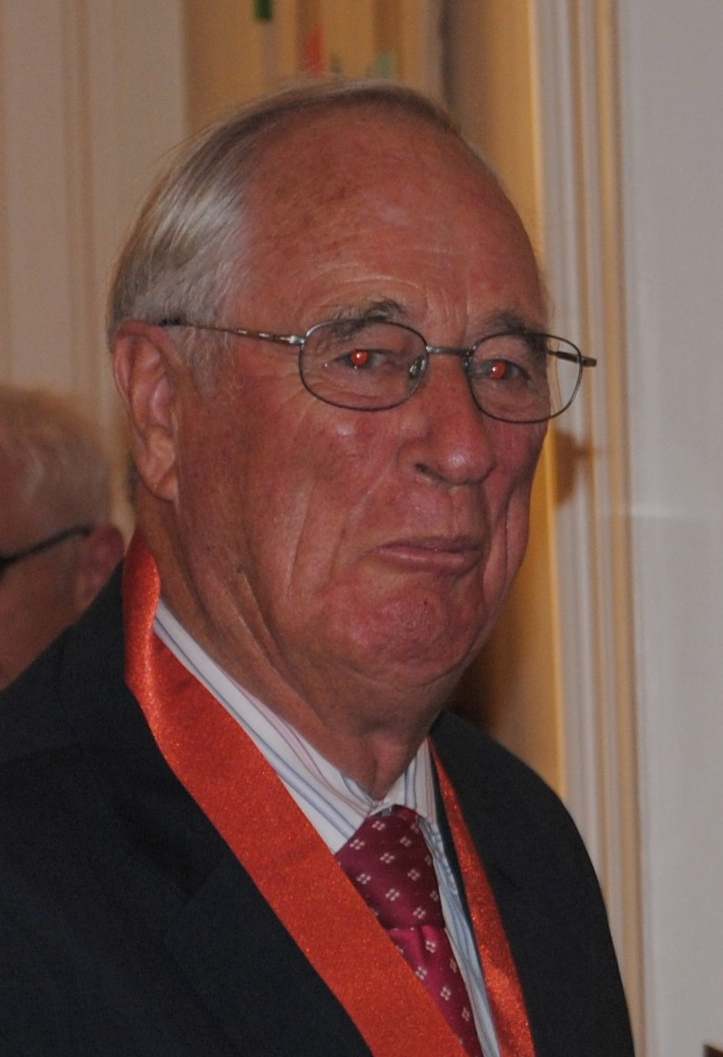
Ian Templeton

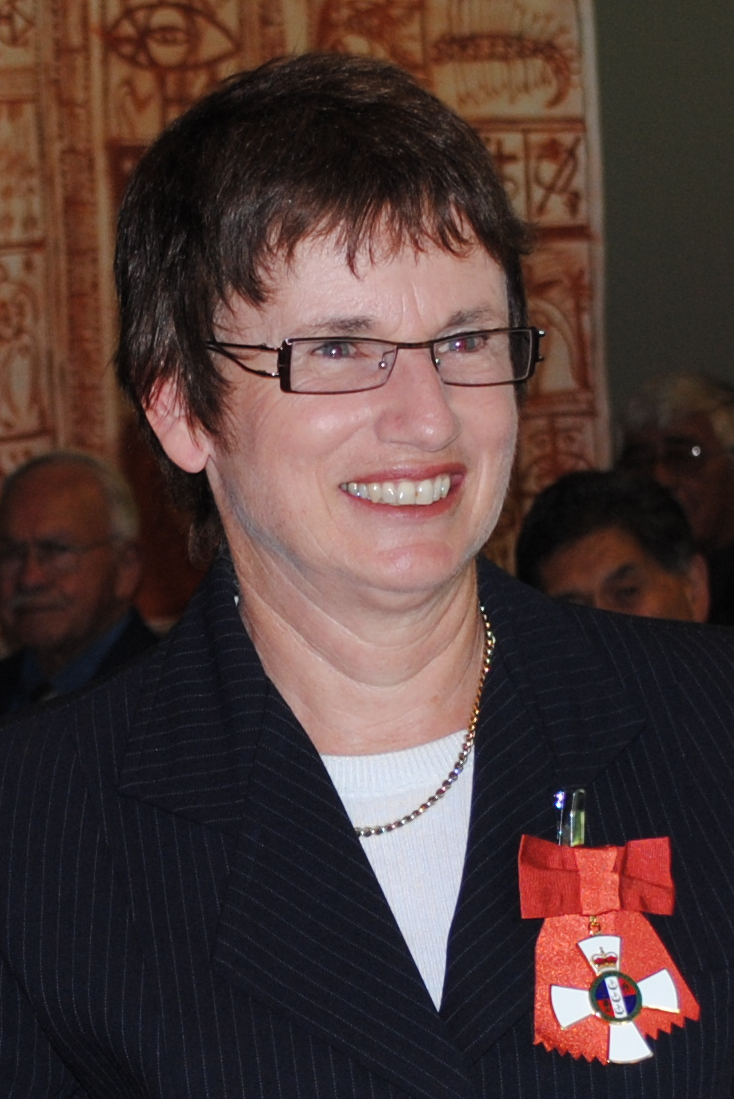
Helen Timperley

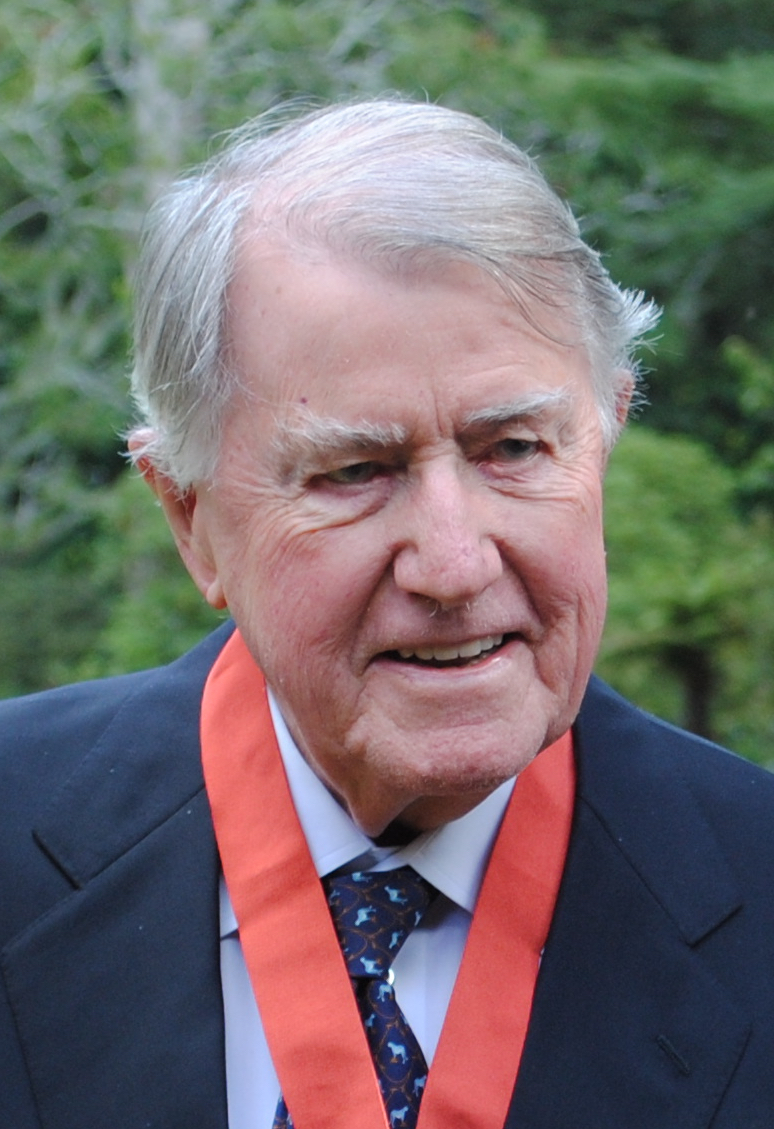
Neville Wran

=== Officer (ONZM) ===
- Patricia Alston – of London, United Kingdom. For services to New Zealand–United Kingdom relations.
- Florence Mary Annison QSM – of Kerikeri. For services to the community.
- Judy Ann Bailey – of North Shore City. For services to broadcasting and the community.
- Kevin Michael Barry MBE – of Christchurch. For services to boxing and the community.
- Dr Robert Albert Boas – of Auckland. For services to medicine, in particular pain management.
- John Herbert Bongard – of Kaitaia. For services to business.
- Elizabeth Mary Brown – of Manakau. For services to business, women and the community.
- Bruce Sutherland Chambers – of Auckland. For services to sport, in particular triathlons.
- Wynton Gill Cox – of Christchurch. For services to business.
- The Reverend Dr Allan Kenneth Davidson – of Auckland. For services to history.
- Lawrence Charles Duckworth QSM – of Blenheim. For services to Māori and the community.
- Flora Edwards – of Wellington. For services to music.
- Dr James Daulby Edwards – of Ōtaki. For services to the veterinary profession and the community.
- Friedrich Eisenhofer – of Waikanae. For services to architecture.
- Anthony Edwin Falkenstein – of Auckland. For services to business.
- Rodney Michael Grout – of Christchurch. For services to transport, in particular the maritime industry.
- Associate Professor Vernon John Harvey – of Auckland. For services to medicine, in particular oncology research.
- Professor James Geoffrey Horne – of Wellington. For services to medicine.
- Jack Lawson Inglis QSM – of Motueka. For services to the community.
- Dr Gordon Murray Kirk – of Palmerston North. For services to medicine.
- Elizabeth Ann Mallinson QSM – of Wellington. For services to publishing, in particular children's literature.
- William Lindsay Matson – of Waikanae. For services to swimming.
- Colin Harry Russell MBE – of Christchurch. For services to education.
- Dr Hugh Timothy Spencer – of Hamilton. For services to medicine, in particular anaesthesia.
- John David Sutherland – of Auckland. For services to architecture.
- Edgar John Young JP – of New Plymouth. For services to the dairy industry and the community.

Honorary

- John E. Mullen – of Alexandria, Virginia, United States of America. For services to New Zealand–United States relations.
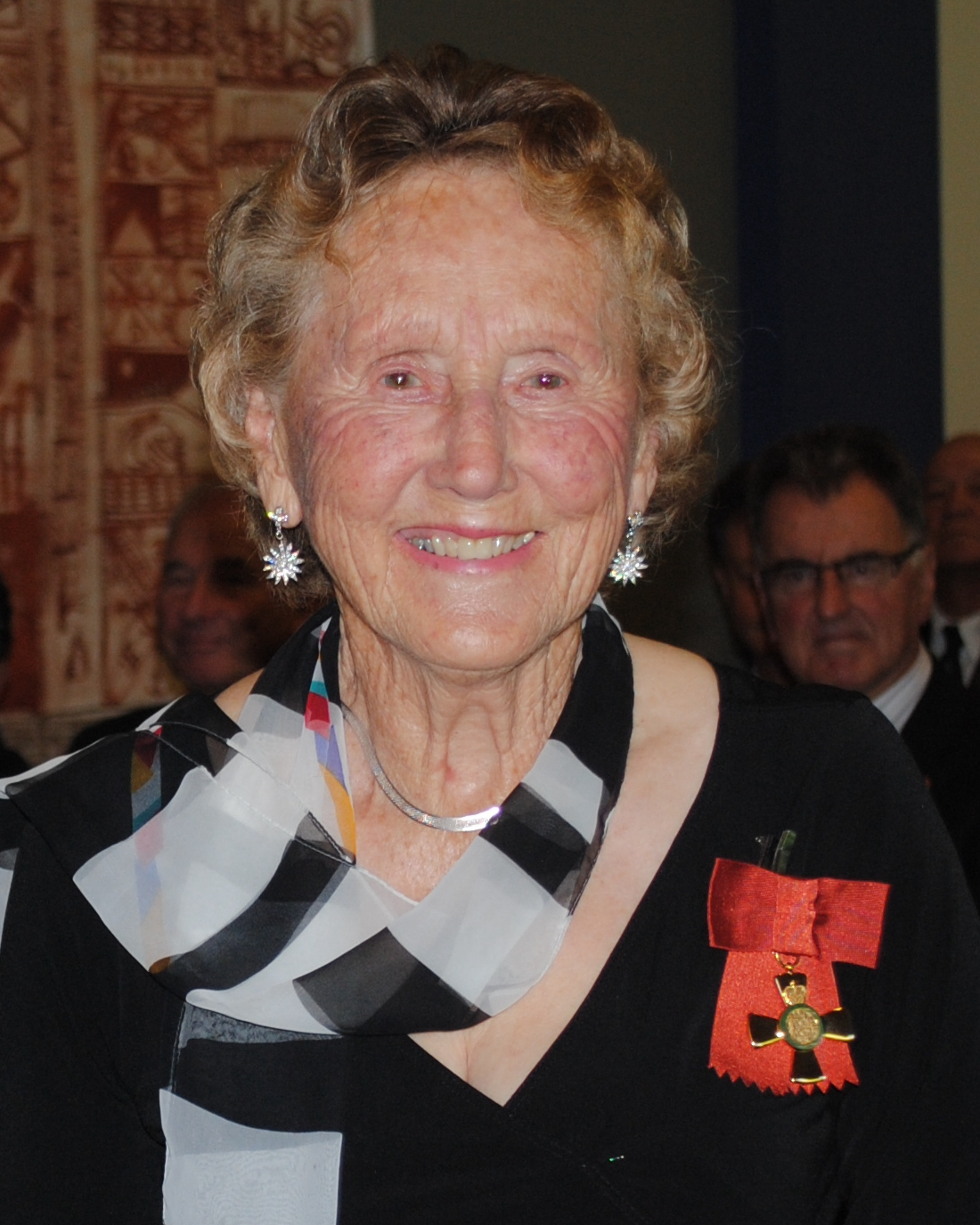
Florence Annison

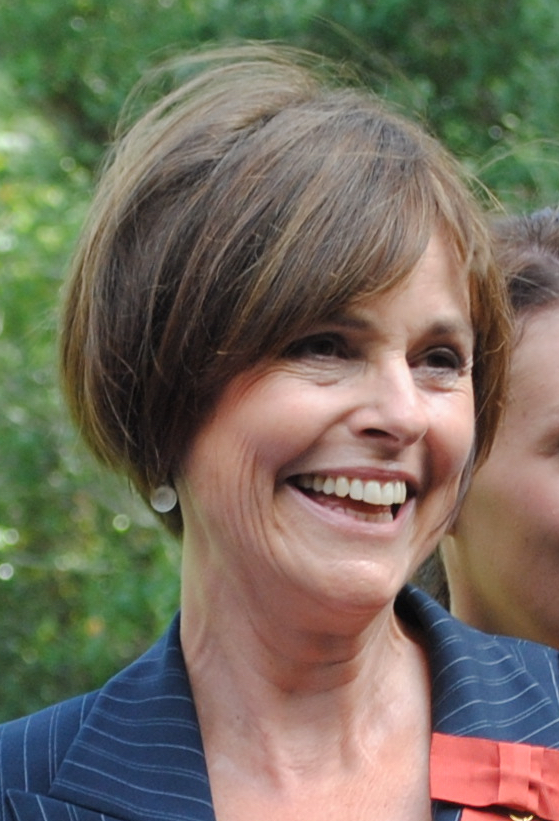
Judy Bailey

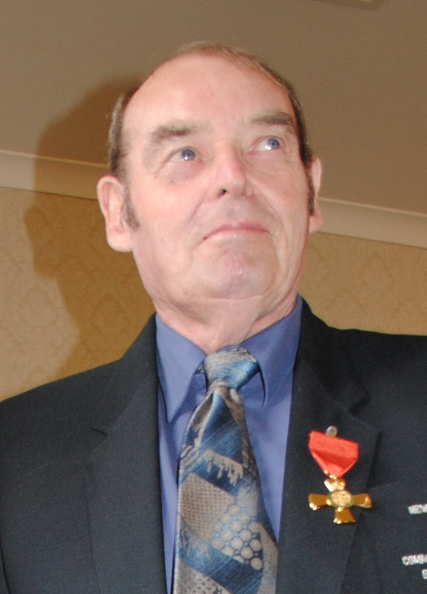
Kevin Barry

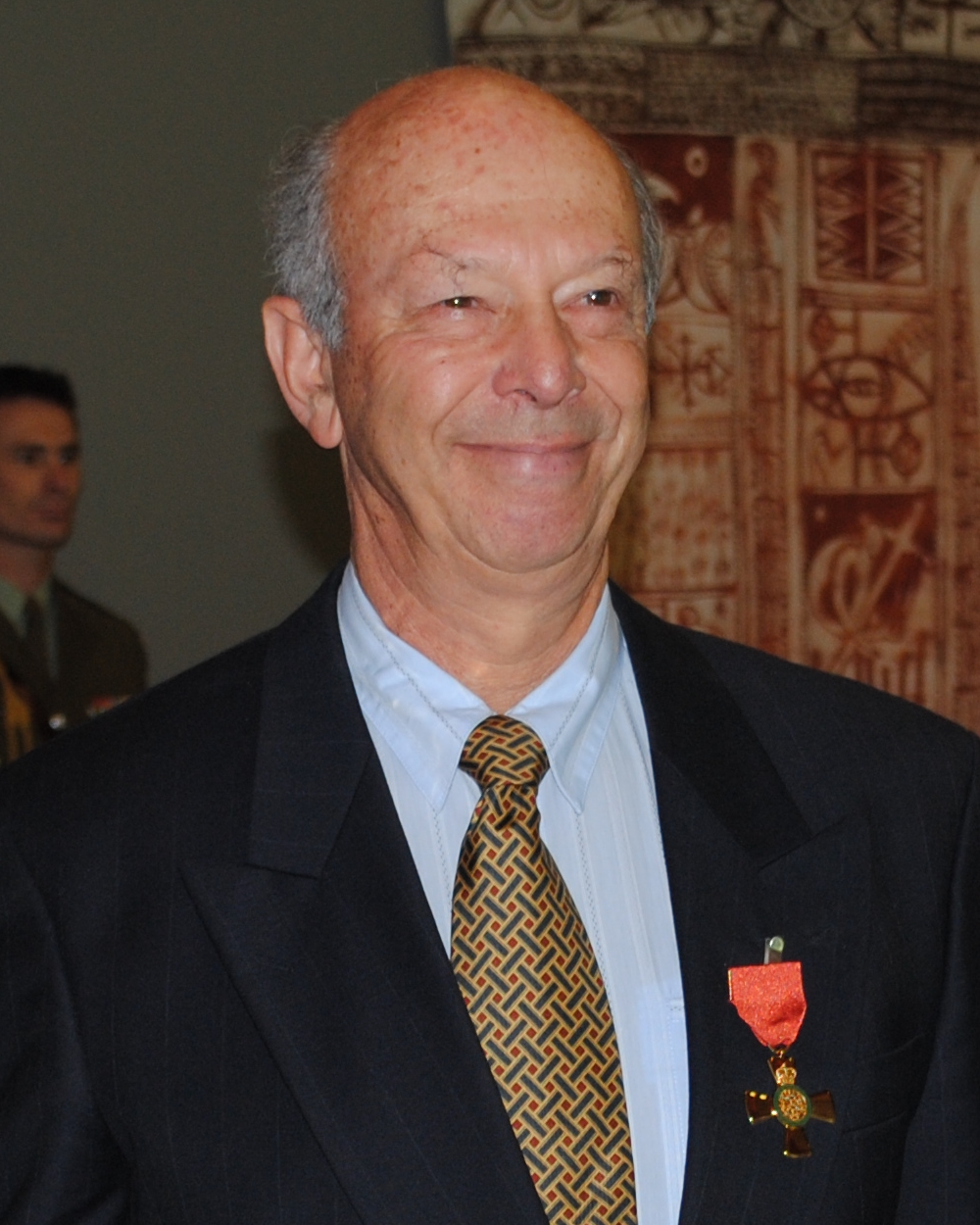
Bob Boas

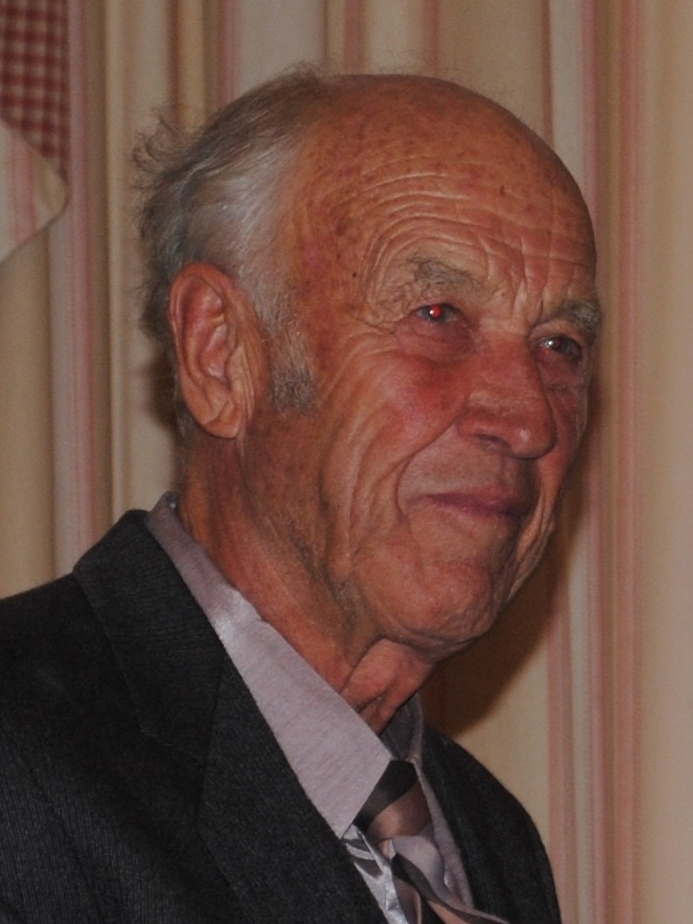
Fritz Eisenhofer

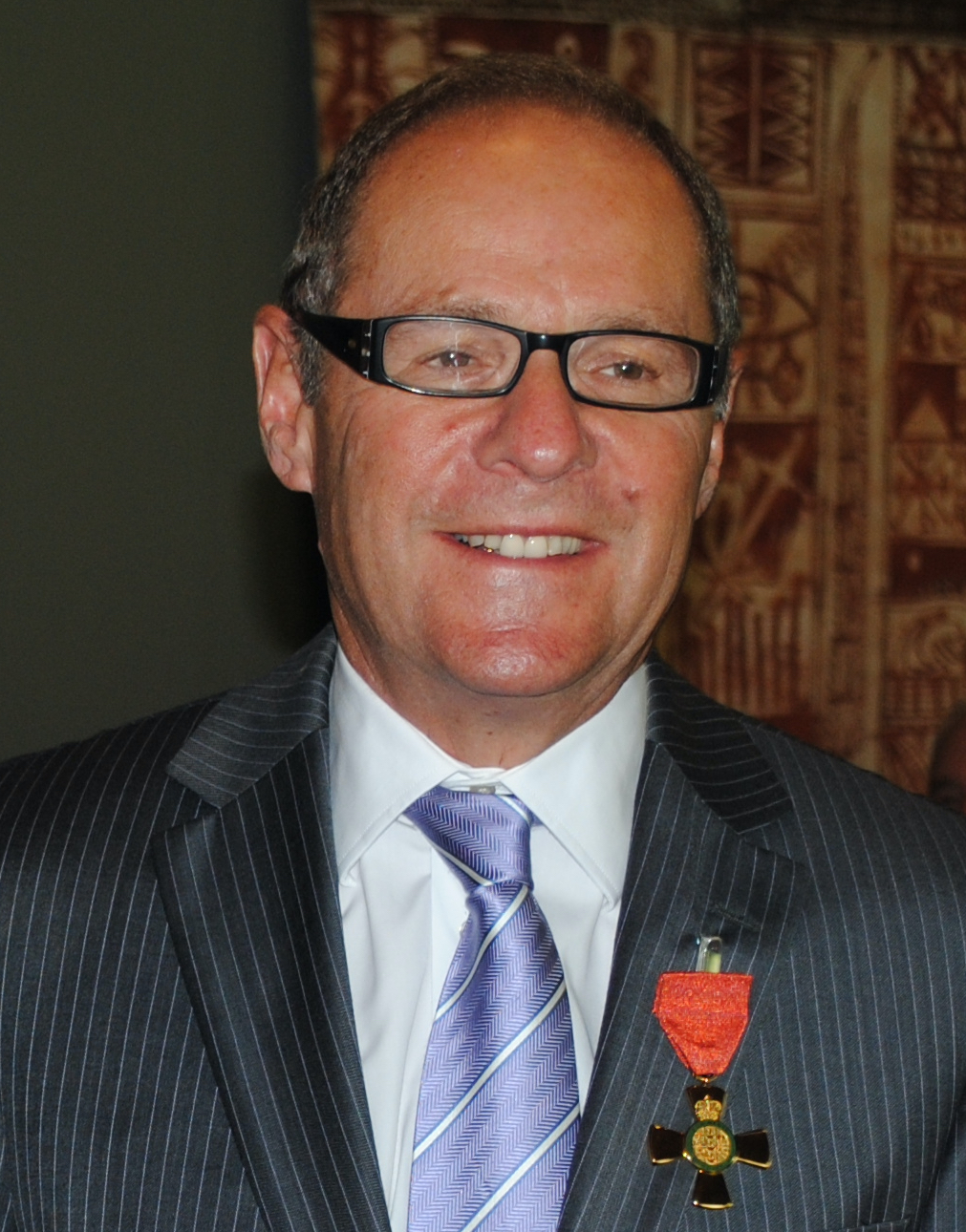
Tony Falkenstein

Jack Inglis

Murray Kirk

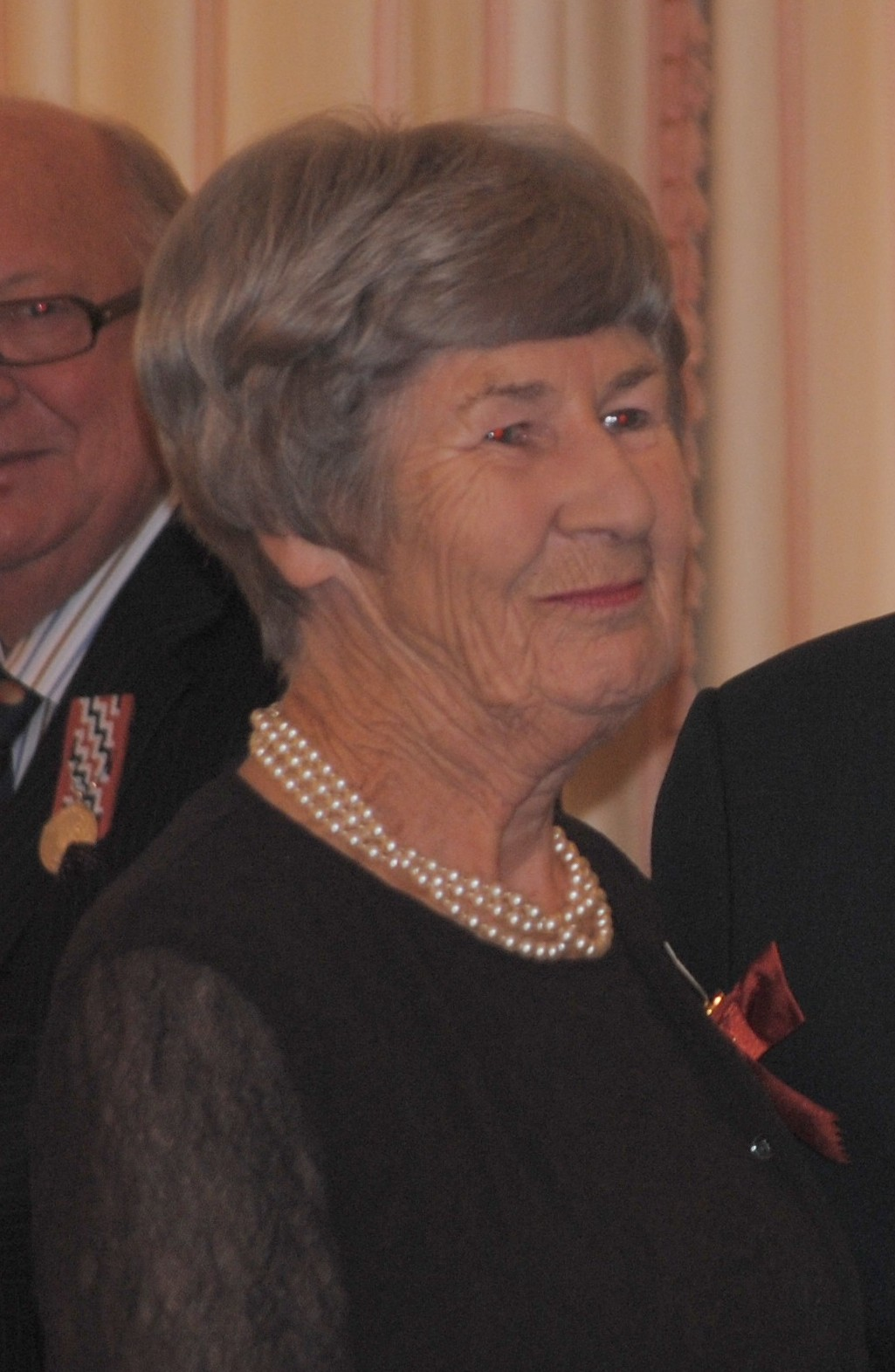
Ann Mallinson

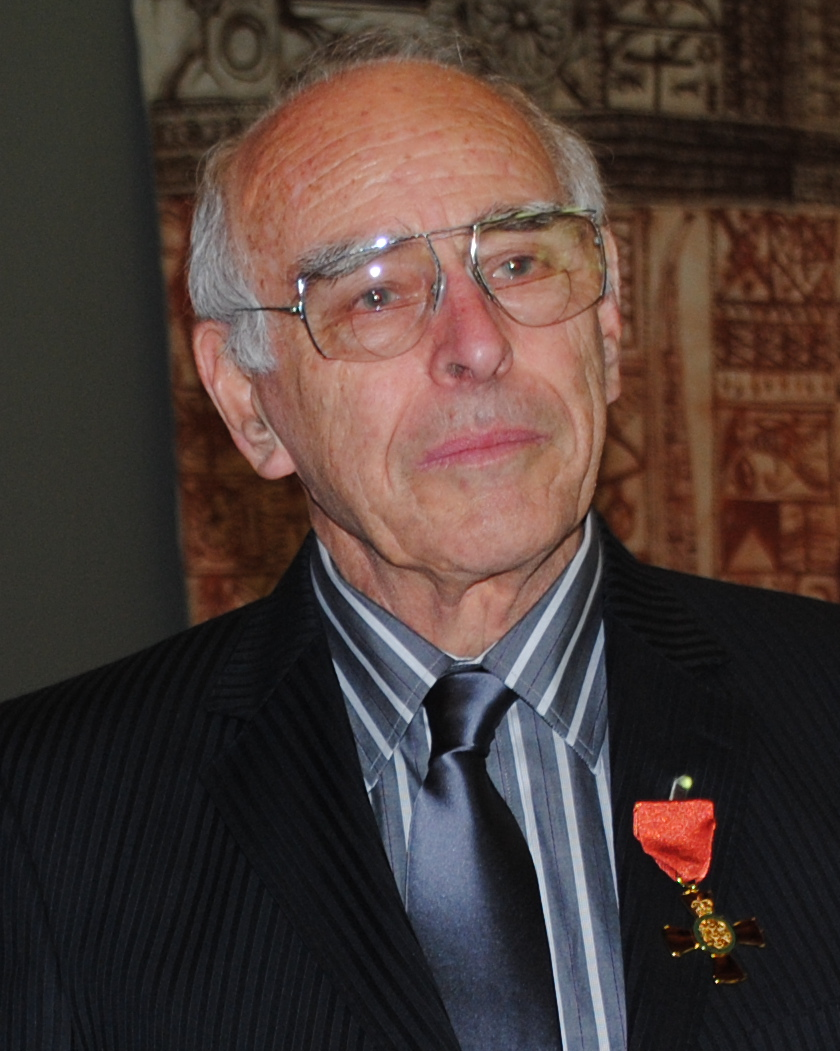
John Sutherland

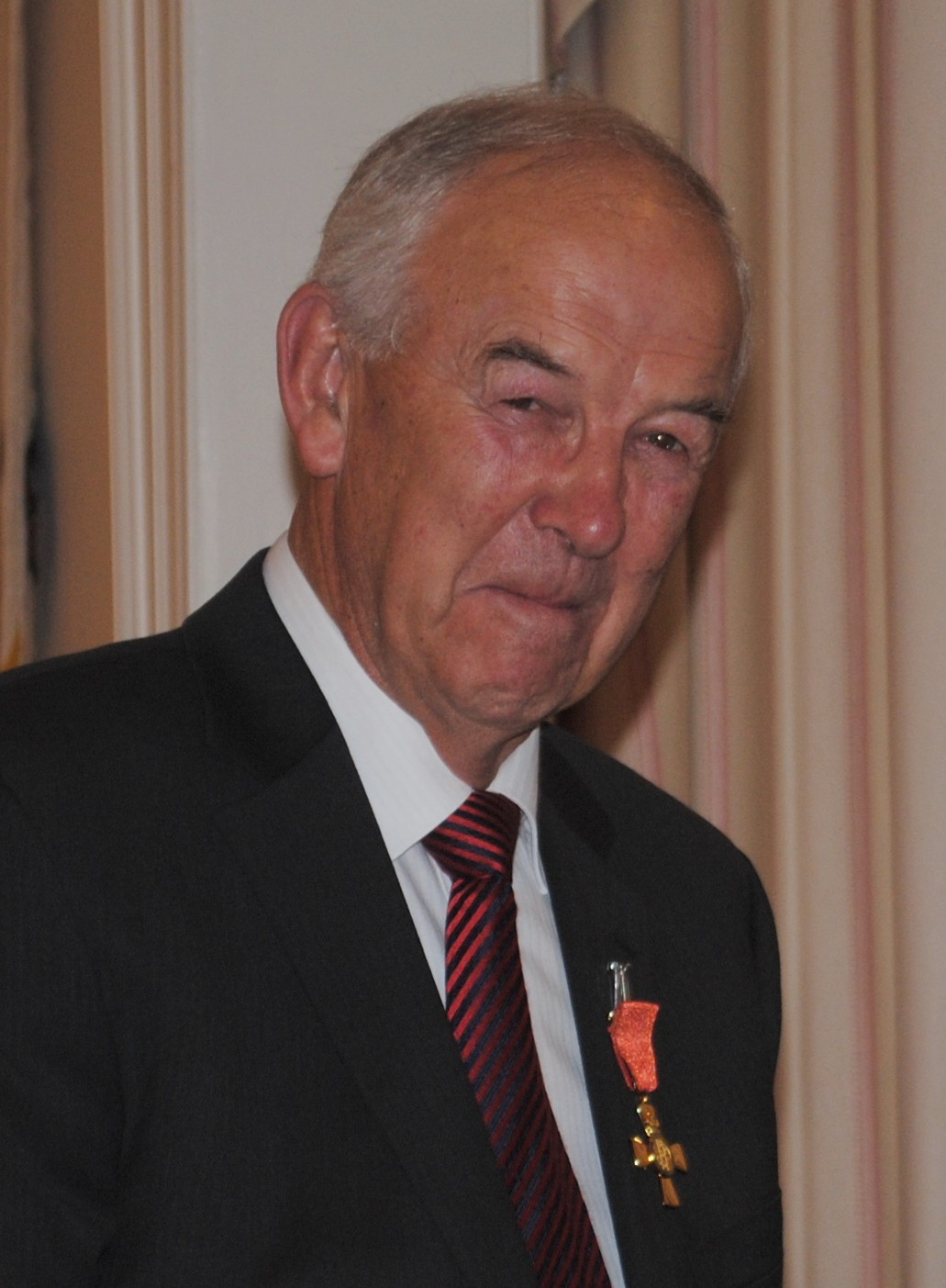
John Young

=== Member (MNZM) ===
- Dr Jacqueline Sherburd Te Makahi Allan – of Auckland. For services to Māori health.
- Craig George Baird – of Sanctuary Cove, Queensland, Australia. For services to motorsport.
- Gillian Mary Bannan – of Auckland. For services to golf.
- Warrant Officer Class One John Carruthers Barclay – Royal New Zealand Armoured Corps, New Zealand Defence Force, of Lower Hutt. For services to the New Zealand Defence Force.
- John Geoffrey Beaumont – of Havelock North. For services to sport, in particular swimming.
- Donald Mairangi Bennett – of Rotorua. For services to Māori and the community.
- Dr Roderick Leon Bieleski – of North Shore City. For services to horticultural science.
- John Wesley Bowis – of East London, Republic of South Africa. For services to Save the Children New Zealand.
- Dr Michael Antony Boyes – of Dunedin. For services to outdoor recreation and mountain safety.
- Rosalie Louise Carey – of Whangārei. For services to the theatre.
- David George Cox – of Christchurch. For services to the community.
- Dr Daniel Charles Sundersingh Devadhar – of Wellington. For services to medicine and the community.
- Peter Scott Drummond – of Auckland. For services to the community.
- Margaret Lilian Ellett – of North Shore City. For services to women.
- Maurice John Facoory JP – of Auckland. For services to sport, in particular speedway.
- George Ian Fairbairn JP – of Wellington. For services to the community.
- Dr Ian Brookman Ferguson – of Waitakere (West Auckland). For services to horticultural science.
- Professor Sitaleki 'Ata'ata Finau – of Auckland. For services to Pacific Islands community health.
- Gillian Heald – of Christchurch. For services to education.
- Emeritus Professor Colin William Holmes – of Palmerston North. For services to agriculture.
- Timothy Charles Robert Horner – of Ōtaki. For services to the New Zealand Customs Service.
- Warwick Ean Hunt – of Dubai, United Arab Emirates. For services to accounting.
- Professor Peter John Hunter – of Auckland. For services to science.
- Jacques Christian Jean-Louis – of Auckland. For services to business.
- Mary Elizabeth Theresa Johnson – of Auckland. For services to the deaf community.
- Ian Donald Jones – of North Shore City. For services to rugby.
- Jimmie Kay Yin Kan – of Palmerston North. For services to the Chinese community.
- Alan Bryan Kerr – of Wellington. For services to the Ministry of Agriculture and Forestry.
- Lynette Ellen Miles – of Christchurch. For services to netball administration.
- Garrick Peter Murfitt JP – of Pahiatua. For services to local-body affairs, agriculture and the community.
- Dr John Panton Musgrove – of Christchurch. For services to community medicine.
- Dr Wallace Bruce Niederer – of Taupō. For services to equine veterinary science.
- Dr Peter John O'Hara – of Upper Hutt. For services to animal health and welfare.
- Bruce Leslie Orr – of Tauranga. For services to agriculture.
- Michael Kelvin Pannett – detective superintendent, New Zealand Police, of Wellington. For services to the New Zealand Police.
- Joanna Mary Gordon Perry – of Auckland. For services to accounting.
- Ruth Jane Pretty – of Te Horo. For services to the food industry.
- Dennis George Rich JP – of Christchurch. For services to the community.
- Dr David William Sabiston – of Napier. For services to ophthalmology and the community.
- Rex Samuel Sellers – of Manukau (South Auckland). For services to yachting.
- Barry Edward Shea – of Ōtaki. For services to the Ministry of Social Development.
- Professor Ngāhuia Te Awekōtuku – of Hamilton. For services to Māori culture.
- Jessie Lorna Thompson – of Christchurch. For services to the community.
- John Percival Tregidga JP – of Paeroa. For services to local-body affairs and the community.
- David Reginald Kinnaird Truscott – of Manukau. For services to business.
- George Curry Vickers JP – of Te Kauwhata. For services to the community.
- Dr Christine Mary Miriam Walsh – of Levin. For services to women's health.
- Paora Whaanga – of Gisborne. For services to Māori and the community.
- William Glen Turner Wiggs – of Wellington. For services to advertising.
- Bruce Te Kaeaea Werahiko Wikitoa – of Timaru. For services to Māori.

Additional

- Colonel Richard Lewis Hall (Retired) OBE – of Auckland. For services to the New Zealand Defence Force.

Honorary

- Christine Margaret Pearce – of Wellington. For services to music.
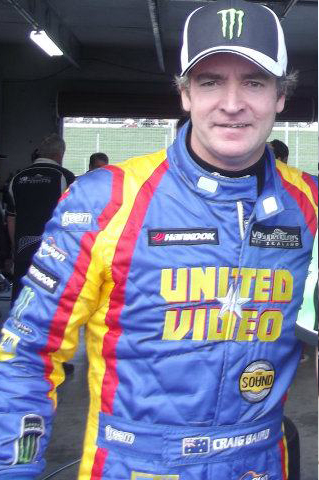
Craig Baird

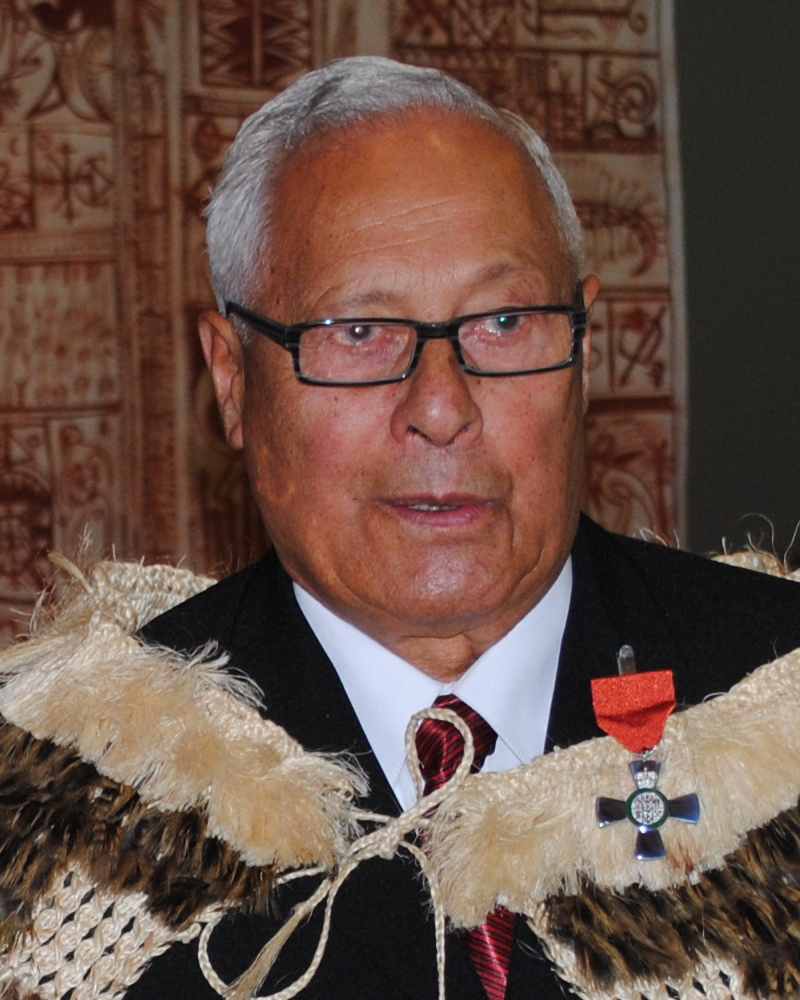
Don Bennett

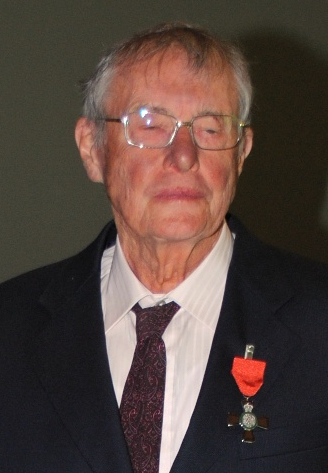
Rod Bieleski

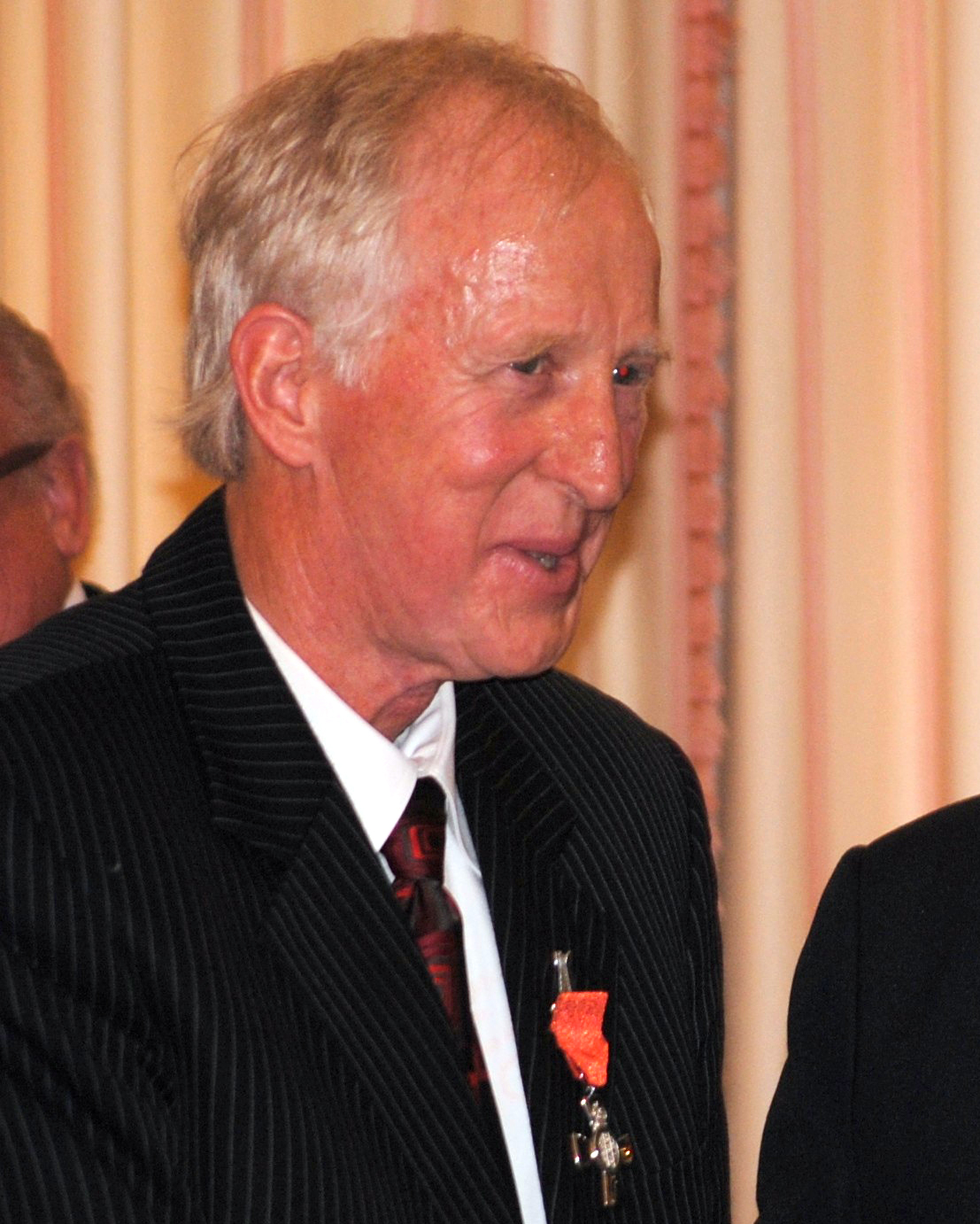
Mike Boyes

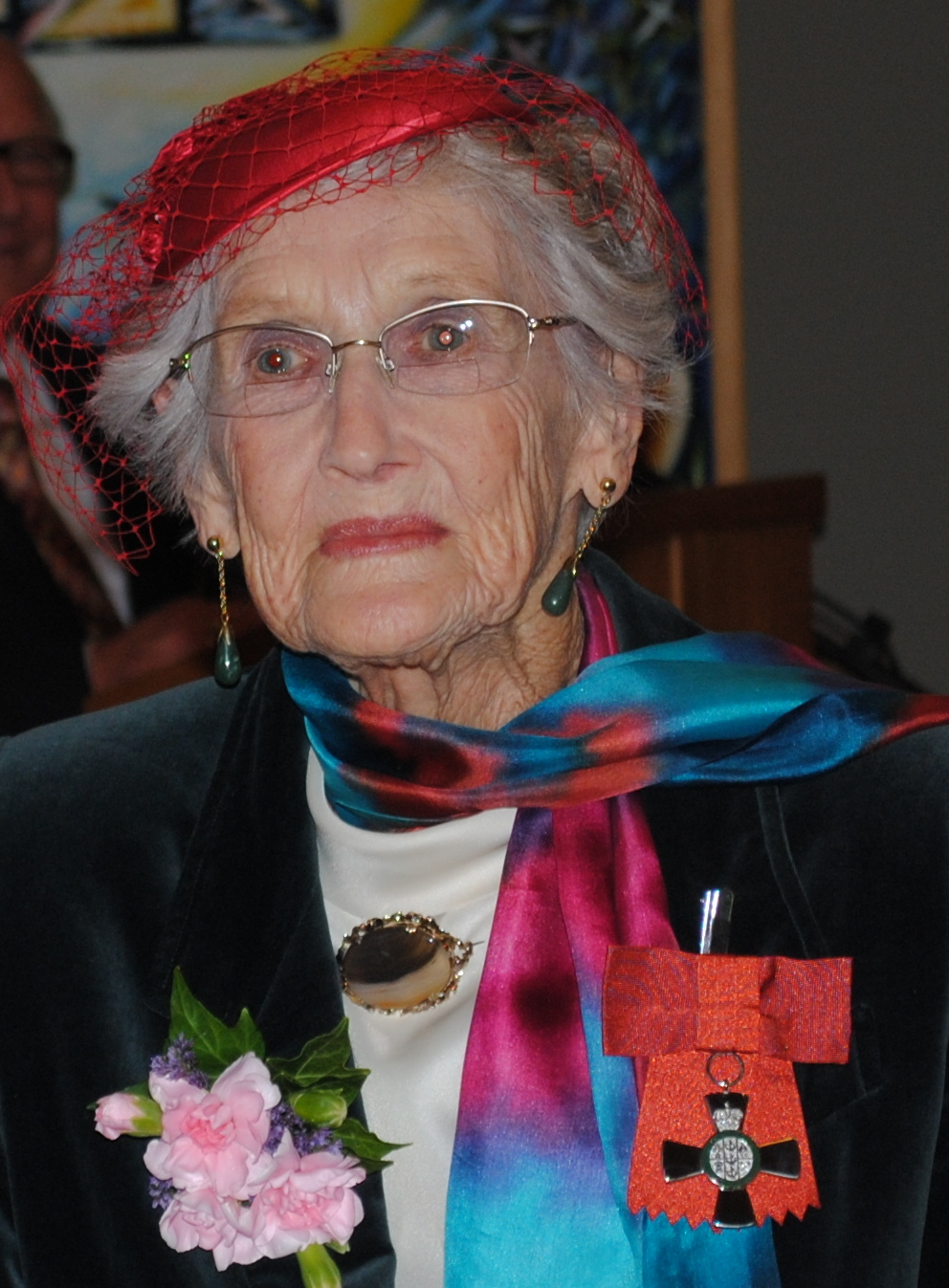
Rosalie Carey

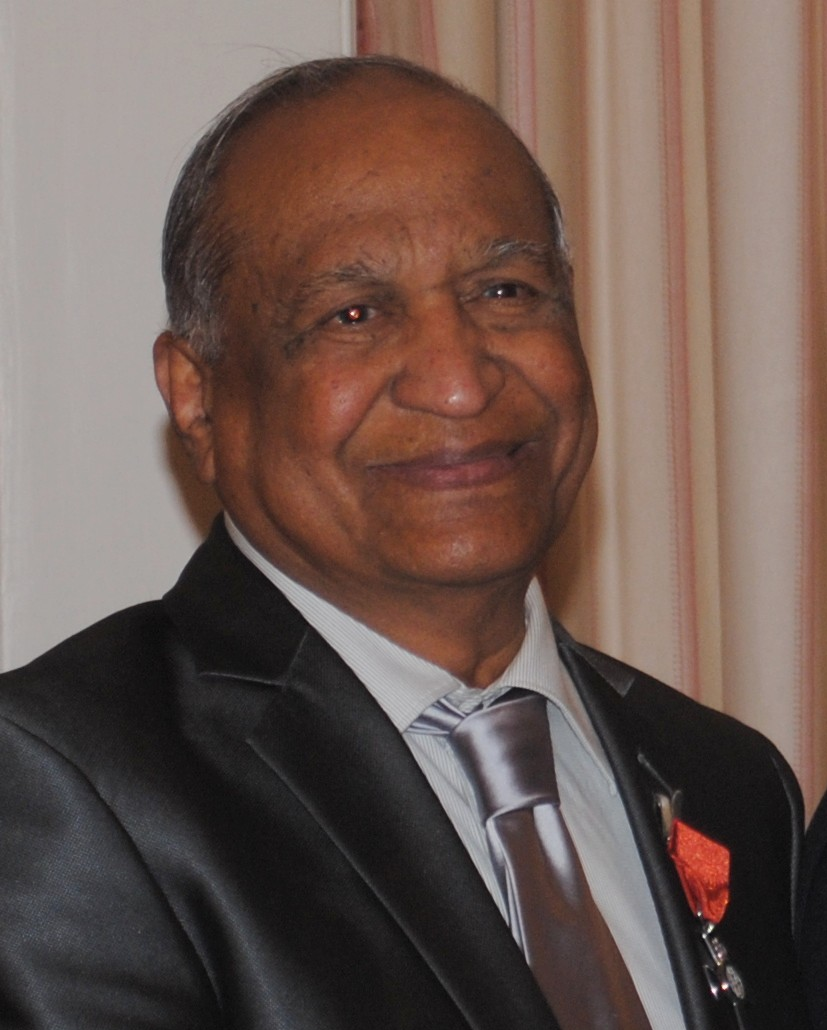
Dan Devadhar

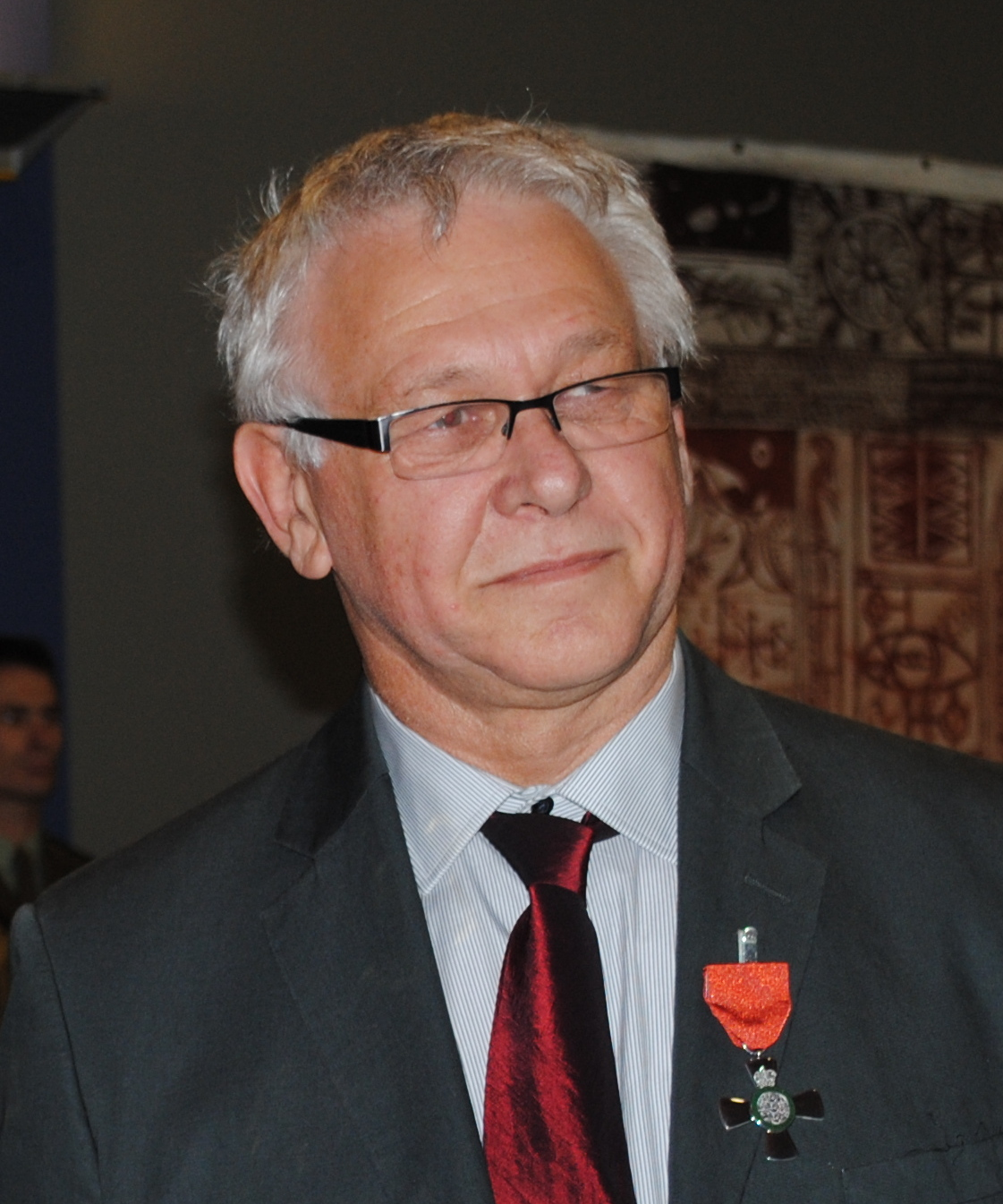
Ian Ferguson

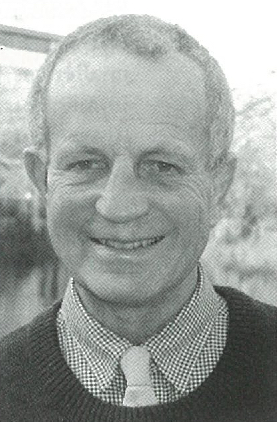
Colin Holmes

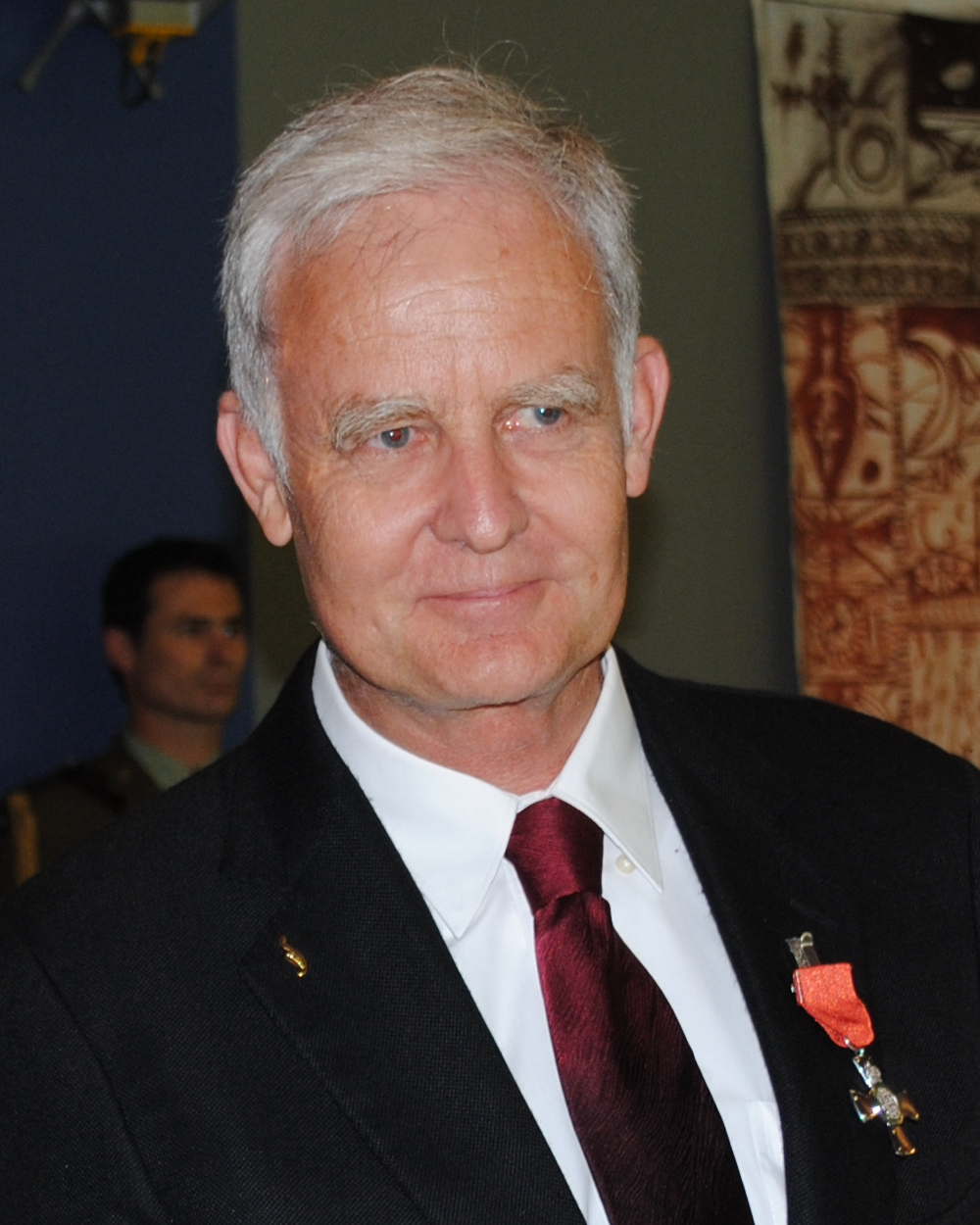
Peter Hunter

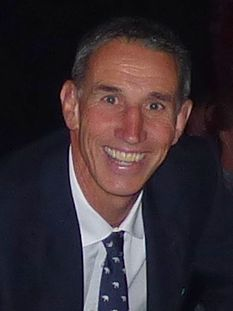
Ian Jones

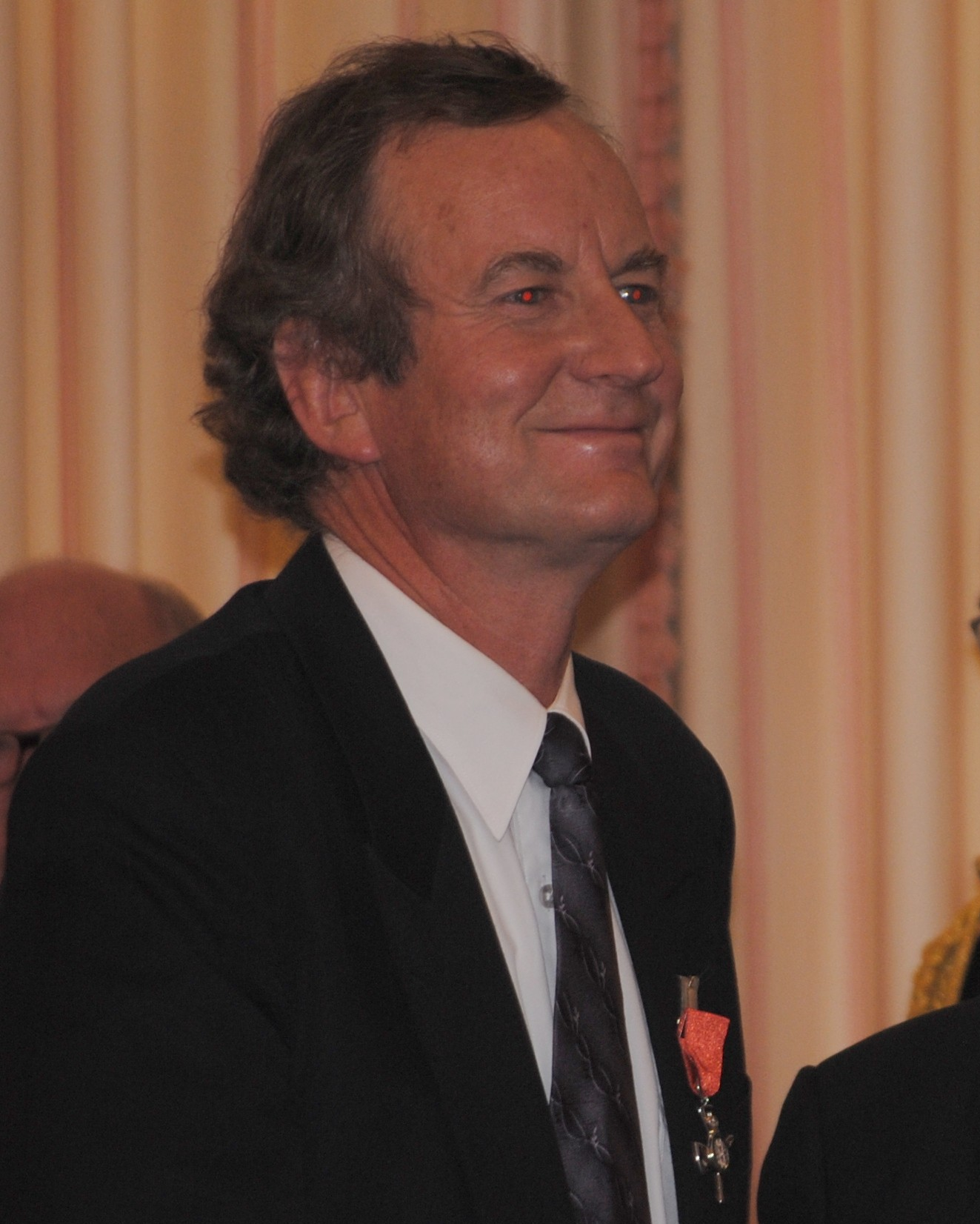
Alan Kerr

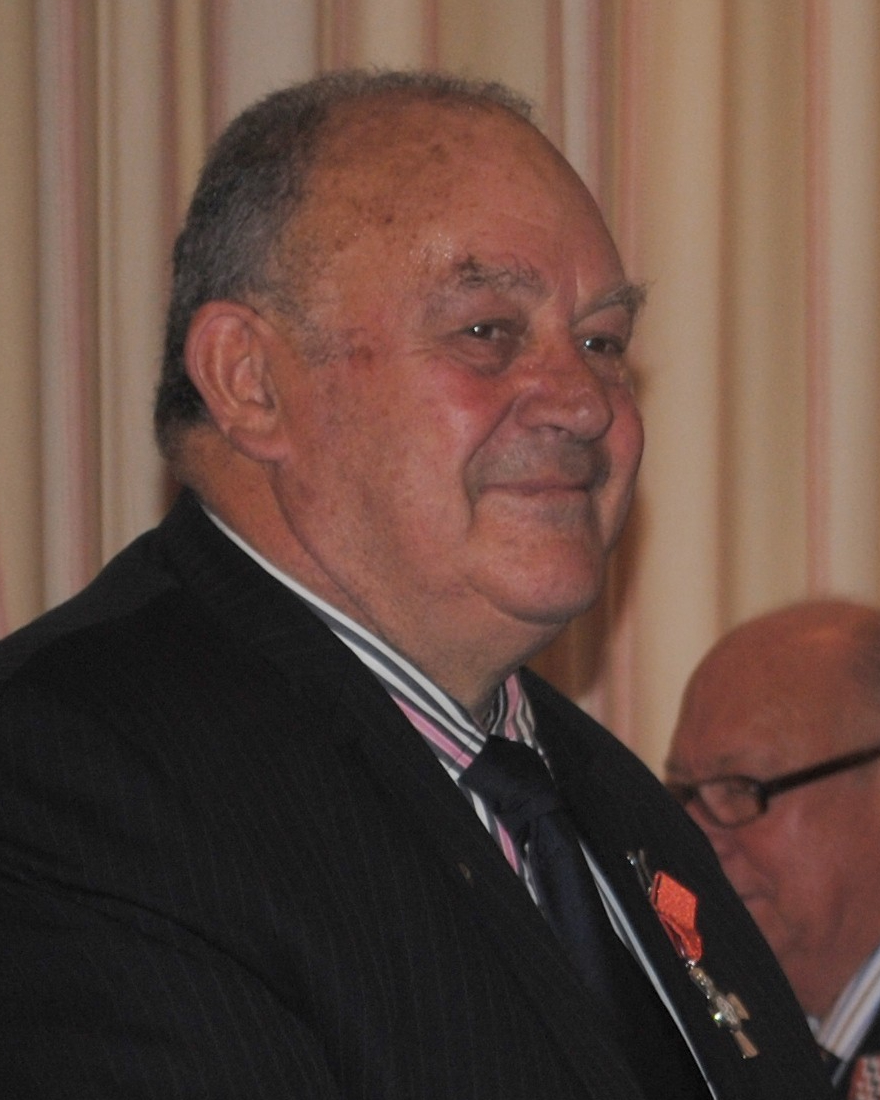
Garrick Murfitt

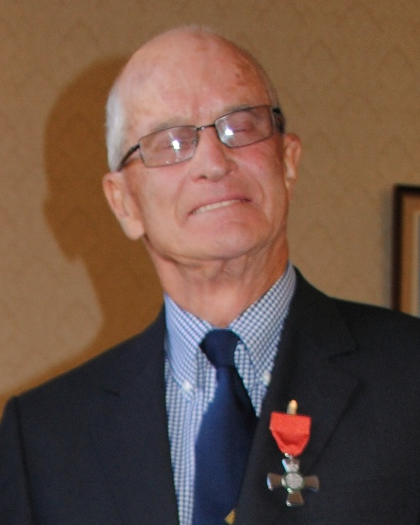
John Musgrove

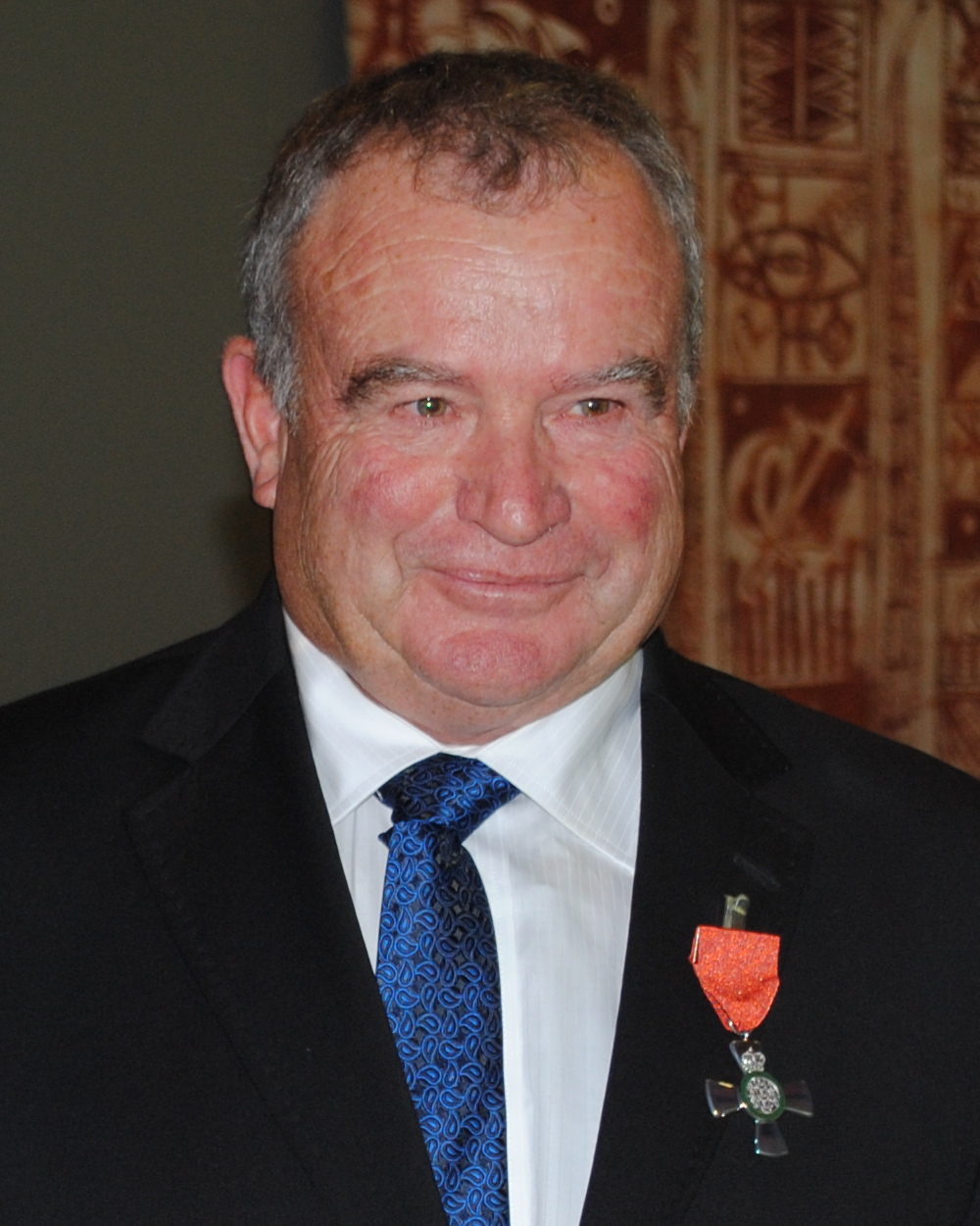
Wallie Niederer

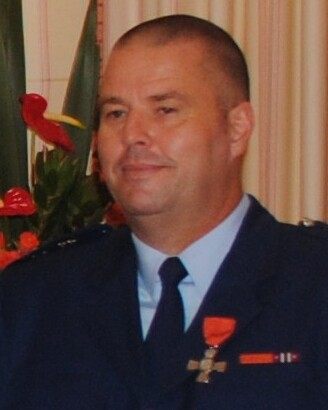
Mike Pannett

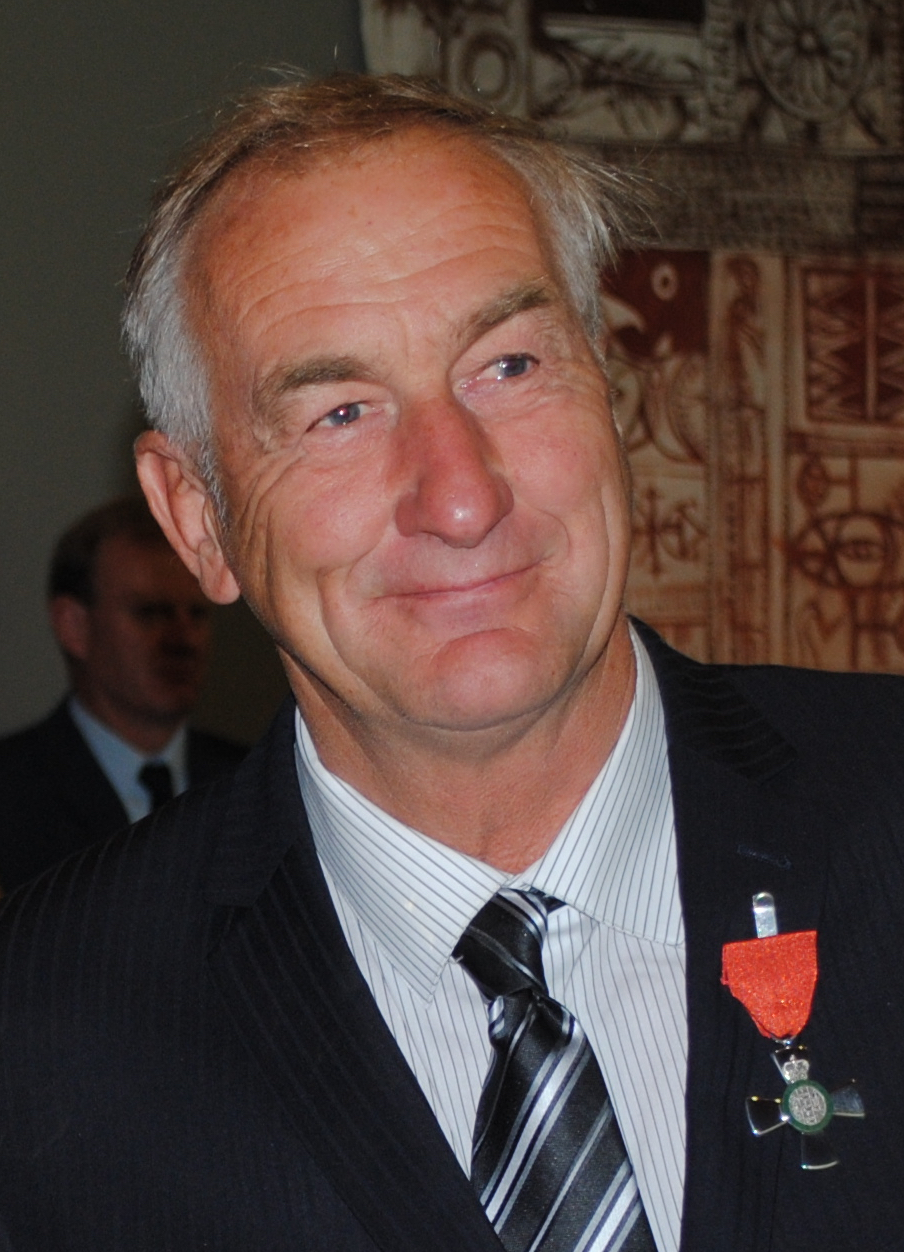
Rex Sellers

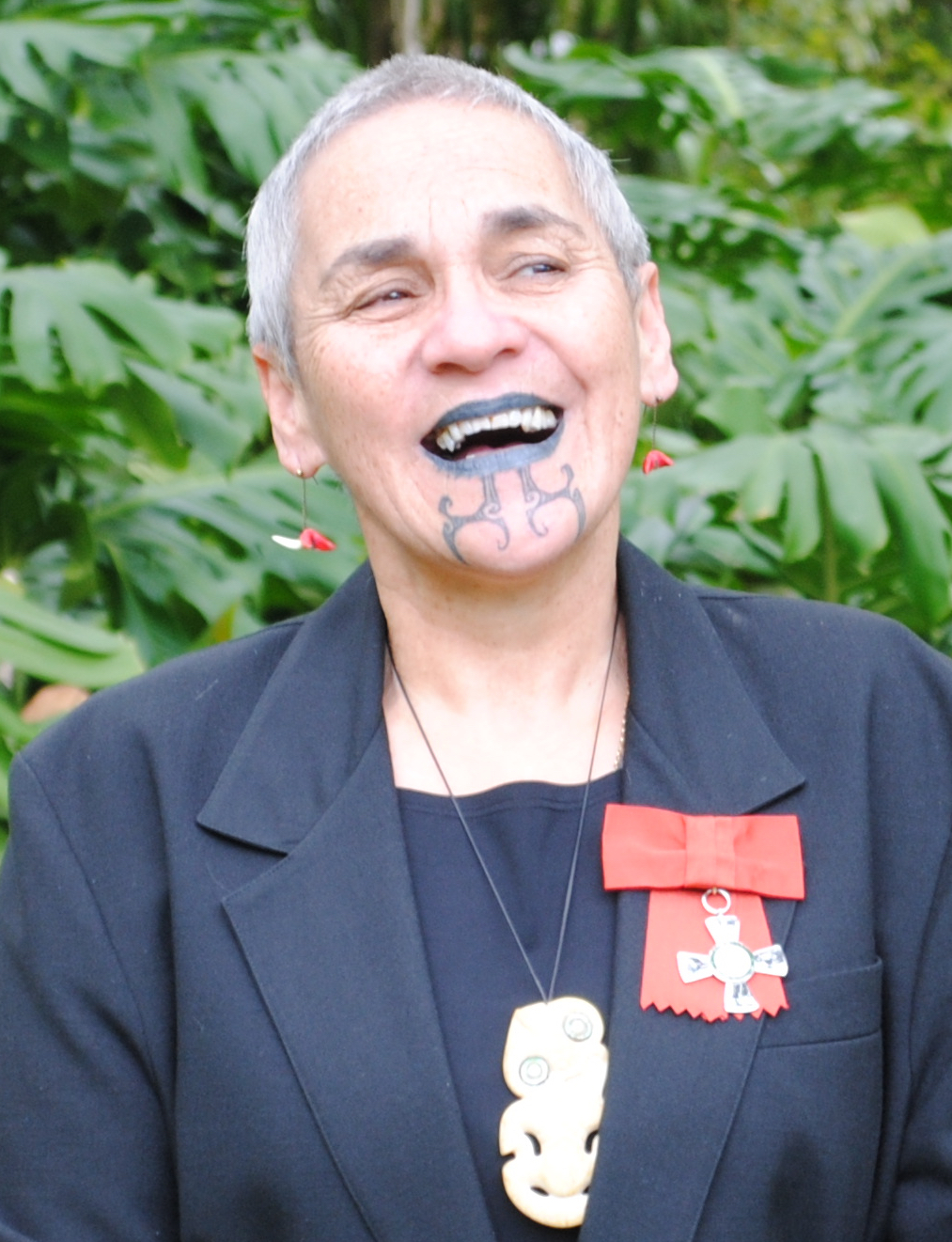
Ngāhuia Te Awekōtuku

== Companion of the Queen's Service Order (QSO) ==
- Stella Bares JP – of Wellington. For services to the Greek community.
- Jill Ethel Eggleton – of Auckland. For services to education and literacy.
- Murray Grant Ferris JP – of Gisborne. For services to the community.
- Marion Margaret Guy – of Tauranga. For services to nursing.
- Lorraine Pya Isaacs – of Dunedin. For services to television, education and women.
- Nicholas John Ledgard – of Rangiora. For services to forestry.
- Alexander Robert McLean – of Wellington. For public services.
- Lawrence James Metcalf – of Richmond. For services to horticulture.
- Elaine Joy Moffat JP – of Lower Hutt. For services to women and the community.
- Thelma Lane Mohi – of Wellington. For services to education.
- Paul Te Poa Karoro Morgan – of Nelson. For services to Māori business and Māori.
- Alan Chetter Warner – of Auckland. For services to water safety.
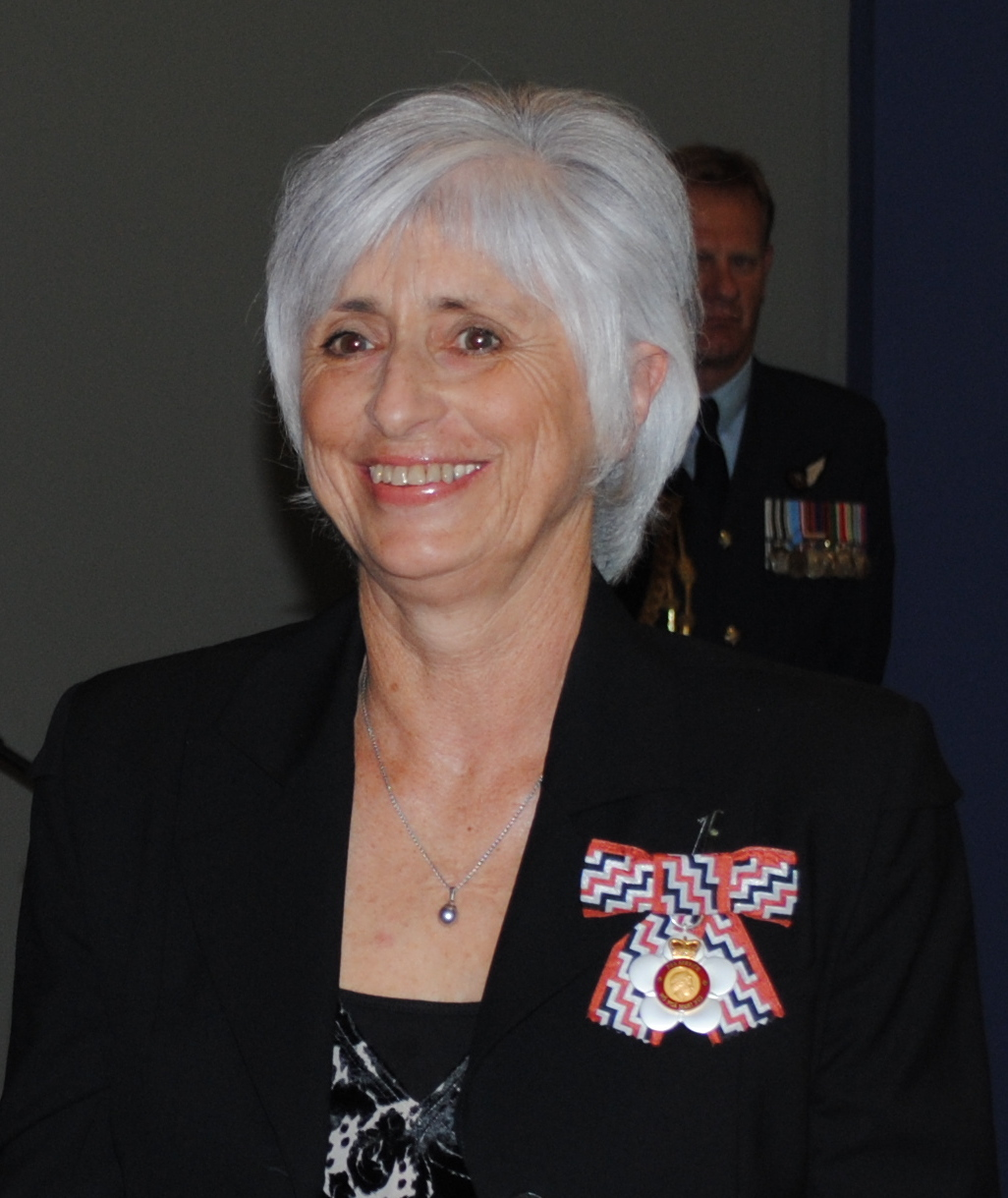
Jill Eggleton

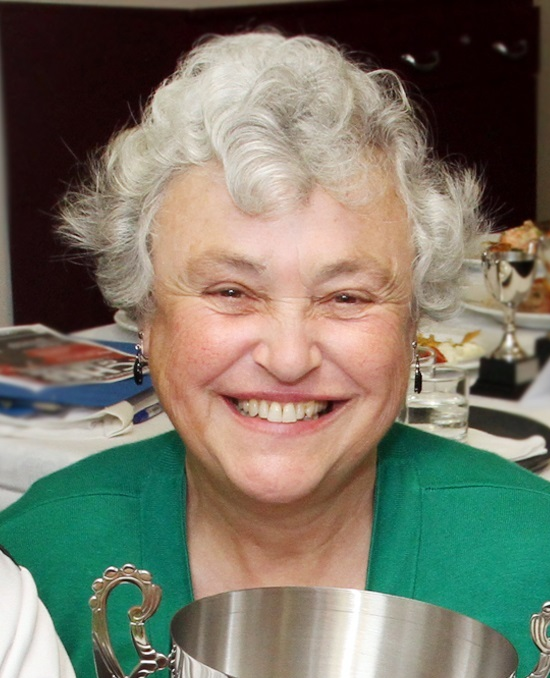
Lorraine Isaacs

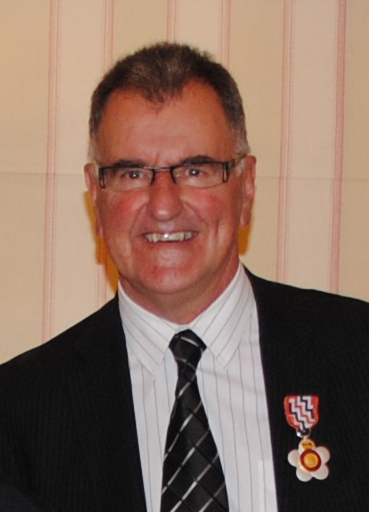
Alec McLean

Elaine Moffat

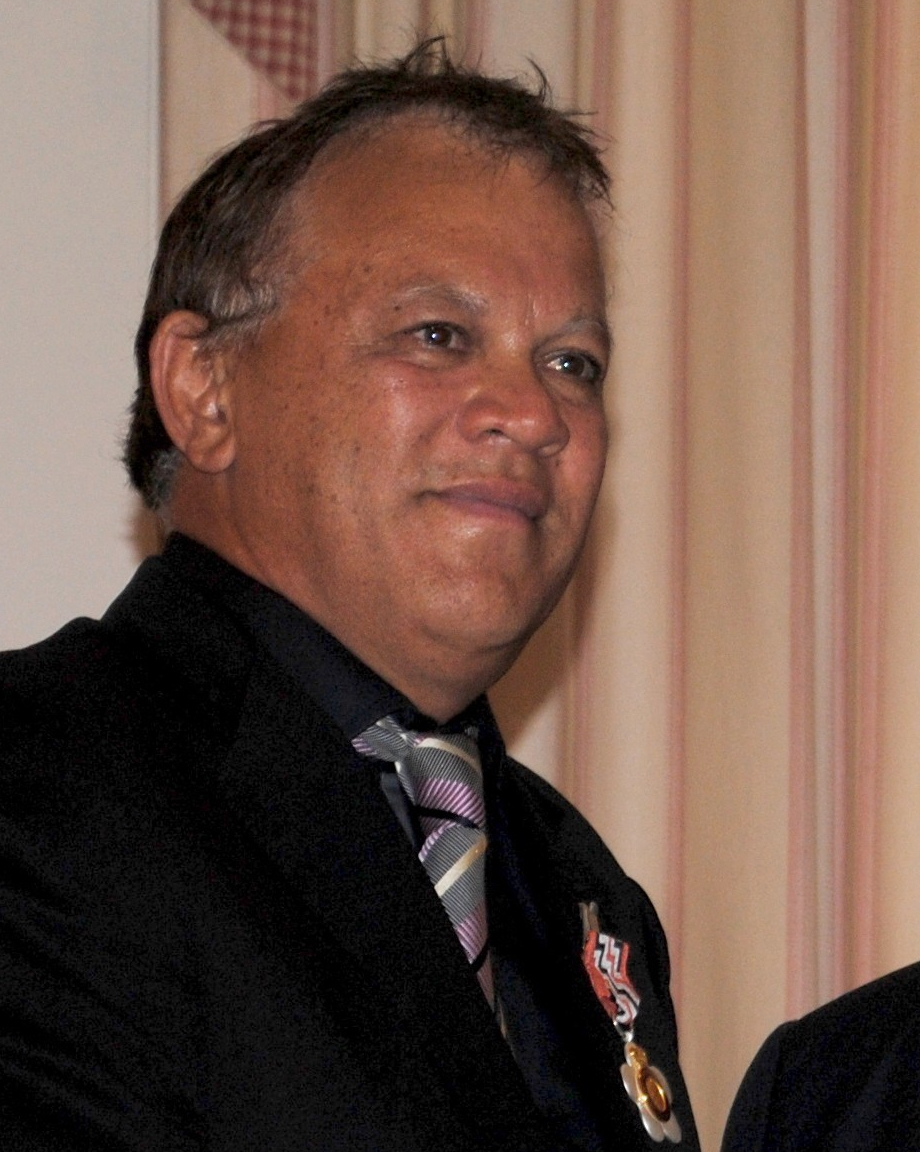
Paul Morgan

== Queen's Service Medal (QSM) ==
- Toleafoa Kirisimasi Aiolupotea JP – of Manukau. For services to the Pacific Islands community.
- Neale Scott Ames – of Ōtaki. For services to surf life saving.
- Ann Jane Hanley Bain – of Auckland. For services to children.
- Bryan Digby Benton JP – of New Plymouth. For services to the community.
- Martin Joseph Berryman – of Hamilton. For services to the New Zealand Fire Service.
- Daulat Singh Bindra – of Hamilton. For services to the Indian community.
- Roy David Breeze – of Hamilton. For services to the New Zealand Fire Service.
- Robert James Brown – of Nelson. For services to the community.
- James Hikurangi Cherrington JP – of Kaikohe. For services to Māori and the community.
- Geoffrey Alan Clements – of Christchurch. For services to the television industry.
- John Spencer Coles – of Cambridge. For services to the community.
- Murray Roderic Compton – of Christchurch. For services to business and the community.
- Rodney William Cornelius – of North Shore City. For services to local heritage.
- Grant Peter Coward – Detective Senior Sergeant, New Zealand Police, of New Plymouth. For services to the New Zealand Police.
- Gillian Ann Davies – of Napier. For services to the theatre.
- Allan James Devlin JP – of Lower Hutt. For services to the community.
- Edwin Bryan Hamilton Dick ED – of Christchurch. For services to the community.
- David George Drayton – of Christchurch. For services to the community.
- Robert Leonard Filbee – Senior Constable, New Zealand Police, of Palmerston North. For services to the New Zealand Police.
- James Alexander Fraser – of Christchurch. For services to the community.
- Nancy Grieve Geer – of Hokitika. For services to the community.
- Peter Leslie Hallett – of Hamilton. For services to the New Zealand Fire Service.
- Lester Robert Harvey – of Mosgiel. For services to the community.
- Olive June Haultain – of Hamilton. For services to the community.
- James Edward Higgins – of Christchurch. For services to community health.
- Richard George Hore – of Christchurch. For services to music.
- Helen Elizabeth Huddleston – of Balclutha. For services to the community.
- Sister Anne Catherine Hurley – of Manukau. For services to the community.
- Olivia Jean James – of Waitakere. For services to the community.
- Owen David Kinsella – of Tauranga. For services to the New Zealand Fire Service.
- The Elder Reverend Aotofaga Tupulua Lemuelu II – of Takanini. For services to the Pacific Islands community.
- Stephen Andrew John Logie – of Wallacetown. For services to the Ministry of Fisheries.
- Evelyn Frances Joan MacDonald – of Waitakere. For services to bird rescue and animal welfare.
- Thomas Duncan Mackenzie – of Wellington. For services to the community.
- Rita Joan Marlow – of Dunedin. For services to gymnastics.
- Sister Margaret Anne Martin – of Manukau. For services to the community.
- Ada McCallum – of Whitianga. For services to the community.
- James Richard McDonough – of Upper Hutt. For services to the New Zealand Police.
- Alexander John McLellan – of Palmerston. For services to marine search and rescue.
- Hugh Kingsmill Moore – of Katikati. For services to horticulture.
- Ivy May Mounsey – of Ngāruawāhia. For services to the community.
- Panchanatham Narayanan – of Upper Hutt. For services to the ethnic community.
- The Reverend Monsignor Bede Brian O'Gorman – of Christchurch. For services to the community.
- Douglas Max Page – of Tākaka. For services to brass bands.
- Isitolo Isaac Pakome JP – of Taupō. For services to the Tokelauan community and the community.
- Te Pura o Te Rangi Parata – of Lyttelton. For services to Māori and the community.
- Hilary Jean Price – of Tauranga. For services to the community.
- Beverley Kathleen Raine – of New Plymouth. For services to emergency management and the community.
- Atawhai Grace Rameka – of Kaikohe. For services to the community.
- Elizabeth Marion Richardson – of Wellington. For services to Māori and Pacific Islands education.
- George Te Aati Ririnui – of Waitangi, Chatham Islands. For services to the Ministry of Fisheries and the community.
- Gaylene Sharon Rogers – Senior Sergeant, New Zealand Police, of Auckland. For services to the New Zealand Police.
- Lawrance Sturrock Saunders – of Blenheim. For services to the community.
- Kevin Andrew Schwass – of North Shore City. For services to the hospitality industry and the community.
- Margaret Ann Seabrook – of Wanganui. For services to the visually impaired community.
- Phillip William Simpson – of Tauranga. For services to the community.
- Simon Garrow Spencer-Bower – of Wānaka. For services to aviation.
- Dorothy Alison Stewart – of Tauranga. For services to senior citizens and the community.
- William John Stirling – of Hastings. For services to Māori and the community.
- David Stone – Sergeant, New Zealand Police, of Otaki. For services to the New Zealand Police.
- Raymond George Strong – of Manukau. For services to the community.
- Desmond Everard Subritzky – of Dargaville. For services to conservation and the community.
- Gary John Talbot – of Thames. For services to the New Zealand Fire Service.
- Loine Louisa Tapaotama Lavakula – of Manukau. For services to the Pacific Islands community.
- Jean Grace Thompson-Church – of Palmerston North. For services to the community.
- Monica Tapapa Kuraia Tongia Unuia – of Manukau. For services to the Pacific Islands community.
- Heather May Tuhoro – of Hamilton. For services to foster care.
- James Tuhoro – of Hamilton. For services to foster care.
- Ineleo Nonu Tuia – of Lower Hutt. For services to the Tokelaun community.
- Jacqueline Catherine Vaughan – of Wellington. For services to speech, drama and the community.
- Victor Charles Viggers DFC – of Napier. For services to music and the community.
- Coraleen Patricia White – of Westport. For services to the community.
- The Reverend Nicholas Warner Wilder – of Auckland. For services to the community.
- Lorraine Louisa Wilson – of Tauranga. For services to senior citizens and the community.
- Edward Wong – of Auckland. For services to martial arts.
- John Hin Chi Wong – of Manukau. For services to the ethnic community.
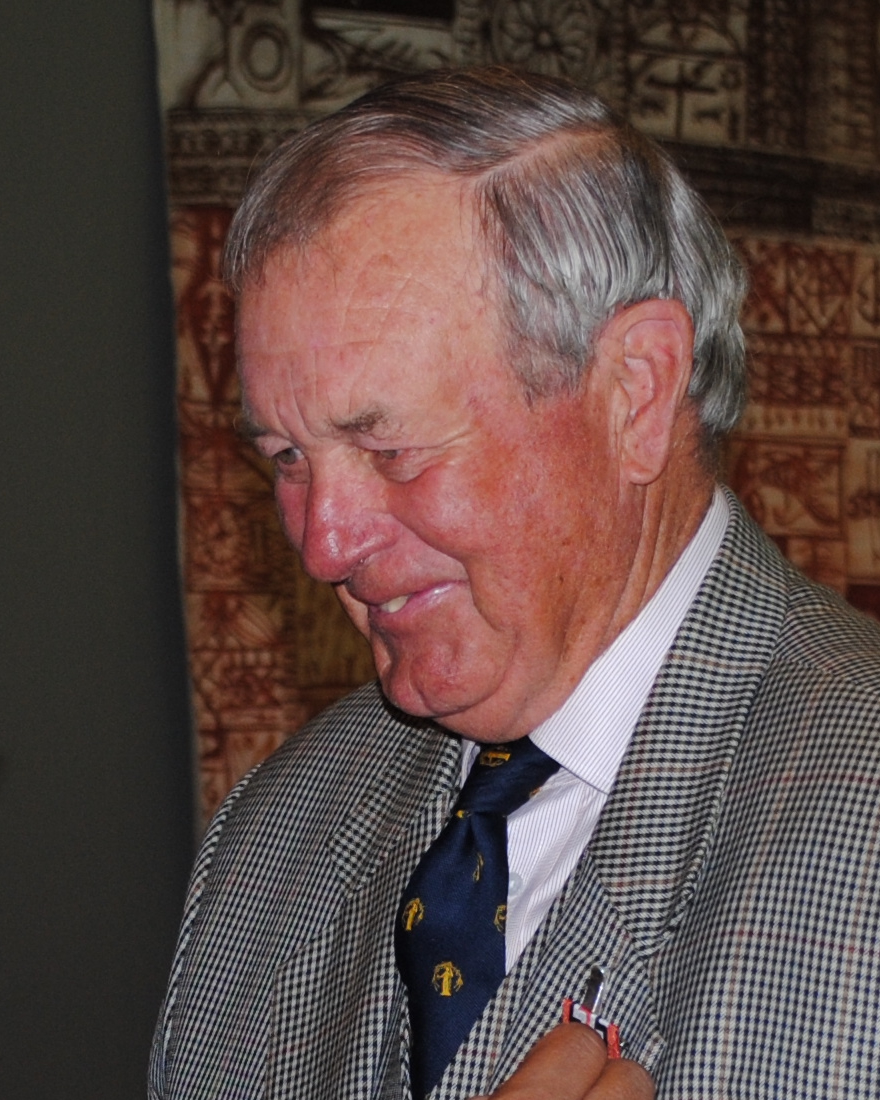
John Coles

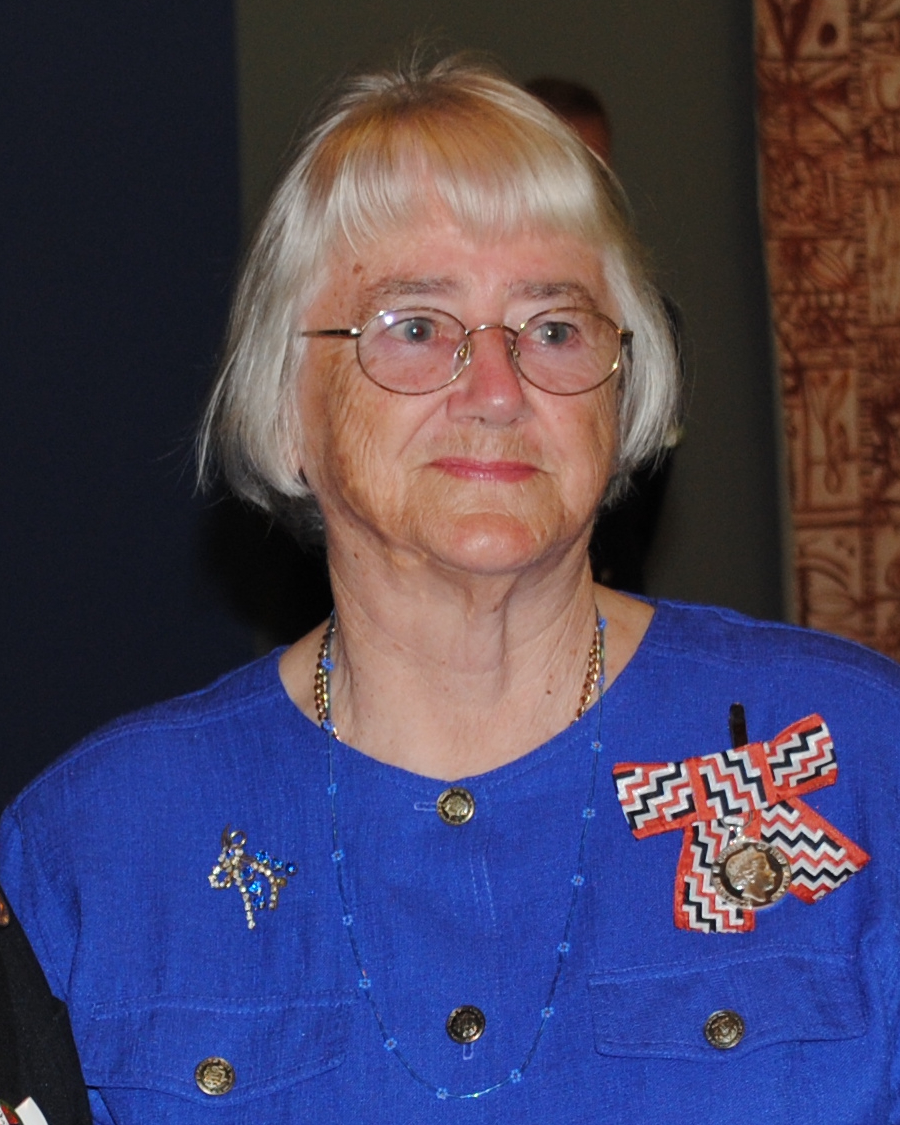
Ada McCallum

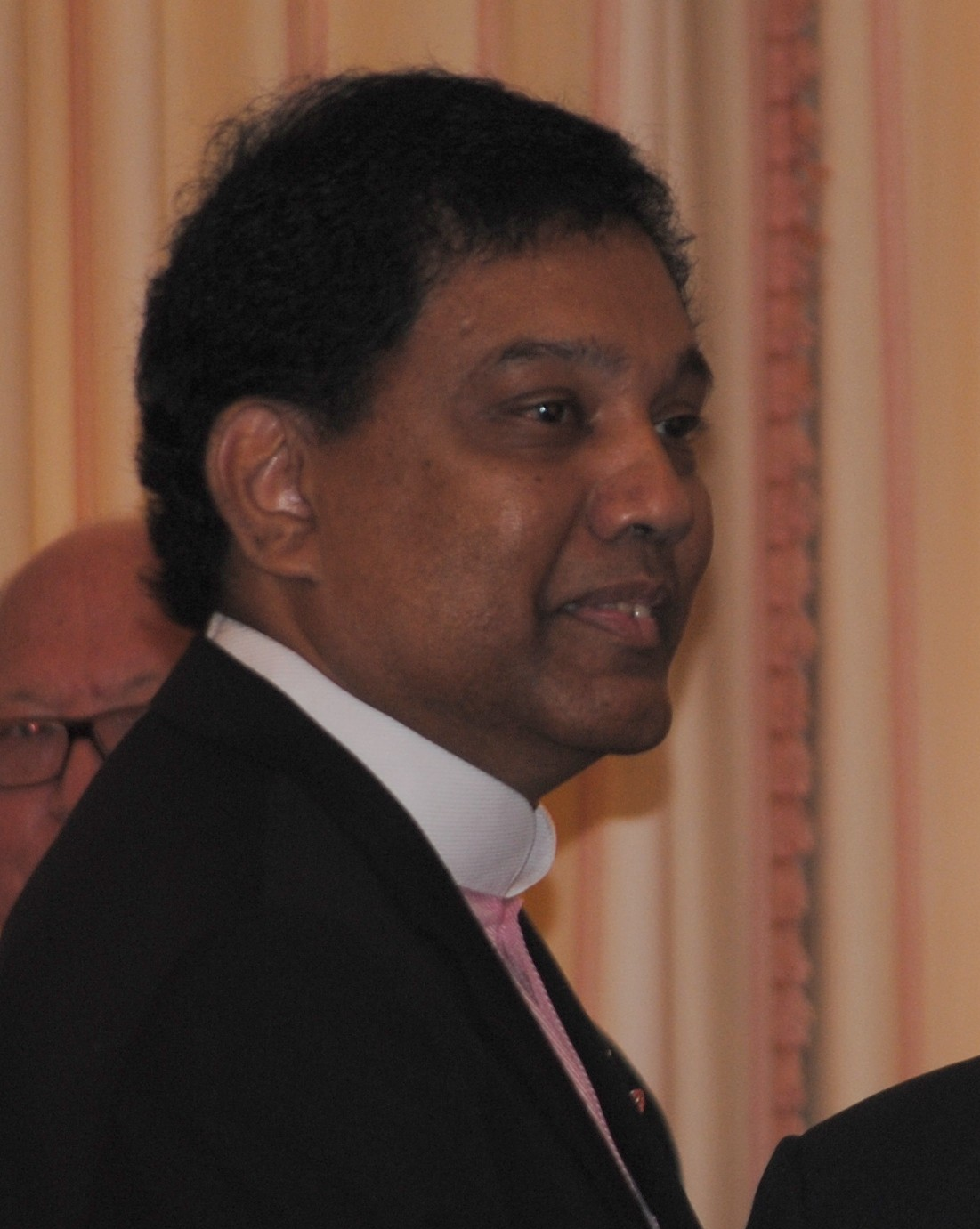
Pancha Narayanan

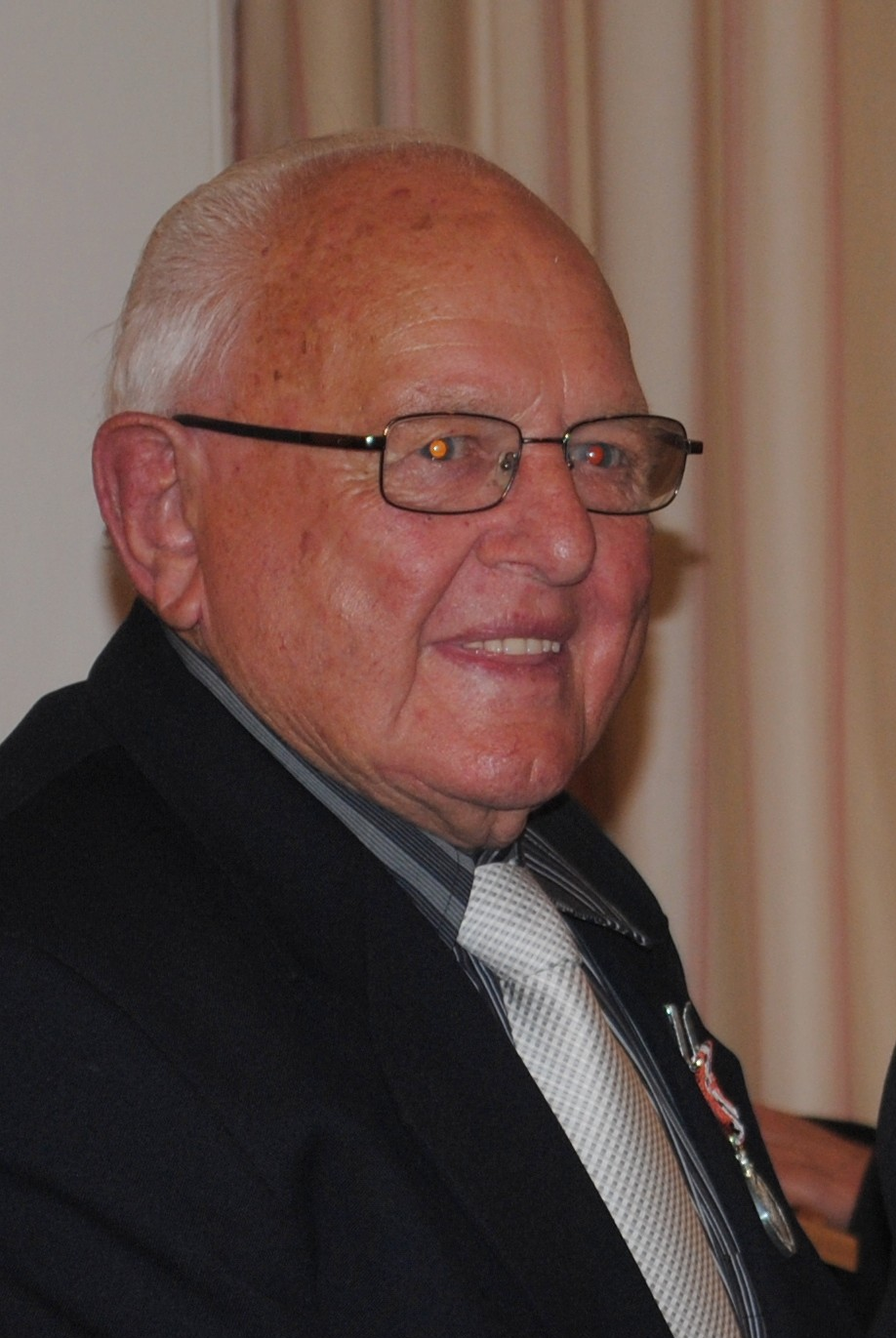
Max Page

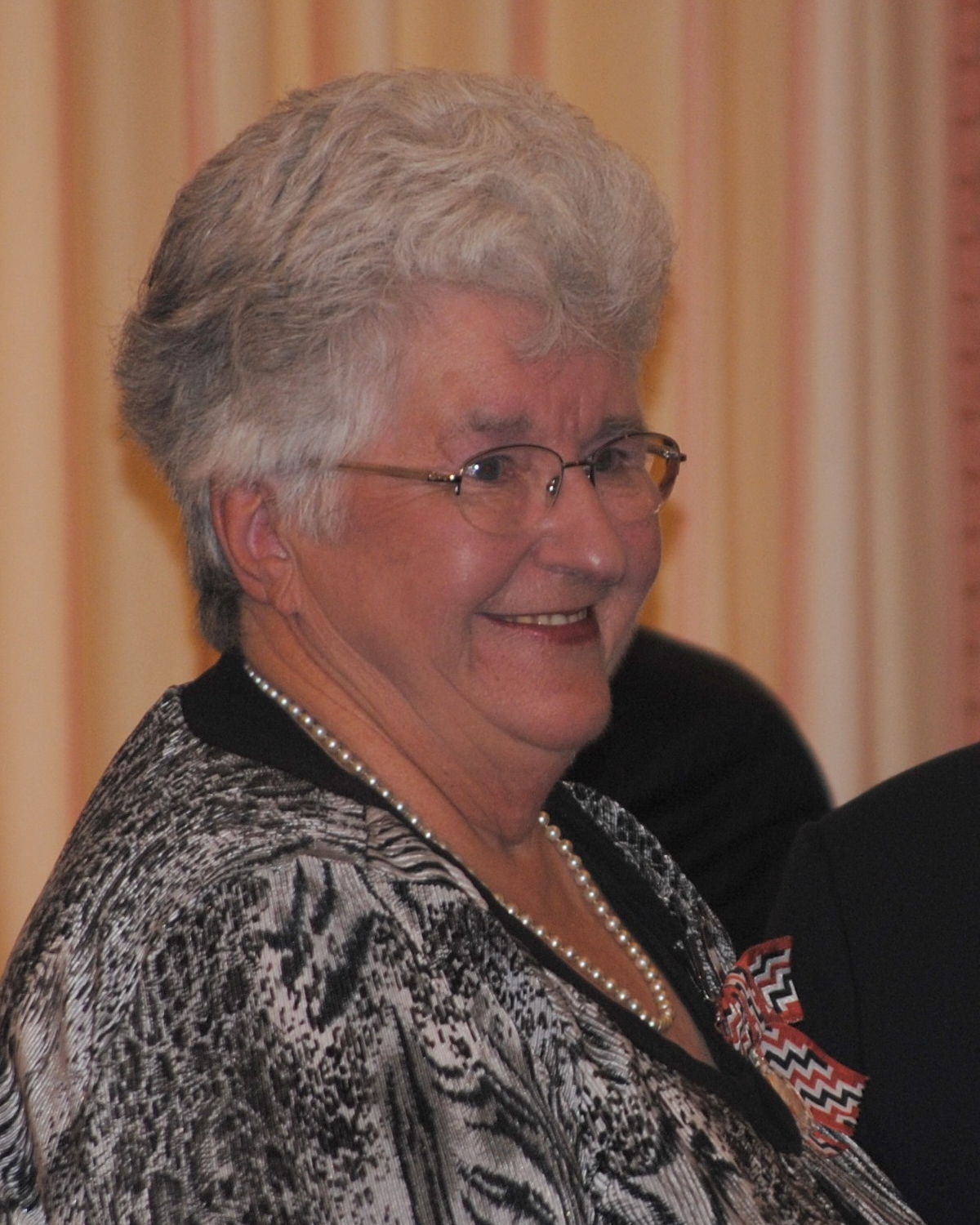
Jean Thompson‑Church

== New Zealand Antarctic Medal (NZAM) ==
- Professor Peter John Barrett – of Wellington. For services to Antarctic science.
- Dr David Lawrence Harrowfield – of Christchurch. For services to Antarctic research.
- Professor Timothy Raymond Naish – of Lower Hutt. For services to Antarctic climate science.
- Alexander Richard Pyne – of Wellington. For services to Antarctic engineering.
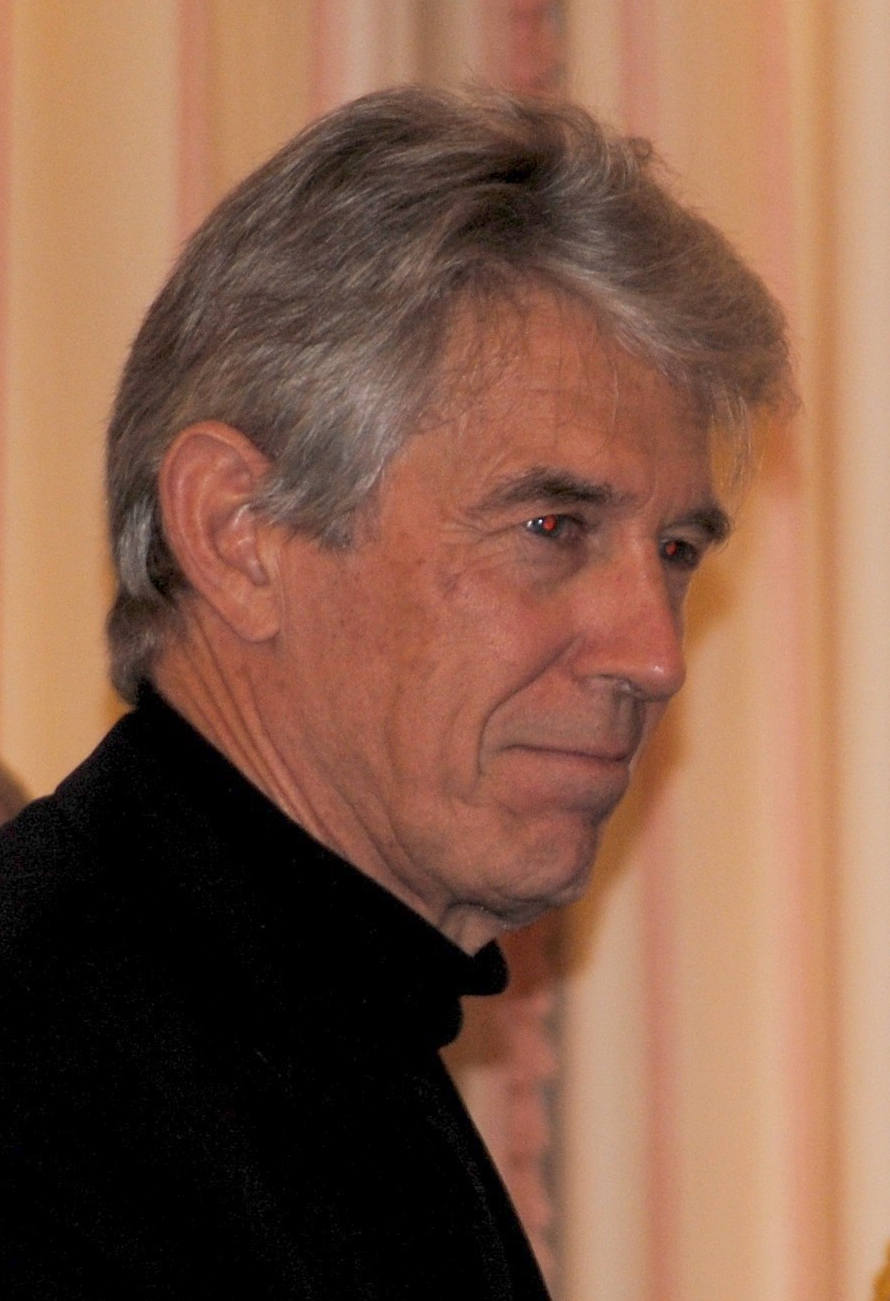
Peter Barrett

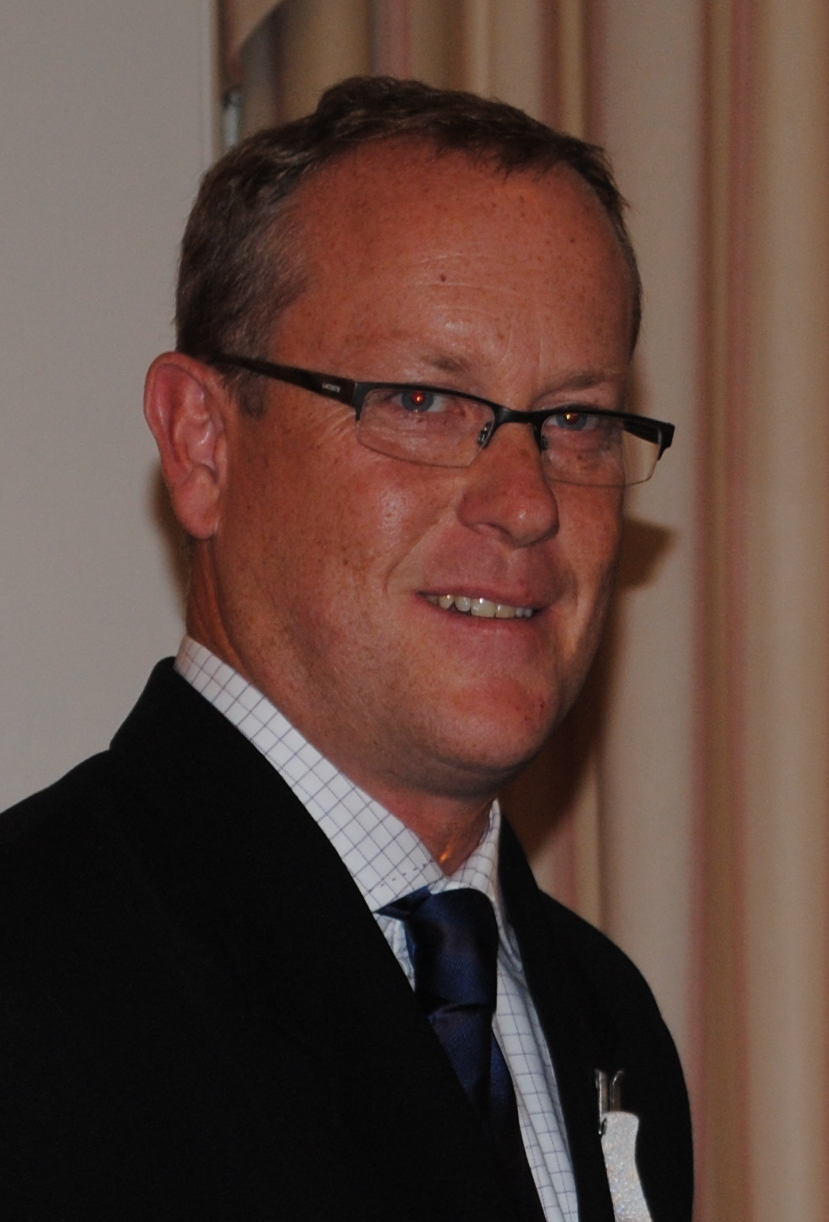
Tim Naish

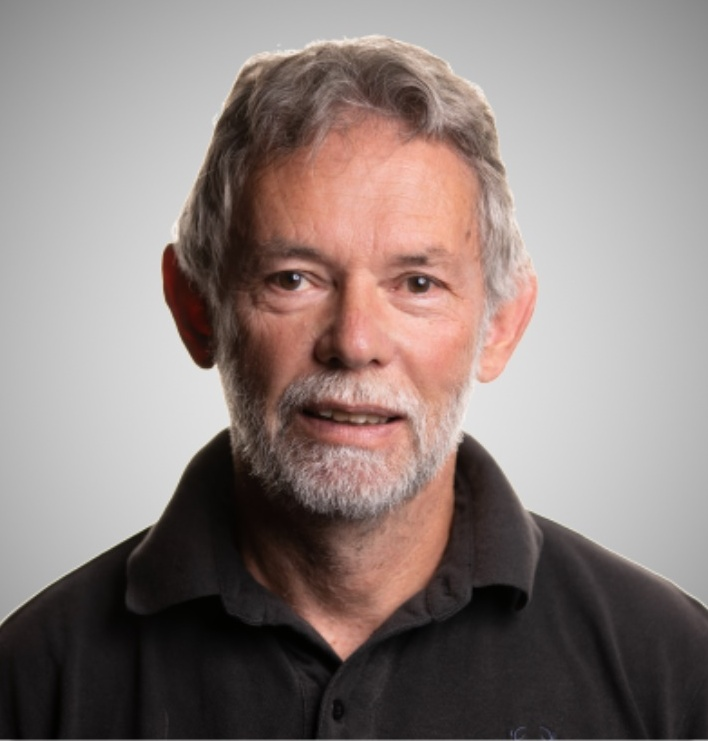
Alex Pyne

== New Zealand Distinguished Service Decoration (DSD) ==
- Major Dougal Andrew Barker – Royal New Zealand Armoured Corps, New Zealand Defence Force, of Palmerston North. For services to the New Zealand Defence Force.
- Wing Commander Mark Stanley Brunton – Royal New Zealand Air Force, New Zealand Defence Force, of Lower Hutt. For services to the New Zealand Defence Force.
- Major Bryce Cameron Gurney – The Corps of Royal New Zealand Engineers, New Zealand Defence Force, of Upper Hutt. For services to the New Zealand Defence Force.
- Major Peter Wayne Jacobs – Royal New Zealand Army Medical Corps, New Zealand Defence Force, of Lower Hutt. For services to the New Zealand Defence Force.
