= Douglas Myers =

New Zealand businessman (1938–2017)

Sir Arthur Douglas Myers KNZM CBE (29 October 1938 – 8 April 2017) was a New Zealand businessman and one of the country's richest men (#35 on the Forbes New Zealand and Australian Rich list, 2006, with net worth estimated at AU$350 million, and assessed as worth $950m and New Zealand's ninth richest man according to the National Business Review.

== Early life and education ==
Born in Auckland on 29 October 1938, Myers was educated at King's College, Auckland. He studied at the University of Cambridge, where he earned a Bachelor of Arts degree in history, and at Harvard University, and completed the PMD course at Harvard Business School.

== Business career ==
Myers began his involvement with what would become Lion Nathan in 1965, being appointed CEO of Campbell & Ehrenfried, following in the footsteps of his father Sir Kenneth Myers and grandfather Sir Arthur Myers. A series of mergers and cross shareholdings led to the creation of Lion Breweries and then Lion Nathan. Myers played a leading role in Lion for over 15 years as MD, CEO, and ultimately as chairman in 1997. In 1998, Myers sold most of his 16% share holding to Kirin Brewery Company (creating the fourth-largest brewing firm in the world) for $312 million.

== Later life and death ==
He moved to London in semi-retirement retaining some business and philanthropic interests, including a stake in Cameron O'Reilly's private-equity group Bayard Capital and regularly donating to the Myers Scholarship. He remained active in two family businesses, Chiltern International and Downtown Music Publishing.

In late 2015, Myers was fighting cancer with aggressive new treatments, including the latest immunotherapy medicines. He died in London on 8 April 2017.

== Honours and awards ==
In the 1991 New Year Honours, Myers was appointed a Commander of the Order of the British Empire, for services to business management. In 2003, he was inducted into the New Zealand Business Hall of Fame. In the 2010 New Year Honours, Myers was appointed a Knight Companion of the New Zealand Order of Merit, for services to business and the community.
