= List of education journals =

This page lists peer-reviewed journals in educational and closely related fields.

== Discipline-specific ==
=== Arts and humanities ===
- Arts Education Policy Review
- Arts and Humanities in Higher Education

==== Business and economics ====
- Academy of Management Learning and Education
- Journal of Economic Education
- Journal of Marketing Education

==== Ethics and philosophy ====
- Journal of Moral Education
- Teaching Ethics
- Teaching Philosophy

==== Governance and politics ====
- Teaching Public Administration

==== History ====
- The History Teacher

=== Healthcare ===
- American Journal of Pharmaceutical Education
- African Journal for Physical Health Education, Recreation and Dance
- Health Education Journal
- Health Education Research
- The Journal of Chiropractic Education
- Journal of Continuing Education in Nursing
- Medical Education
- Medical Teacher

=== Languages ===
- Asian Journal of Applied Linguistics
- Assessing Writing
- Fremdsprachen und Hochschule
- Hispania
- International Multilingual Research Journal
- Japanese Language and Literature
- Journal of Second Language Writing
- Journal of Writing Research
- Language Learning
- Language Teaching Research
- Language Testing
- The Reading Teacher
- Second Language Research
- Studies in Language Testing
- System

==== English ====
- College English
- English for Specific Purposes World
- English Journal
- Journal of Literacy Research

=== Law ===
- Asian Journal of Legal Education

=== Mathematics ===
- Crux Mathematicorum
- Educational Studies in Mathematics
- International Journal of Science and Mathematics Education
- Journal for Research in Mathematics Education
- Journal of Mathematics Teacher Education
- Journal of Statistics Education
- Mathematics and Computer Education
- Mathematics Education Research Journal
- Mathematics Magazine
- Philosophy of Mathematics Education Journal
- Teaching Mathematics and Its Applications
- The Mathematics Educator
- The Mathematics Enthusiast
- The Mathematical Gazette

=== Music ===
- Bulletin of the Council for Research in Music Education
- International Journal of Music Education
- Journal of Music Teacher Education
- Journal of Music Theory Pedagogy
- Journal of Research in Music Education
- Music Educators Journal
- UPDATE: Applications of Research in Music Education

=== Physical education ===
- African Journal for Physical Health Education, Recreation and Dance
- European Physical Education Review
- Journal of Physical Education (Maringá)

=== Social science ===
==== Social work ====
- Journal of Social Work Education

==== Sociology ====
- Social Education
- Teaching Sociology

=== Science ===
- Journal of Research in Science Teaching
- Resonance

==== Applied ====
- The Journal of Food Science Education

==== Biology ====
- Journal of Biological Education

==== Chemistry ====
- Chemistry Education Research and Practice
- Education for Chemical Engineers
- Journal of Chemical Education

==== Engineering ====
- Journal of Engineering Education
- Journal of Faculty of Engineering

==== Physics ====
- American Journal of Physics
- European Journal of Physics
- Physical Review Special Topics: Physics Education Research
- Physics Education
- The Physics Teacher

== Educational psychology ==
- Assessment for Effective Intervention
- British Journal of Educational Psychology
- Canadian Journal of School Psychology
- Contemporary Educational Psychology
- Early Childhood Research Quarterly
- Educational and Psychological Measurement
- Educational Psychologist
- Educational Psychology Review
- International Journal of Mentoring and Coaching in Education
- Journal of Educational Psychology
- Journal of Positive Behavior Interventions
- Journal of Psychoeducational Assessment
- Journal of Research in Reading
- Learning and Individual Differences
- Mind, Brain, and Education
- Psychology in the Schools
- School Psychology

== Educational technology ==
- Australasian Journal of Educational Technology
- British Journal of Educational Technology
- Bulletin of Science, Technology & Society
- Computers in Education
- Educational Technology & Society
- IEEE Transactions on Learning Technologies
- International Journal of Mobile and Blended Learning
- Journal of Computer-Mediated Communication
- Virtual Reality in the Schools

== Learner-specific ==
=== Deaf studies ===
- American Annals of the Deaf
- Journal of Deaf Studies and Deaf Education
- Sign Language Studies

=== Special education ===
- Adult Learning
- British Journal of Special Education
- Exceptional Children
- Focus on Autism and Other Developmental Disabilities
- Gifted Child Quarterly
- Gifted Child Today
- Journal for the Education of the Gifted
- Journal of Early Intervention
- Journal of Learning Disabilities
- Journal of Research in Special Educational Needs
- Journal of Special Education and Rehabilitation
- Learning Disability Quarterly
- Remedial and Special Education
- Research and Practice for Persons with Severe Disabilities
- Support for Learning
- Teacher Education and Special Education
- Teaching Exceptional Children
- Young Exceptional Children

== Teacher education ==
- Teaching and Teacher Education

== Educational research ==
=== Assessment ===
- Assessment in Education

=== Comparative Education ===
- Comparative Education
- Comparative Education Review
- Current Issues in Comparative Education
- International Journal of Comparative Education and Development

=== Distance education ===
- American Journal of Distance Education

=== Diversity in education ===
- Inclusive Education
- International Journal of Inclusive Education
- International Journal of Multicultural Education
- Journal of Diversity in Higher Education
- Race Ethnicity and Education

=== General education ===
- American Educator
- British Journal of Educational Studies
- British Educational Research Journal
- Education Journal
- Educational Practice and Theory
- Power and Education
- Ricerche di Pedagogia e Didattica
- Studies in Educational Evaluation
- Teachers and Teaching
- Teachers College Record
- Oxford Review of Education
- The Clearing House: A Journal of Educational Strategies, Issues and Ideas

=== International education ===
- International Journal of Comparative Education and Development
- Journal of Research in International Education
- Journal of Studies in International Education

=== Level of education ===
==== Early childhood education ====
- Early Childhood Education Journal
- Early Childhood Research Quarterly
- Journal of Early Childhood Literacy

==== Primary education ====
- Elementary School Journal

==== Secondary education ====
- Career Development and Transition for Exceptional Individuals
- The High School Journal

==== Tertiary education ====
- Active Learning in Higher Education
- College Quarterly
- College Teaching
- Community College Review
- Higher Education
- Higher Education for the Future
- Higher Education Review
- The Journal of Higher Education
- The Review of Higher Education
- Teaching in Higher Education

==== Life-long learning ====
- Adult Education Quarterly

=== Management and policy ===
- Contemporary Education Dialogue
- Education Finance and Policy
- Education Policy Analysis Archives
- Educational Administration Quarterly
- Educational Evaluation and Policy Analysis
- Educational Management Administration & Leadership
- Educational Policy
- Journal of Education Policy
- Journal of Educational Administration and History
- Management in Education

=== Sociology of education ===
- British Journal of Sociology of Education
- Education, Citizenship and Social Justice
- Educational Philosophy and Theory
- Gender and Education
- Journal of Philosophy of Education
- Sociology of Education

== See also ==
- Career and technical education
- Computational education
- List of online educational resources
- List of educational software
