= Steven Forness =

American psychologist

Steven Forness (born May 13, 1939) is a psychologist doing research in the field of emotional disorders in children. His main interest is the "early detection and eligibility of children with psychiatric disorders for special education services in public schools". He has earned many awards and is a Distinguished Professor Emeritus of Psychiatry and Biobehavioral Sciences at the University of California, Los Angeles.

== Background information ==
Forness was born in Denver, Colorado to Robert E. and Rejeana C. (Houck) Forness. He attended Catholic schools and was raised as a Catholic. Forness served in the United States Army from 1957 to 1959 as a Specialist 4 in the U.S. Army Security Agency. He received a Bachelor of Arts degree in English Education from the University of Northern Colorado in 1963, after attending the United States Naval Academy for a year. He earned a Master of Arts degree in Educational/School Psychology in 1964, followed by an Ed.D. in Special Education from the University of California at Los Angeles in 1968.

== Education ==
Forness attended the United States Military Academy Preparatory School (USMAPS) while on active duty with the US Army. He later went on to the United States Naval Academy for less than a year and then attended the Colorado State Teachers College (now the University of Northern Colorado). His undergraduate specialization was in English and Education and he earned a master's degree in Educational Psychology there.

== Career ==
Forness began his career at Santa Maria High School in Santa Maria, California from 1964 to 1966. He subsequently enrolled at UCLA and completed a dissertation, entitled "Lateral Dominance in Retarded Readers with Signs of Brain Dysfunction". From 1966 to 1968, he was a special education counselor at UCLA. He then became a special educator at the UCLA Neuropsychiatric Institute (1968–2003).Forness obtained a Senior Fulbright Scholarship to work in Portugal in 1976. He was also the Chief of the Educational Psychology Child Outpatient Department (1970–2003), member of the Mental Retardation Research Center (1970–2003), Professor of Psychiatry (1972–2003), Principal Inpatient Scholar (1976–2003), and Director of Mental Retardation and Developmental Disabilities training program (1985–1992).

Forness co-authored the Handbook of Learning Disabilities, Volumes I, II, and III with Kenneth Kavale and Michael Bender, and together with Kavale wrote Science of Learning Disabilities (1985) and Nature of Learning Disabilities (1995).

== Other contributions ==
Forness served on the grant review panel for the Special Education section of the United States Department of Education.

== Awards and honors ==
Forness received the Distinguished Educator Alumni Award from the University of Northern Colorado in 2006 and is a Distinguished Professor Emeritus at UCLA. He is a fellow at the International Academy of Research in Learning Disabilities and American Association of Mental Retardation. He is a member of Teacher Educators for Children with Behavior Disorders, of which he was president from 1985 to 1986 and also received a Leadership Award in 1995. This society also created the Forness Regional Scholarship in 2003. Forness was an Interdisciplinary Council Member for the American Association of University Affiliated Programs in Developmental Disabilities from 1972 to 1989. He has worked extensively with the International Council for Exceptional Children. He was a Delegate of the Assembly from 1988 to 1991, J.E. Wallace Wallin recipient in 1992, the Excellence in Teacher Education recipient in 1995 and served on the Honors Committee from 1999 to 2002. He was in the Order of St. John to Jerusalem, Knights of Malta in 1994. He was named the Teacher Educator of the Year by the Teacher Education Division of CEC and Merrill Press in 1995. Forness was an Executive Committee Member for the Academy on Mental Retardation from 1989 to 1991 and co-chair of the Definition Task Force for the National Mental Health and Special Education Coalition, 1987–2000. He was on the DSM IV subcommittee on learning disorders with the American Psychiatric Association from 1988 to 1994 and received a Best Article of the Year Award from this association. At the Midwest Symposium on Behavioral Disorders in 1993, Forness was given the Leadership Award. He received the Sidney Berman award on Learning Disorders from the American Academy of Child and Adolescent Psychiatry in 2000.

Forness was also on the research panel at the Institute for Developmental Research at San Diego Center for Children in 2005. He was the co-chairman of Practice Parameters on Learning Disabilities committee for the American Academy of Child and Adolescent Psychiatry from 1996 to 1998 and on the Committee of Professional Advisors for the Professional Group for Attention and Related Disorders from 1990 to 1991.

== Editorships ==
Forness has been an editorial board member of the Journal of Learning Disabilities, Journal of School Psychology, Learning Disability Quarterly, Remedial and Special Education, American Journal of Mental Retardation, Behavioral Disorders, Monographs in Behavioral Disorders, Education and Treatment of Children, Learning Disability Research and Practice, Teacher Education and Special Education, Exceptionality, Academy on Mental Retardation Newsletter, Journal of Child and Family Studies, and Emotional and Behavioral Disorders in Youth.

== Publications ==
- Education of Exceptional Learners (with Frank Hewett), Third Edition, 1984.
- Science of Learning Disabilities (with K. Kavale), 1985
- Nature of Learning Disabilities (with K. Kavale), 1995
- Efficacy of Special Education, 1999
- Handbook on the Assessment of Learning Disabilities: Theory, Research, and Practice (with H. Lee Swanson), 1991
- Learning Disabilities and Related Disorders (with E. Sinclair), 2002
- Technological applications, Scruggs, T. E., & Mastropieri, M. A.
- Research and global perspectives in learning disabilities: essays in honor of William M. Cruickshank
- Social Skills in Pictures, Stories, and Songs: A Multisensory Program for Preschool and Early Elementary Students, Serna, L. A., Nielsen, M. E., & Forness, S. R.
