= List of educational psychology journals =

This page lists peer-reviewed academic journals in educational psychology and closely related fields.

- Academy of Management Learning & Education
- American Journal of Distance Education
- African Journal of Educational Studies in Mathematics and Sciences
- American Educational Research Journal
- British Educational Research Journal
- British Journal of Educational Psychology
- Child Development
- Early Childhood Research Quarterly
- Educational and Psychological Measurement
- Educational Psychology
- Educational Research Review
- Educational Researcher
- Elementary School Journal
- Gifted Child Quarterly
- Intelligence
- International Journal of Behavioral Development
- Journal of Educational and Behavioral Statistics
- Journal of Educational Measurement
- Journal of Educational Psychology
- Journal of Learning Disabilities
- Journal of the Learning Sciences
- Journal of Psychological Science
- Journal of Research in Reading
- Learning and Individual Differences
- Reading Research Quarterly
- Review of Educational Research
- Review of Research in Education
- Science Education
