= Robert Koegel =

American psychologist

Robert Koegel is a senior research scientist at Stanford University School of Medicine. He was formerly a distinguished professor and the director of the Koegel Autism Center at the University of California, Santa Barbara. He moved to Stanford in 2017.

His career is focused in the area of autism, specializing in language intervention, family support, and school integration. He has published over two hundred articles and papers relating to the treatment of autism, and is presently editing several books on the treatment of autism and positive behavioral support. He is the founding editor of the Journal of Positive Behavior Interventions. Models of his procedures are used in public schools and in parent education programs throughout the United States, and other countries.

He has trained many health care and special education leaders in the United States and abroad. Robert and Lynn Kern Koegel are the developers of Pivotal Response Treatment, an empirically supported treatment for autism based on applied behavior analysis (ABA). They are the recipients of the first annual Children’s Television Workshop Sesame Street Award for “Brightening the Lives of Children," the first annual Autism Speaks award for “Science and Research,” and the International ABA award for “enduring programmatic contributions in behavior analysis.” The Koegels are the recipients of many federal, state, and private foundation grants and gifts for developing interventions and helping families with autism.
