= Nerida =

Nerida is a feminine given name which may refer to:

== People ==
- Nerida Ellerton (born 1942), Australian mathematics educator and historian of mathematics
- Nerida Gregory (born 1956), Australian former tennis player
- Nerida Newton (born 1972), Australian author
- Nerida Stewart, head coach of the Australia men's national netball team since 2022
- Nerida Tyson-Chew (born 1965), Australian music composer, conductor and orchestrator
- Nerida Wilson, Australian marine biologist

== Fictional characters ==
- Nerida Anderson, protagonist of the third episode of Women of the Sun, an Australian miniseries
- Nerida Mullins, in the Australian soap opera Home and Away
