= Symptoms of Being Human =

2016 novel by Jeff Garvin

- Author: Jeff Garvin
- Language: English
- Subject: Transgender youth, Genderqueer youth
- Published: February 2, 2016
- Publisher: Balzer + Bray
- Publication place: United States
- Media type: Print (paperback, hardcover)
- ISBN: 9780062382863

Symptoms of Being Human is a 2016 young adult novel by Jeff Garvin. The book tells the story of young Riley Cavanaugh, a gender fluid adolescent who writes a blog about their experiences and identity. The story revolves around Riley's life and their eventual decision to come out as gender fluid to the world.

== Plot ==
Riley Cavanaugh is a gender fluid teenager whose sense of gender identity shifts regularly; they are sometimes a boy, sometimes a girl, or neither. Riley speaks in first person and does not call themself any third person pronoun. Riley is not out of the closet to their peers or their father, a US congressman, or their mother, feeling their identity is hard to explain or will not be accepted. Though Riley feels masculine or feminine to different degrees at different times and struggles with dysphoria, they choose to appear androgynous so that their gender will not be assumed. After moving to a new school and struggling with people's perception of them and being bullied, Riley begins to write an anonymous blog under the pseudonym "Alix" about gender fluidity, even giving advice to readers facing similar problems. While the blog is at first a liberating outlet, things take a turn for the worse when an anonymous person claims to know Riley's real identity and threatens to out them.

== Development ==
Garvin states that his goal in writing the book was to emphasize how hard it is for gender fluid people to live in a world that is heavily influenced by the construct of gender. He added that:

It’s important to point out that [in real life], most gender fluid people can’t avoid gendered pronouns—they’re everywhere... my point: language is a powerful tool for shaping thoughts. So, if a nonbinary person asks you to address them using a pronoun that seems unnatural or awkward to you, honor their request! The awkwardness will pass, your friend will feel respected, and you’ll have taken a significant step toward rewiring your brain and the brains of those with whom you speak.

== Reception ==
Symptoms of Being Human was a first in the representation of gender fluid people, and was well received by critics and audiences alike.

The book received starred reviews from Publishers Weekly, School Library Journal, and Booklist, as well as a positive review from The Bulletin of the Center for Children's Books. The book not only received recognition as a Lambda Literary Award finalist but was also on the YALSA Top Ten Quick Picks.

In his review for Booklist, Michael Cart iterated that Symptoms of Being Human was "one of the first YA books to deal with the complex issue of gender fluidity. To emphasize the dynamic nature of this situation, the author avoids references to Riley’s birth-assigned gender. This means eschewing personal pronouns, a device some readers will find frustrating but nevertheless underscores readers’ instincts to put individuals into a box." Publishers Weekly echoed the sentiment, applauding Garvin for his ability to "teach his readers about gender and gender fluidity" without the knowledge "weighing [the story] down."

Kirkus provided a mixed review, explaining that multiple aspects of the story "ring false, and the book's insistence that transgender and gender-fluid teens should all come out seems less than carefully reasoned." With praise, they noted, "Riley's family relationships and growing friendships, however, are vibrantly imagined, and the panic attacks are well-illustrated." They concluded their review saying the book was "a welcome mirror for gender-fluid teens and a helpful introduction for others." Writing for The Bulletin of the Center for Children's Books, April Spisak made a similar comment, stating, "The overall emphasis on coming out being the primary goal for all teens feels unrealistic if well-intentioned, but this is undoubtedly an important introduction for readers who know little about gender fluidity and a welcome nod to those who may be experiencing similar feelings."

In a similarly mixed review for Lambda Literary, Sawyer Lovett wrote, "There are some tropes that are hard not to call upon in a coming out novel–the family strife, the physical violence, the unexpected love story. But those tropes exist for a reason: queer people are often victims of assault, sometimes our parents aren’t cool with our gender identities or sexuality, and love rules."

Beyond popular media, Symptoms of Being Human has been analyzed in academic journals, including English Journal and Health Education.

Although the book generally received positive critics from the audience, there were also some negative critiques. The author never identifies Riley's biological sex and placing emphasis on coming out as gender fluid can be perceived unrealistic.

Accolades for Symptoms of Being Human
Year	Accolade	Result	Ref.
2016	Goodreads Choice Award for Young Adult Fiction	Nominee	
2016	YALSA's Amazing Audiobooks for Young Adults	Nominee	
2017	ALA Rainbow List	Selection	
2017	YALSA's Quick Picks for Reluctant Young Adult Readers	Top 10	
2017	YALSA's Best Fiction for Young Adults	Selection	
2018	Rhode Island Teen Book Award	Nominee	
