= Educational Practice and Theory =

- Discipline: Education
- Language: English
- Edited by: Joseph Zajda

Publication details
- Former name: New Education
- History: 1978–present
- Publisher: James Nicholas Publishers (Australia)
- Frequency: Biannually

Standard abbreviations
- ISO 4: Educ. Pract. Theory

Indexing
- ISSN: 1323-577X (print); 2201-0599 (web)

Links
- Journal homepage

Educational Practice and Theory is a bi-annual, peer-reviewed academic journal focused on education. The journal focuses on the theoretical and practical elements of the field of education. The journal is published in Australia by James Nicholas Publishers.

== See also ==
- List of education journals
- Educational psychology
