= Asian Journal of Applied Linguistics =

- Discipline: Linguistics
- Language: English
- Edited by: David Gardner; Derek Chan

Publication details
- Former name(s): Hong Kong Journal of Applied Linguistics (1996-2013); Hong Kong Papers in Linguistics and Language Teaching (語言理論教學研究) (1989-1995); Working Papers in Linguistics and Language Teaching (語言理論教學研究特刊( (1980-1988); Working Papers in Language and Language Teaching (1979)
- History: 1979–present
- Publisher: Centre for Applied English Studies (Hong Kong)
- Frequency: Biannually
- Open access: Yes

Standard abbreviations
- ISO 4: Asian J. Appl. Linguist.

Indexing
- ISSN: 2308-6262

Links
- Journal homepage

The Asian Journal of Applied Linguistics is a bi-annual, peer-reviewed academic journal focused on the field of linguistics, particularly the study and learning of English. The journal was established in 1979 and is published by the Centre for Applied English Studies at the University of Hong Kong.

== History ==
In its current form, the Journal was previously published as the Hong Kong Journal of Applied Linguistics, beginning in 1996. In 2013, the Journal changed its name to the Asian Journal of Applied Linguistics as its scope expanded to include the rest of Asia and reduce the focus on Hong Kong.

== Reputation ==
The Journal is included in the Excellence in Research for Australia Journal List which is compiled by the Australian Government's Research Council.

== Accessibility ==
The journal publishes all material in open access format.

== See also ==
- List of education journals
- Educational psychology
