= Mike Baker (journalist) =

British journalist

Michael Baker (16 February 1957 – 22 September 2012) was a British journalist best known for his work with the BBC.

Educated at Colchester Royal Grammar School in Essex and Emmanuel College, Cambridge, he joined the BBC on their graduate trainee scheme in 1980. He was the corporation's education correspondent from 1989 until 2007, when he left the BBC's staff. Before that he was a BBC political correspondent from 1980 to 1989 and also spent brief periods as a foreign correspondent and deputy home news editor at the BBC. Baker was a regular columnist for BBC News Online, the EducationGuardian, and the Education Journal. He presented several series of programmes on Teachers TV.

Baker's publications include Who Rules Our Schools (Hodder & Stoughton) and A Parents' Guide to the New Curriculum (BBC Books). He was the first journalist to be appointed visiting professor at the Institute of Education. Baker held a 2000 Michigan Journalism Fellowship at the University of Michigan and was a Reuters Fellow at Green College, Oxford. He was also an Honorary Fellow of the College of Teachers and was the CIPR Education Journalist of the Year in 2008.

Baker died in September 2012, aged 55. He had been receiving treatment for lung cancer, which he wrote about publicly in his blog.
