= Sarah Speight =

British historian

Sarah Speight FRSA
- Awards: National Teaching Fellowship

Academic background
- Education: University of Manchester; University of Nottingham
- Thesis: Family, Faith and Fortification: Yorkshire 1066–1250 (1993)
- Doctoral advisor: Philip Dixon

Academic work
- Discipline: Archaeology; Higher education; History
- Sub-discipline: Castellology; Medieval archaeology
- Institutions: Nottingham Trent University; University of Nottingham; Thoroton Society of Nottinghamshire; Castle Studies Group

Sarah Speight is a British academic and Deputy Vice Chancellor at Nottingham Trent University. Previously, she was Professor of Higher Education and Pro Vice Chancellor for Education and Student Experience at the University of Nottingham prior to which she was head of the School of Education.

Speight studied at the University of Manchester and went on to complete a PhD at the University of Nottingham. Her research spans the fields of higher education, archaeology and history.

== Education ==
Speight studied at the University of Manchester where she completed a Bachelor of Arts in history. She went on to study at the University of Nottingham, completing a Master of Arts in 1989 and a PhD at the same institution in 1993, titled Family, faith and fortification: Yorkshire 1066–1250, the latter under the supervision of Philip Dixon.

== Career ==
Speight works at Nottingham Trent University, joining as Deputy Vice Chancellor in August 2024. Prior to this she was Pro Vice Chancellor for Education and Student Experience at the University of Nottingham where she also taught for the Schools of Continuing Education, Education, and History. She was also head of the university's School of Education for five years.

After completing her PhD, Speight took up a part-time teaching role at the University of Nottingham in the Department of Adult Education. In 2006, she received the university's Lord Dearing Award, which recognises "outstanding achievements ... in enhancing the student learning experience". In 2013, Speight was awarded a National Teaching Fellowship.

Speight was Honorary Treasurer of the Castle Studies Group between 1998 and 2001. Between 2001 and 2006, Speight was the Archaeology Editor for the Transactions of the Thoroton Society of Nottinghamshire. Her specialism in castles led to her appearing in episodes of Time Team about Beaudesert Castle (2002) and Codnor Castle (2008). Speight was part of a movement examining the impact of castles on settlements and the landscape; Speight contributed a study of castle chapels to this area.

In July 2024, Speight took up the position of Deputy Vice-Chancellor at Nottingham Trent University.

== Selected publications ==
Speight has published articles in venues such as Journal of Educational Administration and History, Château Gaillard: Études de castellologie médiévale, History Compass, and the Transactions of the Thoroton Society of Nottinghamshire.

=== Castle studies and archaeology ===
- Speight, Sarah (1994). "Early medieval castles in Nottinghamshire, Early Medieval Castle Sites in Nottinghamshire". Transactions of the Thoroton Society of Nottinghamshire. 98: 58–70.
- Speight, Sarah (2000). "Castle warfare in the Gesta Stephani". Château Gaillard: Études de castellologie médiévale. 19: 269–274.
- Speight, Sarah (2002). "Digging for history: Archaeological fieldwork and the adult student 1943–1975". Studies in the Education of Adults. 34 (1): 68–85. doi:10.1080/02660830.2002.11661462. ISSN 0266-0830. S2CID 140753570.
- Speight, Sarah (2004). "British Castle Studies in the Late 20th and 21st Centuries". History Compass. 2 (1): **. doi:10.1111/j.1478-0542.2004.00086.x. ISSN 1478-0542.
- Speight, Sarah (2004). "Religion in the bailey: charters, chapels and the clergy'Q47501496". Château Gaillard: Études de castellologie médiévale. 21: 271–280.
- Speight, Sarah (2008). "Castles as Past Culture: Living with Castles in the Post-Medieval World". Château Gaillard: Études de castellologie médiévale. 23: 247–256.
- Speight, Sarah (2008). "Castles as Past Culture 2: Adaptation and Identity in the Post-Life of Castles". The Castle Studies Group Journal. 22: 268–275.

=== Education ===
- Speight, Sarah; Lackovic, Natasa; Cooker, Lucy (2012). "Stakeholder attitudes towards employability in a Sino-British university". Journal of Teaching and Learning for Graduate Employability. 3 (1): 26–40. doi:10.21153/jtlge2012vol3no1art556.
- Speight, Sarah; Lackovic, Natasa; Cooker, Lucy (2013). "The Contested Curriculum: Academic learning and employability in higher education". Tertiary Education and Management. 19 (2): 112–126. doi:10.1080/13583883.2012.756058. ISSN 1358-3883. S2CID 145368176.
- Sivapalan, Subarna; Clifford, Michael J.; Speight, Sarah (2016). "Engineering education for sustainable development: using online learning to support the new paradigms" (PDF). Australasian Journal of Engineering Education. 21 (2): 61–73. doi:10.1080/22054952.2017.1307592. ISSN 2205-4952. S2CID 115048925.
- Speight, Sarah (2018), "The Mainstreaming of Massive Open Online Courses (MOOCs)", in Milana, Marcella; Webb, Sue; Holford, John; Waller, Richard (eds.), The Palgrave International Handbook on Adult and Lifelong Education and Learning, London: Palgrave Macmillan UK, pp. 939–956, doi:10.1057/978-1-137-55783-4_48, ISBN 978-1-137-55782-7
