= African Journal for Physical Activity and Health Sciences =

Academic journal

- Discipline: Physical education
- Language: English

Publication details
- Former names: African Journal for Physical Health Education, Recreation and Dance
- History: 1995–present
- Publisher: LAM Publications
- Frequency: Quarterly

Standard abbreviations
- ISO 4: Afr. J. Phys. Act. Health Sci.

Indexing
- ISSN: 2411-6939
- OCLC no.: 982183387

Links
- Journal homepage

The African Journal for Physical Activity and Health Sciences (known as the African Journal for Physical Health Education, Recreation and Dance before 2016) is a quarterly peer-reviewed academic journal. It covers physical education, health education, and dance in Africa (including sports). It is published by LAM Publications (Nigeria) and hosted by African Journals OnLine.
