= Nerida Ellerton =

Australian mathematics educator and historian of mathematics

- Born: Nerida Fay Gersch; 1942 (age 83–84)

Academic background
- Education: University of Adelaide (PhD)
- Thesis: The interaction of aminoacridines and aminobenzacridines with DNA (1966)

Academic work
- Institutions: Edith Cowan University; University of Southern Queensland; Illinois State University

Nerida Fay Ellerton (née Gersch, born 1942) is an Australian mathematics educator and historian of mathematics. She is professor of mathematics education at Illinois State University. As well as studying the present state of mathematics education, she and her husband McKenzie A. (Ken) Clements have researched the history of mathematics education, in the process discovering school worksheets in the Harvard Library that are among the oldest known writings of Abraham Lincoln.

== Education and career ==
Ellerton was born in 1942; her father was a schoolteacher in a small school in the Australian Outback. She completed a Ph.D. in physical and inorganic chemistry in 1966, at the University of Adelaide; her dissertation was The interaction of aminoacridines and aminobenzacridines with DNA.

By the 1980s she worked in mathematics education at Deakin University. She was director of the National Center for Mathematics Education Research from 1992 to 1993, as professor of mathematics education at Edith Cowan University from 1993 to 1997, and as professor and dean of mathematics education at the University of Southern Queensland from 1997 to 2002. While at Edith Cowan University, she also served as editor of the Mathematics Education Research Journal.

Her first husband died in 2001, and Ellerton moved to Illinois State University in 2002. In 2005, she married Clements, another Australian mathematics educator and long-term collaborator; he moved to Illinois State to join her.

== Books ==
Ellerton's books include:

- School Mathematics: The Challenge to Change (edited with M. A. Ken Clements, UNSW Press, 1989)
- The National Curriculum Debacle (with M. A. Ken Clements, Meridian Press, 1994)
- Mathematics Education Research: Past, Present, and Future (with M. A. Ken Clements, UNESCO, 1996)
- Rewriting the History of School Mathematics in North America, 1607–1861: The Central Role of Cyphering Books (with M. A. Ken Clements, Springer, 2012)
- Abraham Lincoln’s Cyphering Book and Ten other Extraordinary Cyphering Books (with M. A. Ken Clements, Springer, 2014)
- Thomas Jefferson and his Decimals 1775–1810: Neglected Years in the History of U.S. School Mathematics (with M. A. Ken Clements, Springer, 2015)
- Mathematical Problem Posing: From Research to Effective Practice (edited with Florence Mihaela Singer and Jinfa Cai, Springer, 2015)
- Samuel Pepys, Isaac Newton, James Hodgson, and the Beginnings of Secondary School Mathematics: A History of the Royal Mathematical School Within Christ's Hospital, London 1673–1868 (with M. A. Ken Clements, Springer, 2017)
- Using Design Research and History to Tackle a Fundamental Problem with School Algebra (with M. A. Ken Clements and Sinan Kanbir, Springer, 2017)
