= Journal of Physical Education (Maringá) =

Brazilian scientific journal

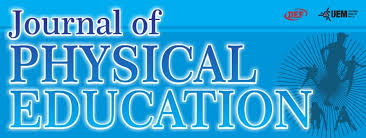
- Discipline: Physical education
- Language: Portuguese, Spanish, English
- Edited by: Carlos Herold Junior

Publication details
- Former name: Revista da Educação Física
- History: 1989–present
- Publisher: State University of Maringá (Brazil)
- Frequency: Continuous
- Open access: yes
- License: CC BY

Standard abbreviations
- ISO 4: J. Phys. Educ. (Maringá)

Indexing
- J. Phys. Educ. (Maringá)
- ISSN: 2448-2455
- Rev. Educ. Fís.
- ISSN: 1983-3083

Links
- Journal homepage; Online archive

Journal of Physical Education is a peer-reviewed academic journal published by the State University of Maringá (Brazil). Established in 1989, it publishes original research articles, review papers, book reviews, interviews, and documents related to physical education, sport, leisure, health, and education. The journal is edited by the Department of Physical Education at the State University of Maringá.

== Aims and scope ==
The journal disseminates research in the field of physical education, seeking to promote the development of academic and professional knowledge in related areas.

== History ==
The journal was discussed in 1988 and launched in 1989 within the Department of Physical Education at the State University of Maringá. It circulated in print from 1989 to 2006 and, in 2007, also moved online using the SEER/OJS platform. In 2007 it also became affiliated with the newly created joint graduate program in Physical Education (UEL–UEM). In 2008 it adopted DOIs for its publications, one of the first Brazilian journals in the field to do so.

== Open access and policies ==
The journal is open access under a Creative Commons CC BY license and adopts policies aligned with open science, including acceptance of preprints, encouragement to share data, code and materials in open repositories, citation of datasets, and optional open peer review by agreement of the parties.

== Abstracting and indexing ==
The journal is abstracted and indexed in:

- Scopus (Source ID 21100812853).
- SciELO.

It is listed in:

- DOAJ.
- OpenAlex (Source ID S4210198785).

== See also ==
- List of education journals – Physical education
