= Education Journal =

Education Journal 教育學報
- Discipline: Education
- Language: Chinese, English
- Edited by: Esther Sui-Chu Ho (何瑞珠)

Publication details
- Former name(s): Studium (學記)
- History: 1968–present
- Publisher: Hong Kong Institute of Educational Research (Hong Kong)

Standard abbreviations
- ISO 4: Educ. J. (Hong Kong)

Indexing
- ISSN: 1025-1936 (print); 2227-0256 (web)

Links
- Journal homepage

The Education Journal is a bi-annual, peer-reviewed academic journal focused on the field of education. The journal was established in 1968 and is published by the Hong Kong Institute of Educational Research at the Chinese University of Hong Kong. Articles in the journal are published in either Chinese or English. In 2010, the journal merged with the Journal of Basic Education. After 2018, the journal discontinued its print version, and all subsequent volumes were published online only.

== See also ==
- List of education journals
- Educational psychology
