= European Physical Education Review =

- Discipline: Physical education
- Language: English
- Edited by: Ken Green

Publication details
- Former name: Physical Education Review
- History: 1995-present
- Publisher: SAGE Publications
- Frequency: Quarterly
- Impact factor: 0.438 (2013)

Standard abbreviations
- ISO 4: Eur. Phys. Educ. Rev.

Indexing
- ISSN: 1356-336X (print); 1741-2749 (web)
- LCCN: sn95029442
- OCLC no.: 66958847

Links
- Journal homepage; Online access; Online archive

European Physical Education Review is a quarterly peer-reviewed academic journal that covers the field of physical education including sport and leisure issues and research. The journal was established in 1995 and is published by SAGE Publications in association with the North West Counties Physical Education Association.

== Abstracting and indexing ==
The journal is abstracted and indexed in Scopus and the Social Sciences Citation Index. According to the Journal Citation Reports, its 2013 impact factor is 0.438, ranking it 154th out of 219 in the category "Education & Educational Research".
