= International Journal of Mentoring and Coaching in Education =

- Discipline: Education
- Language: English
- Edited by: Andrew Hobson

Publication details
- History: 2012-present
- Publisher: Emerald Publishing
- Frequency: Quarterly
- Open access: Hybrid

Standard abbreviations
- ISO 4: Int. J. Mentor. Coach. Educ.

Indexing
- ISSN: 2046-6854
- LCCN: 2016207655
- OCLC no.: 847157437

Links
- Journal homepage; Online archive

The International Journal of Mentoring and Coaching in Education is a quarterly peer-reviewed academic journal covering research on and theory of coaching and mentoring as it applies to education. It was established in 2012 and is published by Emerald Publishing. The editor-in-chief is Andrew Hobson (University of Brighton).

== Abstracting and indexing ==
The journal is abstracted and indexed by the Emerging Sources Citation Index and Scopus.
