= International Journal of Comparative Education and Development =

- Discipline: Education
- Language: English
- Edited by: Jae Park

Publication details
- Publisher: Emerald Group Publishing

Standard abbreviations
- ISO 4: Int. J. Comp. Educ. Dev.

Indexing
- ISSN: 2309-4907

Links
- Journal homepage

The International Journal of Comparative Education and Development is a peer-reviewed academic journal. The journal is the official journal of the Comparative Education Society of Hong Kong. The journal focuses on topics related to comparative and international education. The journal is connected with the Education University of Hong Kong.
