= The High School Journal =

Academic journal about education

- Discipline: Education
- Language: English

Publication details
- History: 1918 to present
- Publisher: University of North Carolina Press for the School of Education at the University of North Carolina at Chapel Hill (United States)
- Frequency: Quarterly

Standard abbreviations
- ISO 4: High Sch. J.

Indexing
- ISSN: 0018-1498 (print); 1534-5157 (web)
- JSTOR: highschooljour

Links
- Journal homepage; HSJ at UNC Press; HSJ at Project MUSE

The High School Journal is a quarterly peer-reviewed academic journal covering secondary education. It was established in 1918 and is published by the University of North Carolina Press.

== History ==
The High School Journal grew out of the quarterly The North Carolina High School Bulletin which was published from 1910 to 1917, and which was begun with the aim of improving North Carolina schools and was edited by Prof. N. W. Walker. In 2018 it celebrated its 100th year of publication under the present title. During its early years it was dedicated primarily to improving high school teaching and management in the southern United States, particularly in North Carolina, and was published monthly during the 1920s and 30s. The Journal also published investigations into problems in high schools in North Carolina.
