= Career Development and Transition for Exceptional Individuals =

- Discipline: Special education
- Language: English
- Edited by: Erik W. Carter, Valerie L. Mazzotti

Publication details
- Former name: Career Development for Exceptional Individuals
- History: 1978-present
- Publisher: SAGE Publications
- Frequency: Triannually

Standard abbreviations
- ISO 4: Career Dev. Transit. Except. Individ.

Indexing
- ISSN: 0885-7288 (print); 2165-1442 (web)
- LCCN: 88656142
- OCLC no.: 645362379

Links
- Journal homepage; Online access; Online archive

Career Development and Transition for Exceptional Individuals is a triannual peer-reviewed academic journal that covers research in the fields of secondary education, transition, and career development of people with disabilities. The editors-in-chief are Erik W. Carter (Vanderbilt University) and Valerie L. Mazzotti (University of North Carolina). It was established in 1978 and is currently published by SAGE Publications in association with the Hammill Institute on Disabilities and Division on Career Development and Transition of The Council for Exceptional Children.

== Abstracting and indexing ==
Career Development and Transition for Exceptional Individuals is abstracted and indexed in:

- Contents Pages in Education
- Educational Research Abstracts Online
- ERIC
- PsycINFO
- Scopus
