= Adult Learning =

- Discipline: Adult education
- Language: English
- Edited by: Davin Carr-Chelman, Lilian H. Hill, Carol Rogers-Shaw

Publication details
- History: 1989-present
- Publisher: SAGE Publications on behalf of the American Association for Adult and Continuing Education (United States)
- Frequency: Quarterly

Standard abbreviations
- ISO 4: Adult Learn.

Indexing
- ISSN: 1045-1595 (print); 2162-4070 (web)
- LCCN: 90662500
- OCLC no.: 818916158

Links
- Journal homepage; Online access; Online archive

Adult Learning is a quarterly peer-reviewed academic journal that covers the field of adult education. Adult Learning is an international, peer-reviewed, practice-oriented journal. The journal publishes empirical research and conceptual papers that approach practice issues with a problem-solving emphasis. The audience includes practitioners and researchers who design, manage, teach, and evaluate programs for adult learners in a variety of settings. The journal's editors are Davin Carr-Chellman (University of Dayton), Lilian H. Hill (University of Southern Mississippi), and Carol Rogers-Shaw (University of Dayton). The journal is published by SAGE Publications on behalf of the American Association for Adult and Continuing Education.

== Abstracting and indexing ==
The journal is abstracted and indexed in:

- Academic Search
- EBSCO databases
- ERIC
- ProQuest databases
- InfoTrac
- SCOPUS
