= Educational Management Administration & Leadership =

- Discipline: Management
- Language: English
- Edited by: Tony Bush

Publication details
- History: 1972-present
- Publisher: SAGE Publications on behalf of the British Educational Leadership, Management & Administration Society (United Kingdom)
- Frequency: Bimonthly
- Impact factor: 1.542 (2017)

Standard abbreviations
- ISO 4: Educ. Manag. Adm. Leadersh.

Indexing
- ISSN: 1741-1432 (print); 1741-1440 (web)
- LCCN: 2004249030
- OCLC no.: 473835078

Links
- Journal homepage; Online access; Online archive

Educational Management Administration & Leadership is a bimonthly peer-reviewed academic journal that covers the field of management in education. The editor-in-chief is Tony Bush of the University of Nottingham. It was established in 1972 and is published by SAGE Publications on behalf of the British Educational Leadership, Management & Administration Society.

== Abstracting and indexing ==
The journal is abstracted and indexed in Academic Premier, Current Contents/Social and Behavioral Sciences, Social Sciences Citation Index, and Scopus. According to the Journal Citation Reports, the journal has a 2013 impact factor of 0.405.
