= Contemporary Education Dialogue =

- Discipline: Education
- Language: English
- Edited by: Shailaja Menon and Disha Nawani

Publication details
- History: 2003
- Publisher: SAGE Publishing
- Frequency: Biannual

Standard abbreviations
- ISO 4: Contemp. Educ. Dialogue

Indexing
- ISSN: 0973-1849 (print); 2249-5320 (web)

Links
- Journal homepage; Online access; Online archive

Contemporary Education Dialogue is an open forum for discussing issues in education. It is published twice a year by SAGE Publishing in association with the Education Dialogue Trust. The journal is a member of the Committee on Publication Ethics. It is edited by Shailaja Menon and Disha Nawani.

== Abstracting and indexing ==
The journal is abstracted and indexed in:

- EBSCO databases
- Indian Citation Index
- ProQuest databases
- Scopus
