= Management in Education =

- Discipline: Education
- Language: English
- Edited by: Paul Armstrong

Publication details
- History: 1987-present
- Publisher: SAGE Publications
- Frequency: Quarterly

Standard abbreviations
- ISO 4: Manag. Educ.

Indexing
- ISSN: 0892-0206 (print); 1741-9883 (web)
- LCCN: 91640721
- OCLC no.: 486040265

Links
- Journal homepage; Online access; Online archive

Management in Education (MiE) is a quarterly, peer-reviewed academic journal in the field of educational leadership and management. The journal's editor-in-chief is Paul Armstrong, senior lecturer at The University of Manchester. It was established in 1987 and is currently published by SAGE Publications on behalf of the British Educational Leadership, Management & Administration Society.

The editorial advisory board comprises academics and practitioners from the field of education. MiE provides a forum for debate and discussion covering all aspects of educational management. Our peer review policy helps to enhance the range and quality of the articles accepted supporting those new to publication and those who are more experienced authors. MIE is a quarterly international journal that is offered free to members of the Society.

The journal publishes a range of articles which includes: traditional research articles, opinion pieces, interviews with leading practitioners and academics and news and views about the various special interest groups within BELMAS. It invites contributions by experienced and newer researchers and practitioners.

== Abstracting and indexing ==
Management in Education is abstracted and indexed in:

- Australian Education Index
- British Education Index
- Scopus
- ZETOC
