= Young Exceptional Children =

- Discipline: Special education
- Language: English
- Edited by: Rosa Milagros Santos

Publication details
- History: 1997-present
- Publisher: SAGE Publications
- Frequency: Quarterly

Standard abbreviations
- ISO 4: Young Except. Child.

Indexing
- ISSN: 1096-2506
- LCCN: 98657593
- OCLC no.: 300275397

Links
- Journal homepage; Online archive

Young Exceptional Children is a quarterly peer-reviewed academic journal covering the field of special education. The editor-in-chief is Rosa Milagros Santos (University of Illinois). It was established in 1997 and is currently published by SAGE Publications in association with the Division for Early Childhood of the Council for Exceptional Children.

== Abstracting and indexing ==
Young Exceptional Children is abstracted and indexed in:

- Contents Pages in Education
- ERIC
- NISC
- Scopus
