= Journal of Research in International Education =

- Discipline: Education
- Language: English
- Edited by: Mary Hayden

Publication details
- History: 2002-present
- Publisher: SAGE Publications
- Frequency: Triannually

Standard abbreviations
- ISO 4: J. Res. Int. Educ.

Indexing
- ISSN: 1475-2409 (print); 1741-2943 (web)
- LCCN: 2003233020
- OCLC no.: 51540531

Links
- Journal homepage; Online access; Online archive

The Journal of Research in International Education is a triannual peer-reviewed academic journal covering the field of education. The editor-in-chief is Mary Hayden (University of Bath). It was established in 2002 and is published by SAGE Publications.

== Abstracting and indexing ==
The journal is abstracted and indexed in ERIC, Education Index, Neuroscience Citation Index, and Scopus.
