= Studies in Educational Evaluation =

- Discipline: Education
- Language: English
- Edited by: P. van Petegem

Publication details
- History: 1975–present
- Publisher: Elsevier
- Frequency: Quarterly
- Impact factor: 1.983 (2019)

Standard abbreviations
- ISO 4: Stud. Educ. Eval.

Indexing
- ISSN: 0191-491X
- LCCN: 85645149
- OCLC no.: 833275536

Links
- Journal homepage; Online access; Online archive

Studies in Educational Evaluation is a quarterly peer-reviewed academic journal covering evaluation research in the field of education. It was established in 1975 and is published by Elsevier. The editor-in-chief is P. Van Petegem (University of Antwerp). According to the Journal Citation Reports, the journal has a 2019 impact factor of 1.983.
