= Journal of Special Education and Rehabilitation =

The Journal of Special Education and Rehabilitation (print: ISSN 1409-6099, online: ISSN 1857-663X) is an open-access peer-reviewed academic journal which publishes papers in the field of education. The journal's editors are Vladimir Trajkovski from Ss. Cyril and Methodius University of Skopje and Olivera Rashikj-Canevska Ss. Cyril and Methodius University of Skopje. It has been in publication since 1997 and is currently published by Institute of Special Education and Rehabilitation of the Faculty of Philosophy in Skopje and Macedonian Association of Special Educators.

== Scope ==
Journal of Special Education and Rehabilitation (print: ISSN 1409-6099, online: ISSN 1857-663X) publishes research articles and scholarly reviews on special education and rehabilitation for individuals with from mild to severe disabilities. The following types of articles are considered for publication: original and review articles, short report, letters to the editor, clinical experiences, survey of cases, doctoral dissertations, master thesis, rapid communications, editorials from all the fields of special education, rehabilitation, medicine, psychology, pedagogy, and social sciences.

== Abstracting and indexing ==
The journal is abstracted and indexed in EBSCO databases, Hinari, ProQuest, Index Copernicus, Directory of Open Access Journals and Scopus.

== See also ==
- Open Access Scholarly Publishers Association, of which JSER is a member
