= Asian Journal of Legal Education =

- Discipline: Law
- Language: English
- Edited by: Manoj Kumar Sinha

Publication details
- History: Jan 2014
- Publisher: Sage Publications India Pvt. Ltd.
- Frequency: Bi-annually

Standard abbreviations
- ISO 4: Asian J. Leg. Educ.

Indexing
- ISSN: 2322-0058 (print); 2348-2451 (web)

The Asian Journal of Legal Education is a blind peer reviewed academic journal published twice a year by Sage in collaboration with the West Bengal National University of Juridical Sciences. It is edited by Manoj Kumar Sinha.

This journal is a member of the Committee on Publication Ethics (COPE).

== Abstracting and indexing ==
Asian Journal of Legal Education is abstracted and indexed in:

- J-Gate
- DeepDyve
- Dutch-KB
- EBSCO
- HeinOnline
- Indian Citation Index (ICI)
- OCLC
- Ohio
- Portico
- SCOPUS
- UGC-CARE (GROUP I)
