= Journal of Writing Research =

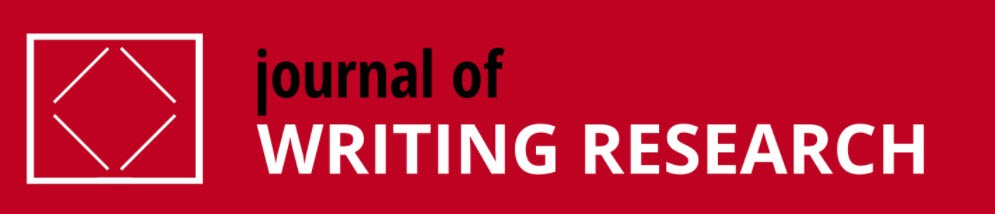
- Discipline: Writing research
- Language: English
- Edited by: Luuk Van Waes, Gert Rijlaarsdam, Mark Torrance, Charles MacArthur, Montserrat Castelló

Publication details
- Frequency: Triannual
- Open access: Yes
- License: CC BY-NC-ND

Standard abbreviations
- ISO 4: J. Writ. Res.

Indexing
- ISSN: 2030-1006 (print); 2294-3307 (web)

Links
- Journal homepage

The Journal of Writing Research is a triannual peer-reviewed open-access academic journal covering research on the processes by which writing is produced and can be effectively taught. It was established in 2008. The initiative to start this journal was taken by members of the European Association for Research on Learning and Instruction's special interest group on Writing. The journal is diamond open access, which means that there are no charges for either authors or readers and is published under Creative Commons Attribution-Non-commercial-No Derivative Works 3.0 Unported license. It is administrated by the University of Antwerp.

== Abstracting and indexing ==
The journal is abstracted and indexed by:

- Emerging Sources Citation Index
- ENSCO databases
- ERIH Plus
- Linguist list
- MLA International Bibliography
- Scopus

== John R. Hayes Award ==
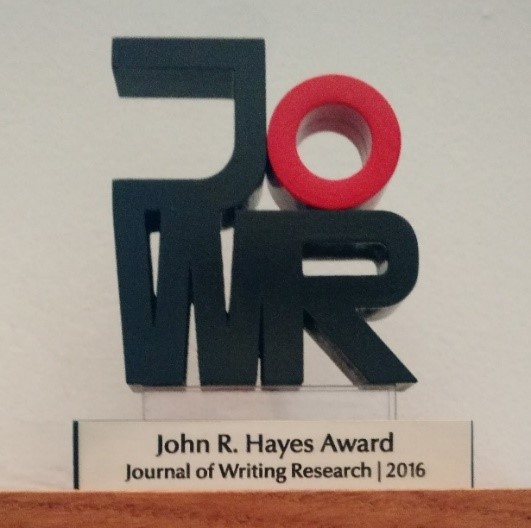
John Hayes award

Every two years, an article published in the journal receives the John R. Hayes Award in recognition of its outstanding empirical contribution to writing research. The award is funded by John R. Hayes (Carnegie Mellon University).

== Funding ==
The journal has received financial support from the European Association for Research on Learning and Instruction's special interest group on Writing community, the Belgian University Foundation, and the University of Antwerp.
