= Physical education =

Educational subject related to sport and exercise

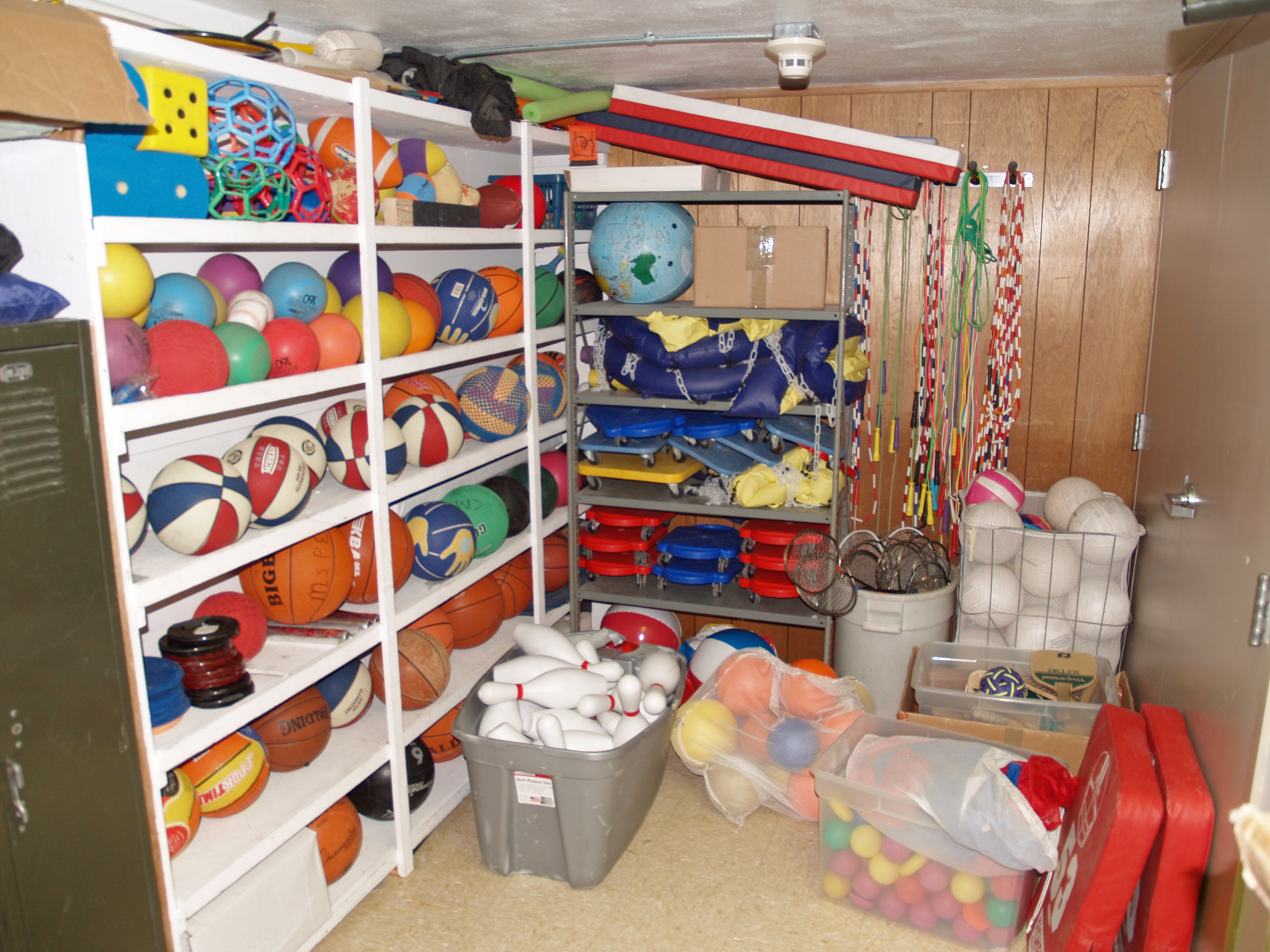
Physical education equipment in Calhan, Colorado

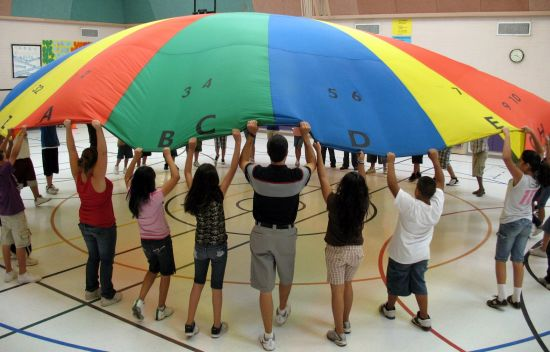
Children using a parachute during a physical education lesson

Physical education is an academic subject taught in schools worldwide, encompassing primary, secondary, and sometimes tertiary education. It is often referred to as Phys. Ed. or PE, and in the United States it is informally called gym class or gym. Physical education generally focuses on developing physical fitness, motor skills, health awareness, and social interaction through activities such as sports, exercise, and movement education. While curricula vary by country, PE generally aims to promote lifelong physical activity and well-being. Unlike other academic subjects, physical education is distinctive because it engages students across the psychomotor, cognitive, affective, social, and cultural domains of learning. Physical education content differs internationally, as physical activities often reflect the geographic, cultural, and environmental features of each region. While the purpose of physical education is debated, one of its central goals is generally regarded as socializing and empowering young people to value and participate in diverse movement and physical activity cultures.

== Five Learning Bodies in PE (Core Learning Domains) ==
Historically, the field of physical education has focused on three learning domains: affective, cognitive, and psychomotor. More recently, however, scholarship in physical education has recently acknowledged two additional, social and cultural domains of learning. Recently, physical education researchers from Australia, Sweden and the United Kingdom have re-formulated the Domains of Learning to be understood as Five Learning Bodies in physical education: Moving Body, Thinking Body, Emotional Body, Social Body, and Cultural Body. This re-formulation was done using the academic literature in physical education and education more broadly.

- Moving Body: This dimension emphasizes the development of physical competencies and motor skills. It encompasses students' abilities to perform various movements with control, coordination, and efficiency, forming the foundation of traditional PE activities.
- Thinking Body: Beyond physical movement, this aspect focuses on cognitive engagement. It involves understanding rules, strategies, and concepts related to physical activities, fostering critical thinking, decision-making, and reflective practices among students.
- Social Body: This facet highlights the importance of social interactions and relationships in PE settings. It considers how students collaborate, communicate, and build relationships through physical activities, promoting teamwork, empathy, and a sense of community.
- Emotional Body: Recognizing the emotional experiences associated with physical activity, this dimension addresses feelings such as joy, frustration, confidence, and anxiety. It underscores the role of emotions in motivation, engagement, and overall well-being in PE.
- Cultural Body: This component acknowledges the cultural contexts and identities that students bring into PE. It involves understanding how cultural backgrounds, values, and societal norms influence students' participation and experiences in physical activities.

By integrating these five learning bodies, teachers can offer a comprehensive approach to PE that transcends the traditional focus on physical activity alone. This framework encourages educators to consider the multifaceted nature of student development, promoting inclusive and meaningful learning experiences in physical education.

== Curriculum approaches to physical education ==
Like education more broadly, there are different curriculum approaches to physical education. Ennis has identified that there are three main approaches to curriculum in physical education: Factory, Garden and Journey.

- Factory Model: The Factory model treats education like an assembly line, where students are expected to master specific skills through standardized instruction and assessment. In physical education, this might look like a unit on basketball where all students learn the same set of drills (e.g., dribbling, shooting, passing) and are assessed with performance rubrics or timed tasks. The teacher leads the class with a focus on efficiency, discipline, and outcome-based results. While this ensures consistency, it can ignore diverse learning needs or interests.
  - Example: A teacher sets up skill stations and times students on lay-up drills, awarding scores based on speed and accuracy.
- Garden Model: The Garden model sees students as individuals with unique potential that needs nurturing. Physical education under this model emphasizes emotional wellbeing, inclusivity, and student choice. A teacher may design activities that allow for various levels of participation and success, such as yoga, dance, or cooperative games, ensuring every student feels safe and supported. The emphasis is on enjoyment, personal growth, and developing a positive relationship with movement.
  - Example: During a fitness unit, students set their own personal health goals (e.g., improving flexibility, managing stress) and reflect weekly on their progress with teacher feedback.
- Journey Model: The Journey model frames PE as a process of exploration, where learning unfolds over time and is guided by curiosity and reflection. The teacher and students co-create experiences that are meaningful and relevant. In this model, a teacher might facilitate a project where students design their own games, explore cultural sports, or investigate how physical activity affects mental health. The emphasis is on personal meaning, collaboration, and making connections beyond the classroom.
  - Example: Students work in groups to research traditional Indigenous games, learn the rules, and then teach them to their peers while discussing the cultural significance of each activity.

These curricular approaches are never fully adopted by a school or teacher. Rather, it is likely that schools are using a combination of these approaches in order to address the learning needs of students. Further, each approach is necessary at a different time. That said, skill mastery is often located at the factory end of this continuum whereas critical thinking skills are often part of the journey end of the continuum.

One particular approach to physical education that is not captured in the above three models is a critical approach to curriculum. A critical approach is often linked to addressing the social and cultural dimensions of physical education. As such, part of this instruction includes teaching about the role of inequity in health, movement and the body.

- Critical Approach: Critical curriculum approaches in physical education aims to transform the subject from a site of physical performance and reproduction of norms into a space for critical thinking and social change. Rather than simply delivering content or developing physical skills, a critical curriculum invites students and teachers to question whose bodies, knowledges and experiences are valued in PE, and to work toward creating more empowering learning environments.
  - Example: The students might reflect on gameplay and discuss how current rules of a game limit participation, teamwork and fairness. They would then revise the rules collaboratively to improve these elements for the next game.

== Pedagogy ==
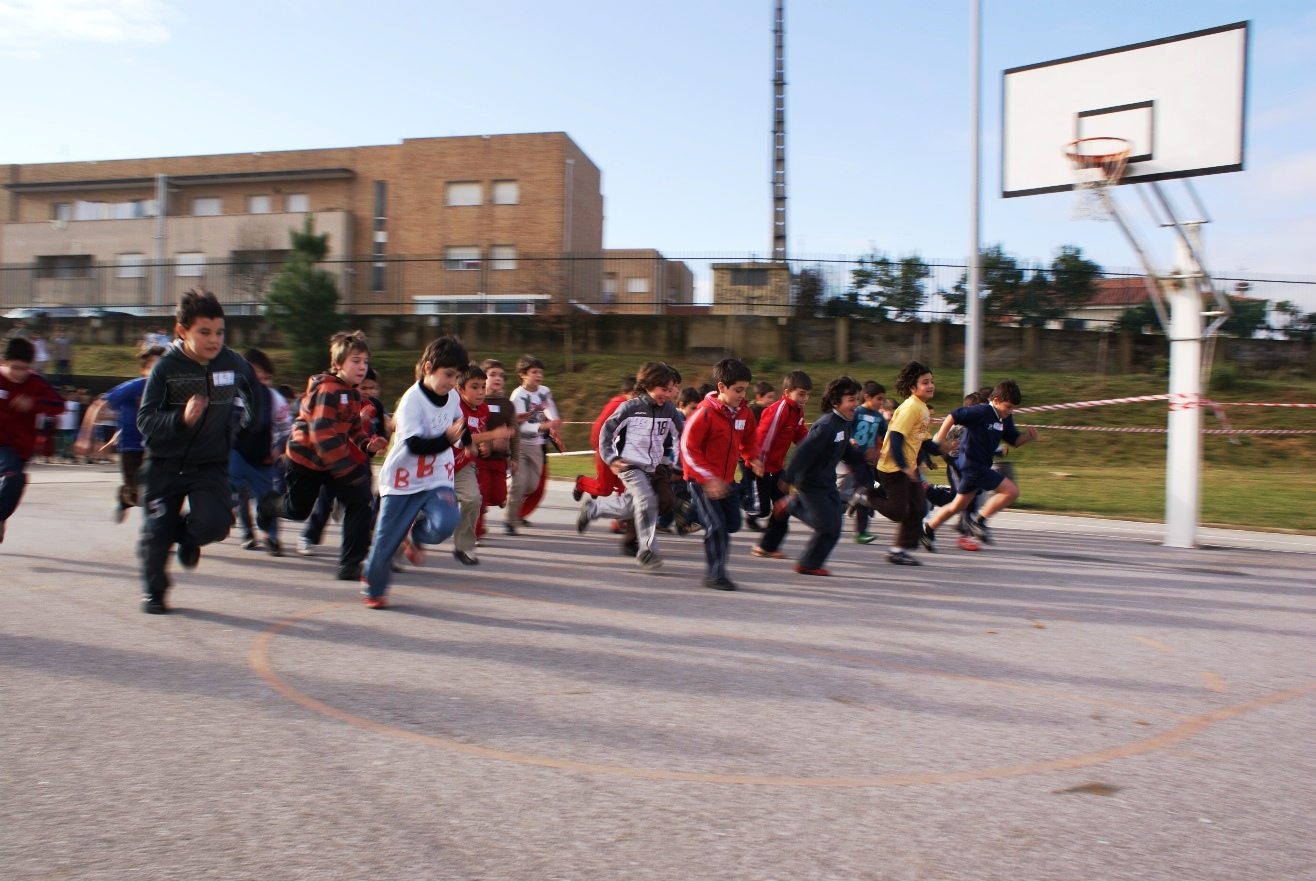
Young Portuguese children participating in a school race

The main goals in teaching modern physical education are:

- To expose children and teens to a wide variety of exercise and healthy activities. Because physical education can be accessible to nearly all children, it is one of the only opportunities that can guarantee beneficial and healthy activity in children.
- To teach skills to maintain a lifetime of fitness as well as health.
- To encourage self-reporting and monitoring of exercise.
- To individualize duration, intensity, and type of activity.
- To focus feedback on the work, rather than the result.
- To provide active role models.

It is critical for physical educators to foster and strengthen developing motor skills and to provide children and teens with a basic skill set that builds their movement repertoire, which allows students to engage in various forms of games, sports, and other physical activities throughout their lifetime.

These goals can be achieved in a variety of ways. National, state, and local guidelines often dictate which standards must be taught in regards to physical education. These standards determine what content is covered, the qualifications educators must meet, and the textbooks and materials which must be used. These various standards include teaching sports education, or the use of sports as exercise; fitness education, relating to overall health and fitness; and movement education, which deals with movement in a non-sport context.

These approaches and curricula are based on pioneers in PE, namely, Francois Delsarte, Liselott Diem, and Rudolf von Laban, who, in the 1800s focused on using a child's ability to use their body for self-expression. This, in combination with approaches in the 1960s, (which featured the use of the body, spatial awareness, effort, and relationships) gave birth to the modern teaching of physical education.

Recent research has also explored the role of physical education for moral development in support of social inclusion and social justice agendas, where it is under-researched, especially in the context of disability, and the social inclusion of disabled people.

=== Technology use in physical education ===
Many physical education classes utilize technology to assist their pupils in effective exercise. One of the most affordable and popular tools is a simple video recorder. With this, students record themselves, and, upon playback, can see mistakes they are making in activities like throwing or swinging. Studies show that students find this more effective than having someone try to explain what they are doing wrong, and then trying to correct it.

Educators may also use technology such as pedometers and heart rate monitors to make step and heart rate goals for students. Implementing pedometers in physical education can improve physical activity participation, motivation and enjoyment.

Other technologies that can be used in a physical education setting include video projectors and GPS systems. Gaming systems and their associated games, such as the Kinect, Wii, and Wii Fit can also be used. Projectors are used to show students proper form or how to play certain games. GPS systems can be used to get students active in an outdoor setting, and active exergames, such as dance or sports simulation games that require physical movement, can be used by teachers to show students a good way to stay fit in and out of a classroom setting. Exergames, or digital games that require the use of physical movement to participate, can be used as a tool to encourage physical activity and health in young children.

Technology integration can increase student motivation and engagement in the Physical Education setting. However, the ability of educators to effectively use technology in the classroom is reliant on a teacher's perceived competence in their ability to integrate technology into the curriculum.

Beyond traditional tools, recent AI advancements are introducing new methods for personalizing physical education, especially for adolescents. AI applications like adaptive coaching are starting to show promise in enhancing student motivation and program effectiveness in physical education settings.

== International Charter of Physical Education ==
According to the International Charter of Physical Education establishes that access to physical education, physical activity, and sports is a fundamental human right for all people without discrimination. The charter highlights their benefits for well-being, social inclusion, respect for human dignity, and emphasizes the need for inclusive access and training for all involved in physical education.

== By location ==
According to the World Health Organization (WHO), it is suggested that young children should be participating in 60-minutes of exercise per day at least 3 times per week in order to maintain a healthy body. This 60-minute recommendation can be achieved by completing different forms of physical activity, including participation in physical education programs at school. A majority of children around the world participate in Physical Education programs in general education settings. According to data collected from a worldwide survey, 79% of countries require legal implementation of PE in school programming. Physical education programming can vary all over the world.

=== Asia ===
==== Philippines ====
In the Philippines, physical education is mandatory for all years in school, unless the school gives the option for a student to do the Leaving Certificate Vocational Programme instead for their fifth and sixth year. Some schools have integrated martial arts training into their physical education curriculum.

==== Singapore ====
A Biennial compulsory fitness exam, NAPFA, is conducted in every school to assess pupils' physical fitness in Singapore. This includes a series of fitness tests. Students are graded by a system of gold, silver, bronze, or as a fail. NAPFA for pre-enlistees serves as an indicator for an additional two months in the country's compulsory national service training if they attain bronze or fail.

=== Europe ===
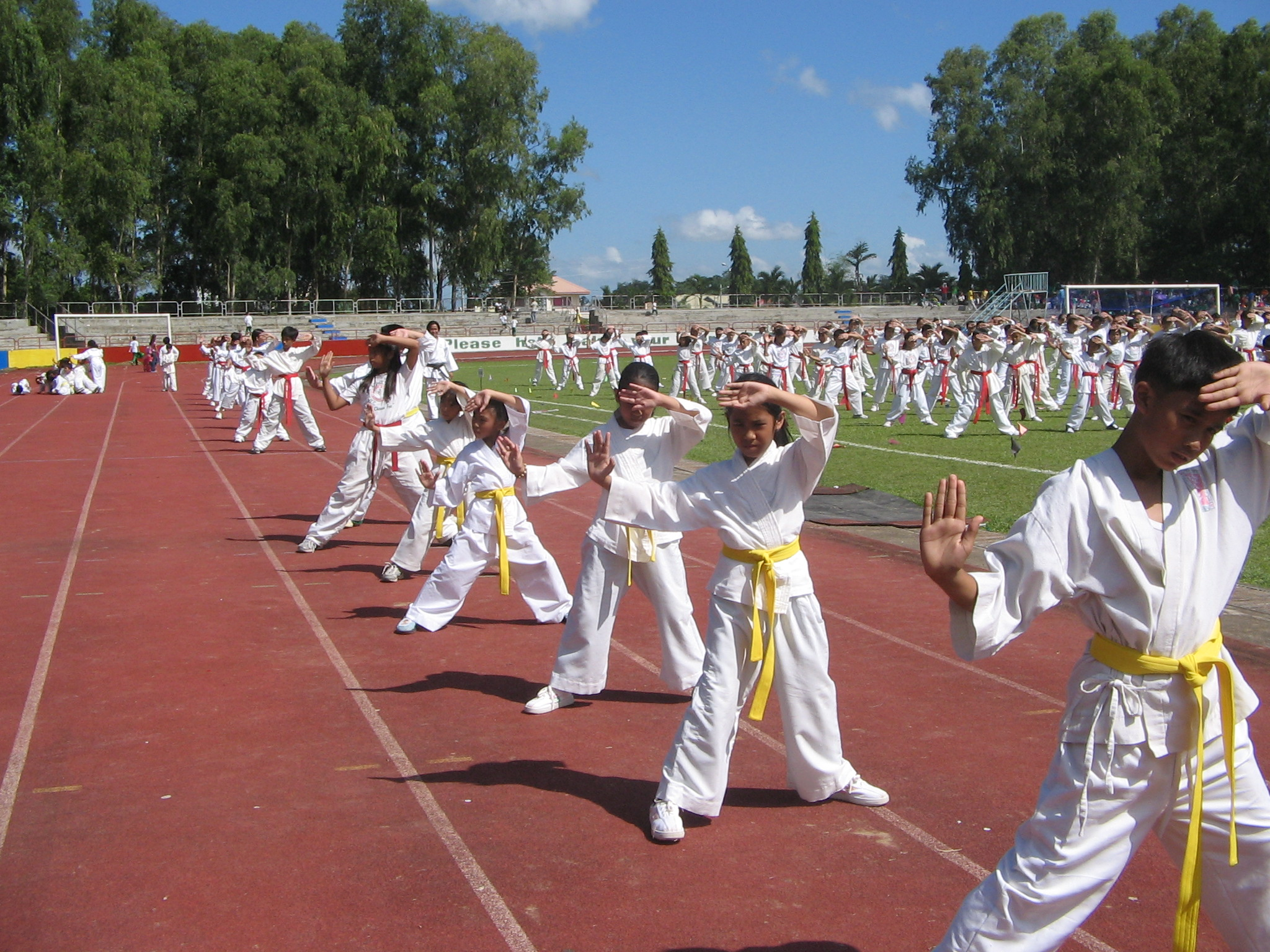
Some countries include martial arts training in school as part of physical education class. These Filipino children are practicing karate.

==== Ireland ====
In Ireland, one is expected to do two semesters worth of 80-minute PE classes. This also includes showering and changing times. So, on average, classes are composed of 60–65 minutes of activity.

==== Poland ====
In Poland, pupils are expected to do at least three hours of PE a week during primary and secondary education. Universities must also organize at least 60 hours of physical education classes in undergraduate courses.

==== Sweden ====
In Sweden, the time school students spend in physical education lessons per week varies between municipalities, but generally, years 0 to 2 have 55 minutes of PE a week; years 3 to 6 have 110 minutes a week, and years 7 to 9 have 220 minutes. In upper secondary school, all national programs have an obligatory course, containing 100 points of PE, which corresponds to 90–100 hours of PE during the course (one point per hour). Schools can regulate these hours as they like during the three years of school students attend. Most schools have students take part in this course during the first year and offer a follow-up course, which also contains 100 points/hours.

==== United Kingdom ====
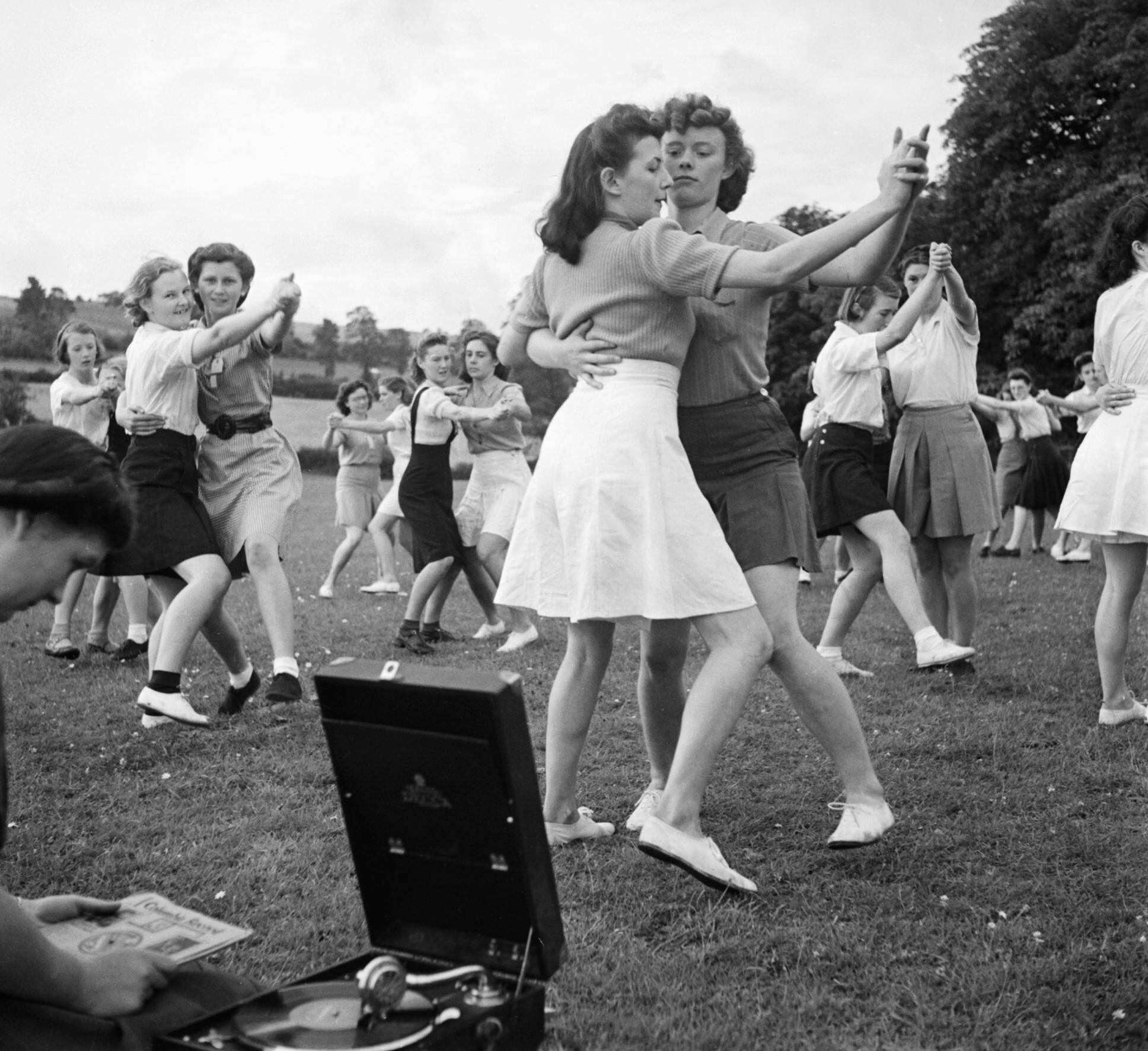
Students dancing in pairs (holding each other ballroom style), learning European folk dance as part of their physical education class, Somerset, 1943

In England, pupils in years 7, 8, and 9 are expected to do two hours of exercise per week. Pupils in years 10 and 11 are expected to do one hour of exercise per week.

In Wales, pupils are expected to do two hours of PE a week.

In Scotland, Scottish pupils are expected to have at least two hours of PE per week during primary and lower secondary education.

In Northern Ireland, pupils are expected to participate in at least two hours of physical education (PE) per week during years 8 and 9. PE remains part of the curriculum for years 10 to 12, though the time allocated may vary.

=== North America ===
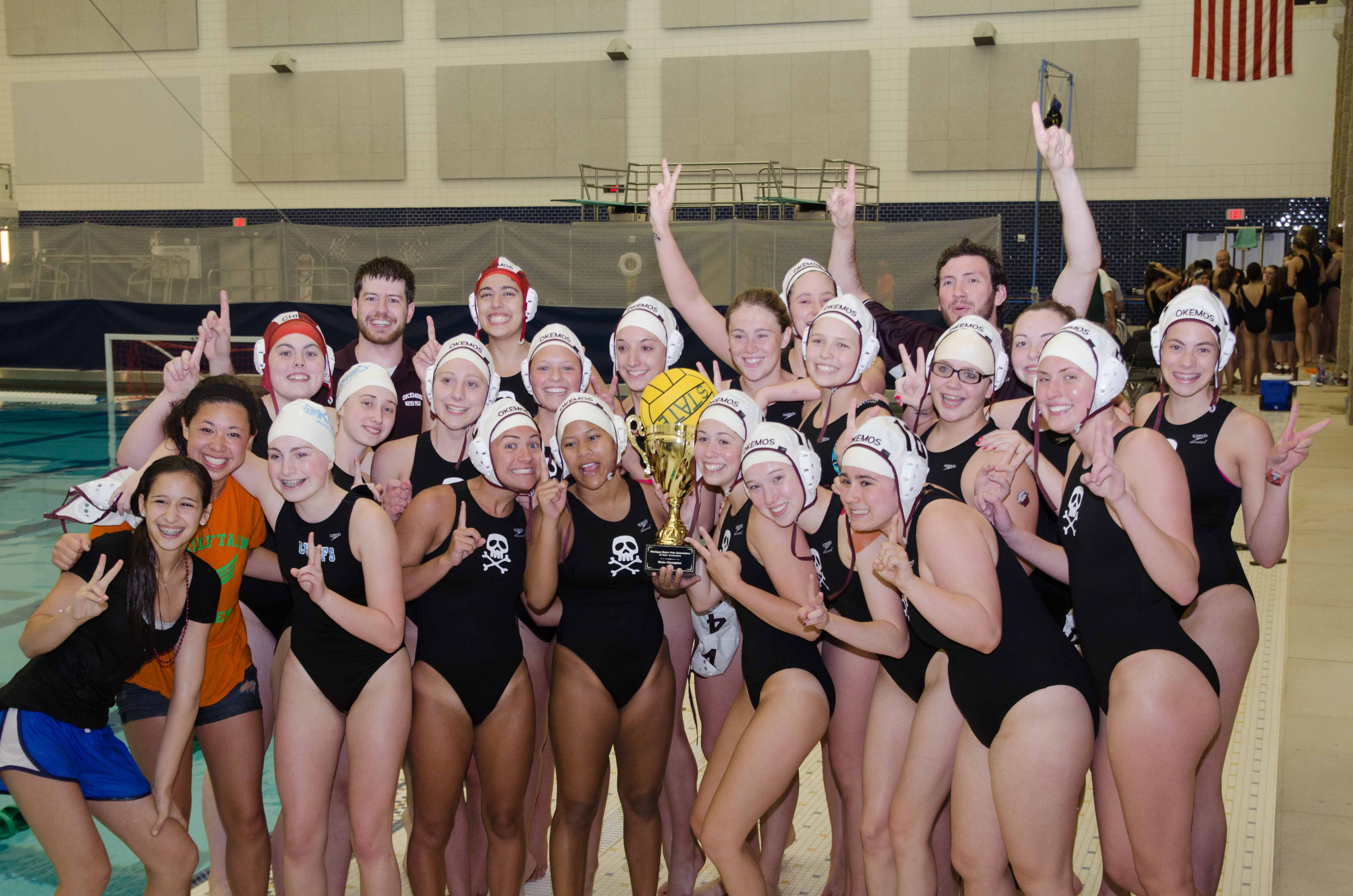
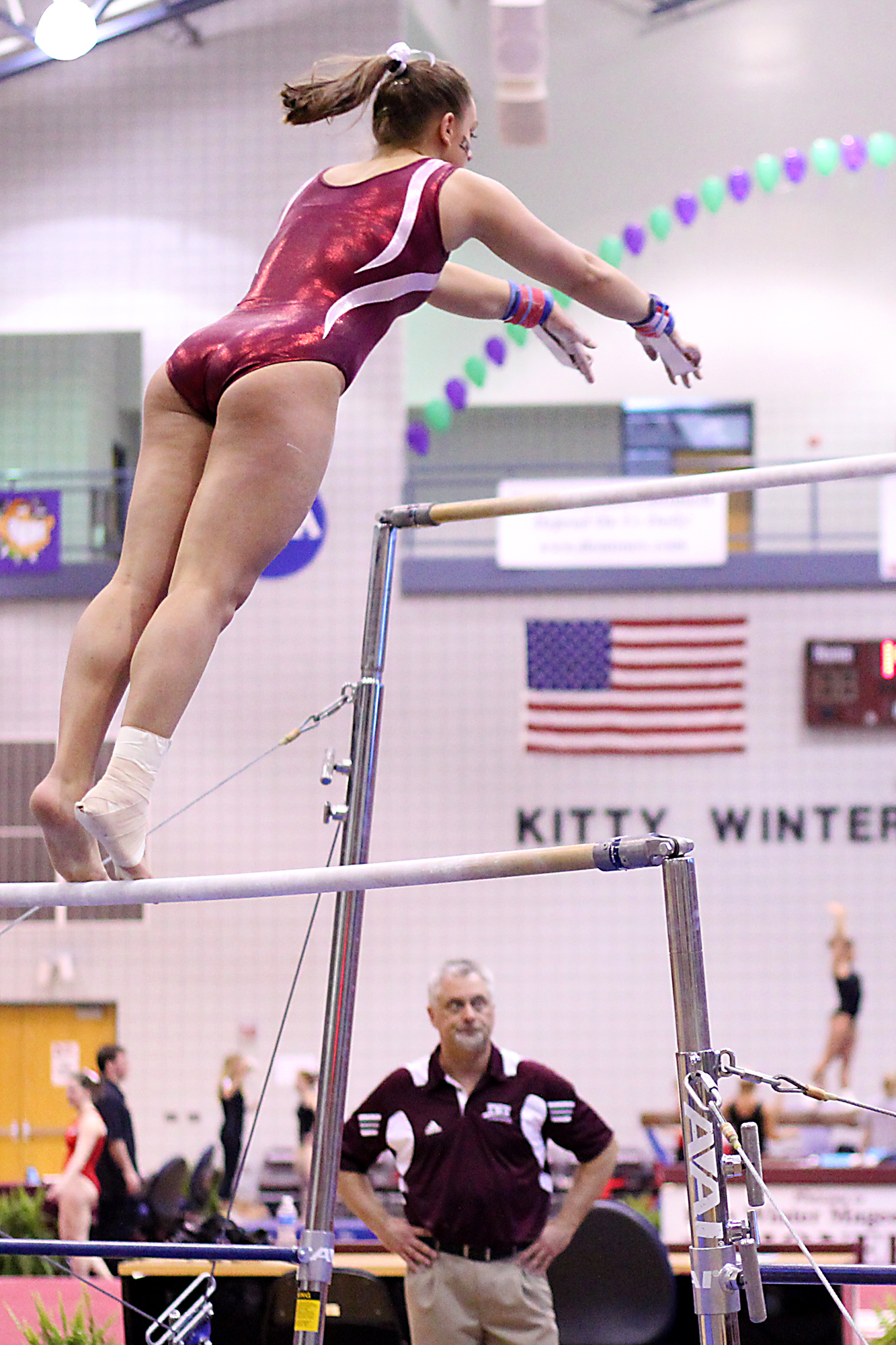
Left: A U.S. high school girls' water polo team (with their male coaches in background) posing with their trophy. Right: A U.S. university girl practising a difficult gymnastics maneuver.

==== Canada ====
In British Columbia, the government has mandated in the grade one curriculum that students must participate in physical activity daily five times a week. The educator is also responsible for planning Daily Physical Activity (DPA), which is thirty minutes of mild to moderate physical activity a day (not including curriculum physical education classes). The curriculum also requires students in grade one to be knowledgeable about healthy living. For example, they must be able to describe the benefits of regular exercise, identify healthy choices in activities, and describe the importance of choosing healthy food.

Ontario, Canada has a similar procedure in place. On October 6, 2005, the Ontario Ministry of Education (OME) implemented a DPA policy in elementary schools, for those in grades 1 through 8. The government also requires that all students in grades 1 through 8, including those with special needs, be provided with opportunities to participate in a minimum of twenty minutes of sustained, moderate to vigorous physical activity each school day during instructional time.

==== United States ====
The 2012 "Shape Of The Nation Report" by the National Association for Sport and Physical Education (part of SHAPE America) and the American Heart Association found that while nearly 75% of states require physical education in elementary through high school, over half of the states permit students to substitute other activities for their required physical education credit, or otherwise fail to mandate a specific amount of instructional time. According to the report, only six states (Illinois, Hawaii, Massachusetts, Mississippi, New York, and Vermont) require physical education at every grade level. A majority of states in 2016 did not require a specific amount of instructional time, and more than half allow exemptions or substitution. These loopholes can lead to reduced effectiveness of the physical education programs.

Zero Hour is a before-school physical education class first implemented by Naperville Central High School. In the state of Illinois, this program is known as Learning Readiness Physical Education. The program was based on research indicating that students who are physically fit are more academically alert, experience growth in brain cells, and enhancement in brain development. NCHS pairs a physical education class that incorporates cardiovascular exercise, core strength training, cross-lateral movements, as well as literacy and math strategies which enhance learning and improve achievement.

=== South America ===
==== Brazil ====
In Brazil, physical education is a compulsory curricular component of basic education under the national Education Guidelines and Framework Law (Lei de Diretrizes e Bases da Educação Nacional, LDB). The law defines physical education as integrated into each school's pedagogical proposal and adjusted to students' age groups and conditions. In the National Common Curricular Base (Base Nacional Comum Curricular, BNCC), the subject is framed around a broad notion of bodily practices, including games and play, sports, gymnastics, dances, martial arts and adventure body practices. Academic discussion of the BNCC has noted that this framework gives school physical education a broader cultural and educational scope, while also producing debates about curriculum standardisation, competencies and students' learning experiences.

== See also ==
- Physical culture
- Recreation
- Exercise
- Lack of physical education
- Sports day
- Worldwide Day of Play
- Journal of Physical Education (Maringá)
- List of education journals – Physical education
