= Power and Education =

- Discipline: Pedagogy, Education
- Language: English
- Edited by: Dean Garrett

Publication details
- History: 2009–present
- Publisher: SAGE Publishing (United Kingdom)
- Frequency: Triannually
- Open access: No
- License: CC BY (if applicable)

Standard abbreviations
- ISO 4: Power Educ.

Indexing
- ISSN: 1757-7438
- LCCN: 2016268509
- OCLC no.: 751438634

Links
- Journal homepage; Online access; Online archive

Power and Education is a triannual peer-reviewed academic journal that focuses on educational theory, policy, and practice. Established in 2009, it is published by SAGE Publishing. The current editor-in-chief is Dean Garrett of York St John University.

== Abstracting and indexing ==
The journal is abstracted and indexed in:\n

\n* Emerging Sources Citation Index\n* EBSCO databases\n* Education Resources Information Center\n* ProQuest databases\n* Scopus\n
