= Assessment for Effective Intervention =

- Discipline: Psychoeducational assessment
- Language: English
- Edited by: Aarti Bellara & Nathan Stevenson

Publication details
- Former name: Diagnostique
- History: 1979-present
- Publisher: SAGE Publications in association with the Hammill Institute on Disabilities (United States)
- Frequency: Quarterly
- Impact factor: 1.3 (2022)

Standard abbreviations
- ISO 4: Assess. Eff. Interv.

Indexing
- ISSN: 1534-5084 (print); 1938-7458 (web)
- LCCN: 2001214194
- OCLC no.: 86222304

Links
- Journal homepage; Online access; Online archive

Assessment for Effective Intervention is a quarterly peer-reviewed academic journal that covers psychoeducational assessment. Assessment for Effective Intervention is edited by Aarti Bellara (Western Carolina University) and Nathan Stevenson (Kent State University). It was established in 1979 and is published by SAGE Publications in association with the Hammill Institute on Disabilities.

== Abstracting and indexing ==
The journal is abstracted and indexed in:

- Contents Pages in Education
- Educational Research Abstracts Online
- Linguistics and Language Behavior Abstracts
- PsycINFO
- SafetyLit
- Scopus
