= College Quarterly =

- Discipline: Education
- Language: English

Publication details
- History: 1993-present
- Publisher: Seneca College (Canada)
- Frequency: Quarterly

Standard abbreviations
- ISO 4: Coll. Q.

Indexing
- ISSN: 1195-4353

Links
- Journal homepage

The College Quarterly is a peer-reviewed academic journal established in 1993 and published by Seneca College in Toronto, Ontario. The journal publishes scholarly articles and book reviews from a wide variety of academic fields related to teaching and learning and higher education policy issues in North America.
