= Journal of Early Childhood Literacy =

- Discipline: Literacy
- Language: English
- Edited by: Jackie Marsh, Guy Merchant, Julia Gillen, Deborah Wells Rowe, Pauline Harris

Publication details
- History: 2001-present
- Publisher: SAGE Publications
- Frequency: Quarterly

Standard abbreviations
- ISO 4: J. Early Child. Lit.

Indexing
- ISSN: 1468-7984 (print); 1741-2919 (web)
- LCCN: 2002201200
- OCLC no.: 66782838

Links
- Journal homepage; Online access; Online archive

The Journal of Early Childhood Literacy is a quarterly peer-reviewed academic journal that covers research in the field of child literacy, including the history, development and teaching of literacy. The journal's editors-in-chief are Jackie Marsh (University of Sheffield), Guy Merchant (Sheffield Hallam University), Julia Gillen (University of Lancaster), Pauline Harris, (University of South Australia) and Deborah Wells Rowe (Vanderbilt University). It was established in 2001 and is currently published by SAGE Publications.

== Abstracting and indexing ==
The journal is abstracted and indexed in:

- Academic Premier
- British Education Index
- Educational Research Abstracts Online
- Family Index Database
- Studies on Women & Gender Abstracts
- Scopus
