= Educational and Psychological Measurement =

- Discipline: Educational psychology
- Language: English
- Edited by: George A. Marcoulides

Publication details
- History: 1941-present
- Publisher: SAGE Publications
- Frequency: Bimonthly
- Impact factor: 1.663 (2017)

Standard abbreviations
- ISO 4: Educ. Psychol. Meas.

Indexing
- CODEN: EPMEAJ
- ISSN: 0013-1644 (print); 1552-3888 (web)
- LCCN: 43015039
- OCLC no.: 1567567

Links
- Journal homepage; Online access; Online archive

Educational and Psychological Measurement is a bimonthly peer-reviewed academic journal that covers the field of educational psychology. The journal's editor-in-chief is George A. Marcoulides (University of California, Santa Barbara). It was established in 1941 and is published by SAGE Publications.

== Abstracting and indexing ==
The journal is abstracted and indexed in Scopus and the Social Sciences Citation Index. According to the Journal Citation Reports, its 2017 impact factor is 1.663, ranking it 7th out of 13 journals in the category "Psychology, Mathematical", 25th out of 59 journals in the category "Psychology, Educational", and 37th out of 103 journals in "Mathematics, Interdisciplinary Applications".
