= Higher Education for the Future =

- Discipline: Education
- Language: English
- Edited by: Rajan Gurukal

Publication details
- History: Jan 2014
- Publisher: Sage Publications India Pvt. Ltd.
- Frequency: bi-annually

Standard abbreviations
- ISO 4: High. Educ. Future

Indexing
- ISSN: 2347-6311 (print); 2348-5779 (web)

Links
- Journal homepage; Online access; Online archive

Higher Education for the Future is a peer-reviewed multi-disciplinary journal that focuses on higher education.

The journal is published twice a year by Sage, in association with the Kerala State Higher Education Council. It is a member of the Committee on Publication Ethics (COPE).

It is edited by Rajan Gurukal.

== Indexing and Abstracting ==
Higher Education for the Future is abstracted and indexed in:

- DeepDyve
- Dutch-KB
- ERIC (Education Resources Information Center)
- Indian Citation Index (ICI)
- J-Gate
- OCLC
- Ohio
- ProQuest
- SCOPUS
- UGC-CARE (GROUP II)
