= Update: Applications of Research in Music Education =

UPDATE: Applications of Research in Music Education
- Discipline: Music education
- Language: English
- Edited by: Debbie Rohwer

Publication details
- History: 1982–present
- Publisher: SAGE Publications
- Frequency: Biannually

Standard abbreviations
- ISO 4: Update Appl. Res. Music Educ.

Indexing
- ISSN: 8755-1233
- LCCN: 87642727
- OCLC no.: 474580669

Links
- Journal homepage; Online access; Online archive

UPDATE: Applications of Research in Music Education is a biannual peer-reviewed academic journal that covers the field of music education. The editor-in-chief is Debbie Rohwer. It was established in 1982 by Dr. Charles Elliot and is published by SAGE Publications in association with the National Association for Music Education.

== Abstracting and indexing ==
The journal is abstracted and indexed in:

- Academic Search Premier
- Educator's Reference Complete
- ERIC - Education Resources Information Center
- MLA International Bibliography
- The Music Index
- Wilson Education Index
