= Active Learning in Higher Education =

- Language: English
- Edited by: Lynne P Baldwin

Publication details
- History: 2000-present
- Publisher: SAGE Publications
- Frequency: Tri-annually
- Impact factor: (2010)

Standard abbreviations
- ISO 4: Act. Learn. High. Educ.

Indexing
- ISSN: 1469-7874
- LCCN: 2001207073
- OCLC no.: 472999071

Links
- Journal homepage; Online access; Online archive

Active Learning in Higher Education is a peer-reviewed academic journal that publishes papers three times a year in the field of Education. The journal's editor is Virginia Clinton-Lisell (University of North Dakota). It has been in publication since 2000 and is currently published by SAGE Publications in association with Institute for Learning and Teaching in Higher Education. Its 2-year impact factor is 4.765.

== Scope ==
Active Learning in Higher Education is aimed at all those who teach and support learning in higher education and those who undertake or use research into effective learning, teaching and assessment in universities and colleges. The journal aims to focus on all aspects of development, innovations and good practice in higher education teaching and learning, including the use of information and communication technologies and issues concerning the management of teaching and learning.

== Abstracting and indexing ==
Active Learning in Higher Education is abstracted and indexed in the following databases:

- Academic Premier
- Current Contents: Social and Behavioral Sciences
- Educational Administration Abstracts
- Educational Research Abstracts Online
- SCOPUS
- Social Sciences Citation Index
