= Journal of Music Teacher Education =

- Discipline: Music education
- Language: English
- Edited by: James Austin

Publication details
- History: 1991-present
- Publisher: SAGE Publications
- Frequency: Biannually

Standard abbreviations
- ISO 4: J. Music Teach. Educ.

Indexing
- ISSN: 1057-0837
- LCCN: 92642281
- OCLC no.: 52428334

Links
- Journal homepage; Online access; Online archive

The Journal of Music Teacher Education is a peer-reviewed academic journal covering the field of music education. The journal's editor-in-chief is James Austin (University of Colorado Boulder). It was established in 1991 and is currently published by SAGE Publications in association with the National Association for Music Education.

== Abstracting and indexing ==
The Journal of Music Teacher Education is abstracted and indexed in:

- Academic OneFile
- Current Abstracts
- Education Research Complete
- Expanded Academic ASAP
- TOC Premier
- Wilson Education Index
