= Teachers and Teaching =

- Discipline: Educational research
- Language: English
- Edited by: Christopher Day

Publication details
- History: 1995–present
- Publisher: Taylor & Francis
- Frequency: 8/year
- Impact factor: 2.378 (2017)

Standard abbreviations
- ISO 4: Teach. Teach.

Indexing
- ISSN: 1354-0602 (print); 1470-1278 (web)
- LCCN: 2004263044
- OCLC no.: 456510334

Links
- Journal homepage; Online access; Online archive

Teachers and Teaching: Theory and Practice is a peer-reviewed academic journal that publishes research on teaching. It was established in 1995 and is published eight times per year by Taylor & Francis. The editor-in-chief is Christopher Day (University of Nottingham). According to the Journal Citation Reports, the journal has a 2017 impact factor of 2.378, ranking it 36th out of 238 journals in the category "Education & Educational Research".
