= American Journal of Distance Education =

- Discipline: Distance education
- Language: English

Publication details
- History: 1987–present
- Publisher: Routledge
- Frequency: Quarterly

Standard abbreviations
- ISO 4: Am. J. Distance Educ.

Indexing
- ISSN: 0892-3647 (print); 1538-9286 (web)

Links
- Journal homepage; Online access

American Journal of Distance Education (AJDE) is an academic journal focusing on the uses of Internet in distance education (e-learning, distributed learning, asynchronous learning and blended learning) in Americas.

According to the journal website, it contents include:

- "building and sustaining effective delivery systems;
- course design and application of instructional design theories
- facilitating interaction between students and with instructors;
- factors influencing student achievement and satisfaction;
- the changing roles of faculty and changes in institutional culture;
- administrative and policy issues including cost-effectiveness and copyright."

The audience of AJDE includes: "teachers in primary education, secondary education and higher education, trainers in corporate, military, and professional fields; adult educators; researchers; and other specialists in education, training, and communications."

== Publication information ==
- From 1987 until 2001 AJDE was published at the Pennsylvania State University and is now published by Routledge
