= Mathematics Education Research Journal =

- Discipline: Mathematics education
- Language: English
- Edited by: Vince Geiger

Publication details
- History: 1989-present
- Publisher: Springer Science+Business Media on behalf of the Mathematics Education Research Group of Australasia
- Frequency: Quarterly
- Open access: Hybrid

Standard abbreviations
- ISO 4: Math. Educ. Res. J.

Indexing
- ISSN: 1033-2170 (print); 2211-050X (web)
- LCCN: 2018204247
- OCLC no.: 643972185

Links
- Journal homepage; Online archive; Journal page at society website

Mathematics Education Research Journal is a quarterly peer-reviewed scientific journal covering mathematics education. It was established in 1989 and is published by Springer Science+Business Media on behalf of the Mathematics Education Research Group of Australasia. The editor-in-chief is Peter Grootenboer (Griffith University).

== Abstracting and indexing ==
The journal is abstracted and indexed in the Astrophysics Data System, EBSCO databases, Emerging Sources Citation Index, ERIC, ProQuest databases, and Scopus.

== See also ==
- List of scientific journals in mathematics education
