= Journal of Educational Administration and History =

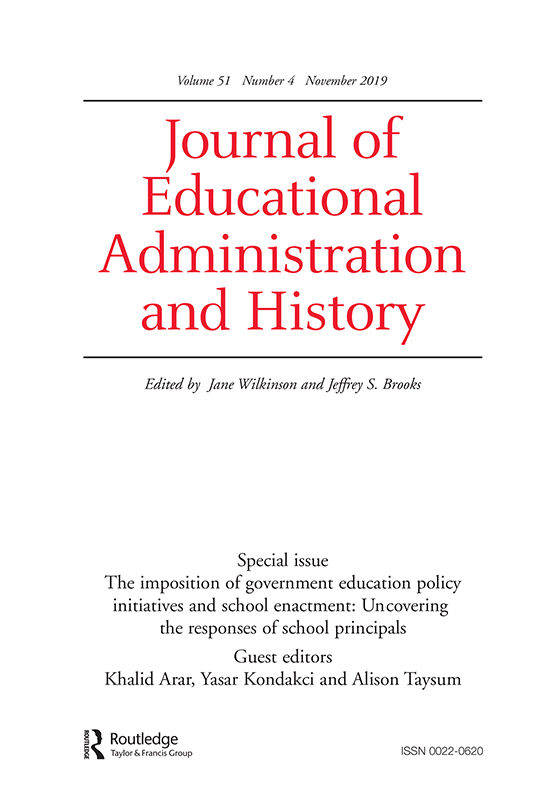
- Discipline: Education
- Language: English

Publication details
- Publisher: Routledge

Standard abbreviations
- ISO 4: J. Educ. Adm. Hist.

Indexing
- ISSN: 0022-0620 (print); 1478-7431 (web)

Links
- Journal homepage

The Journal of Educational Administration and History is a peer-reviewed academic journal of educational administration. It is published by Routledge and indexed in Scopus.
