= Remedial and Special Education =

- Discipline: Special education
- Language: English
- Edited by: Kathleen Lane, Karrie Shogren

Publication details
- Former names: Journal for Special Educators, Exceptional Education Quarterly, Topics in Learning & Learning Disabilities
- History: 1978-present
- Publisher: SAGE Publications
- Frequency: Bimonthly
- Impact factor: 5.258 (2021)

Standard abbreviations
- ISO 4: Remedial Spec. Educ.

Indexing
- ISSN: 0741-9325 (print); 1538-4756 (web)
- LCCN: 84645456
- OCLC no.: 645278633

Links
- Journal homepage; Online access; Online archive

Remedial and Special Education is a peer-reviewed academic journal that covers research in the field of special education. The editors-in-chief are Kathleen Lane and Karrie Shogren (University of Kansas). It was established in 1984 and is currently published by SAGE Publications in association with the Hammill Institute on Disabilities.

== Abstracting and indexing ==
Remedial and Special Education is abstracted and indexed in, among other databases, Scopus and the Social Sciences Citation Index. According to the Journal Citation Reports, its 2021 impact factor is 5.258, ranking it 1st out of 44 journals in the category "Education, Special".
