= Health Education Journal =

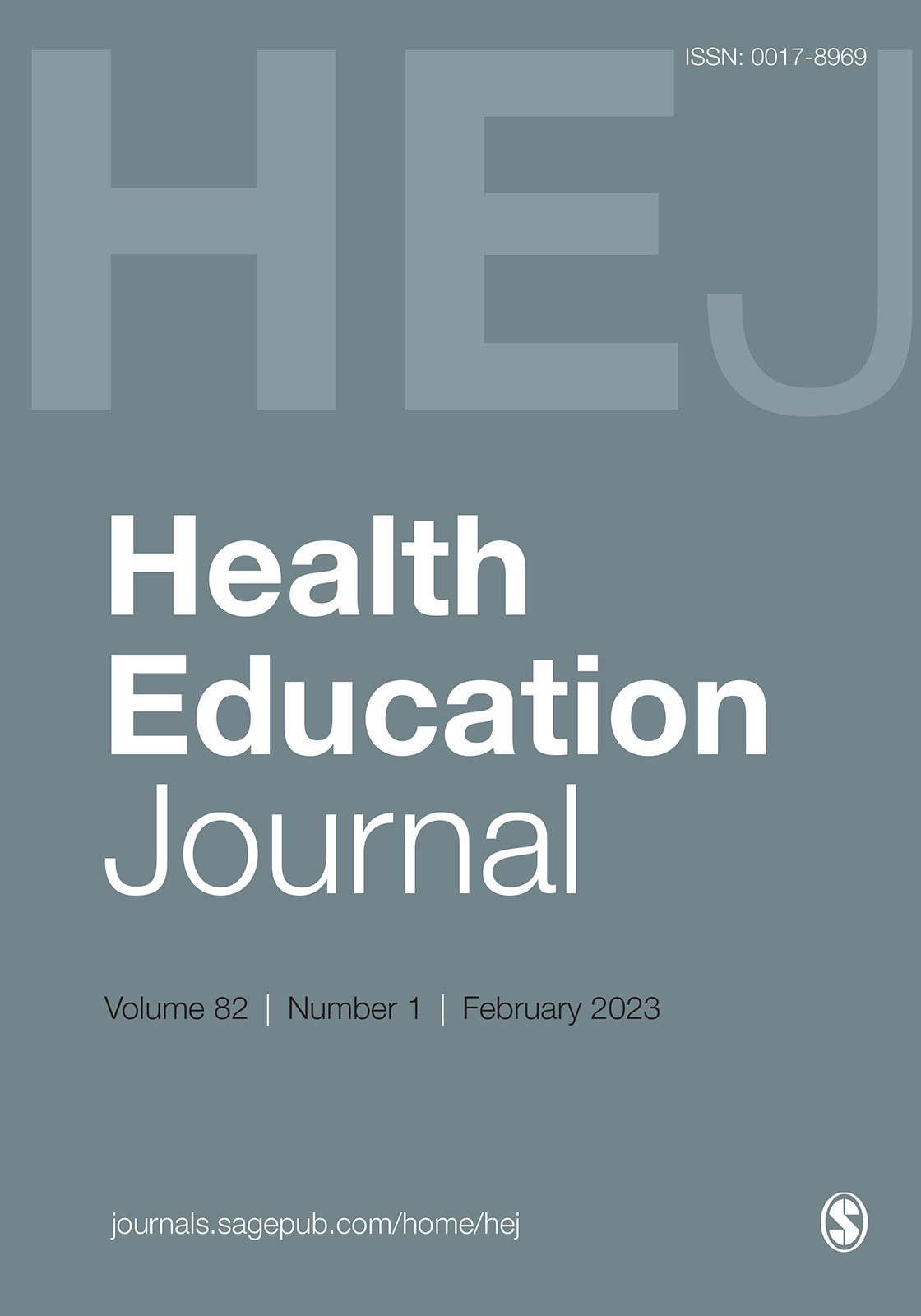
- Discipline: Health education
- Language: English
- Edited by: Peter Aggleton

Publication details
- Former names: Health and Empire
- History: 1943-present
- Publisher: SAGE Publications
- Frequency: 8/year
- Impact factor: 1.008 (2017)

Standard abbreviations
- ISO 4: Health Educ. J.

Indexing
- ISSN: 0017-8969 (print); 1748-8176 (web)
- LCCN: 49052191
- OCLC no.: 300300198

Links
- Journal homepage; Online access; Online archive

The Health Education Journal is a peer-reviewed academic journal that covers the field of health education. It was established in 1943 and is published by SAGE Publications The editor-in-chief is Peter Aggleton (University of New South Wales).

== Abstracting and indexing ==
The journal is abstracted and indexed in:

- CINAHL
- Current Contents/Social and Behavioral Sciences
- Embase/Excerpta Medica
- International Bibliography of the Social Sciences
- ProQuest databases
- Scopus
- Social Sciences Citation Index

According to the Journal Citation Reports, the journal's 2017 impact factor was 1.008, ranking it 125th out of 156 journals in the category "Public, Environmental & Occupational Health" and 165 out of 238 journals in the category "Education & Educational Research".
