= Journal of Positive Behavior Interventions =

Journal of Positive Behavioral Interventions
- Discipline: Education
- Language: English
- Edited by: Lee Kern, Kathleen Lane

Publication details
- History: 1999-present
- Publisher: SAGE Publications (United States)
- Frequency: Quarterly
- Impact factor: 2.41 (2017)

Standard abbreviations
- ISO 4: J. Posit. Behav. Interv.

Indexing
- ISSN: 1098-3007 (print); 1538-4772 (web)
- LCCN: 99113390
- OCLC no.: 38562547

Links
- Journal homepage; Online access; Online archive

Journal of Positive Behavior Interventions is a peer-reviewed academic journal that publishes papers in the field of Education. The journal's editors are Lee Kern (Lehigh University) and Kathleen Lane (University of Kansas). It has been in publication since 1999 and is currently published by SAGE Publications in association with The Hammill Institute on Disabilities.

== Scope ==
Journal of Positive Behavioral Interventions focuses on research-based principles of positive behavior support for use in school, home and community settings for people with challenges in behavioral adaptation. The journal publishes articles of empirical research, discussion and literature reviews and also provides a forum for the debate and discussion of research and findings.

== Abstracting and indexing ==
Journal of Positive Behavioral Interventions is abstracted and indexed in, among other databases: SCOPUS, PsycINFO, and the Social Sciences Citation Index. According to the Journal Citation Reports, its 2017impact factor is 2.41, ranking it 2 out of 40 journals in the category ‘Education, Special’ and 45 out of 127 journals in the category ‘Psychology, Clinical’.
