= Teacher Education and Special Education =

- Discipline: Special education
- Language: English
- Edited by: Laurie deBettencourt

Publication details
- History: 1977-present
- Publisher: SAGE Publications
- Frequency: Quarterly
- Impact factor: .762 (2017)

Standard abbreviations
- ISO 4: Teach. Educ. Spec. Educ.

Indexing
- ISSN: 0888-4064 (print); 1944-4931 (web)
- LCCN: 92662184
- OCLC no.: 4625324

Links
- Journal homepage; Online access; Online archive

Teacher Education and Special Education is a quarterly peer-reviewed academic journal that covers the field of education of children with disabilities. The editor-in-chief is Laurie deBettencourt (Johns Hopkins University). It was established in 1977 and is published by SAGE Publications in association with the Teacher Education Division of the Council for Exceptional Children.

== Abstracting and indexing ==
The journal is abstracted and indexed in:

- ASSIA - Applied Social Sciences Index & Abstracts
- Educational Research Abstracts Online
- ERIC
- Exceptional Child Education Resources
- Wilson Education Index
