= Learning Disability Quarterly =

- Discipline: Special education
- Language: English
- Edited by: Diane Bryant

Publication details
- History: 1978-present
- Publisher: SAGE Publishing on behalf of the Hammill Institute on Disabilities
- Frequency: Quarterly
- Impact factor: 2.132 (2017)

Standard abbreviations
- ISO 4: Learn. Disabil. Q.

Indexing
- ISSN: 0731-9487 (print); 2168-376X (web)
- LCCN: 82641646
- OCLC no.: 1064482703

Links
- Journal homepage; Online access; Online archive; Journal page at Hammill Institute's website

Learning Disability Quarterly is a quarterly peer-reviewed academic journal that covers the field of special education. The editor-in-chief is Diane P. Bryant. The journal was established in 1978 and is published by SAGE Publications on behalf of the Hammill Institute on Disabilities.

== Abstracting and indexing ==
The journal is abstracted and indexed in ERIC and the Social Sciences Citation Index. According to the Journal Citation Reports, its 2017 impact factor is 2.132, ranking it 5 out of 40 journals in the category "Education, Special" and 9 out of 69 journals in the category "Rehabilitation".
