= Journal of Learning Disabilities =

- Discipline: Learning disabilities, education
- Language: English
- Edited by: Stephanie Al Otaiba

Publication details
- History: 1968-present
- Publisher: SAGE Publications
- Frequency: Bimonthly
- Impact factor: 2.341 (2017)

Standard abbreviations
- ISO 4: J. Learn. Disabil.

Indexing
- ISSN: 0022-2194 (print); 1538-4780 (web)
- LCCN: 70011691
- OCLC no.: 1604299

Links
- Journal homepage; Online access; Online archive

Journal of Learning Disabilities is a peer-reviewed academic journal that covers the field of special education. The editor-in-chief is Stephanie Al Otaiba (Southern Methodist University). It was established in 1968 and is currently published by SAGE Publications in association with the Hammill Institute on Disabilities.

== Abstracting and indexing ==
Journal of Learning Disabilities is abstracted and indexed in Scopus and the Social Sciences Citation Index. According to the Journal Citation Reports, its 2017 impact factor is 2.341, ranking it 3rd out of 40 journals in the category "Education, Special" and 6th out of 61 journals in the category "Rehabilitation".
