= Deidre Le Fevre =

New Zealand teacher education professor

Academic background
- Education: University of Michigan
- Thesis: The work of designing video -based multimedia curriculum for learning teaching. (2003)
- Doctoral advisor: Deborah Loewenberg Ball

Deidre Marjorie Le Fevre is a New Zealand academic and is a full professor at the University of Auckland, specialising in educational leadership, teacher training, and education improvement.

== Academic career ==
Le Fevre trained as a teacher in Palmerston North while completing a Bachelor of Education at Massey University. Le Fevre says that during her teacher training, she was different to her peers as her high school experience had not been a good one, and she wanted to change the system. "I... held the strong view that education and schooling needed to change. High school hadn’t worked well for me or for many other young people at that time. I wasn’t interested in maintaining the status quo." She then worked at Ranui Primary School in Auckland, before spending her OE in England, where she worked in inner city schools in London.

Le Fevre returned to Auckland where she completed her master's degree at the University of Auckland, before heading to the University of Michigan for a PhD, which she completed in 2003. Her thesis, supervised by Deborah Loewenberg Ball, was on the use of video in learning in teacher-training. Le Fevre then joined the faculty of Washington State University, where she continued her interest in using video to improve practice: "I would video myself teaching my education courses and the students would analyse and critique me! This was when I really realised the importance of vulnerability, of being willing to take risks in order to learn and change." Returning to New Zealand, Le Fevre rose to full professor at the University of Auckland in 2022. She teaches and researches educational leadership, and researches professional learning in other fields, such as medicine, sports performance and nursing. Other research areas include interpersonal effectiveness, educational improvement, and organisational change.

Le Fevre has co-authored two books, Leading powerful professional learning: Responding to complexity with adaptive expertise and Leading professional learning: Practical strategies for impact in schools with Helen Timperley, Fiona Ell and Kaye Twyford (2019).

== Selected works ==
=== Books ===
- Helen Timperley, Diedre Le Fevre, Fiona Ell, Kaye Twyford Leading professional learning: Practical strategies for impact in schools (Acer Press, December 2019) ISBN 9781742865409
- Deidre Le Fevre, Helen Timperley, Fiona Ell, Kaye Twyford Leading powerful professional learning: Responding to complexity with adaptive expertise (Corwin Press, September 2019) ISBN 9781544386812

=== Papers ===
- Deidre M. Le Fevre (2014). "Barriers to implementing pedagogical change: The role of teachers' perceptions of risk". Teaching and Teacher Education. 38: 56–64. doi:10.1016/j.tate.2013.11.007. Wikidata Q124221697.
- Deidre M. Le Fevre; Robinson, Viviane Marcelle Joan (2014). "The Interpersonal Challenges of Instructional Leadership". Educational Administration Quarterly. 51 (1): 58–95. doi:10.1177/0013161x13518218. Wikidata Q104929709.
- Deidre Le Fevre (2003). "9. Designing for teacher learning: Video-based curriculum design". Advances in Research on Teaching. 10: 235–258. doi:10.1016/s1479-3687(03)10009-0. Wikidata Q124221746.
- A L Garden; D M Le Fevre; H L Waddington; J M Weller (2015). "Debriefing after simulation-based non-technical skill training in healthcare: a systematic review of effective practice". Anaesthesia and Intensive Care. 43 (3): 300–308. doi:10.1177/0310057x1504300303. PMID 25943601. Wikidata Q27687170.
- Deidre M Le Fevre; Dennis W Moore; Ian A G Wilkinson (2003). "Tape-assisted reciprocal teaching: cognitive bootstrapping for poor decoders". British Journal of Educational Psychology. 73 (Pt 1): 37–58. doi:10.1348/000709903762869905. PMID 12639276. Wikidata Q48602487.
- Frauke Meyer; Deidre M. Le Fevre; Viviane M.J. Robinson (2017). "How leaders communicate their vulnerability: implications for trust building". International Journal of Educational Management. 31 (2): 221–235. doi:10.1108/ijem-11-2015-0150. Wikidata Q124221695.
- Deidre M. Le Fevre (2011). "Creating and facilitating a teacher education curriculum using preservice teachers' autobiographical stories". Teaching and Teacher Education. 27 (4): 779–787. doi:10.1016/j.tate.2011.01.003. Wikidata Q124221700.
