= Helen Timperley =

New Zealand professor of education

Helen Timperley CNZM
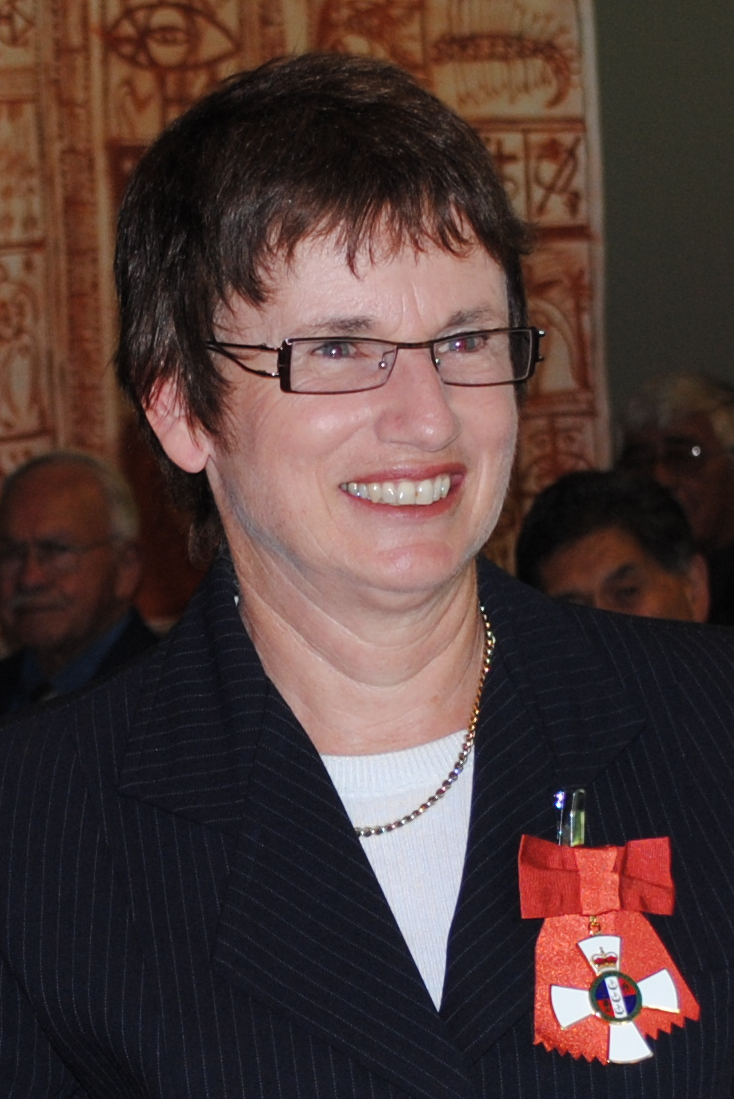
- Timperley in 2010

Academic background
- Education: University of Auckland
- Thesis: The challenge for tomorrow's schools: learning to be responsive (1994)
- Doctoral advisor: Viviane Robinson, Stuart McNaughton

Helen Stapylton Timperley CNZM is a New Zealand education academic, and is professor emerita of education, learning and professional practice at the University of Auckland. In 2010, Timperley was appointed a Companion of the New Zealand Order of Merit, for services to education.

== Academic career ==
Timperley completed a PhD at the University of Auckland, with a thesis titled The challenge for tomorrow's schools: learning to be responsive. Timperley has taught at several levels, including in early childhood, primary and secondary schools, and in special education.

Timperley then joined the faculty of the University of Auckland, where she researched professional and leadership learning in education and promoted them in schools, and led a project on capability in schools for the improvement of student achievement. Timperley publishes widely, and has written six books, and co-authored a report aimed at teachers Using Evidence in Teaching Practice: Implications for Professional Learning. Timperley collaborated over several years with John Hattie on 'visible learning'. Timperley retired in 2014, and is professor emerita of education, learning and professional practice at the University of Auckland. She continues to publish, and her most recent book Leading professional conversations: Adaptive expertise for schools was published by ACER in 2024. The book describes how to use professional conversations to solve some of the implementation problems that can occur in schools, despite good planning and professional teacher development.

== Honours and awards ==
In the 2010 New Year Honours, Timperley was appointed a Companion of the New Zealand Order of Merit, for services to education.

== Selected works ==
- Hattie, John; Timperley, Helen (2007). "The Power of Feedback". Review of Educational Research. 77 (1): 81–112. doi:10.3102/003465430298487. Wikidata Q56407312.
- Daniel Muijs; Leonidas Kyriakides; Greetje van der Werf; Bert Creemers; Timperley, Helen; Lorna Earl (2014). "State of the art – teacher effectiveness and professional learning". School Effectiveness and School Improvement. 25 (2): 231–256. doi:10.1080/09243453.2014.885451. Wikidata Q57914258.
- Kaye Twyford; Deidre Le Fevre; Timperley, Helen (2017). "The influence of risk and uncertainty on teachers' responses to professional learning and development". Journal of Professional Capital and Community. 2 (2): 86–100. doi:10.1108/jpcc-10-2016-0028. Wikidata Q124221696.
- Timperley, Helen (2010). Using evidence in the classroom for professional learning (Report).
