= Invitational education =

Educational theory

Invitational education (IE) is a theory of educational practice that emphasizes the importance of internal knowledge in relation to external connections to the outside world and educational system. A key feature is that a student's positive self-concept, leading to their productivity, be developed through the school environment.

Ideas related to IE were introduced by William Watson Purkey, with contributions from Betty Siegel, late President of Kennesaw State University, with professors John Michael Novak and Peter Wong, together Purkey's co-founders at the International Alliance for Invitational Education (IAIE). Purkey is professor emeritus of counselor education at the University of North Carolina at Greensboro and writes, generally, on the topic of school improvement. John Novak and Peter Wong, also faculty members, were also primary contributors to the development of invitational theory and practice, authoring numerous articles and books on the subject.

== Emphasis, concepts, and the IAIE ==
IE emphasizes the importance of internal knowledge in relation to external connections to the outside world and existing educational systems. A key feature of IE is positive self-concept developed through a school environment that leads to more productivity. As the ideas around IE developed, William Watson Purkey, Betty Siegel, John Michael Novak, and Peter Wong founded the International Alliance for Invitational Education (IAIE) to support the work.

As Purkey and Novak state, "[IE] is characterized by purpose and direction. It recognizes that education can never be neutral and that everything and everybody in and around schools adds to or subtracts from the educative process."

One practice that Purkey promotes is that educators create a personal "Fort Knox" in order to recall the positive aspects of teaching, an archive that might include letters from past students, colleagues, etc. This is argued, based on the fact that teaching can be a demanding career, where Purkey deems it crucial that educators remember the positive impact they can have on others, and why they have decided to dedicate their lives to teaching.

=== Five Domains ===
Invitational Education recognizes five "domains" that comprise everyone and everything in an organization—People, Places, Policies, Programs, and Processes—where Purkey and Novak note that these domains either build or destroy intellectual, social, physical, emotional and moral potential for stakeholders. As argued by its founders, IE's theory and practices have been embedded in schools around the world at all levels, from nursery schools to universities, and has strengthened health care facilities, businesses, non-profits, worship centers, and families.

In Visible Learning, John Hattie's meta-analysis of school improvement research, Hattie writes that Invitational Education "is not 'niceness' at work, but rather an approach that places much reliance on the teachers and schools to make learning exciting, engaging, and enduring. Where there are school differences, it is these types of effects that are the most powerful." Hattie argued, based on his research, that many of the most hotly debated school reform efforts had little effect on school improvement, but those which provide in invitation to learn had the most profound effect.

Harry and Rosemary Wong also apply the IE model and concepts. In their book, The First Days of School, the Wongs explain that effective teachers invite their students and their colleagues to learn together, stating "[a]n invitation makes a person feel able, responsible and valuable. Effective teachers have the power and the ability to maintain an inviting stance in the classroom."
