= Gavin T. L. Brown =

New Zealand educational-assessment researcher

- Citizenship: Canada, New Zealand, UK
- Education: Concordia University (BEd TESL); Massey University (MEd); University of Auckland (PhD)
- Known for: Teacher Conceptions of Assessment (TCoA) inventory; e-asTTle test system
- Awards: Early Career Research Excellence Award (2008); Fellow of the Association for Psychological Science (2022)
- Scientific career
- Fields: Educational assessment; educational psychology
- Workplaces: University of Auckland; Education University of Hong Kong; Umeå University; Thammasat University
- Thesis: Teachers’ Conceptions of Assessment (2003)
- Doctoral advisor: John Hattie

Gavin Thomas Lumsden Brown is an educational researcher and psychometrician based in New Zealand. His work focuses on how teachers and students understand, use and are affected by assessment. He is Professor of Learning, Development and Professional Practice and directs the Quantitative Data Analysis and Research (Quant-DARE) unit at the University of Auckland. Brown created the multidimensional Teacher Conceptions of Assessment (TCoA) self-report inventory, now used in more than twenty jurisdictions, and was part of the team that built New Zealand's online diagnostic test system e-asTTle.

== Personal life ==
Brown was born in Dundee, Scotland. At age 1, his father joined the Royal Canadian Air Force, so he was raised on various military bases in New Brunswick, Quebec, and Ontario. At age 10, his father was posted to Canadian Forces Base Baden-Soelingen in the Black Forest of Germany. He lived in Europe until 21 when he moved to Montreal, where he lived for 7 years, completing a BEd TESL. He moved to NZ, with his NZ wife Judith, in 1983, where he took up teaching adults English as second language before working in south and west Auckland high schools. He has 4 adult children, living in Canada, Sweden, and New Zealand.

== Education ==
Brown trained as a teacher at Concordia University, Montréal (BEd TESL, 1981), completed an MEd with first-class honours at Massey University (1996) and earned his PhD in education at the University of Auckland in 2003.

== Career ==
After thirteen years teaching in secondary schools, Brown joined the New Zealand Council for Educational Research as an assessment developer. He later managed the Ministry-funded e-asTTle project at Auckland UniServices before moving into academia. Since 2016 he has been a full professor at the University of Auckland; earlier appointments include associate professor at the Hong Kong Institute of Education (2009–2011) and Honorary Professor of Curriculum & Instruction at the Education University of Hong Kong (2016–present). From 2016-2023 Brown also held an Associerad Professor status in Educational Measurement at Umeå University, Sweden, and is the 2023-26 Bualuang ASEAN Chair Professor in the Faculty of Learning Sciences and Education at Thammasat University in Bangkok.

== Research ==
Brown's research examines "assessment cultures" – the beliefs that teachers and learners hold about the purposes of assessment – and how those beliefs influence classroom practice and policy implementation. The TCoA inventory he devised has been translated into ten languages and is frequently used to study the tension between improvement-oriented and accountability-oriented assessment systems.

Brown has published more than 260 scholarly works (full details available on Google Scholar). His book Assessment of Student Achievement (Routledge, 2018) offers a concise synthesis of contemporary assessment theory and practice. His work with European colleagues showed that achievement in mathematics is based on warranted confidence in one's abilities. He is the lead editor for the Handbook of Human and Social Conditions in Assessment (Routledge) in both 1st and 2nd editions. He is founding section editor for "Assessment, Testing and Applied Measurement’’ in the journal Frontiers in Education.

== Honours and awards ==
Brown has received multiple awards:

Computerworld Excellence Award for Use of IT in Education, Project asTTle Team, The University of Auckland (2003).

Early Career Research Excellence Award, University of Auckland (2008)

Distinguished Paper Award, Classroom Assessment SIG, American Educational Research Association (2015).

Elected Fellow of the Association for Psychological Science (2022)

Listed among the world’s top 2% most-cited scientists in the Stanford–Elsevier database (2024).

== Selected works ==
Brown, G. T. L. Assessment of Student Achievement. Routledge, 2018.

Brown, G. T. L. (2022). "The past, present and future of educational assessment: A transdisciplinary perspective." Frontiers in Education, 7, 1060633.

Brown, G. T. L., Andersson, C., Winberg, M., & Palm, T. (2023). "Predicting formative feedback practices: improving learning and minimising a tendency to ignore feedback." Frontiers in Education, 8, 1241998.

Michaelides, M., Brown, G. T. L., Eklöf, H., & Papanastasiou, E. (2019). Motivational Profiles in TIMSS Mathematics: Exploring Student Clusters across Countries and Time (Vol. 7). Springer Open & IEA.
