= Bentley Rare Book Gallery =

The Bentley Rare Book Gallery is a rare book library housed on the lower level of the Horace W. Sturgis Library at Kennesaw State University in Kennesaw, Georgia, United States. It is one of only three certified, museum-grade rare book libraries in Georgia; the others are located at the University of Georgia in Athens and Emory University in Atlanta. Named after Fred D. Bentley Sr., one of its principal benefactors, and his wife Sarah Bentley, the library contains a diverse collection of works documenting the history of the written and printed word in English.

== History ==
The rare book room was a result of a collaboration between Library Director, Robert Williams, College President, Dr. Betty Siegel, and Fred Bentley.

== Design ==
The gallery is designed to resemble a "domestic library in a middle-class household during the reign of King George III (1760-1820)." Other cited sources for the design were Agatha Christie's description of her ideal home in her autobiography, the Edwardian imagery of E. M. Forster, and Edith Wharton's "The Decoration of Houses."

The space, on the ground floor of the Sturgis Library, was dramatically transformed into an immersive environment in which patrons can interact with and appreciate the collection. The room’s woodwork was entirely hand crafted to evoke an authentic atmosphere. Behind these beautiful surroundings, modern technology and systems were utilized to make the space secure and environmentally controlled. The Gallery was completed with period pieces that highlight the rich cultural and social history of objects and complement their setting.

=== Notable volumes and literary items ===
- Franciscan breviary from northern Italy (1450)
- A leaf from the Golden Legend (c. 1470)
- A leaf from Tractatus et Sermones (1490)
- A leaf from Recollections on the History of England (c. 1470)
- Voi chascoltate inrime sparse (1472)
- The Divine Comedy (1502)
- The Complete Works of Chaucer (1542)
- Aesopi Phrygii Fabulae Graece Latine Conversae (1544)
- Newe Testament of Our Lord Iesus Christ [sic] (1583)
- The vvorkes of the most high and mightie prince, Iames by the grace of God, King of Great Britaine, France and Ireland, defender of the faith, &c. (1616)
- Fourth Folio of William Shakespeare (1685)
- Paradise Regained (1758)
- Strange Case of Dr. Jekyll and Mr. Hyde (1886)
- Trilby (1895)
- Tristram Shandy (complete nine volumes)
- The Adventures of Huckleberry Finn (first edition)
- Up From Slavery (original copy - signed by Booker T. Washington)

== Department of Museums, Archives & Rare Books ==
The Bentley Rare Book Gallery is part of Kennesaw State University's Department of Museums, Archives & Rare Books. In addition to the rare book collection, the department is responsible for the University Archives and Special Collections, Records Management, Art Museum and Galleries, and the Museum of History and Holocaust Education.
