= Teaching and learning center =

Independent academic units within colleges and universities

Teaching and learning centers are independent academic units within colleges and universities that exist to provide support services for faculty, to help teaching faculty to improve their teaching and professional development. Teaching centers also routinely provide professional development for graduate students as they prepare for future careers as teaching faculty. Some centers also may provide learning support services for students, and other services, depending on the individual institution. Teaching and learning centers may have different kinds of names, such as faculty development centers, teaching and learning centers, centers for teaching and learning, centers for teaching excellence, academic support centers, and others; a common abbreviation is TLC.

== History ==
The first teaching and learning center in North America was University of Michigan's Center for Research on Learning and Teaching, established in 1962.

== Purpose ==
University professors, part-time instructors, or teaching assistants approach teaching as experts in their field and know their contents. However, that does not guarantee success in teaching, as teaching expertise is an altogether different matter. Many instructors have not been trained in teaching methods, and may have difficulties conveying contents and concepts to students, who are relative novices. Novice students approach the information and contents in a course in a much different way than expert teachers, and teachers may not understand the conceptual divide between them and their students. Novice students may perceive the contents of lectures and textbooks as large amounts of information, rather than as meaningful concepts, in contrast to experts, who can naturally see the materials as coherent and meaningful, due to years of mastery. Those who rely on traditional teacher-centered methods such as pure lecture may inadvertently subject students to an information dump, or fail to connect with students at a conceptual level, leaving students unable to learn or retain information in a meaningful manner.

Teaching and learning centers exist to help instructors to modernize their teaching style, to scaffold concepts and information in a way that students can meaningfully take in, and to help students learn more deeply and retain what they have learned. As such, these centers assume roles as educational change agents. Such centers also attempt to help instructors with other problems that they might have, such as managing graduate students, designing courses, technical writing, trying novel teaching methods, and designing better assignments and exams. Some centers may address learning difficulties at the students' end, by providing support services for better learning and study skills. Some centers may also be involved in e-learning and similar movements.

== Faculty support services ==
Teaching and learning centers typically offer professional development services for faculty, particularly to help them improve their teaching and professional careers. Depending on the institution, these may be optional for professors, or required for new professors or those facing difficulties in teaching performance. Some universities in the American system may require graduate teaching assistants who teach university courses to participate in training or coaching programs. Such centers also work to promote more modern teaching methods, discussion, and institutional changes in teaching practices and in the academic environment.

Instructional coaching is one service typically offered to faculty members. In a coaching session, an instructor meets with an instructional coach or consultant (an education specialist or researcher), who can provide guidance to the instructor in improving his or her teaching skills and pedagogical expertise. Depending on the institution, this may be optional or required for new professors or other teaching staff. Others may be required to seek coaching if cited for poor teaching performance. Others may choose to visit an instructional coach for help with difficulties in teaching, or simply out of a self-motivated desire to improve one's teaching ability, or for advice or instruction on using new teaching techniques.

Micro-teaching workshops are sessions where instructors present a short demo lecture or mini-lecture, either part of a real lecture, or a condensed version of a lecture, in front of other colleagues or an educational consultant. The presenter can receive feedback on his or her teaching and presentation skills from peers and from the instructional coach or consultant. Many TLCs in Canada and around the world, for example, have implemented the Instructional Skills Workshop since 1978 as a peer micro-teaching certificate program.

Workshops or "brown bag" meetings may be offered by the center's staff or outside speakers on various aspects of professional development and teaching techniques. Workshops may provide instruction in newer teaching techniques, by introducing techniques to instructors and/or helping them to better implement these methods, as well as helping them to make more effective use of traditional methods such as lectures and lecture-discussion formats. Newer or more student-centered techniques might include group activities, active learning or cooperative learning, problem based learning (PBL), discovery based learning, experiential learning, or non-traditional forms of assessment such as portfolios and formative assessment techniques. Orientation workshops can also introduce teaching skills as well as other necessary information for newer faculty members.

Teaching and learning centers may also sponsor and facilitate faculty learning communities (FLCs) for professional development in teaching. FLCs consist of instructors, often similar or related fields, to meet in small groups to troubleshoot difficulties and issues that they face in teaching, and to brainstorm or research solutions. Members meet regularly to discuss issues and findings, and may engage in journaling or other means of promoting reflective practice about their teaching. FLCs also promote a sense of community and sharing of teaching experience.

Other services may include workshops, brown bags meetings, or consultation services in other areas of professional development for teachers. Topics in teaching skills can be addressed, such as improving one's lectures or course design for more student-centered and interesting lessons, teaching specific academic skills, using new instructional technologies, and help with presentation skills. Teacher-student issues might include understanding and addressing difficulties that students might have; guidance on how to mentor graduate students; and understanding issues of gender, race or other factors that can affect classroom dynamics and academic performance; e.g., linguistic and educational research has shown that female and male students interact differently in small group versus full-class discussions. Evaluation and assessment issues can include such as designing assignments, designing quizzes and exams, grading, and giving feedback. Career-related help is provided by some centers for matters like help with writing grants, academic job search skills, and creating teaching portfolios for those seeking academic jobs. For instructors who are not native speakers of English, such centers may provide some help or referrals for instructors in English for academic purposes (EAP).

== Other activities ==
Other services might be offered by a teaching and learning center, though this varies among institutions.

Some centers provide support services for students in study and learning skills, or even peer tutoring programs. At many institutions, however, student support services may fall under the domain of learning resource centers or student counseling centers.

Some centers provide support for e-learning and research on e-learning programs and techniques. Some may participate in e-learning movements and consortia such as the OpenCourseWare (OCW) movement.

TLCs may also offer longer workshops or formal courses on graduate supervision theory and practice.

Some TLCs go beyond the individual teacher level to system support, for example facilitating department retreats on curriculum or program level mapping of concepts and skills through courses and year levels, for redesign or new design or accreditation purposes.

Such centers may also conduct internal evaluations on the effectiveness of academic programs, or may manage student feedback on instructors' performance, and provide faculty help in understanding and making use of students' course feedback. Educational researchers at some centers conduct educational research on teaching methods or e-learning programs, and research in the scholarship of teaching and learning (SOTL). The POD Network sponsors annual conferences and publications.

SIMAD University Office of the Registrar provides information and services to meet the needs of members of the university community.
