= Invitational =

An invitational is a competition where only invited competitors may participate.

Invitational can also refer to:

== Sport ==
- Invitational tournament

=== College sports ===
- National Invitational Tournament, a U.S. men's college basketball tournament
- College Basketball Invitational, a U.S. men's college basketball tournament
- Maui Invitational Tournament, a U.S. college basketball tournament
- ESPN Events Invitational, a U.S. college basketball tournament

=== Golf ===
- LIV Golf Invitational Series
- WGC Invitational, a former professional golf tournament
- Arnold Palmer Invitational, a professional golf tournament on the PGA Tour
- Memphis Invitational Open, a former professional golf tournament on the PGA Tour
- Farmers Insurance Open, formerly known as Buick Invitational of California, a U.S. professional golf tournament on the PGA Tour
- Colonial National Invitation, a U.S. professional golf tournament on the PGA Tour
- Genesis Invitational, a U.S. professional golf tournament on the PGA Tour
- Bluegrass Invitational, a former professional golf tournament on the PGA Tour from 1965 to 1974

=== Card games ===
- Cavendish Invitational, the largest money bridge tournament in the world

=== Video games ===
- Mid-Season Invitational, an annual League of Legends tournament
- eNASCAR iRacing Pro Invitational Series, a former series of sim racing events originally organized for NASCAR drivers

== Other ==
- Invitational education, an educational theory focused on developing school environment for a positive self-concept in pupils
- Invitational rhetoric, a form of rhetoric based on invitation to understanding

== See also ==
- Invitation (disambiguation)
- Wild card (sports), a system in sports where teams/athletes who are not formally qualified are nevertheless invited to participate
