= Edward J. Maloney =

American academic (born 1968)

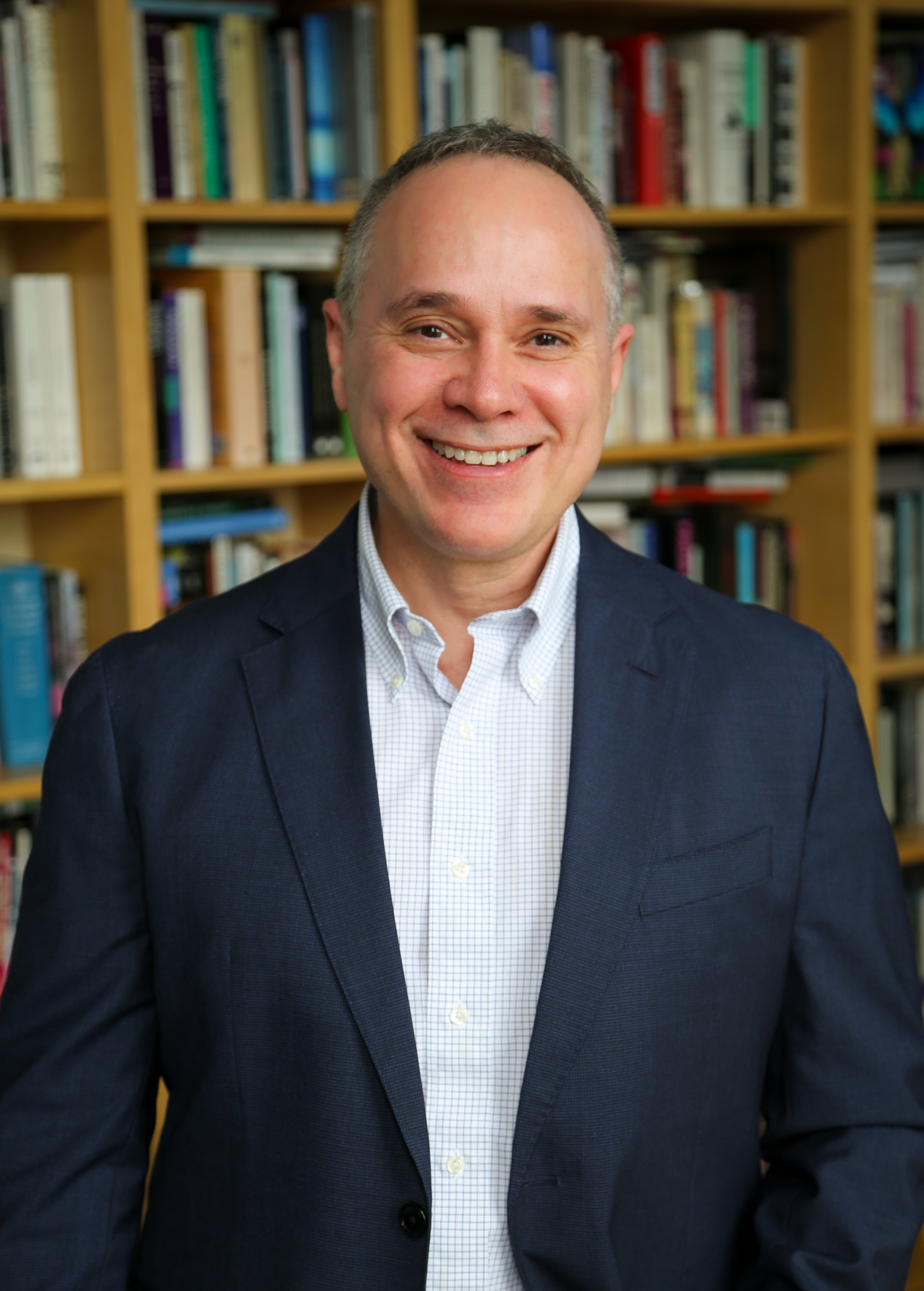
- Born: August 8, 1968 (age 58); Hartford, Connecticut
- Occupations: Executive Director, CNDLS; Faculty member, Georgetown University

Academic background
- Education: Syracuse University (BA, MA) Cornell University (certification) Ohio State University (PhD)

Edward J. "Eddie" Maloney (August 8, 1968-) is Executive Director of the Center for New Designs in Learning and Scholarship at Georgetown University. He is also Professor of the Practice of Narrative Theory and Literature in the English Department. He is known for studies on how higher education responds to crisis and technological change.

== Early life and education ==
Maloney was born in Hartford, Connecticut on August 8, 1968. He graduated from East Windsor High School in 1986. Maloney began his undergraduate studies at Syracuse University as a computer science major before switching to English and Textual Studies, earning a BA (1990) and MA (1993). This early intersection of technology and literary theory became central to his intellectual interests. His scholarly work has focused on critical theory and the ways technology and pedagogy inform one another in higher education. He earned a graduate certificate from the School of Criticism and Theory of Cornell University in 1997 and completed his Ph.D. in English at The Ohio State University, Footnotes in Fiction: A Rhetorical Approach, in 2005.

== Research ==
Maloney is the chair of Georgetown’s Academic Innovation Network. His research began with narrative theory and literary studies but has moved into studies of higher education. He has published three books on higher education with Johns Hopkins University Press, working with Joshua Kim, the Assistant Provost for Online Learning Strategy at Dartmouth College. Maloney was influenced by a group of academic theorists at The Ohio State University, Distinguished Professor of English James Phelan, Distinguished Humanities Professor of English and Rhodes scholar Brian McHale, and Academy Professor and Guggenheim fellow Morris Beja. He works closely with Randy Bass of Georgetown University, and with faculty development and educational design leaders through HAIL, edX, RNL, and global innovation summits.
