= Melinda Webber =

New Zealand education researcher

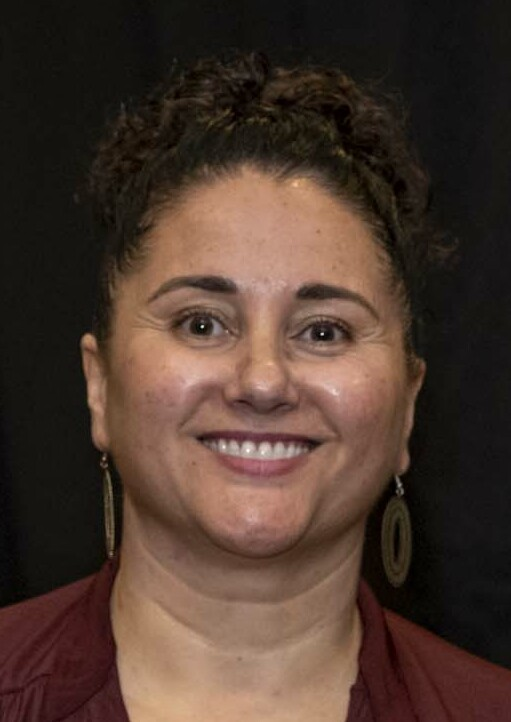
- Webber in 2023
- Awards: Rutherford Discovery Fellowship

Academic background
- Education: University of Auckland
- Theses: Hybrid Māori/Pākeha: Explorations of identity for people of mixed Māori/Pākeha descent (Master's thesis) (2007); Identity matters: Racial-ethnic representations among adolescents attending multi-ethnic high schools (2011)
- Doctoral advisor: Elizabeth McKinley; John Hattie

Melinda Webber is a New Zealand academic, and is a full professor at the University of Auckland, specialising in Māori identity and ways in which race, ethnicity, identity and culture impact on young people and their success. She is of Ngāti Hau, Ngāti Kahu, Ngāpuhi and Ngāti Whakaue descent. In 2026 Webber was awarded the Royal Society Te Apārangi's Metge Medal.

== Academic career ==
Webber completed a master's thesis titled Hybrid Māori/Pākeha: Explorations of identity for people of mixed Māori/Pākeha descent in 2007, and a PhD titled Identity matters: Racial-ethnic representations among adolescents attending multi-ethnic high schools in 2011, both at the University of Auckland. Her doctoral advisors were Elizabeth McKinley and John Hattie. In 2017, Webber received a Rutherford Discovery Fellowship to explore identity and success from an iwi perspective. She has also received a Marsden Fast Start grant, and in 2013 was a Fulbright Scholar. For her Fulbright award, Webber travelled to University of Wisconsin–Green Bay to share knowledge with their First Nations Studies programme. Webber then joined the faculty at the university, rising to full professor in 2022.

Webber is part of the Ngā Pae o te Maramatanga Centre of Research Excellence, and associate director of the Woolf Fisher Research Centre. Webber is on the editorial board of a number of journals, including the Australian Journal of Gifted Education, Contemporary Educational Psychology, and MAI Journal: A New Zealand Journal of Indigenous Scholarship.

Webber's research on reversing negative stereotypes has resulted in the publication of two books published by Auckland University Press, A Fire in the Belly of Hineāmaru, also available in te reo as Ka Ngangana Tonu a Hineāmaru, He Kōrero Tuku Iho nō Te Tai Tokerau. The books contain 24 biographies of Māori tūpuna, and was listed in Books of Mana as one of the 180 most significant works of Māori-authored non-fiction.

In 2026 Webber was awarded the Royal Society Te Apārangi's Metge Medal, for "a social scientist who has not only shown excellence in their research area but also in creating connections and opportunities for others in the field". The citation noted her role as a co-director of Atlantic Fellows for Social Equity, and her contributions towards the development of the New Zealand school curriculum.

== Selected works ==
- Santamaría, Lorri; Santamaría, Andrés; Webber, Melinda; Pearson, Hoana (2020). "Indigenous Urban School Leadership: A Critical Cross-Cultural Comparative Analysis of Educational Leaders in New Zealand and the United States". Comparative and International Education. 43 (1). doi:10.5206/cie-eci.v43i1.9240. Wikidata Q113247953.
- Faircloth, Susan; Hynds, Anne; Webber, Melinda (2019). "Exploring methodological and ethical opportunities and challenges when researching with Indigenous youth on issues of identity and culture". International Journal of Qualitative Studies in Education. 33 (9): 971–986. doi:10.1080/09518398.2019.1697467. Wikidata Q113278609.
- Turner, Hana; Rubie, Christine Margaret; Webber, Melinda (2015). "Teacher Expectations, Ethnicity and the Achievement Gap". New Zealand Journal of Educational Studies. 50 (1): 55–69. doi:10.1007/s40841-015-0004-1. Wikidata Q123198293.
- Mohamed Alansari; Worrell, Frank C.; Rubie, Christine Margaret; Webber, Melinda (2013). "Adolescent time attitude scale (ATAS) scores and academic outcomes in secondary school females in New Zealand". International journal of quantitative research in education. 1 (3): 251. doi:10.1504/ijqre.2013.057687. Wikidata Q123198658.
