= Christine Rubie-Davies =

New Zealand education academic

Christine Rubie-Davies MNZM FRSNZ
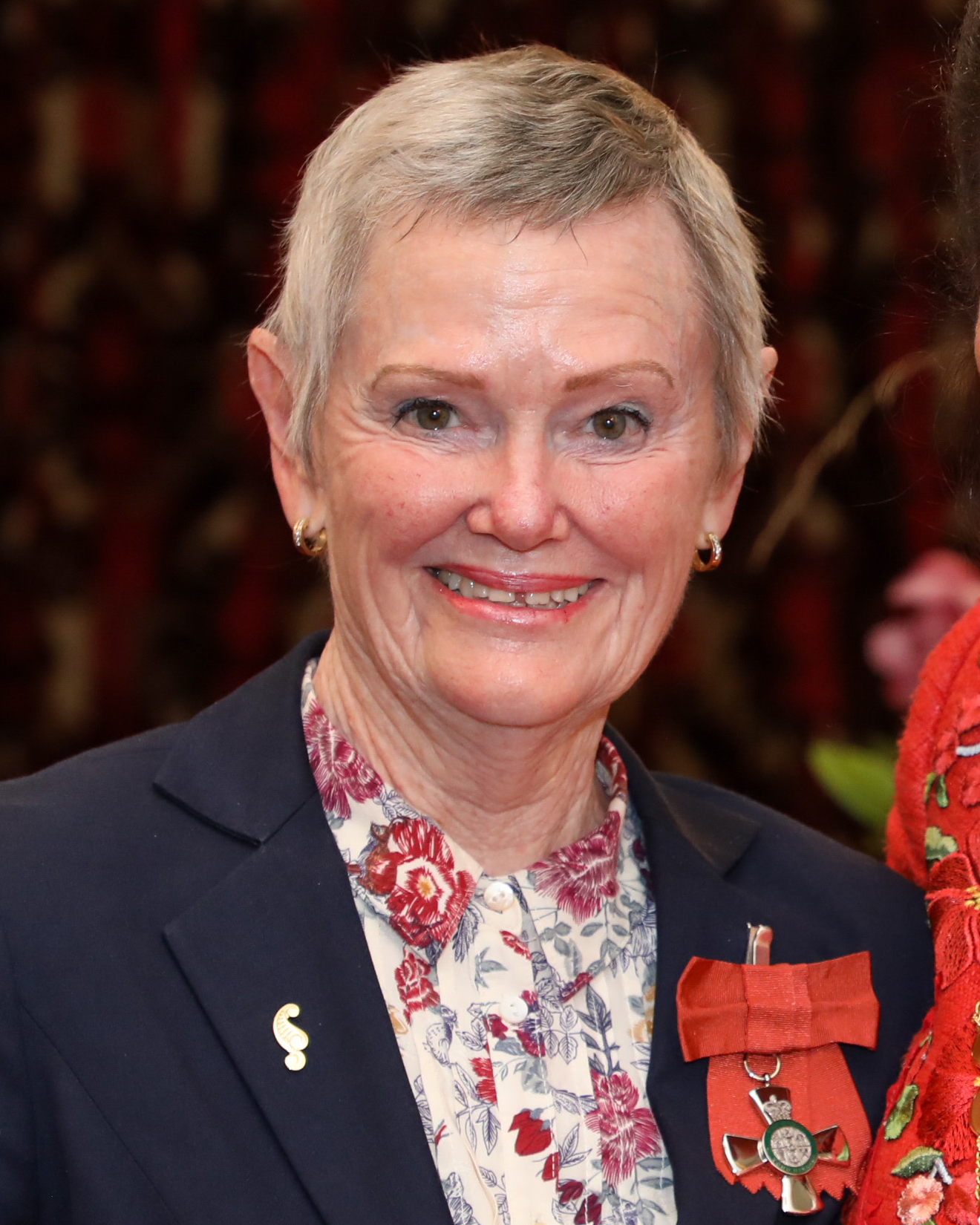
- Rubie-Davies in 2023
- Education: University of Auckland
- Scientific career
- Fields: Teacher education
- Workplaces: University of Auckland
- Thesis: Expecting the best : instructional practices, teacher beliefs and student outcomes (2003)
- Doctoral advisor: John Hattie, Michael Townsend, Richard Hamilton

Christine Margaret Rubie-Davies MNZM FRSNZ is a New Zealand education academic, and as of 2014 is a full professor and head of school at the University of Auckland.

== Academic career ==
After more than two decades working in primary education and a 2003 PhD titled 'Expecting the best : instructional practices, teacher beliefs and student outcomes' at the University of Auckland, Rubie-Davies joined the staff, rising to full professor.

Rubie-Davies was elected a Fellow of the Royal Society of New Zealand in 2022. In the 2023 New Year Honours, she was appointed a Member of the New Zealand Order of Merit, for services to education.

== Selected works ==
- Rubie-Davies, Christine, John Hattie, and Richard Hamilton. "Expecting the best for students: Teacher expectations and academic outcomes." British Journal of Educational Psychology 76, no. 3 (2006): 429–444.
- Rubie-Davies, Christine M. "Classroom interactions: Exploring the practices of high-and low-expectation teachers." British Journal of Educational Psychology 77, no. 2 (2007): 289–306.
- Rubie-Davies, Christine M. "Teacher expectations and student self-perceptions: Exploring relationships." Psychology in the Schools 43, no. 5 (2006): 537–552.
- Rubie-Davies, Christine M. "Teacher expectations and perceptions of student attributes: Is there a relationship?." British Journal of Educational Psychology 80, no. 1 (2010): 121–135.
- Rubie-Davies, Christine M., Annaline Flint, and Lyn G. McDonald. "Teacher beliefs, teacher characteristics, and school contextual factors: What are the relationships?." British Journal of Educational Psychology 82, no. 2 (2012): 270–288.
