= College Teaching =

- Language: English

Standard abbreviations
- ISO 4: Coll. Teach.

Indexing
- ISSN: 8756-7555

College Teaching (formerly Improving College & University Teaching) is a quarterly cross-disciplinary academic journal focused on the subject of teaching in higher education and the Scholarship of Teaching and Learning, with special focus on improving student learning. The journal website states that it "provides an interdisciplinary academic forum on issues in teaching and learning at the undergraduate or graduate level." The journal employs double-blind peer review.

The first issue was published in 1953 under the title Improving College and University Teaching, and the current title was adopted in 1985.

According to Scopus, the CiteScore 2017 was .45. Scimago lists the journal as Q3, SJR .27 for 2017.

== Publication information ==
- Quarterly
- Publisher: currently Taylor & Francis, formerly published by Heldref Publications
