= Daniel S. Papp =

American academic (born 1948)

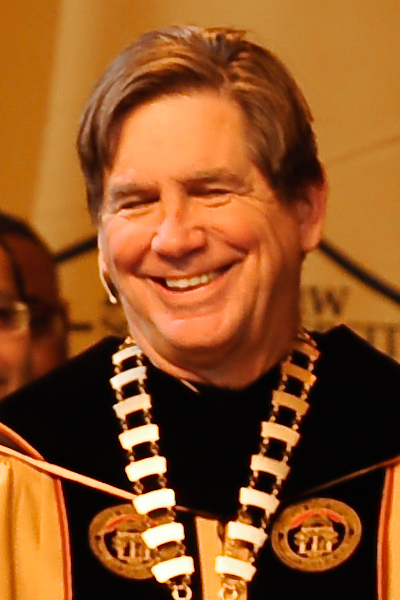
- Kennesaw State University President

President of Kennesaw State University
- In office July 2006 – June 2016
- Preceded by: Betty Lentz Siegel
- Succeeded by: Sam Olens

Personal details
- Education: Dartmouth College (BA); University of Miami (PhD)
- Website: Kennesaw State University Official Biography

Daniel S. Papp (born 1948) is an American scholar of international affairs and policy. Papp served in a variety of professorial and administrative roles in the University System of Georgia (USG) (1973 - 2016). From 2006 to 2016, Papp served as President of Kennesaw State University (KSU), the third-largest university in the state of Georgia. During Papp's tenure, the university's enrollment increased by approximately seventy-five percent, growing from 19,854 to 33,252 undergraduate and graduate students. Under Papp, the university also significantly increased its research and graduate profile, adding a number of new academic programs (including eleven (11) doctoral degrees) and becoming classified as a Doctoral University with Moderate Research Activity. In Fall 2015, a university employee alleged the university's director of food services was engaged in fiscal misconduct, leading to an investigation by the Georgia Bureau of Investigation and USG. Investigations uncovered evidence the university's business office and external foundation were not consistently following USG financial procedures and mandatory reporting of financial misconduct policy. Termination of several high-ranking University employees followed. The investigation also contended the university's external foundation prematurely disbursed approximately $577,000 Papp earned in deferred compensation. While there was no evidence Papp approved or was aware of improprieties, on May 10, 2016, Papp announced his retirement.

== Education ==
Papp is a Phi Beta Kappa graduate of Dartmouth College with a bachelor's degree in International Affairs in 1969. In 1973, Papp received a Ph.D. in international affairs from the University of Miami. He is a member of the Sigma Alpha Epsilon fraternity.

== Career ==
=== Professorial career ===
In 1973, Papp was hired as an assistant professor of international affairs at the Georgia Institute of Technology (colloquially known as Georgia Tech) in 1973. While in this position, Papp's scholarship centered upon international security policy‚ U.S. and Union of Soviet Socialist Republics (U.S.S.R.) foreign and defense policies‚ and international system change. During his tenure at Georgia Tech, Papp seven as a visiting and research professor at Fudan University (Shanghai, China); The Center for Aerospace Doctrine, Research and Education at the U.S. Air War College (Montgomery, Alabama); The Strategic Studies Institute at the U.S. Army War College, (Carlisle, Pennsylvania); and the Western Australia Institute of Technology (Perth, Australia). In 1980, he became the director of Georgia Tech's School of Social Sciences (now Ivan Allen College of Liberal Arts). In 1990 he was appointed founding director and professor for Georgia Tech's Sam Nunn School of International Affairs.

==== Scholarship ====
Papp the author or editor of ten books on international security policy, U.S. and U.S.S.R. foreign and defense policies, and the impact of information and communications technologies on national security and international affairs. These include editing of the autobiography of Dean Rusk, former U.S. secretary of state, during the Kennedy and Johnson administrations and co-authoring “American Foreign Policy: History, Politics, Policies." Other authored works include "Contemporary International Relations" (5th Edition‚ 1997); "Soviet Policies toward the Developing World: The Dilemmas of Power and Presence" (1986); "Soviet Perceptions of the Developing World in the 1980s: The Ideological Basis" (1985); and "Vietnam: The View from Moscow‚ Peking‚ Washington" (1981). Papp co−edited "The Information Age Anthology" (1997); "International Space Policy" (1987); "The Political Economy of International Technology Transfer" (1986); and "Communist Nations' Military Assistance" (1983). Papp also published more than 60 journal articles and chapters in edited books.

==== Professorial and scholarly awards ====
In 1993, Papp was designated distinguished professor at Georgia Tech, becoming the first professor of a discipline outside engineering or physical sciences to earn the honor at the institution. Papp's work was also twice recognized by the United States Department of Defense with the Outstanding Civilian Service medal. Papp's scholarship also earned recognition with a Sloan Scholarship and United States Defense Education Act Scholarship.

=== Career as an academic administrator ===
In 1994, Papp was invited to serve as the faculty executive assistant to G. Wayne Clough, president of Georgia Tech. This position is often viewed as a preparation for university- or university system-level senior administration. In 1997, as the conclusion of his service to President Clough, Papp was named interim president of Southern Polytechnic State University.

==== Interim president of Southern Polytechnic State University ====
During Papp's tenure as interim president of Southern Polytechnic State University, his principal responsibility was to facilitate the selection of the university's new president.

=== President of KSU ===
Prior to his appointment at KSU, he was the senior vice chancellor for academics and fiscal affairs to the University System of Georgia.

== Notes ==
Academic offices
Preceded by Betty L. Siegel	3rd President of the Kennesaw State University; 2006–2016	Succeeded by Sam Olens
