= Deborah Loewenberg Ball =

American mathematics education researcher

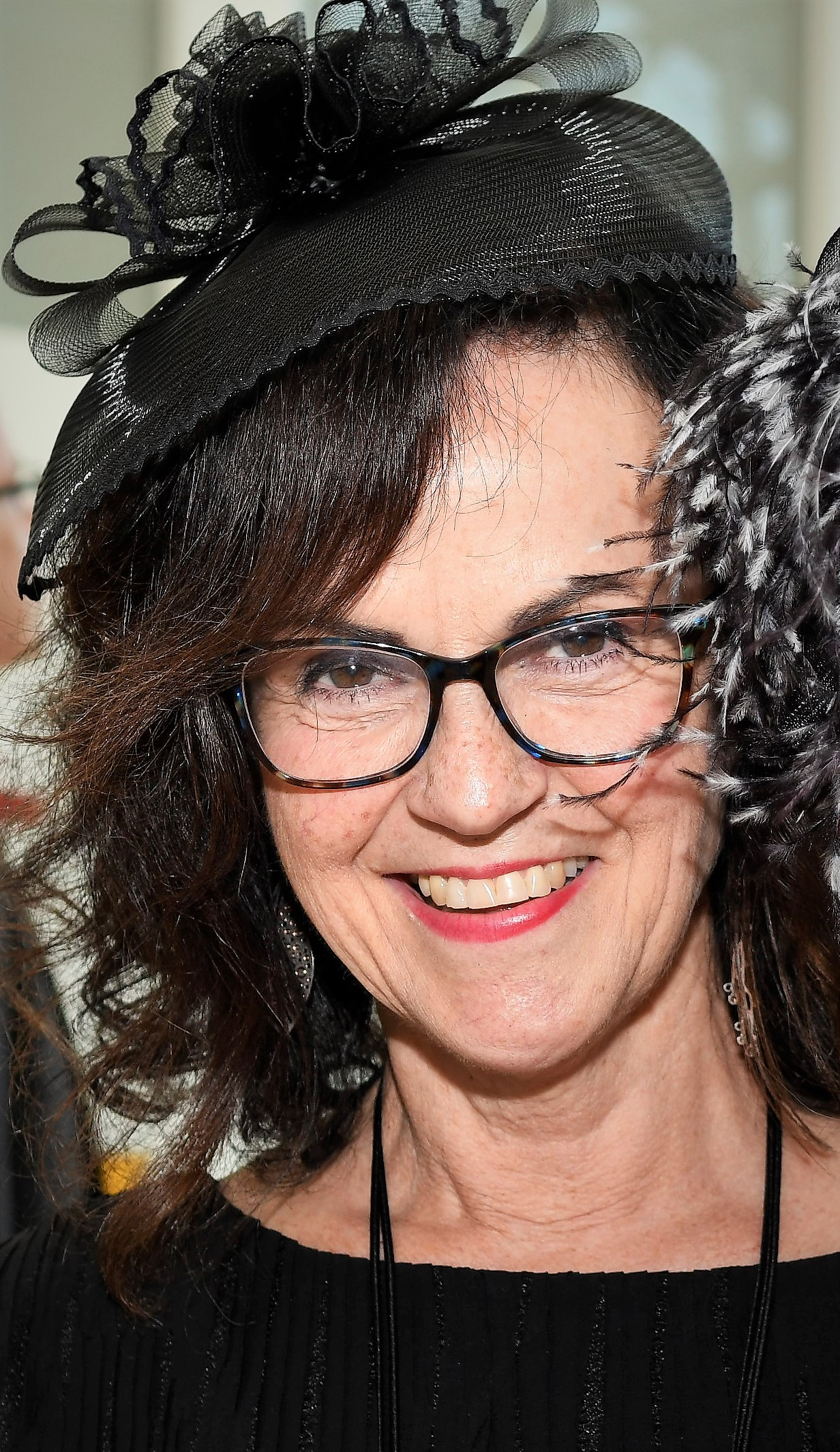
- Deborah Loewenberg Ball at the 2017 National Science Board Awards Ceremony
- Education: Ph.D. from Michigan State University (1988)
- Alma mater: Michigan State University
- Occupation: Educational researcher
- Employer: University of Michigan
- Organization: TeachingWorks
- Known for: Mathematics instruction, mathematical preparation of teachers
- Title: William H. Payne Collegiate Professor of Education
- Children: 3

Deborah Loewenberg Ball is an educational researcher noted for her work in mathematics instruction and the mathematical preparation of teachers. From 2017 to 2018 she served as president of the American Educational Research Association. She served as dean of the School of Education at the University of Michigan from 2005 to 2016, and she currently works as William H. Payne Collegiate Professor of education. Ball directs TeachingWorks, a major project at the University of Michigan to redesign the way that teachers are prepared for practice, and to build materials and tools that will serve the field of teacher education broadly. In a sometimes divisive field, Ball has a reputation of being respected by both mathematicians and educators. She is also an extremely well-respected mentor to junior faculty members and graduate students.

== Education ==
As an undergraduate at Michigan State University, Ball majored in French and then taught elementary school for seventeen years in East Lansing, Michigan. Ball only started serious study of mathematics when she saw her students struggling in math. In 1988 she received her Ph.D. from Michigan State University from the department of teacher education. Her thesis was titled Knowledge and reasoning in Mathematical Pedagogy: Examining What Prospective Teachers Bring to teacher education.

== Research ==
Ball's research focuses on improving the effectiveness and quality of mathematical instruction. Much of her work investigates the mathematical knowledge needed for teaching, and she was among the first to suggest that this knowledge is qualitatively different from what is taught in advanced mathematics classes.

Notable students of Ball's include Deidre Le Fevre, Professor of Learning, Development and Professional Practice at University of Auckland in New Zealand.

== Awards and Positions ==
In 2004, Ball and coauthors David K. Cohen and Stephen W. Raudenbush won the Palmer O. Johnson Award presented by the American Educational Research Association for the best article published in an AERA journal in 2003 for their paper Resources, instruction, and research. In 2007, she was elected member of the National Academy of Education (NAEd). In 2008, she won the Outstanding Contributions to Mathematics Education Award, presented by the Michigan Council of Teachers of Mathematics. In 2009, she won the 19th Louise Hay Award for Outstanding Contributions to Mathematics Education, presented by the Association for Women in Mathematics. In 2012 she became a fellow of the American Mathematical Society. Ball is included in deck 2 of EvenQuads which is a series of playing card decks that feature notable women in mathematics published by the Association of Women in Mathematics.

In 1999, Ball was appointed by U.S. Secretary of Education Richard Riley to serve on the National Commission on Mathematics and Science Teaching for the 21st Century, a committee chaired by Senator John Glenn. From 1999 to 2003, Ball served as chair of the RAND Mathematics Study Panel, whose work culminated in the publication Mathematical Proficiency for All Students: Toward a Strategic Research and Development Program in Mathematics Education. In 2003, Ball was appointed to the board of trustees of the Mathematical Sciences Research Institute, and serves as the chair of the Education Committee there. In 2006, Ball was appointed by U.S. Secretary of Education Margaret Spellings to the National Mathematics Advisory Panel.

== Family ==
Ball is married and has 3 children. Her husband, Richard Ball, also focuses on the educational field as a middle school teacher. Their children, Sarah, Joshua and Jacob, work on different fields of education.
