= The Sentinel (KSU) =

Student newspaper at Kennesaw State University

Coordinates: 34.037876°N 84.58102°W

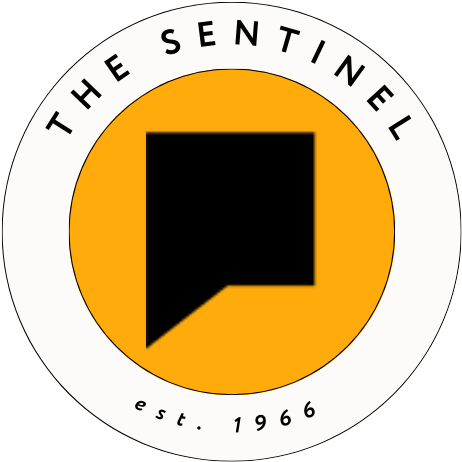

- The April 3, 2007 front page of The Sentinel
- Type: Weekly student newspaper
- Format: Broadsheet
- Owner: Kennesaw State University
- Publisher: Kennesaw State University
- Founded: 1966
- Headquarters: 1000 Chastain Road; Kennesaw 30144; USA
- Circulation: 5,000-6,000
- OCLC number: 766020808
- Website: theksusentinel.com

The Sentinel is the official student newspaper of Kennesaw State University (KSU) in Kennesaw, Georgia. As of the fall 2018 semester, the Sentinel had a weekly circulation between 5,000 and 6,000, distributed to over 30 locations on the KSU campus.

The first issue of The Sentinel was published on October 3, 1966, shortly after the charter quarter of Kennesaw State. Robert McDearmid served as the charter editor in chief. The paper has printed continuously since its founding. It is published weekly during the school year, with limited issues during the summer semester. In 2005 it was one of 25 collegiate newspapers to receive the Pacemaker award from the Associated Collegiate Press for the print edition, and was a finalist for its online edition.

== Sections ==
The length of any issue of The Sentinel is dependent upon the number of advertisements purchased and articles written for a given week. The paper is organized into four sections:

- News (Includes the Police Beat, Student Government Association Beat, Owl Events Calendar, and weekly news.)
- Opinion (Includes editorials, an editorial cartoon, op-eds, and letters to the editor.)
- Arts and Living (Includes reviews of music, movies, performance arts, and video games.)
- Sports (Includes summaries of recent KSU Athletics' games and sports features.)
