= Invitation =

Invitation or The Invitation may refer to:

== Films ==
- Invitation (1952 film), an MGM film starring Dorothy McGuire and Van Johnson
- The Invitation (1973 film), a Swiss film
- The Invitation (2003 film), an American film starring Lance Henriksen
- Invitation (2008 film), an Iranian film by Ebrahim Hatamikia
- The Invitation (2015 film), an American horror film
- The Invitation (2022 film), an American horror film

== Television ==
- "The Invitation" (Daria episode), a 1997 episode
- "The Invitation", a 2015 episode of Lego Ninjago: Masters of Spinjitzu
- "The Invitation", a 2017 episode of "Islands" from Adventure Time
- "Invitations" (Hotel Portofino), a 2022 episode
- "Invitation" (King & Conquerer), a 2025 episode

== Music ==
=== Albums ===
- Invitation (Milt Jackson album), 1962
- Invitation (Andrew Hill album), 1974
- Invitation (Joanne Brackeen album), 1976
- Invitation (Norman Connors album), 1979
- Invitation (Kenny Barron album), 1991
- Invitation (Billy Bang album), 1982
- Invitation (Jaco Pastorius album), 1983
- Invitation (Joe Sample album), 1993
- Invitation (Altaria album), 2003
- Invitation (EP), a 2012 EP by Ailee
- The Invitation (Thirteen Senses album), 2008
- The Invitation (Meredith Andrews album), 2004
- Invitation (Filthy Friends album), 2017
- Invitation (UP10TION album), 2018
- Invitation (Carrie Akre album)
- An Invitation, an Inara George album, 2008

=== Songs ===
- "Invitation" (song), theme music for the 1952 film by Bronislaw Kaper which has become a jazz standard
- "Invitation", a song by Status Quo from the 1986 album In the Army Now
- "An Invitation", a 2014 song by Lena Katina
- "The Invitation", a song by The Black Heart Procession from their 2002 album Amore del Tropico
- "Invitation", a song by Blue from their 2002 album One Love
- "Invitation", a song by Dannii Minogue from her 2007 album Unleashed
- "Invitation", a 2018 song by Ashnikko featuring Kodie Shane from Unlikeable
- "Invitation", a 2019 diss track by Nick Cannon; see Lord Above

== Other uses ==
- The Invitation (ballet), a one-act ballet by Kenneth MacMillan

== See also ==
- Invitational (disambiguation)
- Wedding invitation, an invitation to a wedding, often an ornate greeting card
