= Microteaching =

Teacher training technique

Micro-teaching is a teacher training and faculty development technique whereby the teacher reviews a recording of a teaching session, in order to get constructive feedback from peers or students about what has worked and what improvements can be made to their teaching technique. Micro-teaching was invented in 1963 at Stanford University by Dwight W. Allen, and has subsequently been used to develop educators in all forms of education.

In the original process, a teacher was asked to prepare a short lesson (usually 20 minutes) for a small group of learners. This was then recorded on video. After the lesson, the teacher, teaching colleagues, a master teacher and the students together viewed the videotape and commented on what they saw happening, referencing the teacher's teaching objectives. Watching the video and getting comments from colleagues and students provide teachers with an often intense "under the microscope" view of their teaching.

A review of the evidence for micro-teaching, undertaken by John Hattie as part of his visible learning project, found it was the 6th most effective method for improving student outcomes.

== Techniques ==
Since its inception in 1963, micro-teaching has become an established teacher-training procedure in many universities and school districts. This training procedure is geared towards simplification of the complexities of the regular teaching-learning process. Class size, time, task, and content are scaled down to provide optimal training environments. The supervisor demonstrates the skill to be practiced. This may be live demonstration, or a video presentation of the skill. Then, the group members select a topic and prepare a lesson of five to ten minutes. The teacher trainee then has the opportunity to practice and evaluate his use of the skills. Practice takes the form of a ten-minute micro-teaching session in which five to ten pupils are involved.

In more recent years, the easy availability of recording equipment and the use of social media for dissemination have made micro-teaching more accessible.

== Feedback ==
Feedback in micro-teaching is critical for teacher-trainee improvement. It is the information that a student receives concerning their attempts to imitate certain patterns of teaching. The built-in feedback mechanism in micro-teaching acquaints the trainee with the success of their performance and enables them to evaluate and to improve teaching.

== See also ==
- Evidence-based education
