= Viviane Robinson =

New Zealand educational psychologist

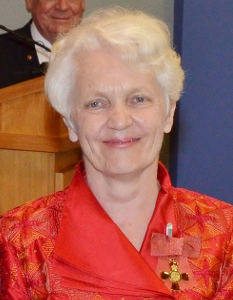
- Robinson after her investiture in the Order of New Zealand Merit in 2014
- Born: Viviane Marcelle Joan Robinson
- Citizenship: New Zealand
- Education: Harvard University
- Awards: Mason Durie Award
- Scientific career
- Fields: leadership and education
- Workplaces: University of Auckland
- Thesis: The behavior of caregivers: the example of clinical teams (1976)

Viviane Marcelle Joan Robinson ONZM is an emeritus distinguished professor at the University of Auckland, specialising in organisational and educational psychology.

== Academic career ==
After a PhD titled The behavior of caregivers: the example of clinical teams at Harvard University, completed in 1976, Robinson moved to the University of Auckland. She was appointed a Distinguished Professor in 2012.

Robinson has published extensively on school improvement and leadership. She worked to reduce the gap between research and practice in education, believing that the gap often resulted from the methodology chosen by researchers. Her book "Reduce Change to Increase Improvement" was designed to encourage educational leaders to stop thinking that innovation and change would always lead to improvement in educational outcomes. It has been translated into three languages.

As the academic director for the Centre for Educational Leadership for eight years, Robinson was instrumental in the delivery of a New Zealand-wide induction programme for new school leaders. Robinson has consulted on leadership development and research to government agencies and organisations internationally, including in Sweden, Denmark, Norway, England, Singapore, Chile, Canada and Australia.

She retired in June 2018, having published five books, 88 peer-reviewed papers, and 37 book chapters. At the time of her retirement, her colleagues said "very few scholars globally would have had a greater impact on educational leadership scholarship, policy and practice than Viviane. She has shifted educational thinking, contributed enormously to school improvement, and, in so doing, changed lives and enhanced communities."

== Honours and awards ==
Robinson was appointed a Fellow of the American Educational Research Association in 2011, and was made an Officer of the New Zealand Order of Merit in 2014, for services to education. Robinson was awarded the Mason Durie medal in 2016, and was made a Fellow of the Royal Society Te Apārangi in 2017. In 2017 Robinson was selected as one of the Royal Society Te Apārangi's 150 women in 150 words.

== Selected works ==
- Viviane Robinson (2018). Reduce change to increase improvement (in undetermined language). Thousand Oaks: Corwin Press. ISBN 978-1-5063-2537-8. OCLC 1027572121. OL 27412145M. Wikidata Q104937277.
- V. M Robinson; Mei Kuin Lai (2006), Practitioner research for educators: a guide to improving classrooms and schools (in undetermined language), Thousand Oaks: Corwin Press, OCLC 60189368, Wikidata Q104931620
- M I Cameron; V M Robinson (1 September 1980). "Effects of cognitive training on academic and on-task behavior of hyperactive children". Research on Child and Adolescent Psychopathology. 8 (3): 405–419. doi:10.1007/bf00916384. ISSN 0091-0627. PMID 7410738. Wikidata Q49150076.
- Michael Peters; Viviane Robinson (April 1984). "The Origins and Status of Action Research". The Journal of Applied Behavioral Science. 20 (2): 113–124. doi:10.1177/002188638402000203. ISSN 0021-8863. Wikidata Q57812341.
- Claire E. L. Sinnema; Viviane M. J. Robinson; Larry Ludlow; Denyse Pope (7 January 2015). "How effective is the principal? Discrepancy between New Zealand teachers' and principals' perceptions of principal effectiveness". Educational Assessment, Evaluation and Accountability. 27 (3): 275–301. doi:10.1007/s11092-014-9209-y. ISSN 1874-8597. Wikidata Q104929697.
- Deidre M. Le Fevre; Viviane M.J. Robinson; Claire E.L. Sinnema (27 October 2014). "Genuine inquiry". Educational Management Administration & Leadership. 43 (6): 883–899. doi:10.1177/1741143214543204. ISSN 1741-1432. Wikidata Q104929706.
- Deidre M. Le Fevre; Viviane M. J. Robinson (7 April 2014). "The Interpersonal Challenges of Instructional Leadership". Educational Administration Quarterly. 51 (1): 58–95. doi:10.1177/0013161x13518218. ISSN 0013-161X. Wikidata Q104929709.
- Viviane M. J. Robinson; Claire E. L. Sinnema; Deidre Le Fevre (3 July 2014). "From Persuasion to Learning: An Intervention to Improve Leaders' Response to Disagreement". Leadership and Policy in Schools. 13 (3): 260–296. doi:10.1080/15700763.2014.922997. ISSN 1570-0763. Wikidata Q104929710.
- V. M Robinson (2011). Student-centered leadership. San Francisco: Jossey-Bass. ISBN 978-0-470-87413-4. LCCN 2011011789. OCLC 955342998. OL 24847523M. Wikidata Q104930007.
- V. M Robinson; Michael Absolum; Carol Cardno; Tony Steele (1990), Leadership for tomorrow's schools, Wellington: Ministry of Education, OCLC 154648945, Wikidata Q104930009
- V. M Robinson; Deidre Le Fevre; Claire E. L Sinnema (2016). Open-to-learning leadership: how to build trust while tackling tough issues (in undetermined language). Moorabbin: Hawker Brownlow Education. ISBN 978-1-76001-995-2. OCLC 973299878. Wikidata Q104930011.
