= Scholarship of teaching and learning =

Study of post-secondary teaching

The scholarship of teaching and learning (SOTL or SoTL) is often defined as systematic inquiry into student learning which advances the practice of teaching in higher education by making inquiry findings public. Building on this definition, Peter Felten identified 5 principles for good practice in SOTL: (1) inquiry focused on student learning, (2) grounded in context, (3) methodologically sound, (4) conducted in partnership with students, (5) appropriately public.

SOTL necessarily builds on many past traditions in higher education, including classroom and program assessment, action research, the reflective practice movement, peer review of teaching, traditional educational research, and faculty development efforts to enhance teaching and learning. As such, SOTL encompasses aspects of professional development or faculty development, such as how teachers can not only improve their expertise in their fields, but also develop their pedagogical expertise, i.e., how to better teach novice students in the field or enable their learning. It also encompasses the study and implementation of more modern teaching methods, such as active learning, cooperative learning, problem based learning, and others. SOTL scholars come from various backgrounds, such as those in educational psychology and other education related fields, as well as specialists in various disciplines who are interested in improving teaching and learning in their respective fields. Some scholars are educational researchers or consultants affiliated with teaching and learning centers at universities.

Inquiry methods in SOTL include reflection and analysis, interviews and focus groups, questionnaires and surveys, content analysis of text, secondary analysis of existing data, quasi-experiments (comparison of two sections of the same course), observational research, and case studies, among others. As with all scholarly study, evidence depends not only upon the methods chosen but the relevant disciplinary standards. Dissemination for impact among scholarly teachers may be local within the academic department, college or university, or may be in published, peer-reviewed form. A few journals exclusively publish SOTL outputs, and numerous disciplinary publications disseminate such inquiry outputs (e.g., J. Chem. Educ., J. Natural Resour. Life Sci. Educ., Research in the Teaching of English, College English, J. Economic Education), as well as a number of core SoTL journals and newsletters.

== Related frameworks ==
Related to SoTL are Discipline-Based Educational Research (DBER) and Decoding the Disciplines. DBER differs from the more general SoTL concept in that it is closely linked to specific subject areas, such as physics or mathematics. This is often reflected in very subject-specific questions, and actors in this research area also often have a subject background rather than a pedagogical one.

Closely related to SoTL is also the Decoding the Disciplines approach, which aims more at making the tacit knowledge of experts explicit and helping students master mental actions.

== Signature pedagogies ==
Signature pedagogies are ways of learning in specific disciplines. Examples of signature pedagogies include medical residents making rounds in hospitals or pre-service teachers doing a classroom-based practicum as part of their teacher training. The notion of signature pedagogies has expanded in recent years, as scholars have examined their use in e-learning, for example. Some scholars contend that SoTL itself is a signature pedagogy of higher education.

== 4M framework ==
It has been suggested that the role of SoTL is evolving, but there remains a need to demonstrate the impact of efforts to promote the impact of SoTL within higher education. The 4M framework is used in SoTL to understand complex problems relating to teaching and learning. The framework grew out of systems theory and has been adapted for used in educational settings. The framework includes four levels through which complex problems can be studied: micro (individual), meso (departmental), macro (institutional), and mega. Changes at the meso-level and beyond can have the most impact over time. The framework has been proposed as a means to engage in strategic planning and institutional reporting of SoTL activities.

== Professional societies ==
The International Society for Exploring Teaching and Learning (ISETL) has as its purpose "to encourage the study of instruction and principles of learning in order to implement practical, effective methods of teaching and learning; promote the application, development, and evaluation of such methods; and foster the scholarship of teaching and learning among practicing post-secondary educators." They hold a yearly conference in varying locations. Their 50th annual conference was to be held in Charlotte, NC in 2019.

The International Society for the Scholarship of Teaching & Learning (ISSOTL) was founded in 2004 by a committee of 67 scholars from several countries and serves faculty members, staff, and students who care about teaching and learning as serious intellectual work. ISSOTL has held annual conferences since 2004, attended by scholars from about a dozen nations. The conferences sites include Bloomington, Indiana (2004, 2009); Vancouver, British Columbia (2005); Washington, D.C. (2006); Sydney (2007); Edmonton, Alberta (2008); Liverpool (2010); Milwaukee, Wisconsin (2011); Hamilton, Ontario (2012); Raleigh, North Carolina (2013); and Quebec City (2014).

There are also stand-alone conferences that have a long-standing commitment to SOTL. The Lilly Conferences are a series of conferences that occur multiple times a year and provide "opportunities for the presentation of the scholarship of teaching and learning." Additionally, The SoTL Commons Conference is an international conference that has been held since 2007 at the Georgia Southern University Center for Teaching Excellence (CTE).

== Criticism and limitations of SoTL ==
Some writers have been critical of SoTL as lacking focus and definition with a lack of clarity on the differences between SoTL and educational research undertaken in tertiary education. It is also argued that SoTL has become too broad in definition and is conflated with non-evidenced based teaching interventions and innovations. Bruce Macfarlane claims SoTL damages the reputation of educational research, reinforcing a long-standing notion that educational research is of lower status compared to discipline-based research.

== List of journals focusing on SOTL topics ==
- The Canadian Journal for the Scholarship of Teaching and Learning
- College Teaching
- International Journal for Academic Development
- International Journal for the Scholarship of Teaching and Learning (IJ-SOTL)
- International Journal for Students as Partners (IJSaP)
- International Journal of Teaching and Learning in Higher Education (IJTLHE)
- Journal of Effective Teaching in Higher Education (Formerly Journal of Effective Teaching)
- Journal of the Scholarship of Teaching and Learning
- Journal on Excellence in College Teaching
- Teaching & Learning Inquiry (TLI)

== See also ==
- Education research
- Education science
- National Survey of Student Engagement
- Pedagogy

== Bibliography ==
- Bass, R. 1999. "The scholarship of teaching: What is the problem?" Creative Thinking about Learning and Teaching 1(1). online – online
- Boyer, E. L. (1990), Scholarship reconsidered: Priorities of the professoriate. (PDF), Carnegie Foundation for the Advancement of Teaching http://www.hadinur.com/paper/BoyerScholarshipReconsidered.pdf
- Huber, M.T., and P. Hutchings. 2005. "Surveying the scholarship of teaching and learning", Chap. 1, The Advancement of Learning: Building the Teaching Commons, (ISBN 0-7879-8115-X)
- Hutchings, P. 2000. "Approaching the scholarship of teaching and learning" (Introduction to Opening Lines: Approaches to the Scholarship of Teaching and Learning; ISBN 0-931050-68-5) online
- Kreber, C. 2002. "Teaching excellence, teaching expertise, and the scholarship of teaching" Innovative Higher Educ. 27:5–23.
- McKinney, K. 2004. "The scholarship of teaching and learning: Past lessons, current challenges, and future visions." To Improve the Academy 22:3–19.
- Shulman, L.S. 1999. "Taking learning seriously" Change July/August 1999:11–17.
