= Dwight W. Allen =

American educationalist (1931–2021)

- Born: August 1, 1931
- Died: October 16, 2021 (aged 90)
- Education: B.A. Stanford University M.A. Stanford University Ed. D. Stanford University
- Occupations: Professor, Eminent Scholar of Educational Reform, Author
- Website: Dwight William Allen Papers

Dwight W. Allen (August 1, 1931 – October 16, 2021) was a professor of education, eminent scholar, and lifelong education reformist. He served as a professor and Director of Teacher Education at his alma mater, the Stanford Graduate School of Education from 1959 to 1967. He was Dean of the College of Education, University of Massachusetts, Amherst, from 1968 to 1975. In 1978, Allen became a professor of Education and Eminent Scholar of Educational Reform at Old Dominion University in Virginia. Allen retired from Old Dominion University in July 2008.

Allen was the author of nine books on educational reform and teacher education, including one book co-authored with former student, Bill Cosby. He has consulted with the Bill and Melinda Gates Foundation to help devise strategies to bring better information to smallholder farmers in South Asia and Africa.

Allen died on October 16, 2021, at the age of 90.

== Education ==
Allen earned his B.A. (1953), M.A. (1957), and Ed.D. (1959) degrees from Stanford University.

== Initiatives and achievements in education reform ==
Since his Stanford days as a graduate student and later as a faculty member, Allen was committed to integrating technology into teaching and learning and to extensive education reform. In Stanford, he developed the first computer based school scheduling system and microteaching, which is a teacher training practicum that has been used worldwide ever since then.

When he became the Dean of Education at the University of Massachusetts Amherst, in 1968, Allen contended with the status quo and worked to combat institutional racism. He allowed students to create their own programs and abolished the traditional grading system. The college of education recruited non-traditional students and students of color, such as the then nationally famous comedian Bill Cosby, for their doctoral programs, Doctoral students were made voting members of the faculty and participated fully in the governance of the college of education. Allen argues that the career achievements of the doctoral programs' graduates have vindicated his radical reforms.

Allen has worked toward educational reform worldwide. In Lesotho he served as Founding Chief Technical Advisor for the National Teacher Training College (1974–76). In Botswana he served as Technical Advisor to the Molepolole College of Education (1986–89). In Greece, he served as Professor at the Kollegion Athenon (1953–54). In China, he served as Consultant to the United Nations Development Programme Project and focused on educational reform and teacher training (1991–2009). He has consulted on educational reform in more than 50 countries.

As a lifelong educational technology advocate, Allen himself served as an exemplar for the integration of technology in teaching and learning in his own instructional work. He believes "Education needs dot-com leaders desperately".

Allen proposed many new education reform initiatives in his co-authored book with Bill Cosby: American School: The 100 Billion Dollar Challenge. These initiatives range from establishing a national school reform experimentation system (NESA: the National Experimental Schools Administration) to merit pay for teachers. Allen and Cosby also proposed year-round school, 15-hour school days, strong community involvement in schools, professional discretion, professional incentives, and integration of technology.

Both Allen and Cosby view education as a fundamental aspect of national defense. They argue that we need to invest in education at similar levels to our military.

== Microteaching ==
Microteaching was developed in the early and mid 1960s by Allen and his colleagues at the Stanford Teacher Education Program. It was designed to enhance teaching via open collegial discussion about teaching performance. The original Stanford model took a “teach → review & reflect → re-teach approach”, using actual school students as an authentic audience. The model has been adapted to college and university teacher training programs where it has been used most often to elicit a concentrated, focused form of peer feedback. The rationale of Microteaching is to apply collegial constructive criticisms to improve one's own teaching/learning strategies and, through assuming the student role, to sharpen one's insight into students' teaching/learning needs and expectations.

The core of microteaching is the presentation of two 10-minute micro lessons by each participant. When one participant presents a lesson as an instructor, the other participants become students for that lesson. A timer is used to keep to the STRICTLY ENFORCED 10-minute time limit so that everyone can participate fully. Because of the strict time limit, it is impossible and unnecessary to cram an entire body of knowledge into 10 minutes; the 10-minute lesson can be excerpted from the beginning, middle or end of one lesson. This is designed to provide a snapshot of the teaching method or style of a participant in order to get a fresh perspectives on it from peers. Originally, a micro lesson was video-taped so that the presenter could review it and reflect on it after the presentation. Other participants also would review the tape and provide their feedback on the presentation. Based on his/her own reflections and peers' feedback on the micro lesson, the presenter would re-teach the same 10-minute lesson.

Years ago, Allen simplified the process of microteaching by incorporating the 2+2 performance appraisal system. The new microteaching model doesn't require video-taping the presentation. Participants are divided into small groups. When one group member does the presentation, other group members act as his/her students. After the presentation, these "students" provide feedback (oral or written) for the "teacher" on the lesson which includes 2 compliments and 2 suggestions (2+2). Based on his/her own reflections and peers' feedback, the presenter would re-teach the same micro lesson.

A micro lesson is an opportunity to present a sample “snapshot” of what/how a participant (teacher or pre-teacher) teaches and to get different feedback from colleagues/peers about how it was received. For half a century, microteaching has been used widely in many teacher training programs in many countries, and it has been proven to be an effective approach in preparing and training effective teachers.

== 2+2 performance appraisal system ==
A fundamental principle of human motivation is the importance of feedback. 2+2 is an observation protocol for providing motivational feedback. It can be used any time it is desirable to have a formal and systematic record of observation on one hand, or casual and informal feedback at the request of an individual who feels he or she needs some feedback in a given area on the other. 2+2 was initially developed as an alternative to more formal, elaborate evaluation visits, but is now used in much broader contexts, essentially whenever it is desirable to provide feedback based on observation.

2+2 involves the giving of 2 compliments and 2 suggestions to a colleague (senior, junior or peer) based on the observations of a person's behavior or performance. The observer is asked to identify and record the most important compliments and suggestions for improvement based on an observation session (which may last for as little as several minutes or as long as several days). There are five "Secrets" of 2+2 effective feedback: balance, specific, timely, focused, and with follow-up.

2+2 is designed to benefit both the observer and the observed. When 2+2 is successful, observation is viewed positively by all who participate, a major advantage over traditional evaluation. All are encouraged to be free in giving and receiving comments. If those observed are assured that all comments are for their benefit and that they are free to take the suggestions or ignore them, suggestions for improvement are most likely to be seriously considered.

Feedback and encouragement are the grist of learning and behavior change. 2+2 is a performance appraisal system which, in itself, can be motivational and encourage better performance.

== Distinguished students ==
Bill Cosby was an Ed.D. student when Allen was the Dean of College of Education at UMASS Amherst in the 1960s. The professor and student relationship continued ever since. They are frequently collaborators on research and writing projects. They co-authored a book in 2000: American Schools: The $100 Billion Challenge

Cynthia Shepard Perry received her Doctorate in Education in UMASS Amherst in 1972. Later on, she became a full Professor and Dean of International Affairs in Texas Southern University, and then she was appointed United States Ambassador to Sierre Leone, and later served as Ambassador to Burundi. Perry was the chief of education and human resources in the African Bureau of the U.S. Agency for International Development and the U.S. director of the African Development Bank.

Dr. Chis Dede received his Ed.D. degree from the University of Massachusetts, Amherst. He is now a professor in the Graduate School of Education, Harvard University. Dede is involved in research areas such as information technology and human learning capacities.

Steven Gluckstern, recently retired as an executive, entrepreneur, investor, philanthropist, and educator, received his Ed.D. from UMASS Amherst in 1974. He gave $1.7 million for two professorships, and Allen was appointed to one of them. This was the first endowed professorship in Education at the University of Massachusetts, Amherst.

Another of Allen's students was Chris Daggett, who has strong interest in education reform. Daggett went to the University of Massachusetts, where he received a Doctor of Education degree in 1977 when Allen was Dean of Education. Daggett ran for Governor of New Jersey as an independent candidate in 2009.

== Accomplishments at Old Dominion University ==
Allen has served Old Dominion University as University Professor of Education, University Professor of Arts and Letters and Eminent Scholar of Educational Reform from 1978 to 2008. During his tenure in ODU, Allen acted as principal investigator for a $1.3 million grant to improve the technology training of teachers—The ACTTNOW (Aligning Credentialing with Teacher Training Now).

He was the founding coordinator of NewPAGE, ODU's environmental education class, required for more than 2,000 freshmen for four years.

During 2007–2008, he has been researching strategies for student-written textbooks and other Web 2.0 initiatives.

== Work with international organizations ==
Allen has served as consultant and advisor as many international organizations including the United Nations Development Program (UNDP), the United Nations Educational, Scientific and Cultural Organization (UNESCO), and the World Bank Group.

=== UNDP ===
In 1986 and 1987, he served as a consultant for UNDP project coordinator for Donors' Conference for the Rehabilitation of Makerere, University at Kampala in Uganda. In 1992, he served as Technical Advisor UNDP Education Mission to China. From 1993 and 1998, he served as Chief Technical Advisor for a UNDP project in China called “Basic Education: Teacher Education and Education Administration CPR 91/420”. From 1998 to 2001, he served as International Technical Advisor for a UNDP project China entitled “UNDP/CPR/96/401: Improving Nine-Year Compulsory Education in Poor Areas: Focusing on Girls”. From 2002 to 2007, he served as International Technical Advisor for a UNDP project in China called “UNDP/CPR/01/403: Using Distance Education and ICT to Improve Teacher Quality in Poor Areas of Western China”.

=== UNESCO ===
From 1974 to 1976, Allen served as Chief Technical Advisor for a UNESCO project in Lesotho National Teacher Training College, Maseru, Lesotho, Southern Africa. In 1990, he served as co-director for Project IF, A drug education project funded by the U.S. Department of Education Technical Advisor, UNESCO, Malawi (Africa) Primary Teacher Education Project. In 1993, he served as Technical Advisor in Teacher Education sponsored by UNESCO for Wuhan Institute of Education, Wuhan, China. From 1993 to 1995, he served as Technical Advisor for a UNESCO project in Namibia called “In-Service Teacher Education Project”.

=== World Bank ===
He also served as Technical Advisor in Teacher Education sponsored by the World Bank for a China project in Shanxi Institute of Education, Taiyuan in 1991 and in Hunan Institute of Education, Changsha in 1993.

== In China ==
Allen, American Eminent Scholar of Educational Reform, has served as a chief technical adviser and consultant to many Chinese educational programs sponsored by the United Nations or the World Bank since 1991, having helped prepare and train thousands of school teachers and education administrators in urban and rural China.

On his 44 visits to China, Allen showed great concerns and interests in Chinese educational issues. He made significant contributions to various educational programs and technology improvement in elementary and secondary schools.

=== Involvement in teacher training programs in Shanxi Province, China ===
Allen first came to Shanxi in 1991 as a Technical Advisor under the UNDP Education Mission to China. He held a month-long workshop on education reform in Taiyuan, which was the first of his 44 visits to China. He came to Taiyuan again in 1992, introducing microteaching to Shanxi educators. After that, he revisited Shanxi a few more times to follow up with microteaching progress. In 2008 and 2009, invited by Taiyuan Education Bureau, Jincheng Education Bureau, and Jincheng Technical & Vocational College, Allen came to Taiyuan and Jincheng to help with a teacher appraisal system focusing on 2+2, an assessment system developed by Allen.

== Writings ==
- Dwight Allen (1992) Schools for a New Century: A Conservative Approach to Radical School Reform
- Bill Cosby & Dwight Allen (2000) American Schools: The $100 Billion Challenge
- Dwight Allen, Patrick M. O'Shea, & Peter Baker (2007) The Social and Cultural Foundations of American Education
- Dwight Allen (2004) "The University of Massachusetts Amherst School of Education: A Successful Experiment in Combating Institutional Racism"
