= Visible learning =

2008 meta-study by John Hattie

Visible learning is a meta-study that analyzes effect sizes of measurable influences on learning outcomes in educational settings. It was published by John Hattie in 2008 and draws upon results from 815 other meta-analyses. The Times Educational Supplement described Hattie's meta-study as "teaching's holy grail".

Hattie compared the effect sizes of influences on learning outcomes - in particular by using Cohen's d as a measure. He points out that in education most things work. The question is which strategies and innovations work best and where to concentrate efforts in order to improve student achievement.

Hattie found that the aspects most correlated with student achievement were:

1. Self-reported grades (d=1.44): correlation between self-assessment and actual grades
2. Piagetian programs (d=1.28): correlation between Piagetian stage and achievement
3. Providing formative evaluation of programs (d=0.90)
4. Microteaching (d=0.88)
5. Acceleration (d=0.88)
6. Classroom behavioral (d=0.80)
7. Interventions for learning disabled students (d=0.77)
8. Teacher clarity (d=0.75)
9. Reciprocal teaching (d=0.74)
10. Feedback (d=0.73)
11. Teacher-student relationships (d=0.72)
12. Spaced vs. mass practice (d=0.71)
13. Meta-cognitive strategies (d=0.69)
14. Prior achievement (d=0.67)
15. Reading: vocabulary programs (d=0.67)
16. Reading: repeated reading programs (d=0.67)

Some of the statistical methods used by Hattie have been criticised. Hattie himself admitted that the values for the Common language effect size (CLE) in Visible Learning were calculated incorrectly throughout the book, with only the values for cohen's d being correct.

In 2014, Rolf Schulmeister and Jörn Loviscach pointed out "considerable issues in terms of the selection of studies and the methods employed" in the meta analysis. Amongst others, they criticize the use of questionable or wrongly-categorized studies and misleading or nonsensical statistics.

The phrase "visible learning" was used previously by Howard Gardner in his 2001 study "Making Learning Visible" as Inez De Florio argued in 2016.
