= Randall Bass =

American academic and English professor

Randall (Randy) Bass is an American professor of English and the Vice Provost for Undergraduate Education at Georgetown University. He is a prominent figure in the scholarship of teaching and learning (SoTL) and digital pedagogy.

== Education and career ==
Bass serves as the Executive Director of the Center for New Designs in Learning and Scholarship (CNDLS) at Georgetown. He has been a featured fellow at the Carnegie Foundation for the Advancement of Teaching and served as a Consulting Scholar for the foundation from 2003 to 2009.

In 1999, he was awarded the EDUCAUSE Medal for Outstanding Achievement in Technology and Undergraduate Education.

== Selected works ==
- Border Texts: Cultural Readings for Contemporary Writers (Houghton Mifflin, 1999) ISBN 978-0-395-67728-5
- Beyond Borders: A Cultural Reader (Houghton Mifflin, 2002) ISBN 978-0-618-23497-4
- "The Middle of Open Spaces" in Opening Up Education (MIT Press, 2008) ISBN 978-0-262-03371-8
- "Disrupting Ourselves: The Problem of Learning in Higher Education" (2012) in EDUCAUSE Review.
- "What's the Problem Now?" (2020) in To Improve the Academy: A Journal of Educational Development.
