= Kennesaw State University =

Public university in Cobb County, Georgia, US

- Former names: Kennesaw Junior College (1966–1976); Kennesaw College (1976–1988); Kennesaw State College (1988–1996); Southern Polytechnic State University (merged 2015)
- Motto: "Wisdom, Justice, Moderation"
- Type: Public research university
- Established: October 9, 1963; 63 years ago
- Parent institution: University System of Georgia
- Accreditation: SACS
- Academic affiliations: Space-grant
- Endowment: $133.1 million (2025)
- President: Kathy Schwaig
- Provost: Ivan Pulinkala
- Academic staff: 1,004
- Administrative staff: 2,000
- Students: 51,375 (fall 2025)
- Undergraduates: 46,069 (fall 2025)
- Postgraduates: 5,306 (fall 2025)
- Location: Kennesaw, Georgia, United States; 34.038°N 84.583°W
- Campus: 581 acres (2.35 km^{2}); Large suburb
- Newspaper: The Sentinel
- Colors: Black and gold
- Nickname: Owls
- Sporting affiliations: NCAA Division I FBS – CUSA
- Mascot: Scrappy the Owl
- Website: kennesaw.edu

Kennesaw State University (KSU) is a public research university in the U.S. state of Georgia with two campuses in the Atlanta metropolitan area, one in the Kennesaw area and the other in Marietta on a combined 581 acres (235 ha) of land. The school was founded in 1963 by the Georgia Board of Regents using local bonds and a federal space-grant during a time of major Georgia economic expansion after World War II. KSU also holds classes at the Cobb Galleria Centre, Dalton State College, and in Paulding County (Dallas). The total enrollment exceeds 51,000 students making KSU the third-largest university by enrollment in Georgia.

KSU is part of the University System of Georgia and is classified among "Research 2: High Research Spending and Doctorate Production". Kennesaw State's athletic teams are an NCAA Division I member of the Conference USA.

== History ==
=== Establishment in 1963 until 1975 ===
KSU was chartered by the Board of Regents on October 9, 1963, during one of the most dramatic periods of college expansion in Georgia's history. The university was officially founded by the Georgia Board of Regents approved the establishment of a junior college tentatively to be named Cobb County Junior College. In December 1964, Horace Sturgis was designated to serve as the future college's first president. When the school opened in the fall of 1966, it was named Kennesaw Junior College and had an initial enrollment of 1,014 students.

=== Early years as Kennesaw College, 1976–1995 ===
Thirteen years later, in 1976, the former Kennesaw Junior College became a four-year college and was redesignated Kennesaw College. Betty Siegel became the second president of Kennesaw College in 1981, and the first female university president in the University System of Georgia.

By 1985, KSU had initiated its first graduate degree programs, in business and education, and began a period of rapid growth, including building some residential housing. Finally, in 1988, the former Kennesaw College was renamed Kennesaw State College and associate degrees were discontinued, except in nursing.

=== Becoming a major university ===
Kennesaw State finally achieved University status in 1996. The Kennesaw State's baseball and softball teams won the NCAA Division II national championships in 1996. The winning Owls continued excelling in athletics, including the Lady Owls 2003 win of the NCAA Women's Division II Soccer Championship and the men's basketball team win of the 2004 NCAA Men's Division II Basketball Championship. In part due to their winning Division II in 2005, the Owls joined Division I and the Atlantic Sun Conference.

In 2004, KSU was recognized by the Department of Homeland Security and the National Security Agency as a National Center of Academic Excellence in Information Assurance Education. At the time, this placed KSU among 67 other institutions recognized as CAE/IAEs with this recognition. KSU was recognized again in 2007.

In the summer of 2006, Daniel S. Papp became the university's third president.

KSU also began its first doctoral programs in Education in Leadership for Learning, Education, and a doctorate of Business Administration.

On November 1, 2013, the University System of Georgia announced that Kennesaw State University would merge with nearby Southern Polytechnic State University in 2015. Kennesaw State would be the surviving institution, with President Papp serving as president of the merged university. Southern Polytechnic was started by the president of the Georgia Institute of Technology, Blake R. Van Leer who was known for making Atlanta the "MIT of the South." On January 6, 2015, the Georgia Board of Regents of the University System of Georgia approved the consolidation of Southern Polytechnic State and Kennesaw State. In honor of SPSU's legacy, Kennesaw State established Southern Polytechnic College of Engineering and Engineering Technology as one of its 11 colleges.

On January 1, 2015, Kennesaw State University was classified by the Carnegie Foundation for Teaching and Learning as a Community Engaged Institution.

In the Fall of 2016, students and faculty protested the suspected appointment of Georgia's Republican attorney general, Sam Olens, as the next Kennesaw president. He took office on November 1, 2016, resigning as attorney general. He left office in February of 2018. Pamela Whitten was KSU's next president, serving until 2021. On March 16, 2022, Kathy Schwaig was named the sixth president.

KSU's Computer Science and Information Systems department hosts the Center for Election Systems, which certified and monitored the direct recording electronic machines used in Georgia elections until June 2018 at the latest. This shift was initiated due in part to poor security by the center, which had accidentally exposed over 6.5 million voter records.

On December 19, 2018, KSU was classified as a doctoral research institution with R2 status, denoting high research activity.

== Campuses ==
Kennesaw State University is located on two campuses with a combined 581 acres (235 ha) of land, of which about 251 acres is in Kennesaw and the remainder in Marietta. The Kennesaw campus is located adjacent to I-75.

=== Kennesaw Campus ===
==== Social Sciences Building ====
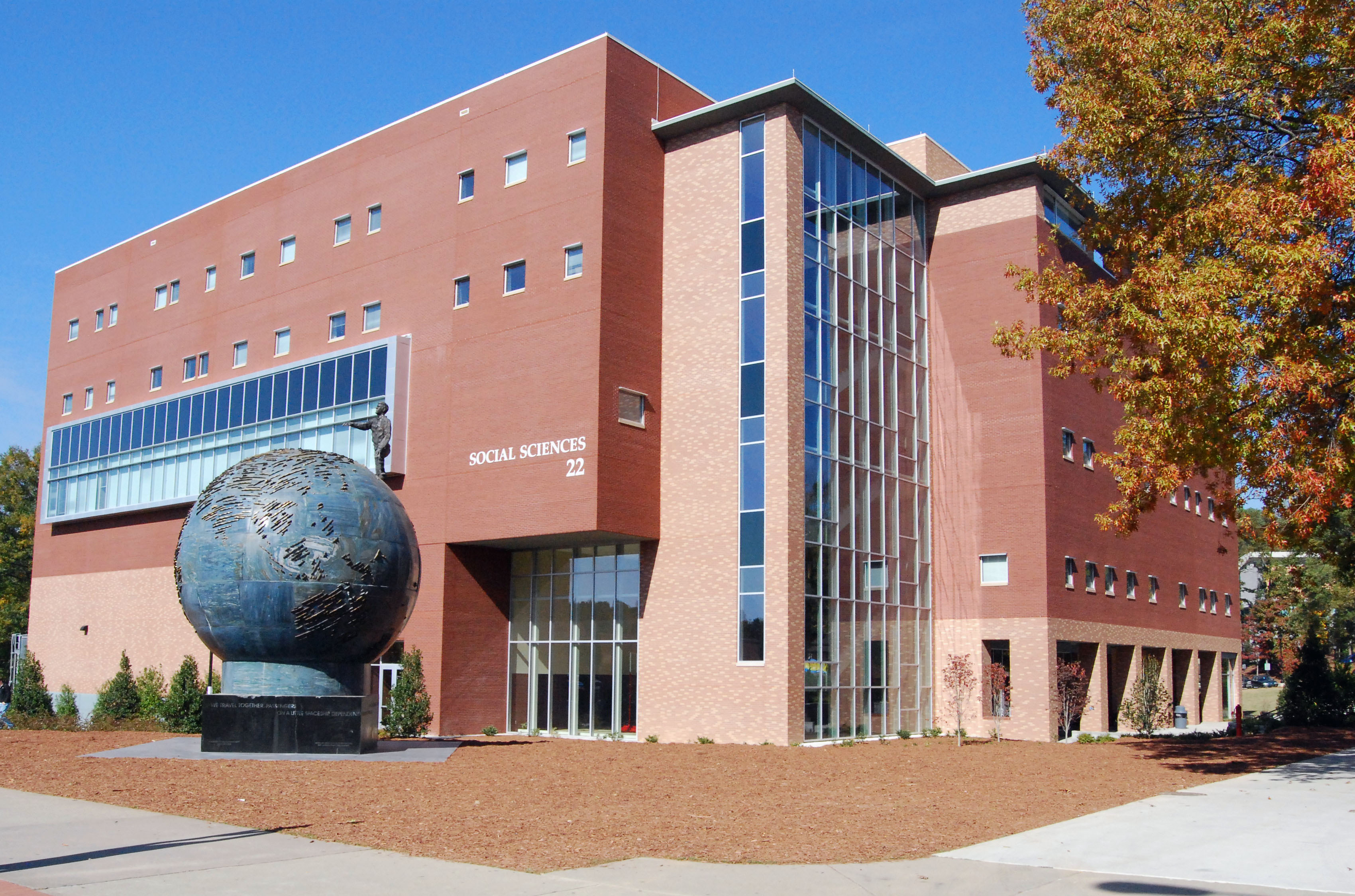
The Social Sciences Building and the Spaceship Earth sculpture

The Social Sciences building is located on the west section of campus on Campus Loop Road adjacent to the original campus historical district. The 163,000-square-foot (15,100 m^{2}) building features a 302-seat auditorium, a 100+ seat cinema classroom, a digital media lab, and 40 classrooms with advanced technology. The lobby features a Starbucks and study area. The Social Sciences building also meets Silver Rating LEED Green Building requirements and is the first building in the University System of Georgia to meet these specifications. In 2020, after the donation of a $9 million gift to the school by Norman and Lindy Radow, the College of Humanities and Social Sciences was renamed the Norman J. Radow College of Humanities and Social Sciences.

==== Spaceship Earth ====
Located adjacent to the Social Sciences Building was a 350,000-pound (160,000 kg) sculpture entitled "Spaceship Earth", created by Finnish American artist Eino. The sculpture was commissioned by the Maxwell Family Foundation in memory of the late environmentalist David Brower. The sculpture was intended to be a permanent reminder to future generations to take care of their delicate planet.

In late 2006, only three months after its installation, the structure collapsed. Reconstruction was completed on October 26, 2010. The statue was dismantled in December 2022 due to continuing structural insufficiencies.

==== Convocation Center ====
The Convocation Center is located southeast of the Campus Green and houses the NCAA Division I men's and women's basketball programs at Kennesaw State University. The Convocation Center is a multipurpose facility that supports academic classes, lectures, concerts, theatrical performances, athletic events, graduations, and convocation ceremonies. The facility has locker rooms, training rooms, and offices for the athletic department. The third floor of the center houses hospitality and conference suits that overlook the arena floor. KSU's Convocation Center is the largest of its kind in northwest Georgia, with seating for 4,800.

==== Bentley Rare Book Gallery ====
The Bentley Rare Book Gallery and Special Collections houses 15,000 items.

==== Dr. Bobbie Bailey and Family Performance Center ====
The Bailey Performance Center opened in 2007. The facility contains a 630-seat auditorium and the Don Russell Clayton Gallery. It serves as the heart of Kennesaw State's Bailey School of Music.

==== Other selected buildings ====
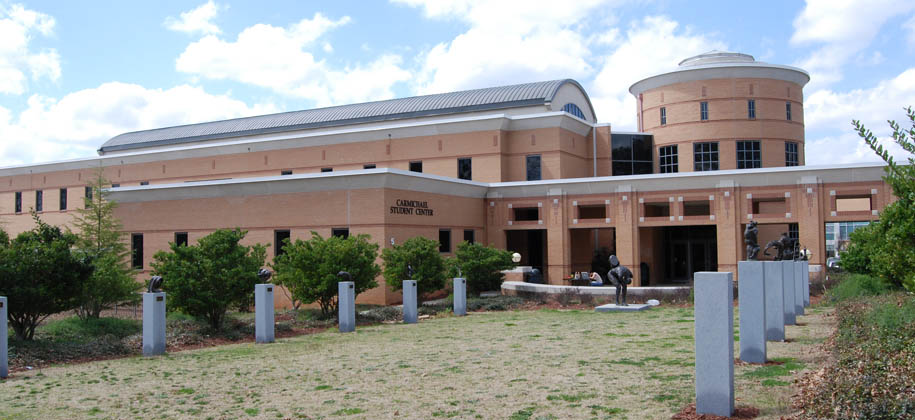
Student Center

The historic district of the university (Original Campus) is located in the west section of campus and includes the University College, formerly the Social Sciences Building, Pilcher Public Service and Library, Willingham Hall, Nursing, Advancement, and Technology Annex buildings. These buildings served primarily as the home to the College of Humanities and Social Science until construction on the Social Science Building was completed at the end of 2006. In 2009, a new two-story, 1,500-seat dining hall known as The Commons opened. In 2008, a new $46,000,000, 915-bed freshman residence hall called "University Suites" opened.

=== Marietta Campus ===
The Marietta Campus is, as of 2020, mostly in the Marietta city limits.

==== Student housing ====
Dormitory facilities were provided at Southern Tech's first location in Chamblee, Georgia. They were created from former bachelor officers' quarters in facilities leased from the Atlanta Naval Air Station. When the campus moved to Marietta, student accommodation was located in former employee housing at the United States Air Force Plant 6. Construction for the Marietta campus' first dormitory began in 1964. The campus dormitories housed only men until 1974.

At the time of its merger with Kennesaw State University, Southern Polytechnic State University had five on-campus housing facilities for its students. These were Howell Hall, Hornet Village suites, University Commons apartments, University Courtyard apartments, and University Columns houses. These facilities are still used to house KSU students.

== Academics ==
Academic rankings

National
- Forbes: 639
- U.S. News & World Report: 293–381
- Washington Monthly: 226

Kennesaw State University is accredited by the Southern Association of Colleges and Schools and classified as a comprehensive institution by the University System of Georgia.

In September 2016, U.S. News elevated KSU from the category of "regional university" to "national university", joining a list of 297 other universities in that category. This was in part due to the university's new status as a research university by the Carnegie Classification of Institutions of Higher Learning, indicating a university that engages in a "moderate" level of research activity.

In 2018, the Carnegie Classification of Institutions of Higher Learning classified KSU as a doctoral research institution with R2 (Doctoral University – High research activity) status.

The 2020 U.S. News rankings placed KSU in Tier Two (#293–381) in the "National Universities" category.

=== Colleges and degrees ===
The university is divided into 11 colleges and offers 76 bachelor's degrees, 43 master's degree programs, five specialist degrees, and nine doctoral programs; according to Kennesaw State's Registrar's Office, the university offers over 190 undergraduate and graduate degrees.

- College of Architecture and Construction Management (CACM)
- Robert S. Geer Family College of the Arts
- Michael J. Coles College of Business
- College of Computing and Software Engineering (CCSE)
- Bagwell College of Education (BCOE)
- Southern Polytechnic College of Engineering and Engineering Technology (SPCEET)
- Wellstar College of Health and Human Services (WCHHS)
- Norman J. Radow College of Humanities and Social Sciences (RCHSS)
- College of Science and Mathematics (CSM)
- KSU Journey Honors College
- Graduate College

=== Continuing Education ===
Kennesaw State's Department of Community and Professional Education, the largest in the nation, is housed in the KSU Center, located a mile away from the main campus.

Kennesaw State is home to the state's largest Educational Technology Training Center (ETTC). The ETTC is one of 13 such centers around the state. Teachers and other school personnel from around the state come to the KSU ETTC for professional development.

== Research ==
Research is grouped into four themes: Biomedical and Health; Computing and Technology, Human development & Well-being; and Sustainable and Safe Communities.

== Student life ==
Undergraduate demographics as of Fall 2023
Race and ethnicity	Total
White	43%
Black	27%
Hispanic	16%
Two or more races	5%
International student	2%
Unknown	2%
Economic diversity
Low-income (Note: The percentage of students who received an income-based federal Pell grant intended for low-income students.)	37%
Affluent (Note: The percentage of students who are a part of the American middle class at the bare minimum.)	63%

=== Student groups ===
KSU has approximately 300 registered student groups and organizations for student participation. Many of these groups may apply for funding from the Student Activities and Budget Advisory Committee (SABAC), which is a student-run advisory committee to the vice president of student affairs. This committee meets regularly during the fall and spring semesters.

=== Student media ===
- The Sentinel (KSU) is the official newspaper for KSU. It is printed weekly during fall and spring semesters and twice during the summer semester.
- Kennesaw’s Worst is the feature magazine for Kennesaw State University.
- The Peak is the former magazine for Kennesaw State University.
- Owl Radio is the student-run online radio station for KSU. Content is streamed online with mixlr and available on the mixlr mobile application.
- Talisman is the name of the former student yearbook for KSU.

=== Student demographics ===
In fall 2023, Kennesaw State was 49% male and 51% female. The ethnic diversity was as follows: 42.5% White, 26.4% Black/African-American, 14.6% Hispanic/Latino, 5.8% Asian, 4.6% multi-racial, and 2.5% undeclared. 93.2% of students were from Georgia and 3.4% of students were from outside the U.S.

=== Fraternities and sororities ===
Kennesaw State University is home to twenty-one fraternities and sororities: twelve of the North American Interfraternity Conference (IFC), eight of the National Panhellenic Conference (NPC), nine of the National Pan-Hellenic Council (NPHC), eight of the National Multicultural Greek Council (MGC) and two service Greeks. Less than seven percent (7%) of the undergraduate student body is active in KSU's Greek system.

== Athletics ==
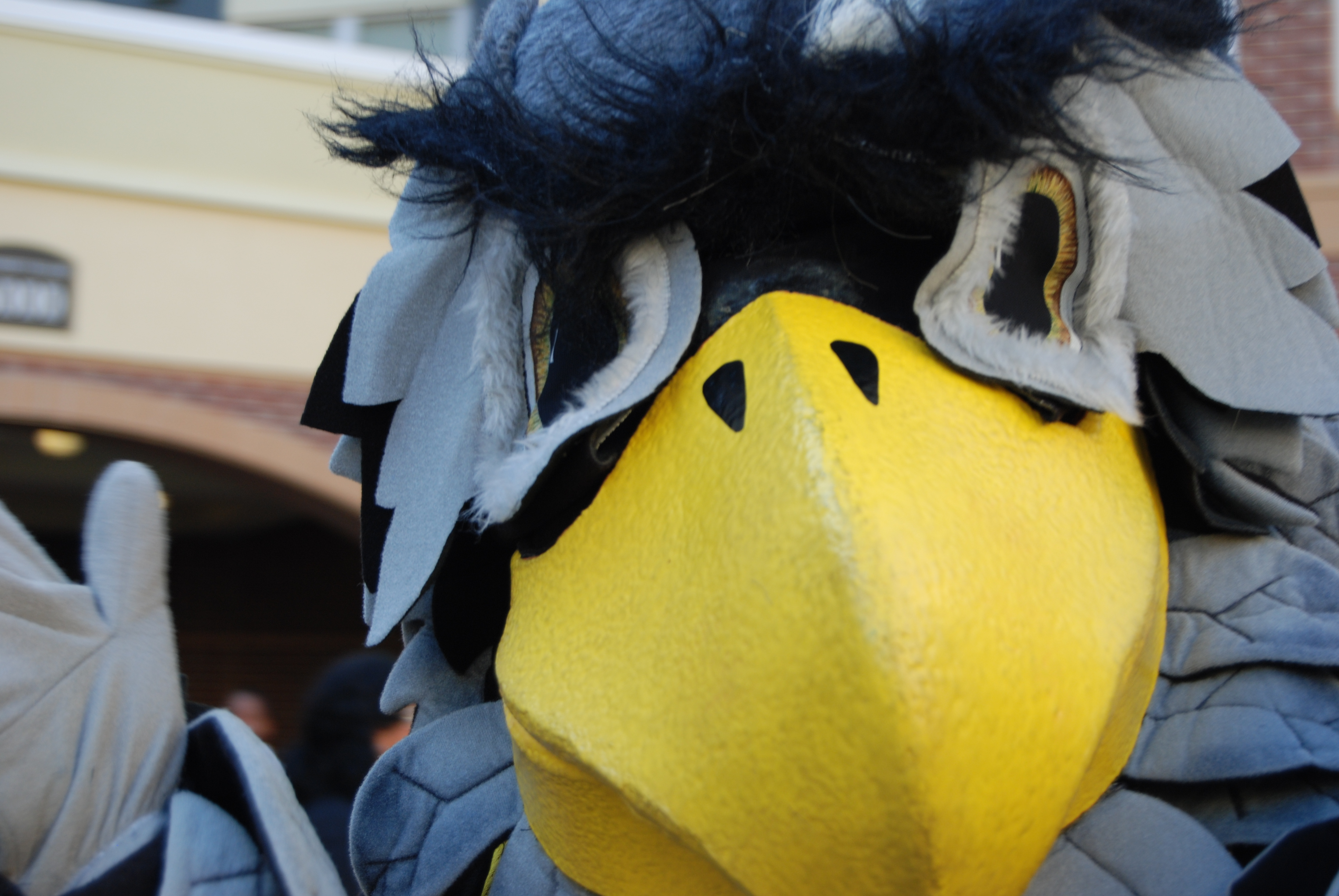
Scrappy's retired mascot during new student orientation

Kennesaw State University's athletic teams are called the Owls. The school colors are black and gold.

The Owls participate in Division I of the NCAA and as a member of Conference USA. Athletics began in the 1981–82 academic year, with KSU joining both the National Association of Intercollegiate Athletics (NAIA) and the Georgia Intercollegiate Athletic Conference (GIAC). James "Spec" Landrum was named the school's first athletic director, after football coaching stints at both Georgia and Georgia Tech. After Division I's Gulf Star Conference dissolved in 1987, Commissioner Dave Waples replaced the retiring Landrum that fall. The school won its initial National title in 1994, as coach Mike Sansing's baseball team won the NAIA championship.

In the fall of 1994, KSU officially joined the NCAA Division II, Peach Belt Conference.

The Owls dominated the conference for the next 11-years, including DII National crowns in softball (1995 and 1996, coach Scott Whitlock), baseball (1996, coach Sansing), women's soccer (2003, coach Rob King) and men's basketball (2004, coach Tony Ingle). Kennesaw State is one of two Division II schools to win a national championship in four different team sports, Grand Valley State University being the other. KSU also won several other regional and divisional championships. Both men's and women's cross-country coach Stan Sims and women's basketball coach Colby Tilley made numerous appearance in NCAA, DII national competitions.

In 2005, the Owls began the four-year transition to Division I of the NCAA.

Vaughn Williams was hired in April 2011 as the university's third director of athletics. He had previously served for six and a half years as the University of Connrcticut's associate athletic director, where he was responsible for strategic planning, facility master planning, and policy and procedure improvement.

The Owls announced on November 14, 2013 that they would start a Division I Football Championship Subdivision (FCS) football team. Their first game was against the East Tennessee State Buccaneers in Johnson City, Tennessee, on September 3, 2015. The Owls initially competed as a part of the Big South Conference because the ASUN did not sponsor football. Head Coach Brian Bohannon stated at the time that Kennesaw State had no interest in playing any games in exchange for guaranteed payments in the team's first few years.

By the end of 2019 the Kennesaw Owls tallied a 48–15 total record from the beginning of the program, giving the team the record of most wins for a football program in its first five years.

The Owls play home games at Fifth Third Bank Stadium in Kennesaw.

KSU announced in 2022 that they would be leaving the ASUN Conference for Conference USA in all sports starting in the 2024–2025 academic year. With the move, the Owls Football program moved from NCAA Division I FCS to NCAA Division I Football Bowl SubdIvision (FBS) competition.

== Traditions ==
=== School colors ===
The official Kennesaw State University school colors are black and gold.

=== Mascot ===
Kennesaw State University's mascot is Scrappy the Owl. Kennesaw State University also has a live mascot, Sturgis the Owl, named after Dr. Horace T. Sturgis, the first president of Kennesaw State.

== Notable people ==
=== Alumni ===
- Akbar Ali, Democratic member of the Georgia House of Representatives
- Nick Ayers, former Chief of Staff to the Vice President of the United States
- Michael Caldwell, Republican member of the Georgia House of Representatives
- Arturo Char, former Senator of Colombia and First Secretary of the Colombian Embassy in London
- Kristi DeMeester, writer
- Andrew Hale, actor, producer
- Willie Harris, professional baseball player, World Series Champion with Chicago White Sox, 2005
- Dar'shun Kendrick, Democratic member of the Georgia House of Representatives
- Charles Lollar, businessman and politician
- Richard Lovelady, baseball player
- Masey McLain, movie actress
- Larry Nelson, golf player
- Kandice Pelletier, Miss New York 2005, appeared on CBS's The Amazing Race 10 (attended)
- Ty Pennington, host of ABC's Extreme Makeover: Home Edition and TLC's Trading Spaces (attended)
- Max Pentecost, first round pick in 2014 MLB draft
- Nels S.D. Peterson, Chief Justice of the Supreme Court of Georgia
- Mac Powell, singer
- Shannon Purser, actress
- Bronson Rechsteiner, wrestler and football player
- Ali Shilatifard, molecular biologist
- Lauren Simmons, stockbroker
- Doug Stoner, Georgia State Senator
- Drew Thomas, comedian
- James Wade, basketball player and coach
- Richard Woods, Georgia Superintendent of Schools
- Kaycee Grogan, 1990s Columbia Records recording artist and actress

=== Professors and scholars ===
- Joe Bock, Director, School of Conflict Management
- Rhubarb Jones, professor of mass communications
- Farooq Kperogi, professor of journalism and emerging media
- Melanie Sumner, writer
- Kerwin Swint, professor of political science
- Britain J. Williams, computer science professor

== Demographics ==
Kennesaw State University CDP
- Census-designated place
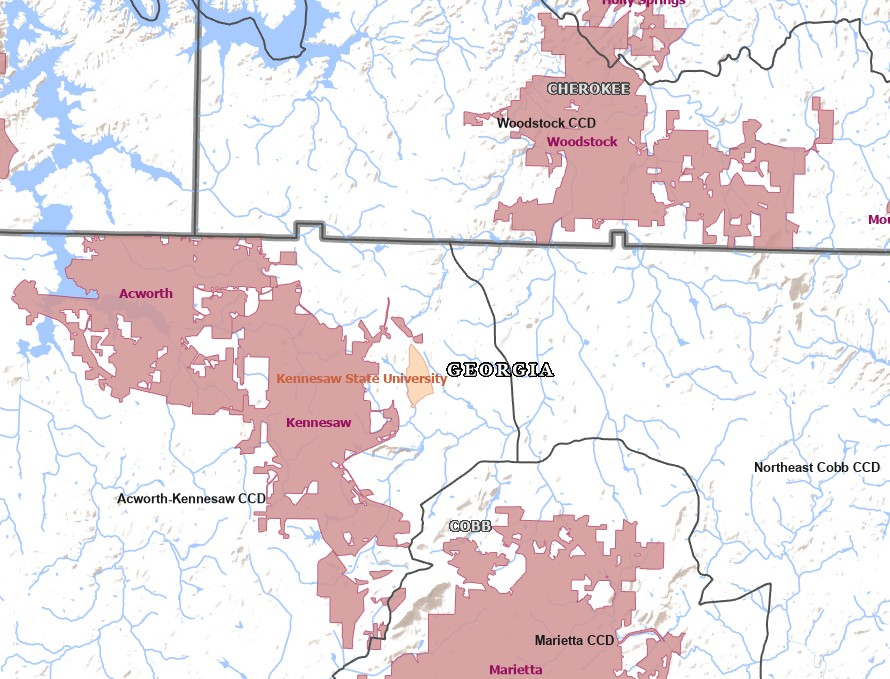

- Location within Georgia Location within the United States
- Country: United States
- State: Georgia
- County: Cobb
- Elevation: 1,063 ft (324 m)

Population (2020)
  - Total: 382
- Time zone: UTC−6 (Central (CST))
  - Summer (DST): UTC−5 (CDT)
- GNIS feature ID: 2806016

Kennesaw State University CDP is a census-designated place (CDP) and the official name for an area covering the Kennesaw State University campus in Cobb County, Georgia. It does not include the Kennesaw State University campus in Marietta. It first appeared as a CDP in the 2020 Census with a population of 382.

The CDP is in the Cobb County School District.

Historical population
Census	Pop.	Note	%±
2020	382		—
U.S. Decennial Census; 2020

=== 2020 census ===
Kennesaw State University CDP, Georgia – racial and ethnic composition Note: the US Census treats Hispanic/Latino as an ethnic category. This table excludes Latinos from the racial categories and assigns them to a separate category. Hispanics/Latinos may be of any race.
Race / Ethnicity (NH = Non-Hispanic)	Pop 2020	% 2020
White alone (NH)	166	43.46%
Black or African American alone (NH)	152	39.79%
Native American or Alaska Native alone (NH)	4	1.05%
Asian alone (NH)	16	4.19%
Native Hawaiian or Pacific Islander alone (NH)	0	0.00%
Other race alone (NH)	0	0.00%
Mixed race or Multiacial (NH)	13	3.40%
Hispanic or Latino (any race)	31	8.12%
Total	382	100.00%
