= Betty Siegel =

American academic (1931–2020)

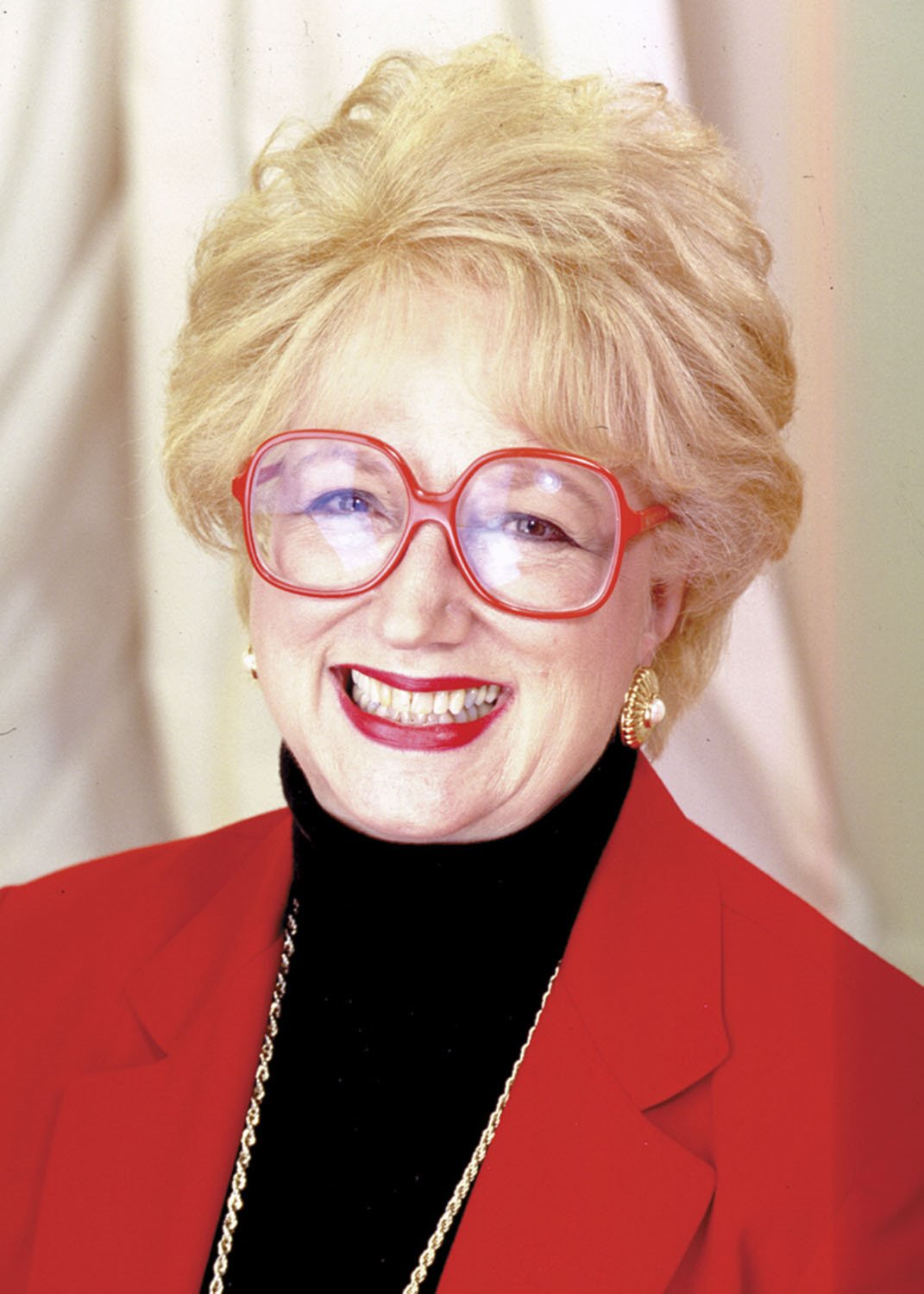

2nd President of the Kennesaw State University
- In office 1981–2006
- Preceded by: Horace W. Sturgis
- Succeeded by: Daniel S. Papp

Personal details
- Born: Betty Faye Lentz; January 24, 1931 Cumberland, Kentucky
- Died: February 11, 2020 (aged 89) Atlanta, Georgia
- Spouse: Joel Siegel

Academic background
- Education: Wake Forest University (BA); University of North Carolina at Chapel Hill (MEd); Florida State University (PhD)
- Thesis: The Interrelationships Of The Concepts Of Self And Others, Social Acceptability, And Curriculum Patterns (1961)
- Doctoral advisor: Herman Frick

Academic work
- Discipline: Education
- Institutions: University of Florida; Western Carolina University; Kennesaw State University

Betty L. Siegel (January 24, 1931 – February 11, 2020) was an author and president of Kennesaw State University. She was the first female president of the University System of Georgia. She served in that position for 25 years, making her the longest serving female president of a state university in the United States.

In 2007 Siegel was President Emeritus and Distinguished Chair of Leadership, Ethics & Character at Kennesaw State University.

== Education ==
Siegel was born Betty Faye Lentz in Cumberland, Kentucky to Carl N. and Vera (Hogg) Lentz. She received her bachelor's degree from Wake Forest, a master's degree from the University of North Carolina, a Ph.D. from Florida State University, and post-doctoral studies at Indiana University. In addition to her earned degrees, she had been awarded five honorary doctorates.

== Career ==
- Assistant professor, Lenoir Rhyne College, Hickory, North Carolina, 1956–59; associate professor, 1961–64;
- Assistant professor, University of Florida, Gainesville, 1967–70, associate professor, 1970–72, professor, 1973–76, Dean academy affairs for continuing education, 1972–76;
- Dean, School of Education and Psychology, Western Carolina University, Cullowhee, North Carolina, 1976–81;
- President Kennesaw State University, Kennesaw, Georgia, 1981–2006.
- President Emeritus and Distinguished Chair of Leadership, Ethics and Character Kennesaw State University, Kennesaw, Georgia, 2006–2020.
- Co-founder of the International Alliance for Invitational Education.
- Convener of the Oxford Conclaves on Global Ethical Leadership
- Board of Directors, Character Education Partnership, 2008–2020

Academic offices
Preceded by Horace W. Sturgis	2nd President of Kennesaw State University; 1981–2006	Succeeded by Daniel S. Papp
