= British Journal of Educational Psychology =

- Discipline: Educational Psychology
- Language: English

Publication details
- History: 1931-Present
- Publisher: Wiley-Blackwell on behalf of the British Psychological Society.
- Frequency: Quarterly
- Impact factor: 2.481 (2018)

Standard abbreviations
- ISO 4: Br. J. Educ. Psychol.

Indexing
- ISSN: 0007-0998 (print); 2044-8279 (web)

Links
- Journal homepage; Online access; Online archive

British Journal of Educational Psychology is a quarterly peer-reviewed academic journal published by Wiley-Blackwell on behalf of the British Psychological Society. It was established in 1931. The journal was preceded by the Journal of Experimental Pedagogy and College Training Record which ran from 1911 to 1922 and which then became the Forum of Education until 1930. The journal covers psychological research pertaining to education in areas such as cognition, learning, motivation, literacy, numeracy and language, behaviour, social-emotional development and developmental difficulties.

According to the Journal Citation Reports, the journal has a 2018 impact factor of 2.481, ranking it 14th out of 59 journals in the category "Psychology Educational".
