= Educational Administration Quarterly =

- Discipline: Education
- Language: English
- Edited by: Gerardo R. López

Publication details
- History: 1964–present
- Publisher: SAGE Publications
- Frequency: 5/year
- Impact factor: 1.851 (2017)

Standard abbreviations
- ISO 4: Educ. Adm. Q.

Indexing
- ISSN: 0013-161X (print); 1552-3519 (web)
- LCCN: sf85001024
- OCLC no.: 1567565

Links
- Journal homepage; Online access; Online archive

Educational Administration Quarterly is a peer-reviewed academic journal covering the field of education. The editor-in-chief is Gerardo R. López (Michigan State University). It was established in 1965 and is published by SAGE Publications in association with the University Council for Educational Administration.

== Abstracting and indexing ==
The journal is abstracted and indexed in Scopus and the Social Sciences Citation Index. According to the Journal Citation Reports, its 2017 impact factor is 1.851, ranking it 67th out of 238 journals in the category "Education & Educational Research".
