= John Hattie =

New Zealand pedagogue and education researcher

John Hattie ONZM
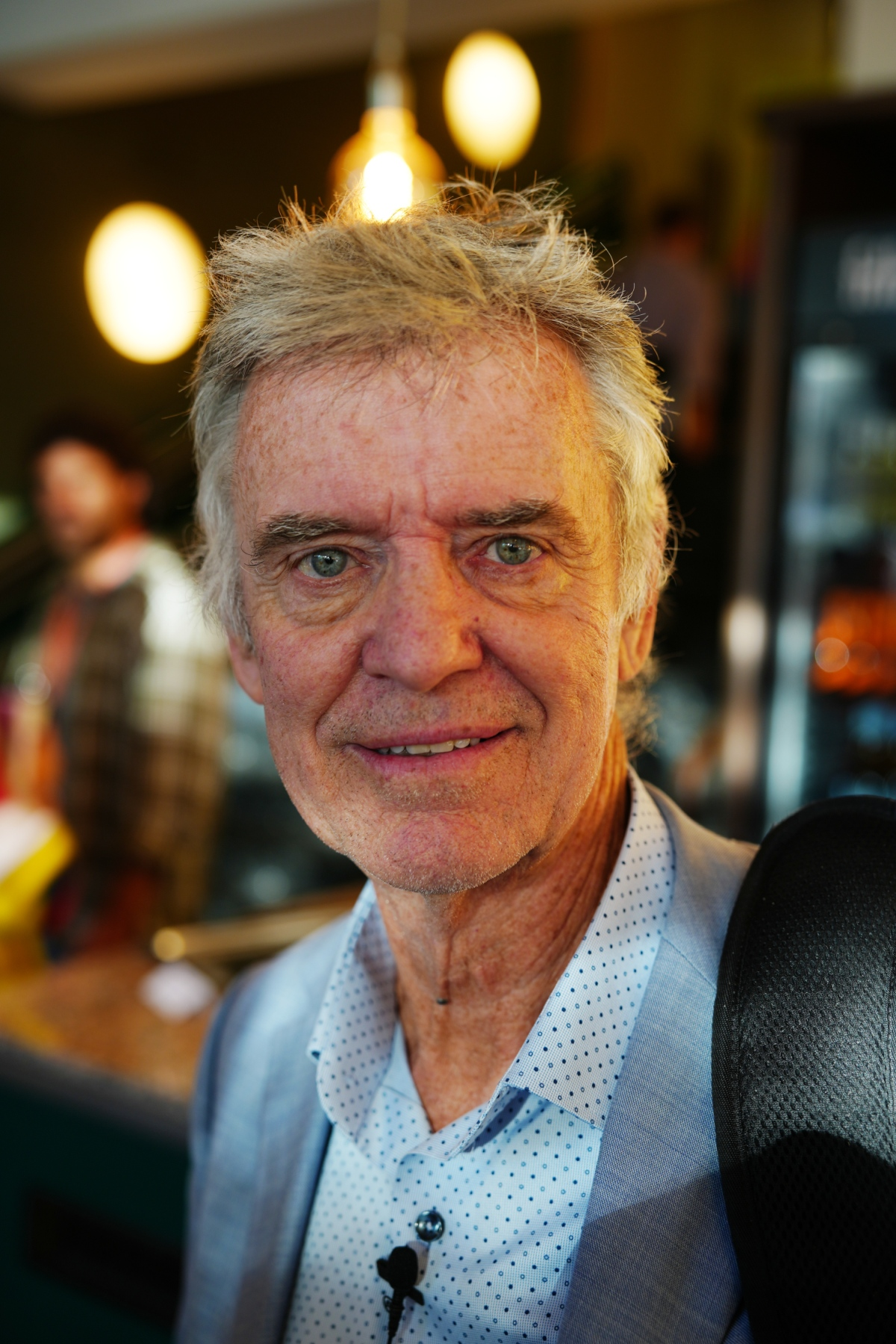
- Hattie in September 2025
- Born: 1950 (age 75–76); Timaru, New Zealand

Academic background
- Education: University of Toronto
- Thesis: Decision criteria for determining unidimensionality (1981)

Academic work
- Doctoral students: Christine Rubie-Davies; Melinda Webber

John Allan Clinton Hattie ONZM (born 1950) is a New Zealand education academic. He has been a professor of education and director of the Melbourne Education Research Institute at the University of Melbourne, Australia, since March 2011. He was previously professor of education at the University of Auckland, the University of North Carolina Greensboro, and the University of Western Australia.

== Early life ==
Hattie was born in 1950 in Timaru, and attended Timaru Boys' High School.

== Academic career ==
John Hattie received his PhD degree in statistics from the University of Toronto in 1981 on detecting unidimensionality. His research focuses on performance indicators and evaluation in education, as well as creativity measurement and models of teaching and learning. He is a proponent of evidence-based quantitative research methodologies on the influences on student achievement. He led the team that created the Assessment Tools for Teaching and Learning research and development contract and which is currently deployed by the New Zealand Ministry of Education for use in schools. Prior to his move to the University of Melbourne, Hattie was a member of the independent advisory group reporting to the New Zealand's Minister of Education on the national standards in reading, writing and maths for all primary school children in New Zealand.

Hattie undertook the largest ever synthesis of meta-analyses of quantitative measures of the effect of different factors on educational outcomes leading to his book Visible Learning.

Hattie advised the Fifth National Government of New Zealand on national learning standards and performance-related pay for teachers.

Visible Learning has come under criticism for mathematical flaws in the calculation of effect sizes and misleading presentation of meta-analyses in the book.

In the 2011 Queen's Birthday Honours, Hattie was appointed an Officer of the New Zealand Order of Merit for services to education.

Notable students of Hattie's include Christine Rubie-Davies and Melinda Webber.

He is married to Professor Janet Clinton, also at the University of Melbourne.

In 2025, Stephen Vainker, a former researcher, alleged there were "hundreds of instances of plagiarism and data errors" in Hattie's work. In response, Hattie filed a defamation lawsuit against Vainker, while the University of Melbourne randomly reviewed 14 instances of plagiarism, and found no misconduct. Though they initially decided against doing so, the university later opened a formal investigation into Hattie.

== Bibliography ==
- Hattie, John A. (2008). Visible Learning: A Synthesis of Over 800 Meta-Analyses Relating to Achievement. SAGE Publications. ISBN 978-0-415-47618-8.
- Hattie, John A. (2011). Visible Learning for Teachers: Maximizing Impact on Learning. SAGE Publications. ISBN 978-0-415-69015-7.
- Fletcher, Richard B.; Hattie, John A. (2011). Intelligence and Intelligence Testing.
