= Nina Valetova =

American painter

- Нина Валетова
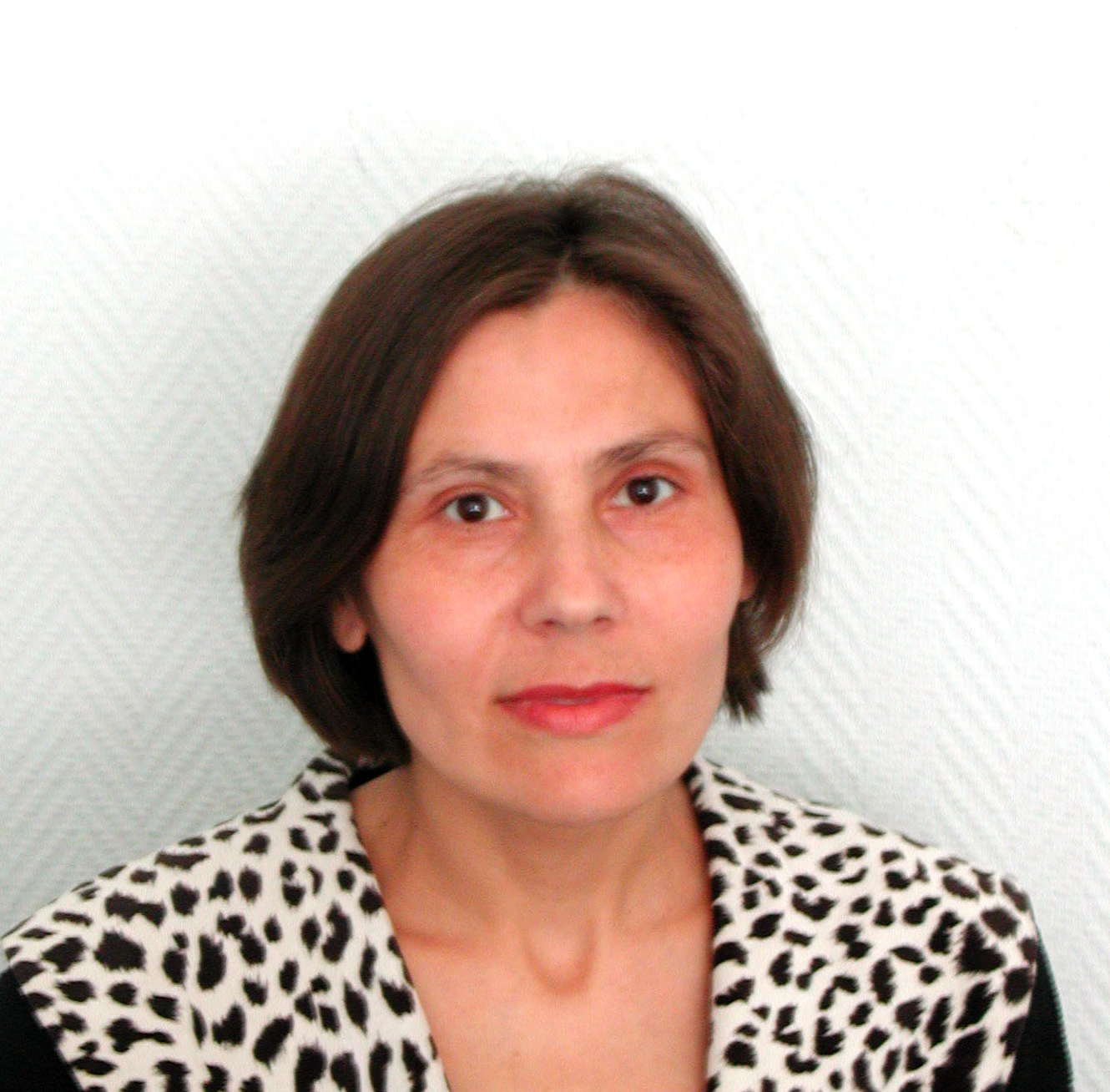
- Self-Portrait, 2010
- Born: 19 November 1958; Berdyash, Bashkir Autonomous Soviet Socialist Republic, Russian SFSR, Soviet Union
- Education: Bashkir State Pedagogical Institute
- Known for: Painting
- Movement: synthesis, metaphysical, visionary
- Website: www.artvaletova.com

Nina Petrovna Valetova (Russian: Нина Петровна Валетова), or Nina Tokhtaman Valetova (Russian: Нина Тохтаман Валетова), born November 19, 1958, is a Russian-American metaphysical realism painter.

Nina Valetova was born in Berdyash, Bashkir Autonomous Soviet Socialist Republic, Russian SFSR, Soviet Union and graduated as a Specialist from the Faculty of Arts and Graphics of Bashkir State Pedagogical Institute in Ufa. She immigrated to the United States in 1993. Nina Valetova is the developer of Synthesis Art Style in visual art, - painting and drawing, that combines abstract, figurative arts with cubism, suprematism and surrealism.

== Works in public collections ==
Her work is in the collections of the Moscow Museum of Modern Art, Moscow, Russia, Chuvash State Art Museum, Cheboksary, Russia, Novocheboksarsk Art Museum, Novocheboksarsk, Russia, and Omsk Center of Contemporary Art, Omsk, Russia.

== Exhibitions ==
She has exhibited at the Chuvash State Art Museum, Cheboksary, Russia; Manege, Moskva (Moscow), Russia; Arthaus Gallery, Dallas, TX, U.S.A.; and Boulevard Galerie, Kopnhavn (Copenhagen), Denmark.

=== Gallery ===
Oil paintings

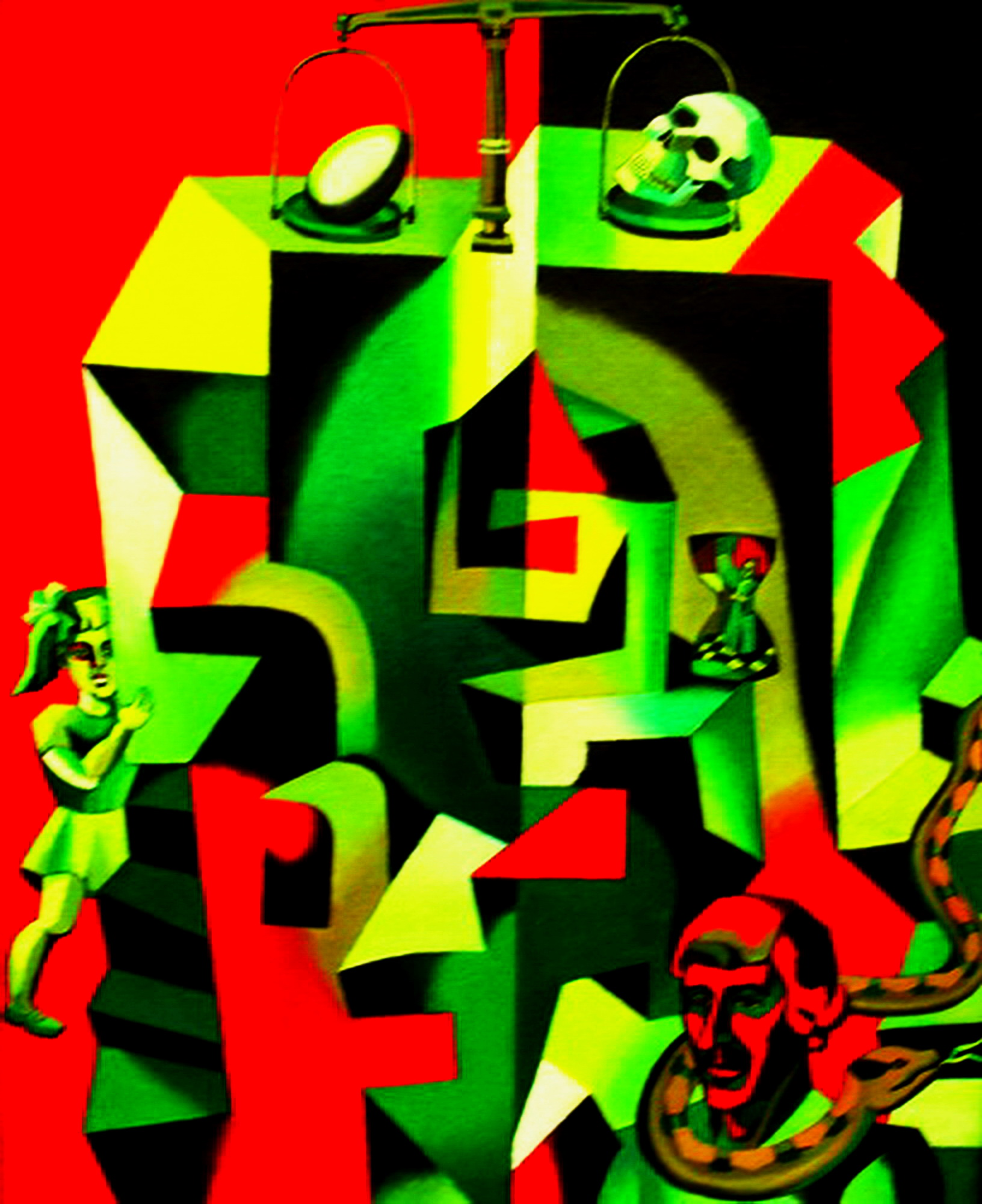
Creation and Destruction, 2009

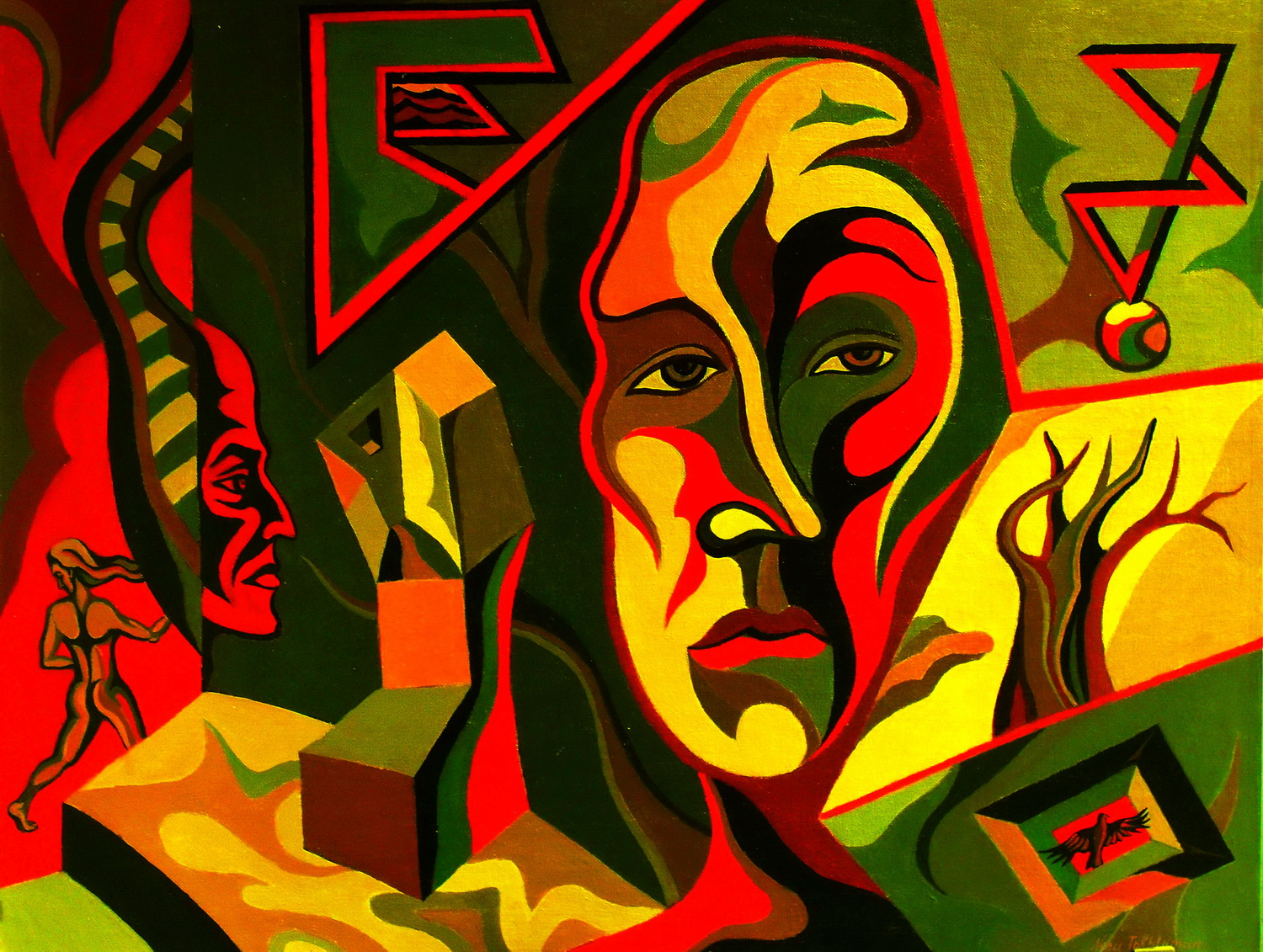
Event Horizon, 2013

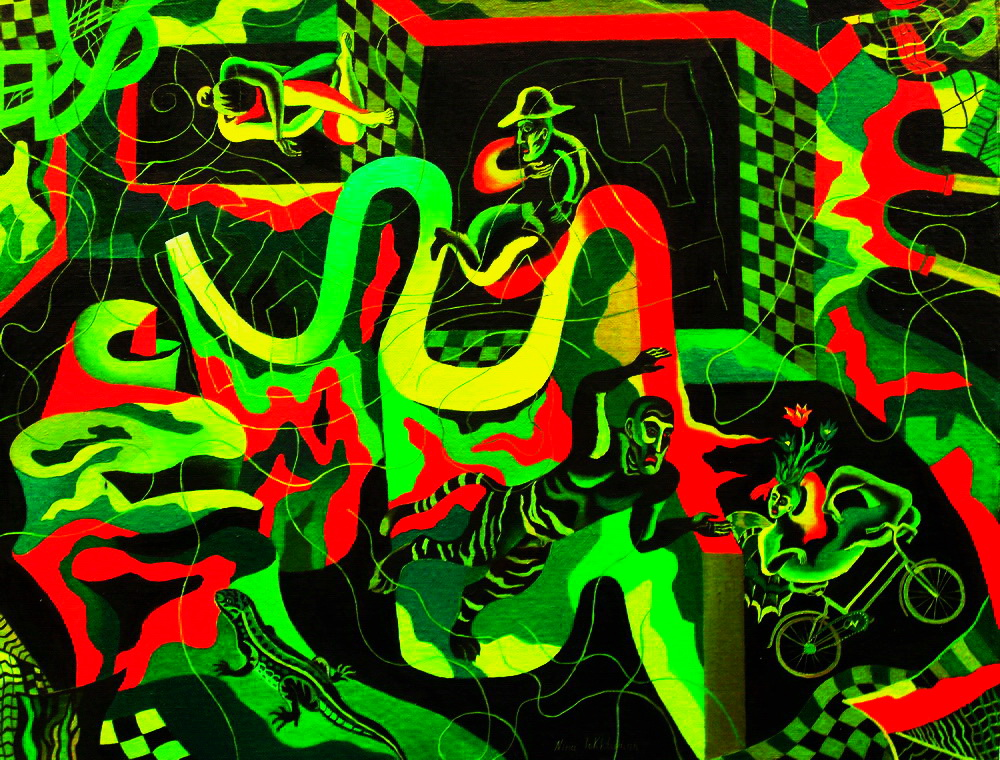
Dark Matter, 2009

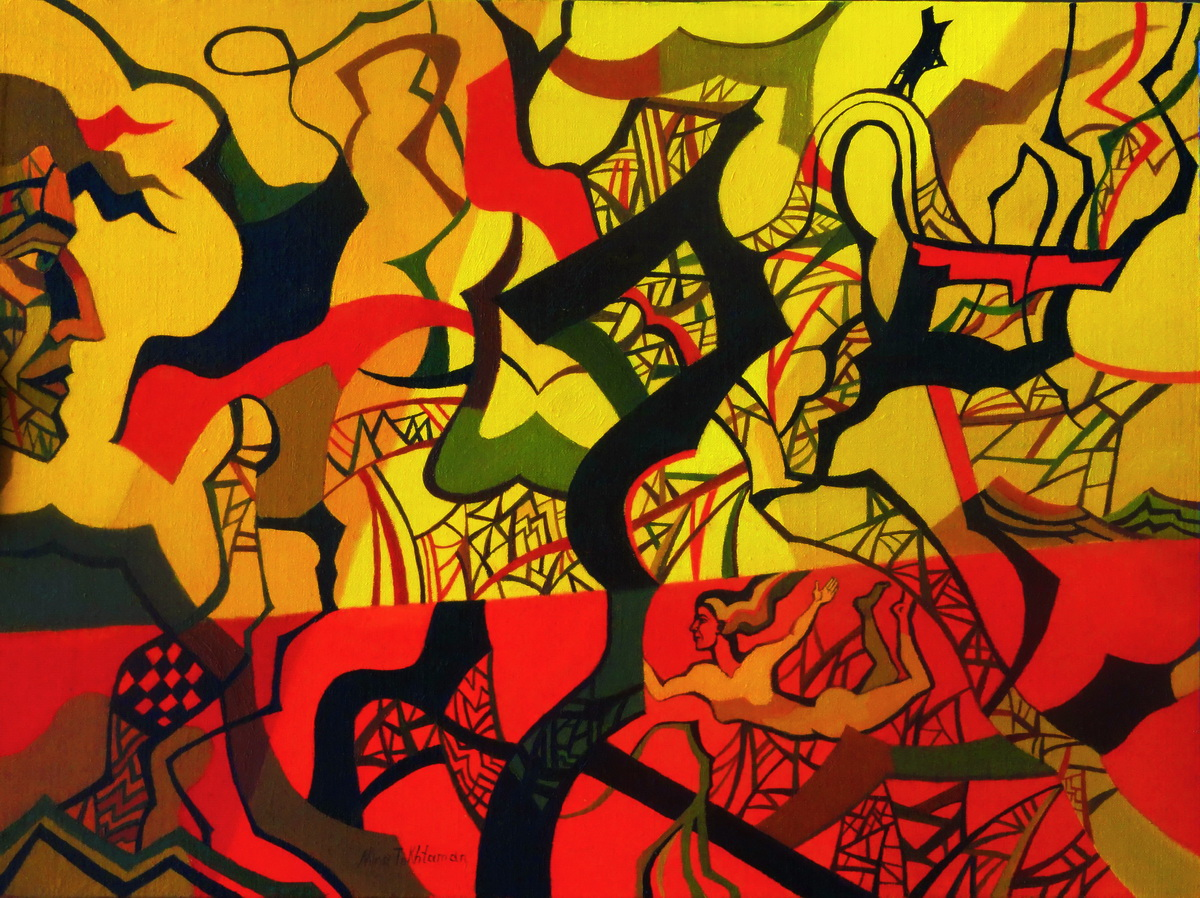
Mirror of Time, 2011

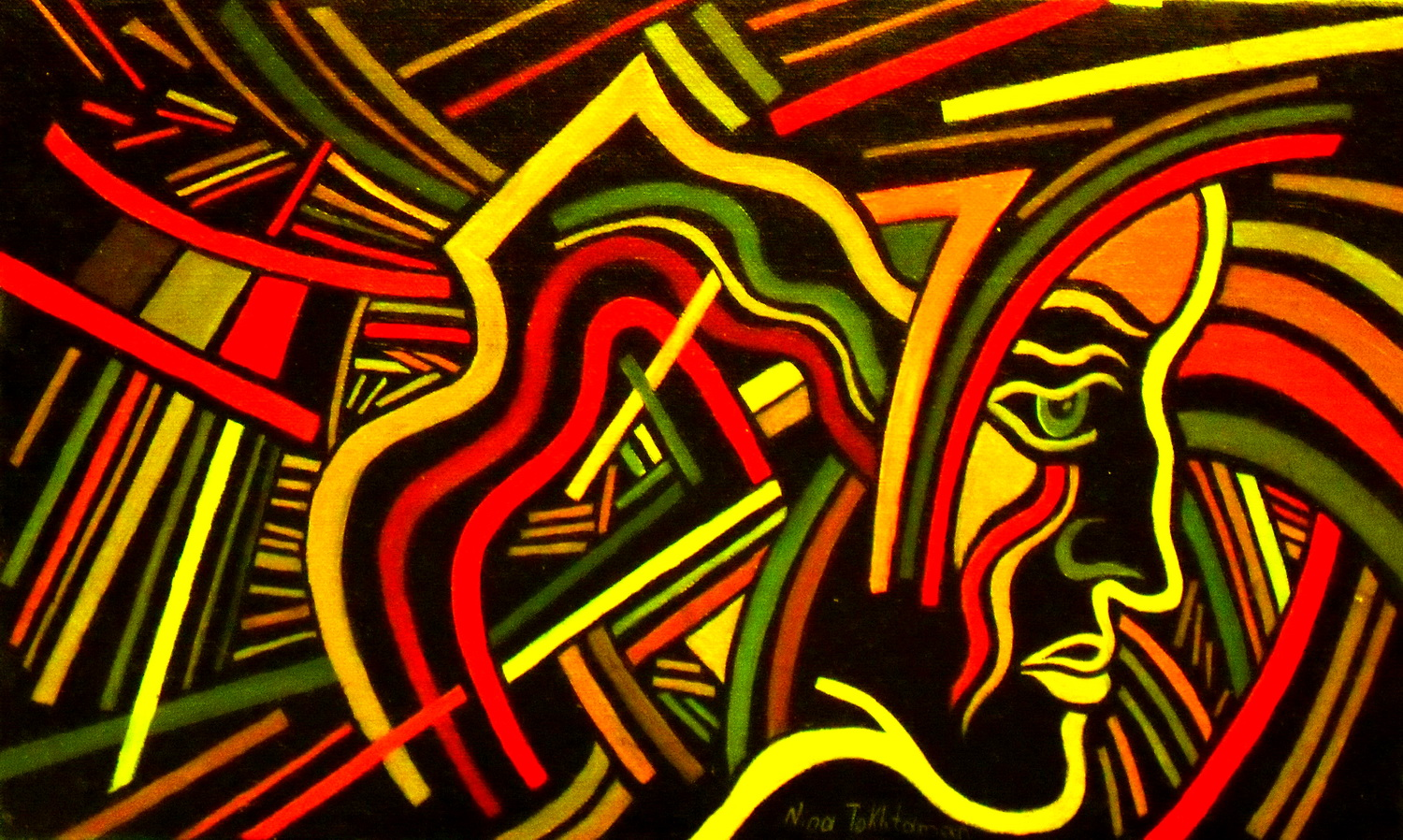
Nightly Stranger, 2009

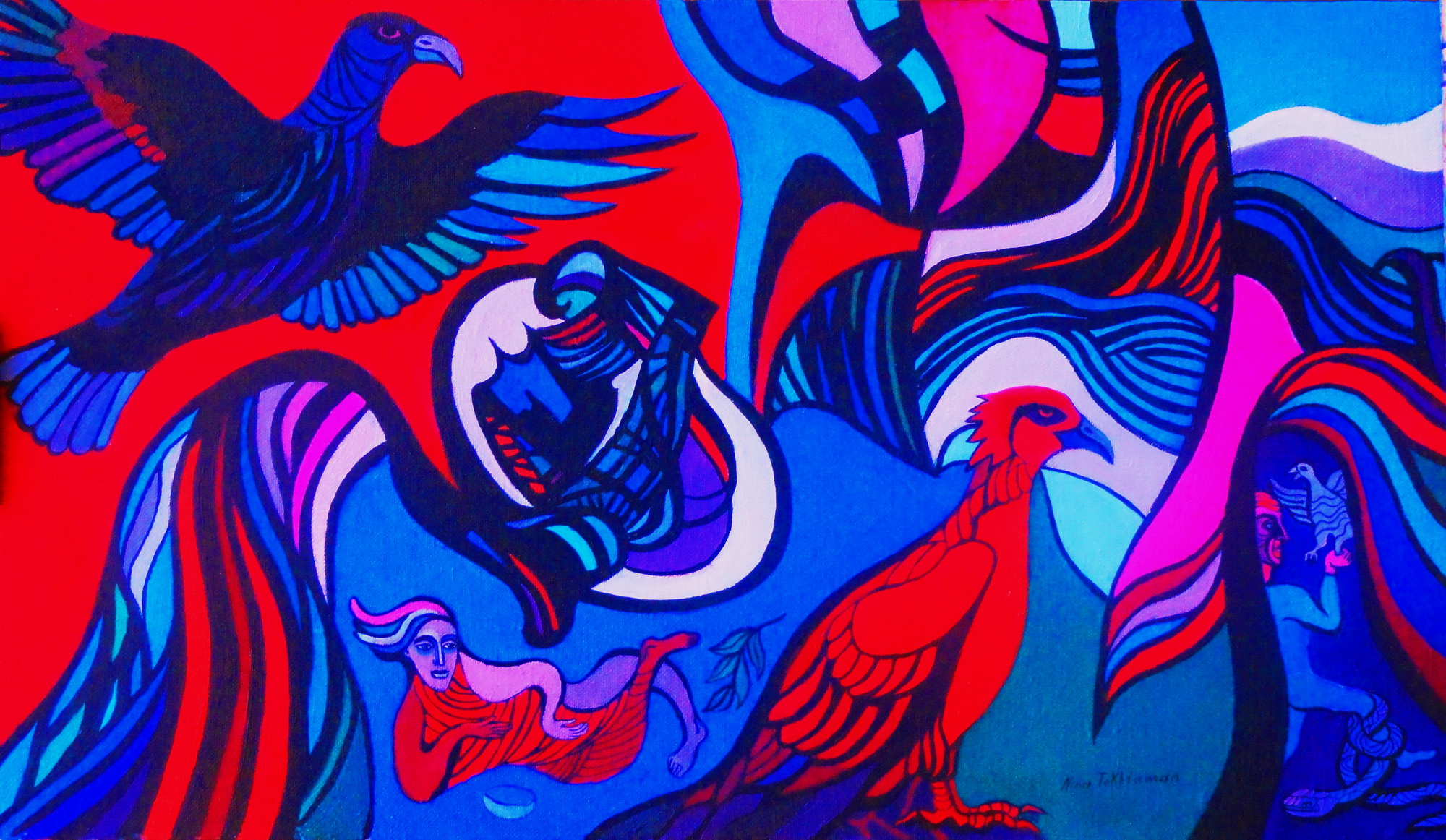
Bird Phoenix, 2011

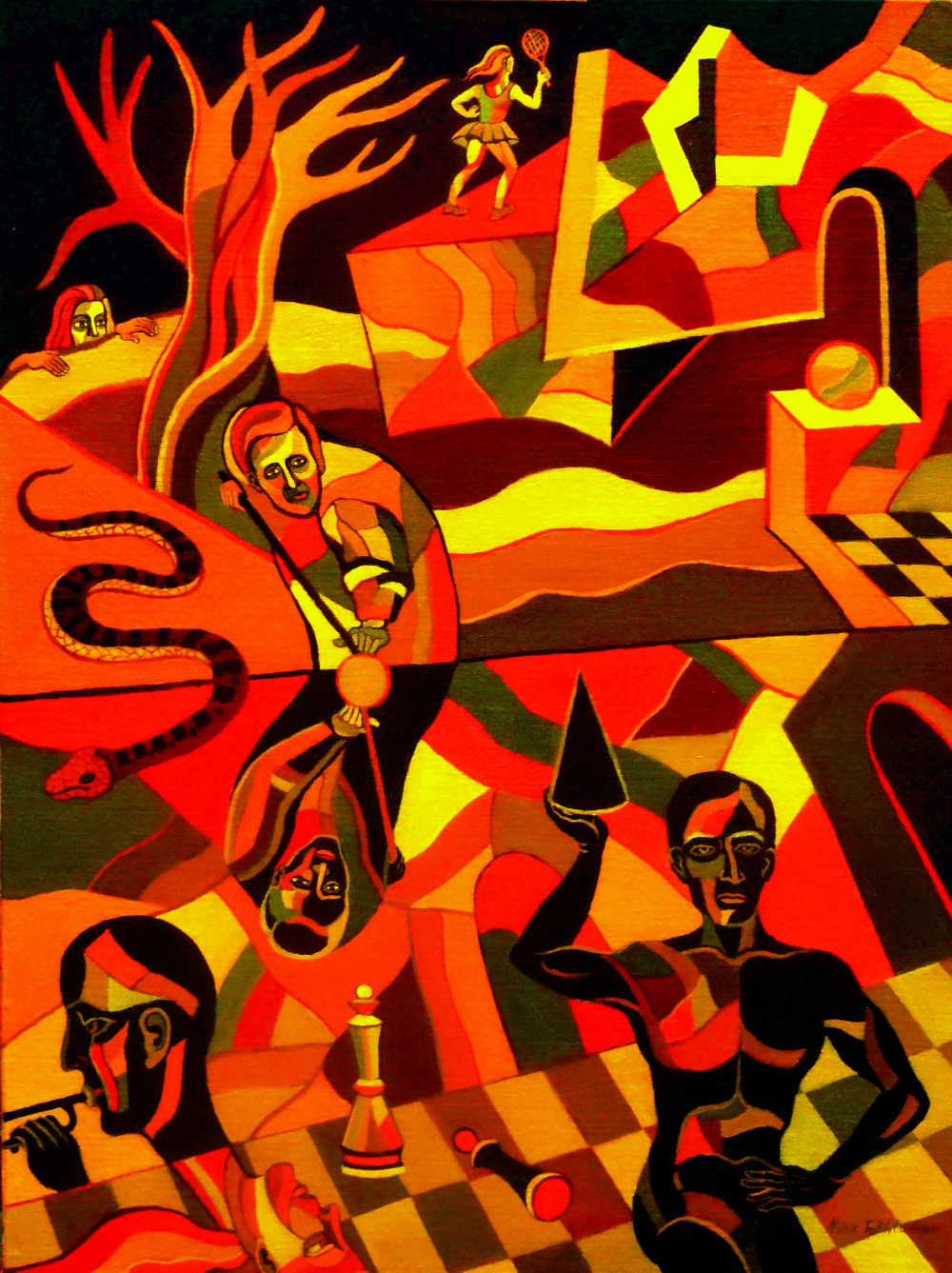
Obscure Games, 2011

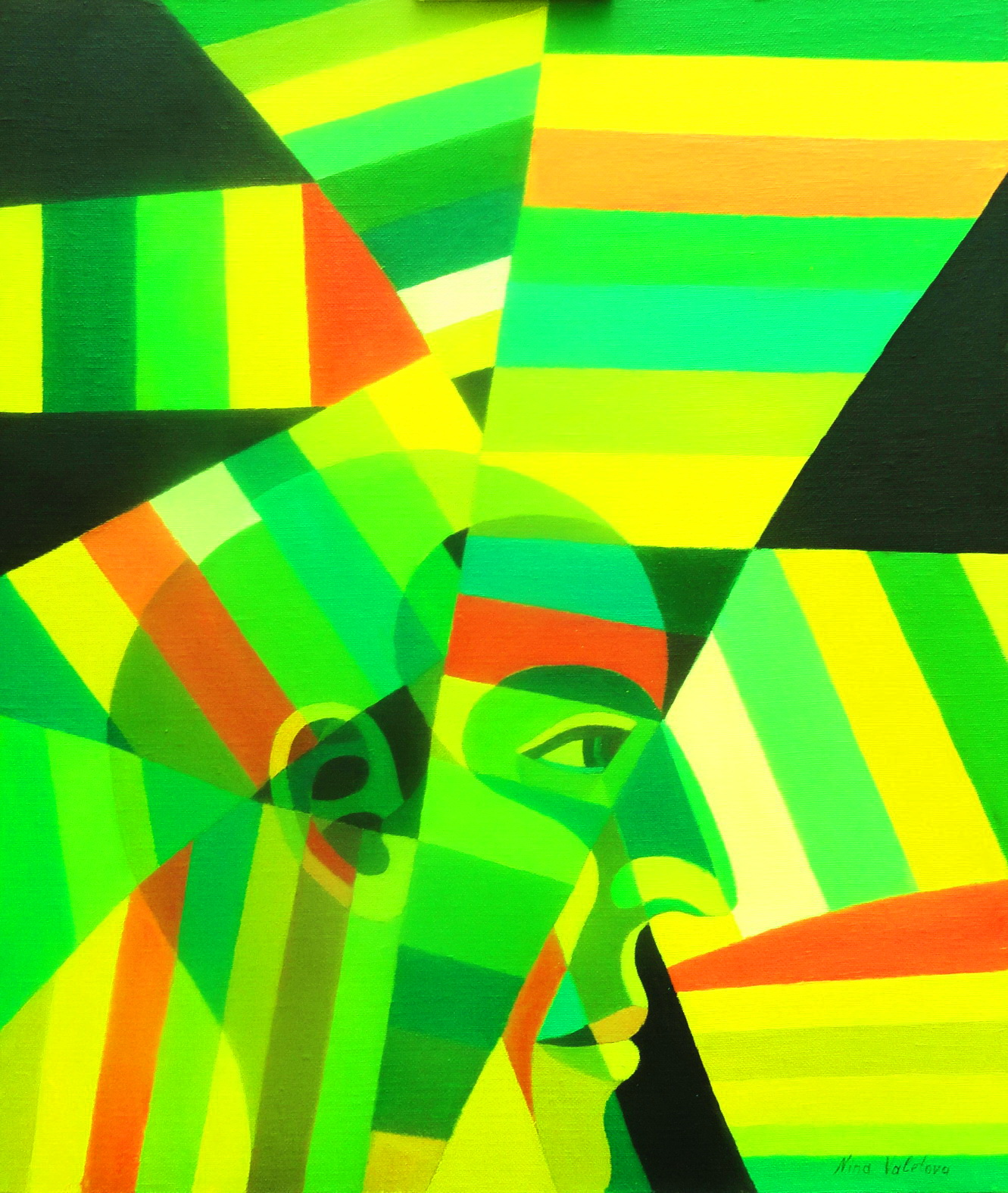
Solar Wind, 2011
