= Berdyash =

Berdyash (Russian: Бердяш) is the name of two rural localities in the Republic of Bashkortostan, Russia:

- Berdyash, Karaidelsky District, Republic of Bashkortostan, a selo in Baykinsky Selsoviet of Karaidelsky District
- Berdyash, Zilairsky District, Republic of Bashkortostan, a selo in Berdyashsky Selsoviet of Zilairsky District
