= Higher Education Army Institute =

Argentine university

- Instituto de Educación Superior del Ejército
- Type: Public
- Established: 1986
- Location: Buenos Aires, Argentina
- Campus: Urban
- Website: www.iese.edu.ar

The Higher Education Army Institute (Spanish: Instituto de Educación Superior del Ejército. IESE) is an Argentine university founded in 1986 and officially in 1990 that belongs to the Argentine Army and which is responsible for the technical education of this force.

== History ==
It was created on January 1, 1986, in order to coordinate all the activities of the different academic institutions of the Argentine Army. It became a National University in 1990 by the Argentine Law 17.778.

== Structure ==
The Institute encompass three education organizations associated with the Argentine Army: The War Academy, The Higher Technical School, and The Military High School.

Since 1993 the university is open to non-military students.

== Undergraduate School ==
- Officer of the Argentine Army (Management/Nursing)
- Mechanical Engineering (Weapons/Automobile)
- Electrical Engineering
- Geomatics Engineering
- Information Engineering

== Graduate school ==
=== War Academy ===
- M.S. History of war
- M.S. Strategy and Geopolitics

=== Higher Technical School ===
- Specialist degree Control theory
- Specialist degree Cryptography and Information Security
- M.S. Safety Hygiene

== See also ==
- List of Argentine universities
