= Daniel Ansari =

German-Canadian neuroscientist

- Born: December 26, 1975 (age 50)
- Education: Sussex University, Oxford University, University College London
- Known for: Children’s cognitive and neural development
- Awards: Boyd McCandless Early Career Award; Transforming Education through Neuroscience Award; Marion Welchman International Award; Fellow Canadian Institute for Advanced Research
- Scientific career
- Fields: Cognitive neuroscience, Developmental psychology, Educational psychology
- Workplaces: Dartmouth College; University of Western Ontario

Daniel Ansari (born December 26, 1975) is a German-Canadian cognitive neuroscientist and professor specializing in children's cognitive and neural development, with emphasis on numerical and mathematical skills and understanding. He is a Canada Research Chair (Tier 1) in Developmental Cognitive Neuroscience and Learning at Western University, Canada. He was a member of the college of the Royal Society of Canada from 2014 to 2017. He is also a Fellow in the Child and Brain Development Program of the Canadian Institute for Advanced Research. Ansari received the Boyd McCandless Early Career Award from the American Psychological Association. He was an Advanced Research Fellow of the Klaus J. Jacobs Foundation from 2018 to 2020.

Ansari has authored or co-authored over 150 journal articles and has over 20k citations on Google Scholar with a h-index of 81.

== Education ==
In 1999 Ansari completed his B.A. (Hons) in Psychology from the School of Cognitive and Computing Sciences at the University of Sussex.

He earned a Ph.D. from the Neurocognitive Development Unit at the Institute of Child Health, University College London, completed between 1999 and 2003.

During his doctoral studies, he became increasingly interested in neuroscience. He interrupted his PhD for a year to study for an MSc in neuroscience at the University of Oxford.

In 2003, Ansari became an assistant professor of education at Dartmouth College in the education department.

== Career ==
From July 2010 to July 2014, he served as an Associate Professor in the Department of Psychology Institute at Western University. From July 2014 to July 2018, he served as a professor.

Since July 2018, he has been serving as a Professor jointly appointed in the Department of Psychology and the Faculty of Education.

== Numerical Cognition Laboratory ==
For the past 20 years, Ansari has directed The Numerical Cognition Laboratory, a research group focused on understanding numerical processing, mathematical abilities, and the challenges some children face in early numeracy and math. The lab employs behavioral and brain imaging methods to investigate the cognitive and neural mechanisms involved in numerical cognition.

== Awards and fellowships ==
In 2011, Ansari was honored with the Boyd McCandless Early Career Award by the American Psychological Association (APA) Division 7: Developmental Psychology.

In 2012, he was the recipient of the Transforming Education through Neuroscience Award from IMBES and L&B.

He was the president of the International Mind Brain and Education Society from 2016-2018.

In 2018, Ansari received the Marion Welchman International Award from the British Dyslexia Association.

'In 2019, Ansari became Fellow in the Child and Brain Development Program of the Canadian Institute for Advanced Research (CIFAR). From 2018 to 2020 Ansari was a Tier II Canada Research Chair in Developmental Cognitive Neuroscience.

In 2020, his contributions to developmental cognitive neuroscience were further recognized with a Tier I Canada Research Chair. He earned the Jacobs Foundation Advanced Research Fellowship, spanning from 2018 to 2020.

In 2015, Ansari also received the NSERC E.W.R. Steacie Memorial Fellowship.

In 2022, Ansari was designated as a LEAP Fellow by MIT Solve.

== Selected publications ==
- Holloway, Ian D.; Ansari, Daniel (1 May 2009). "Mapping numerical magnitudes onto symbols: The numerical distance effect and individual differences in children's mathematics achievement". Journal of Experimental Child Psychology. 103 (1): 17–29. doi:10.1016/j.jecp.2008.04.001. ISSN 0022-0965. PMID 18513738.
- Ansari, Daniel (April 2008). "Effects of development and enculturation on number representation in the brain". Nature Reviews Neuroscience. 9 (4): 278–291. doi:10.1038/nrn2334. ISSN 1471-0048. PMID 18334999. S2CID 15766398.
- De Smedt, Bert; Noël, Marie-Pascale; Gilmore, Camilla; Ansari, Daniel (1 June 2013). "How do symbolic and non-symbolic numerical magnitude processing skills relate to individual differences in children's mathematical skills? A review of evidence from brain and behavior". Trends in Neuroscience and Education. 2 (2): 48–55. doi:10.1016/j.tine.2013.06.001. ISSN 2211-9493. S2CID 4833449.
- Ansari, Daniel; Coch, Donna (April 2006). "Bridges over troubled waters: education and cognitive neuroscience". Trends in Cognitive Sciences. 10 (4): 146–151. doi:10.1016/j.tics.2006.02.007. hdl:10818/33665. PMID 16530462. S2CID 8328331.
- Thomas, Michael S. C.; Annaz, Dagmara; Ansari, Daniel; Scerif, Gaia; Jarrold, Chris; Karmiloff-Smith, Annette (April 2009). "Using Developmental Trajectories to Understand Developmental Disorders". Journal of Speech, Language, and Hearing Research. 52 (2): 336–358. doi:10.1044/1092-4388(2009/07-0144). ISSN 1092-4388. PMID 19252129.
- Price, Gavin R.; Holloway, Ian; Räsänen, Pekka; Vesterinen, Manu; Ansari, Daniel (December 2007). "Impaired parietal magnitude processing in developmental dyscalculia". Current Biology. 17 (24): R1042–R1043. Bibcode:2007CBio...17R1042P. doi:10.1016/j.cub.2007.10.013. PMID 18088583.
- Grabner, Roland H.; Ansari, Daniel; Koschutnig, Karl; Reishofer, Gernot; Ebner, Franz; Neuper, Christa (January 2009). "To retrieve or to calculate? Left angular gyrus mediates the retrieval of arithmetic facts during problem solving". Neuropsychologia. 47 (2): 604–608. doi:10.1016/j.neuropsychologia.2008.10.013. PMID 19007800. S2CID 11149677.
- Ansari, Daniel; Garcia, Nicolas; Lucas, Elizabeth; Hamon, Kathleen; Dhital, Bibek (7 November 2005). "Neural correlates of symbolic number processing in children and adults". NeuroReport. 16 (16): 1769–1773. doi:10.1097/01.wnr.0000183905.23396.f1. ISSN 0959-4965. PMID 16237324. S2CID 42503588.
- Lyons, Ian M.; Price, Gavin R.; Vaessen, Anniek; Blomert, Leo; Ansari, Daniel (September 2014). "Numerical predictors of arithmetic success in grades 1–6". Developmental Science. 17 (5): 714–726. doi:10.1111/desc.12152. ISSN 1363-755X. PMID 24581004.
- Grabner, Roland H.; Ansari, Daniel; Reishofer, Gernot; Stern, Elsbeth; Ebner, Franz; Neuper, Christa (1 November 2007). "Individual differences in mathematical competence predict parietal brain activation during mental calculation". NeuroImage. 38 (2): 346–356. doi:10.1016/j.neuroimage.2007.07.041. ISSN 1053-8119. PMID 17851092. S2CID 18960661.
