= An Elusive Science =

2000 book by Ellen Lagemann

- First edition
- Author: Ellen Condliffe Lagemann
- Subject: Education research
- Published: 2000 (University of Chicago Press)
- Pages: 302
- ISBN: 0-226-46772-4

An Elusive Science: The Troubling History of Education Research is a history of American education research written by Ellen Condliffe Lagemann and published by University of Chicago Press in 2000.
