= Specialist in Psychology =

Academic degree

The Specialist in Psychology (PsyS or Psy.S.) is a post-masters specialist degree in psychology, and is usually specialized in school psychology. The degree is a three-year program, the first two years earning a Master's (usually in general psychology, developmental psychology, or school psychology) and the last year earning the specialist degree. As a whole, the degree includes two years of course work (including practice) and a one-year internship.

This degree is primarily designed for practicing in the school setting, although after three years of post-grad field work one can operate in private practice in some states. This degree is not designed for those who would like to attain a PhD, however, it is possible to switch over some credits in search of an EdD after the PsyS is completed.

This degree entails two years of course work including a clinical practicum and is often the first part of a four-year PsyD degree. The PsyD is a degree specializing in clinical psychology training, in lieu of the more research based PhD.

This degree should not be confused with the Specialist Psychologist degree conferred in Denmark, which corresponds to a full PsyD or DClinPsy degree in the U.S./UK.

Also, this degree should not be confused with the Specialist Degree in the Commonwealth of Independent States. The Diploma of Specialist (Russian: диплом специалиста • diplóm specialísta) is a five-year higher-education diploma that was the only first higher-education diploma in the former Soviet Union (the Candidate of Sciences was the first academic level degree while the Doctor of Sciences was the highest academic credential) and continues to be offered throughout the USSR successor states in parallel with the new bachelor's degree. In terms of the number of instructional hours it is typically, 35 to 42 classroom hours per week, 34 weeks of instruction plus 6 weeks of exams per academic year. Commonly referred to simply as "Diploma" (Russian: диплом • diplóm), the Soviet/Russian-style Diploma of Specialist is believed to have originated in the engineering education in the Russian Empire. According to the Ministry of Education and Science of Russia, the specialist degree called qualification (degree) of "specialist" (Russian: квалификация (степень) "специалист" • kvalifikacija (stepenʹ) "specialist").

== See also ==
- Psychologist
