= School pedagogy =

Branch of pedagogy

School pedagogy is a thematic field of pedagogy (educational sciences). As a scientific field, school pedagogy deals at a theoretical and practical level with the development and interaction of scientific concepts related to the organization of school life and teaching. School pedagogy, as a field related to the functions mentioned above, was initially introduced in Germany and later spread to other European countries.

== Definition ==
School pedagogy is a field of study that explores the methods and strategies employed in teaching and learning within a school setting. It encompasses the research, development, and evaluation of teaching practices, assessing their effectiveness and impact on student development. This branch of pedagogy considers various dimensions of the teaching and learning process, including both theoretical and practical approaches. It encompasses classroom organization, the use of instructional materials, integration of technologies, the cultivation of teacher-student relationships, and the assessment of learning outcomes.

A comprehensive understanding of school pedagogy and its research themes is only possible within the context of general pedagogy as a science of education and upbringing, since this scientific discipline is relatively new (compared to philosophy and medicine, for example). It experienced its initial affirmation only in the 19th century and achieved rapid expansion only after the Second World War, particularly in the 1970s. School pedagogy as a scientific discipline is primarily interconnected with the pedagogical sciences, especially didactics, general pedagogy, comparative pedagogy, the history of education and pedagogy, and the methodology of pedagogical research. It also has strong connections with psychology (school psychology), sociology (sociology of education), philosophy (philosophy of education), and logic.

== Goals ==
The primary goal of school pedagogy is to ensure high-quality teaching and learning processes, fostering the development of students' intellectual, emotional, and social abilities. It actively engages in assessing changes in students' needs and adapts teaching methods and strategies accordingly. School pedagogy is dynamic, continuously evolving to embrace new developments in education and incorporating technology and innovative teaching practices. It acknowledges the multifaceted role of the teacher as an organizer, leader, and motivator in the learning process, while also recognizing students as active participants in their own learning.

Aligned with the philosophy of education, school pedagogy promotes values such as curiosity, creativity, lifelong learning skills, cooperation, and mutual understanding among students. Its overarching aim is to empower students to develop self-awareness as learners and to be equipped to support the development and success of their future students. This comprehensive approach ensures a holistic and effective educational experience within the school environment.

== See also ==
- School
- Pedagogy
- Antipedagogy
- Critical pedagogy
