= Psychology in the Schools =

- Discipline: Psychology
- Language: English
- Edited by: David E. McIntosh

Publication details
- History: 1964-present
- Publisher: Wiley-Blackwell
- Frequency: 10/year
- Impact factor: 1.923 (2021)

Standard abbreviations
- ISO 4: Psychol. Sch.

Indexing
- ISSN: 0033-3085 (print); 1520-6807 (web)
- LCCN: 64009353
- OCLC no.: 1763062

Links
- Journal homepage; Online access; Online archive

Psychology in the Schools is a peer-reviewed academic journal published ten times per year by Wiley-Blackwell. It was established in 1964 and the editor-in-chief is David E. McIntosh (Ball State University). The journal covers school psychology.

According to the Journal Citation Reports, the journal has a 2021 impact factor of 1.923.
