= School Psychology International =

- Discipline: School psychology
- Language: English
- Edited by: Amity Noltemeyer

Publication details
- History: 1979-present
- Publisher: SAGE Publications
- Frequency: Bimonthly
- Impact factor: 1.447 (2014)

Standard abbreviations
- ISO 4: Sch. Psychol. Int.

Indexing
- ISSN: 0143-0343 (print); 1461-7374 (web)
- LCCN: 91662314
- OCLC no.: 709978723

Links
- Journal homepage; Online access; Online archive

School Psychology International is a bimonthly peer-reviewed academic journal that highlights the concerns of those who provide quality mental health, educational, therapeutic, and support services to schools and their communities throughout the world. It offers peer-reviewed articles reflecting high quality academic research in the field as well as examples of proven best practice. This journal is a member of the Committee on Publication Ethics (COPE). The journal was established in 1979 and is currently published by SAGE Publications.

School Psychology International Editors
| Title | Name | Institution |
|---|---|---|
| Editor-in-Chief | Amity Noltemeyer | Miami University, Oxford, USA |
| Editor Emeritus | Caven S. Mcloughlin | Kent State University, Ohio, USA |
| Senior Associate Editor | Wan Har Chong | National Institute of Education, Singapore |
| Senior Associate Editor | Gregory Arief D. Liem | National Institute of Education, Singapore |
| Senior Associate Editor for Online Materials and Social Media | Courtney L. McLaughlin | Indiana University of Pennsylvania, USA |
| Assistant for Online Materials and Social Media | Adrienne Bardo | Indiana University of Pennsylvania, USA |
| Assistant to the Editorial Board | Sarah Bidwell | Miami University, USA |

== Abstracting and indexing ==
School Psychology International is abstracted and indexed in:

- Academic Search Premier
- Applied Social Sciences Index & Abstracts
- British Education Index
- Child Development Abstracts & Bibliography
- Criminal Justice Abstracts
- Cumulative Index to Nursing and Allied Health Literature
- Current Contents/Social and Behavioral Sciences
- e-Psyche
- ERIC
- Family Index
- International Bibliography of Periodical Literature in the Humanities and Social Sciences
- International Bibliography of Book Reviews of Scholarly Literature in the Humanities and Social Sciences
- Linguistics and Language Behavior Abstracts
- Psychological Abstracts
- PsycINFO
- Scopus
- Social Sciences Citation Index

According to the Journal Citation Reports, its 2014 impact factor is 1.447, ranking it 26th out of 55 journals in the category "Psychology, Educational".

== Notable articles ==
- The three most-cited (>20 times) articles in School Psychology International are:
1. Craig, W.; Pepler, D.; Atlas, R. (2000). "Observations of Bullying in the Playground and in the Classroom". School Psychology International. 21 (1): 22–36. doi:10.1177/0143034300211002. S2CID 146140435.
2. Li, Q. (2006). "Cyberbullying in Schools: A Research of Gender Differences". School Psychology International. 27 (2): 157–170. doi:10.1177/0143034306064547. S2CID 145534926.
3. Huebner, E. S. (1991). "Initial Development of the Student's Life Satisfaction Scale". School Psychology International. 12 (3): 231–240. doi:10.1177/0143034391123010. S2CID 145578558.

- The three most-read articles in School Psychology International are:
1. Cassidy, W.; Faucher, C.; Jackson, M. (2013). "Cyberbullying among youth: A comprehensive review of current international research and its implications and application to policy and practice". School Psychology International. 34 (6): 575–612. doi:10.1177/0143034313479697. S2CID 145324847.
2. Li, Q. (2006). "Cyberbullying in Schools: A Research of Gender Differences". School Psychology International. 27 (2): 157–170. doi:10.1177/0143034306064547. S2CID 145534926.
3. You, S.; Kim, E.; No, U. (2015). "Impact of violent video games on the social behaviors of adolescents: The mediating role of emotional competence". School Psychology International. 36 (1): 94–111. doi:10.1177/0143034314562921. S2CID 145498523.
