= School Psychological Examiner =

In the United States education system, School Psychological Examiners assess the needs of students in schools for special education services or other interventions. The post requires a relevant postgraduate qualification and specialist training. This role is distinct from school psychology, as school psychological examiners are typically added certificate programs providing existing educators with additional training in cognitive and academic assessment, where school psychologists have a high level of training, practicum experience, and internship that leads to state and sometimes national certification as a school psychologist.

== Role of Psychological Examiners in schools ==
School Psychological Examiners are assessors licensed by a State Department of Education to work with students from pre-kindergarten to twelfth grade in public schools, interviewing, observing, and administering and interpreting standardized testing instruments that measure cognitive and academic abilities, or describe behavior, personality characteristics, attitude or aptitude, in order to determine eligibility for special education services, placement, or conduct re-evaluation, or occupational guidance and planning.

The work of the School Psychological Examiners is both qualitative and quantitative in nature. They prepare psychoeducational evaluation reports based on test results and interpretation. Integrated with case history, the evaluation reports should present an accurate and clear profile of a student’s level of functioning or disability, strengths and weaknesses, compare test results with the standards of the evaluation instruments, analyze potential test biases, and develop appropriate recommendations to help direct educational interventions and services in a most inclusive and least restrictive environment. Evaluation reports are framed by laws and regulations applicable to testing and assessment in special education, and must follow school district policies and the codes of ethics applicable to education, special education, and psychological assessment.

School Psychological Examiners also provide psychoeducational interventions such as consultation services, collaboration in behavior management planning and monitoring, and devising social skills training programs in public schools.

Unless additionally trained and licensed, School Psychological Examiners do not offer or provide psychotherapy or clinical diagnostic/treatment services, which are attributions of licensed psychiatrists and clinical psychologists, as provided by law and professional regulations.

== Qualifications ==
School Psychological Examiners are highly trained and experienced educators who hold a master’s or higher degree in education or school counseling and at least one endorsement in special education. In addition to school district policies, School Psychological Examiners are bound by professional regulations, as well as by the ethical codes of testing and measurement. Other designations for School Psychological Examiners include ‘Educational Examiners’ or ‘Psychoeducational Examiners.’ Designation of this specialty varies among different school districts.

'Psychometrist,’ from the term psychometrics, is an occupational designation not inclusive of the broader faculties of School Psychological Examiners. Psychometrists deal exclusively with quantitative test administration, do not require coursework beyond the bachelor's level, or licensure by a state department of education. Training of psychometrists is primarily done on-the-job, and their services are valuable in mental health community agencies, assessment and institutional research, or test-producing companies, etc., rather than in K-12 schools.

== Graduate Training and Licensure of School Psychological Examiners ==
Typical training includes coursework beyond the Master of Education, Master of Science in Education, or Master of Arts in Teaching degrees. Currently, School Psychological Examiners complete the courses required by their state department of education rather than by a prescribed self-contained program of studies. The coursework is equivalent to an entire Specialist or Doctoral Degree; unfortunately just a handful of institutions of higher education offer this kind of self-standing graduate program. Graduate courses of a psychological nature include:

- Special Education Law
- Advanced Child and Adolescent Growth and Development
- Psychology of Students with Exceptionalities
- Abnormal Child and Adult Psychology
- Advanced Statistics and Research in Education and Psychology
- Tests and measurements
- Assessment and Evaluation of the Individual
- Individual Intelligence quotient
- Group Assessment
- Diagnostics and Remedial Reading
- Ethical issues in education and psychological measurement and evaluation reporting
- Methods of Instructing Students with Mild/Moderate Disabilities
- Methods of Instructing Students with Severe to Profound Disabilities
- Survey of Guidance and Counseling Techniques
- Practicum for School Psychological Examiners (150 supervised contact hours).

Licensure as School Psychological Examiner demands experience in a special education or school counseling setting, satisfactory completion of the required graduate coursework and practicum, plus a passing score on the 'Praxis II Special Education: Knowledge-Based Core Principles'. Graduate school recommendation and verification of experience by the employing school district complete the requirements. In addition to the practicum, on-the-job mentoring supervision for at least two school years, sometimes four years, allows the transition from initial licensure to standard professional licensure. An annual professional development plan and ongoing performance-based evaluation ensure 'High Quality' professionalism as required by the No Child Left Behind law and related regulations.

== Competencies ==
The clinical and technical skills needed to be a competent behavioral and clinical assessor include the abilities to do the following:

1. Establish and maintain rapport with children, parents, and teachers
2. Use effective assessment techniques appropriate for evaluating children’s behavior
3. Use effective techniques for obtaining accurate and complete information from parents and teachers
4. Evaluate the psychometric properties of tests and other measures
5. Select an appropriate assessment battery
6. Administer and score tests and other assessment tools by following standardized procedures
7. Observe and evaluate behavior objectively
8. Perform informal assessments
9. Interpret assessment results
10. Use assessment findings to develop effective interventions
11. Communicate assessment findings effectively, both orally and in writing
12. Adhere to ethical standards
13. Read and interpret research in behavioral and clinical assessment
14. Keep up with laws and regulations concerning the assessment and placement of children with special needs.

— Sattler, J. M. & Hoge, R. D. (2006). Assessment of Children: Behavioral, Social, and Clinical Foundations. (5th Ed). San Diego, CA: Jerome M. Sattler Publisher, Inc. p. 2.

Additionally, high quality School Psychological Examiners exhibit proficiency-level knowledge on:

- The provisions of the Individuals with Disabilities Act and the Section 504 of the Civil Rights Act and related
- State and federal laws, and all the applicable regulations, policies, and standards pertaining the provision of psychosocial and educational services to disabled individuals
- Children and adolescents' advanced development and behavior
- Multicultural factors in attitudes and behaviors
- Analysis and diagnosis of learning problems including special consideration of low incidence populations
- Integration of knowledge, facts, and theory on classroom environment, psychosocial principles, and test results, to plan for prescriptive instruction, management, and education of students with special needs
- Focused and methodical psychoeducational evaluation reporting, providing sound and accurate information and research-based remediation recommendations to improve individual student's learning, achievement, and behavioral performance
- Teamwork and collaboration for the process of staffing with other school professionals and collaborative development of instructional strategies for students with special needs
- Provision of assistance with instructional modifications or accommodations, and programming or transition recommendations for the Individualized Education Program (IEP)
- Accountability for the monitoring and outcome assessment of services and interventions.

== Evaluation standards ==
Evaluation standards provide guidelines for designing, implementing, assessing, and reporting the psychoeducational evaluation reported by school psychological examiners. The evaluation is informed by professional codes of ethics.

- Standards for Qualifications of Test Users
- Code of Fair Testing Practices in Education
- Standards for Multicultural Assessment
- Standards for Educational and Psychological Testing

== See also ==
- Educational assessment
- Psychological evaluation
- Standardized test
- Intelligence quotient
- Individual assessment
- Psychoeducational interventions
- Psychosocial interventions
- School counselor
- Individuals with Disabilities Education Act - IDEA
- Special education
- Individualized Education Program - IEP
- Section 504 of The Civil Rights Act.
