= Berdyash, Karaidelsky District, Republic of Bashkortostan =

Berdyash Бердяш
- Selo
- Location within Bashkortostan Location within Russia
- Coordinates: 55°47′N 56°56′E
- Country: Russia
- Region: Bashkortostan
- District: Karaidelsky District
- Time zone: UTC+5:00

Berdyash (Russian: Бердяш; Bashkir: Бәрҙәш, romanized: Bərðəş) is a rural locality (a selo) in Baykinsky Selsoviet, Karaidelsky District, Bashkortostan, Russia. The population was 154 as of 2010. There are 15 streets.

== Geography ==
Berdyash is located 18 km southeast of Karaidel (the district's administrative centre) by road. Abyzovo is the nearest rural locality.
