= Journal of Advanced Academics =

- Discipline: Education
- Language: English
- Edited by: Michael S. Matthews, Matthew McBee

Publication details
- History: 1989-present
- Publisher: SAGE Publications
- Frequency: Quarterly

Standard abbreviations
- ISO 4: J. Adv. Acad.

Indexing
- ISSN: 1932-202X (print); 2162-9536 (web)
- LCCN: 2006214689
- OCLC no.: 168250276

Links
- Journal homepage; Online access; Online archive

The Journal of Advanced Academics is a quarterly peer-reviewed academic journal covering the field of gifted education, including broader issues in the education of academically advanced learners, such as advanced placement and international baccalaureate programming, academically focused charter and magnet schools, and honors programming in the college or university setting. The editors-in-chief are Todd Kettler (Baylor University) and Anne N. Rinn (University of North Texas). The journal was established in 1989 and is published by SAGE Publications.

== Abstracting and indexing ==
The journal is abstracted and indexed in:

- Academic Search Complete
- Academic Search Premier
- Education Research Complete
- PsycINFO
- Zetoc
