= School psychology challenges and benefits =

Branch of psychology

School psychology

School psychology is a field that applies principles from educational psychology, developmental psychology, community psychology, and behavior analysis to meet the learning and behavioral health needs of children and adolescents. It is an area of applied psychology practiced by a school psychologist. They often collaborate with educators, families, school leaders, community members, and other professionals to create safe and supportive school environments. School psychologists may be certified by state departments of education (at the specialist and doctoral level) and/or licensed by state departments of health (at the doctoral level only). At the doctoral level, school psychologists operate under the same license as clinical psychologists and counseling psychologists.

They carry out psychological testing, psychoeducational assessment, intervention, prevention, counseling, and consultation in the ethical, legal, and administrative codes of their profession.

It combines ideas from different types of psychology to help students succeed in school. These professionals focus on both learning and behavior. They support students who are struggling with academic skills, emotional issues, or social challenges. They work with teachers and families to find the best ways to help each student. By creating safe, supportive school environments, school psychologists help all students reach their full potential.

== Historical foundations ==
School psychology dates back to the beginning of American psychology in the late 19th and early 20th centuries. The field is tied to both functional and clinical psychology. School psychology actually came out of functional psychology. School psychologists were interested in childhood behaviors, learning processes, and dysfunction with life or in the brain itself. They wanted to understand the causes of the behaviors and their effects on learning.

In addition to its origins in functional psychology, school psychology is also the earliest example of clinical psychology, beginning around 1890. While both clinical and school psychologists wanted to help improve the lives of children, they approached it in different ways. School psychologists were in fact concerned with school learning and childhood behavioral problems, which largely contrasts the mental health focus of clinical psychologists.

Another significant event in the foundation of school psychology as it is today was the Thayer Conference. The Thayer Conference was first held in August 1954 in West Point, New York in Hotel Thayer. The 9 day-long conference was conducted by the American Psychological Association (APA). The purpose of the conference was to develop a position on the roles, functions, and necessary training and credentialing of a school psychologist. At the conference, forty-eight participants that represented practitioners and trainers of school psychologists discussed the roles and functions of a school psychologist and the most appropriate way to train them.

At the time of the Thayer Conference, school psychology was still a very young profession with only about 1,000 school psychology practitioners. One of the goals of the Thayer Conference was to define school psychologists. The agreed upon definition stated that school psychologists were psychologists who specialize in education and have specific knowledge of assessment and learning of all children. School psychologists use this knowledge to assist school personnel in enriching the lives of all children. This knowledge is also used to help identify and work with children with exceptional needs. It was discussed that a school psychologist must be able to assess and develop plans for children considered to be at risk. A school psychologist is also expected to better the lives of all children in the school; therefore, it was determined that school psychologists should be advisors in the planning and implementation of school curriculum. Participants at the conference felt that since school psychology is a specialty, individuals in the field should have completed a two-year graduate training program or a four-year doctoral program. Participants felt that states should be encouraged to establish certification standards to ensure proper training. It was also decided that a practicum experience be required to help facilitate experiential knowledge within the field.

The Thayer Conference is one of the most significant events in the history of school psychology because it was there that the field was initially shaped into what it is today. Before the Thayer Conference defined school psychology, practitioners used seventy-five different professional titles. By providing one title and a definition, the conference helped to get school psychologists recognized nationally. Since a consensus was reached regarding the standards of training and major functions of a school psychologist, the public can now be assured that all school psychologists are receiving adequate information and training to become a practitioner. It is essential that school psychologists meet the same qualifications and receive appropriate training nationwide. These essential standards were first addressed at the Thayer Conference. At the Thayer Conference some participants felt that in order to hold the title of a school psychologist an individual must have earned a doctoral degree.

The issues of titles, labels, and degree levels are still debated among psychologists today. However, APA and NASP reached a resolution on this issue for the US in 2010.

== Social reform in the early 1900s ==
The late 19th century marked the era of social reforms directed at children. It was due to these social reforms that the need for school psychologists emerged. These social reforms included compulsory schooling, juvenile courts, child labor laws as well as a growth of institutions serving children. Society was starting to "change the 'meaning of children' from an economic source of labor to a psychological source of love and affection". Historian Thomas Fagan argues that the preeminent force behind the need for school psychology was compulsory schooling laws. Prior to the compulsory schooling law, only 20% of school aged children completed elementary school and only 8% completed high school. Due to the compulsory schooling laws, there was an influx of students with mental and physical defects who were required by law to be in school. There needed to be an alternative method of teaching for these different children. Between 1910 and 1914, schools in both rural and urban areas created small special education classrooms for these children. From the emergence of special education classrooms came the need for "experts" to help assist in the process of child selection for special education. Thus, school psychology was founded.

== Important contributors to the founding ==
=== Lightner Witmer ===
Lightner Witmer has been acknowledged as the founder of school psychology. Witmer was a student of both Wilhelm Wundt and James Mckeen Cattell. While Wundt believed that psychology should deal with the average or typical performance, Cattell's teachings emphasized individual differences. Witmer followed Cattell's teachings and focused on learning about each individual child's needs. Witmer opened the first psychological and child guidance clinic in 1896 at the University of Pennsylvania. Witmer's goal was to prepare psychologists to help educators solve children's learning problems, specifically those with individual differences. Witmer became an advocate for these special children. He was not focused on their deficits per se, but rather helping them overcome them, by looking at the individual's positive progress rather than all they still could not achieve. Witmer stated that his clinic helped "to discover mental and moral defects and to treat the child in such a way that these defects may be overcome or rendered harmless through the development of other mental and moral traits". He strongly believed that active clinical interventions could help to improve the lives of the individual children.

Since Witmer saw much success through his clinic, he saw the need for more experts to help these individuals. Witmer argued for special training for the experts working with exceptional children in special educational classrooms. He called for a "new profession which will be exercised more particularly in connection with educational problems, but for which the training of the psychologist will be a prerequisite".

As Witmer believed in the appropriate training of these school psychologists, he also stressed the importance of appropriate and accurate testing of these special children. The IQ testing movement was sweeping through the world of education after its creation in 1905. However, the IQ test negatively influenced special education. The IQ test creators, Lewis Terman and Henry Goddard, held a nativist view of intelligence, believing that intelligence was inherited and difficult if not impossible to modify in any meaningful way through education. These notions were often used as a basis for excluding children with disabilities from the public schools. Witmer argued against the standard pencil and paper IQ and Binet type tests in order to help select children for special education. Witmer's child selection process included observations and having children perform certain mental tasks.

=== Granville Stanley Hall ===
Another important figure to the origin of school psychology was Granville Stanley Hall. Rather than looking at the individual child as Witmer did, Hall focused more on the administrators, teachers and parents of exceptional children. He felt that psychology could make a contribution to the administrator system level of the application of school psychology. Hall created the child study movement, which helped to invent the concept of the "normal" child. Through Hall's child study, he helped to work out the mappings of child development and focused on the nature and nurture debate of an individual's deficit. Hall's main focus of the movement was still the exceptional child despite the fact that he worked with atypical children.

=== Arnold Gesell ===
Bridging the gap between the child study movement, clinical psychology and special education, Arnold Gesell, was the first person in the United States to officially hold the title of school psychologist. He successfully combined psychology and education by evaluating children and making recommendations for special teaching. Arnold Gesell paved the way for future school psychologists.

=== Gertrude Hildreth ===
Gertrude Hildreth was a psychologist with the Lincoln School at Teacher's College, Columbia then at Brooklyn College in New York. She authored many books including the first book pertaining to school psychology titled, "Psychological Service for School Problems" written in 1930. The book discussed applying the science of psychology to address the perceived problems in schools. The main focus of the book was on applied educational psychology to improve learning outcomes. Hildreth listed 11 problems that can be solved by applying psychological techniques, including: instructional problems in the classroom, assessment of achievement, interpretation of test results, instructional groupings of students for optimal outcomes, vocational guidance, curriculum development, and investigations of exceptional pupils. Hildreth emphasized the importance of collaboration with parents and teachers. She is also known for her development of the Metropolitan Readiness Tests and for her contribution to the Metropolitan Achievement test. In 1933 and 1939 Hildreth published a bibliography of Mental Tests and Rating Scales encompassing a 50-year time period and over 4,000 titles. She wrote approximately 200 articles and bulletins and had an international reputation for her work in education.

== Controversies and debates ==
=== Assessment process ===
Empirical evidence has not confirmed biases in referral, assessment, or identification. Some have claimed that a better assessment process would not necessarily focus on if a student qualifies for a special education program, but rather the unique learning style of each student, and how to best help them succeed.

The National Research Council has called attention to the questionable reliability of educational decision making in special education as there can be vast numbers of false positives and/or false negatives. Misidentified students in special education is problematic and can contribute to long term negative outcomes. The effects of these outcomes differs based on many factors, including race or location.

During the identification process, school psychologists must consider ecological factors and environmental context such as socioeconomic status. Socioeconomic status may limit funding and materials, impact curriculum quality, increase teacher-to-student ratios, and perpetuate a negative school climate.

=== Technology ===
With the ever growing use of technology, school psychologists are faced with several issues, both ethical and within the populations they try to serve. As it is so easy to share and communicate over technology, concerns are raised as to just how easy it is for outsiders to get access to the private information that school psychologists deal with every day. Thus exchanging and storing information digitally may come under scrutiny if precautions such as password protecting documents and specifically limiting access within school systems to personal files.

Another issue is that of how students communicate using this technology. There are both concerns on how to address these virtual communications and on how appropriate it is to access them. Concerns on where the line can be drawn on where intervention methods end and invasion of privacy begin are raised by students, parents, administrators, and faculty. Addressing these behaviors becomes even more complicated when considering the current methods of treatment for problematic behaviors, and implementation of these strategies can become complex, if not impossible, within the use of technology.

=== Racial disproportionality in special education ===
Disproportionality refers to a group's under or overrepresentation in comparison to other groups within a certain context. In the field of school psychology, disproportionality of minority students in special education is a concern. Special Education Disproportionality has been defined as the relationship between one's membership to a specific group and the probability of being placed in a specific disability category. Systemic prejudice is believed by some to be one of the root causes of the mischaracterization of minority children as being disabled or problematic. "Research on disproportionality in the U.S. context has posited two overlapping types of rationales: those who believed disproportionate representation is linked to poverty and health outcomes versus those who believed in the systemwide racist practices that contributed to over-representation of minority students."

The United States Congress recently received an annual report on the implementation of IDEA which stated that proportionally Native Americans (14.09%) and African Americans (12.61%) were the two most highly represented racial groups within the realm of special education. In particular, African American males have been overidentified as having emotional disturbances and intellectual disabilities. They account for 21% of the special education population with emotional disturbances and 12% with learning disabilities. American Indian and Alaska Native students are also overrepresented in special education. They are shown to be 1.53 times more likely to receive services for various learning disabilities and 2.89 more likely to obtain services targeting developmental delays than all other Non-Native American student groups combined. Overall, Hispanic students are often overidentified for special education in general; however, it is common for them to be under-identified for Autism Spectrum Disorder and speech and language impairments in comparison to White students.

Minority populations often have an increased susceptibility to economic, social and cultural disadvantages that can affect academic achievement. According to the US Department of Education, "Black children were three times as likely to live in poor families as white children in 2015. 12 percent of white and Asian children lived in poor families, compared with 36 percent of black children, 30 percent of Hispanic children, 33 percent of American Indian children, and 19 percent of others." There may be other alternative explanations for behavior and academic performance as well. For example, Black children are twice as likely as Whites to experience heightened levels of lead in the blood due to prolonged lead exposure. Lead poisoning can be known to affect a child's behavior by increasing their levels of irritability, hyperactivity, and inattentiveness even in less severe cases.

=== Cultural bias ===
Some school psychologists realize the need to understand and accept their own cultural beliefs and values in order to understand the impact it may have when delivering services to clients and families. For example, these school psychologists ensure that students who are minorities, including African Americans, Hispanics, Asians, and Native Americans are being equally represented at the system level, in the classroom, and receiving a fair education.

For staff, it is important to reflect one's own culture in the context of diversity, to adapt to diversity and integrate a comprehensive way to understand cultural knowledge. Providing equal opportunities for students can increase the quality of education. Staff members should keep the terms race, privilege, implicit bias, micro aggression, and cultural relevance in mind when thinking about social justice.

== Services ==
=== Roles and Functions ===
School psychologists do many different jobs. They help solve problems like bullying or classroom behavior issues. They also help in emergencies, such as when a student is in crisis or after a tragedy at school. Their goal is always to make sure every student feels safe, supported, and ready to learn. They test students to see how they learn best. They also support students with disabilities by helping to develop Individualized Education Programs (IEPs). They work as part of a team that includes teachers, parents, and special education staff to make sure each student gets the support they need. This might include extra time on tests, speech therapy, behavior plans, or learning accommodations. Their goal is to make education fair and accessible for every student.

In addition to working directly with students, school psychologists train teachers and staff on how to handle classroom challenges and create a positive school climate. They lead programs on topics like conflict resolution, mental health awareness, and effective classroom management. They also help identify school wide trends, such as increases in anxiety or bullying, and create strategies to address these problems at a larger level.

=== Intervention ===
One of the primary roles and responsibilities of school psychologists working in schools is to develop and implement programs geared towards the optimal learning and mental well being of students. School psychologists call these programs 'interventions' when they are implemented in response to a significant issue affecting one or more students. Interventions in school psychology are typically classified as "direct" when practitioners work with students to rectify their own academic or behavioral problems and as "indirect" when they collaborate with the student's family or teachers to correct academic or behavioral problems. Popular intervention formats include individual meetings, school assemblies, parent-teacher conferences, workshops, and awareness campaigns. After significant developments in related psychological fields over the latter half of the twentieth century, school psychologists have begun to move towards intervention frameworks that center on individually tailored assessments and evidence-based interventions, rather than diagnosed disabilities. This is part of a larger movement to expand the role of school psychologists outside of special education.

School psychologists, as researchers and practitioners, can make important contributions to the development and implementation of scientifically based intervention and prevention programs to address learning and behavioral needs of students. Newly designed interventions must be empirically tested through a series of randomized studies conducted by researchers in order to be proven effective for school environments. Evidence-based interventions, known within the field as EBIs, while widely circulated amongst researchers, can be difficult to implement within school environments. This is due in small part to the fledgling nature of school psychology as a field, but also due to the difference between research settings and clinical or classroom settings, with the later being generally more unpredictable and vulnerable to outside influences than the former. Thus, practitioners often modify research-based interventions in order to suit the particular needs of a student or student population.

Intervention and prevention research needs to address a range of questions related not only to efficacy and effectiveness, but also to feasibility given resources, acceptability, social validity, integrity, and sustainability.

A specific example of an intervention that has recently become popular among school psychologists is the School-Wide Positive Behavioral Interventions and Supports (SWPBIS) intervention. The SWPBIS involves a communal effort among school staff to establish school-wide behavioral expectations, which are reinforced by reward systems in order to promote positive forms of coaching and mentorship. Authorized under Individuals with Disabilities Education Improvement Act (IDIEA), the SWPBIS system has been implemented in over 25,000 schools as of 2018. Like other Evidence-based interventions, the SWPBIS has a large body of research supporting its effectiveness in promoting positive academic and interpersonal behaviors among students.

School psychologists are involved in the implementation of academic, behavioral, and social/emotional interventions within a school across a continuum of supports. These systems and policies should convey clear behavior expectations and promote consistency among educators. Continuous reinforcement of positive behaviors can yield extremely positive results. Schoolwide positive behavior supports A systematic approach that proactively promotes constructive behaviors in a school can yield positive outcomes. These programs are designed to improve and support students’ social, behavioral, and learning outcomes by promoting a positive school climate and providing targeted training to students and educators within a school. Data should be collected consistently to assess implementation effectiveness, screen and monitor student behavior, and develop or modify action plans.

Check and Connect

C&C is a structured mentoring intervention to promote student success and engagement at school with learning through relationship building and systematic use of data. It is structured to maximize personal contact and opportunities to build trusting relationships. It was developed in 1990 at the Institute on Community Integration University of Minnesota in collaboration with the Minneapolis Public School System. It emphasizes school completion, with academic, social, and emotional competencies. Students may be referred to the program if they exhibit signs of withdrawal in academic, emotional, or behavioral areas. The team consists of the student, check and connect coordinator, community services, school staff, monitor, and family. The essential components of this intervention are the mentor component, the check component, and the connect component. The program is implemented by a monitor, who serves multiple roles as a mentor, an advocate, and a service coordinator. These serve to build a strong relationship with the student based on mutual trust and open communication, nurtured through a long-term commitment focused on success at school and with learning. The "check" component is observed from the student levels of engagement. These are things such as attendance, suspension, credits, grades, and behavior that are “checked” for progress regularly by mentors and used to guide their efforts to increase and maintain students’ “connection” with the school. The "connect" component is timely, personalized, data-based interventions designed to provide support tailored to individual student needs, based on the student's level of engagement with school. The monitor’s goal is to make education a priority for withdrawn students. This intervention gives students a person to motivate, encourage, and inform them on how important graduating is.

==== Academic interventions ====
Academic interventions can be conceptualized as a set of procedures and strategies designed to improve student performance with the intent of closing the gap between how a student is currently performing and the expectations of how they should be performing. Short term and long term interventions used within a problem-solving model must be evidence-based. This means the intervention strategies must have been evaluated by research that utilized rigorous data analysis and peer review procedures to determine the effectiveness. Implementing evidence-based interventions for behavior and academic concerns requires significant training, skill development, and supervised practice. Linking assessment and intervention is critical for determining that the correct intervention has been chosen. School psychologists have been specifically trained to ensure that interventions are implemented with integrity to maximize positive outcomes for children in a school setting.

=== Assessment ===
Historically, the main role of school psychologists has been to assess and diagnose students with behavioral or learning disabilities and determine their eligibility for exceptional needs programs. Within the contemporary field, the roles and responsibilities of individual practitioners have expanded significantly beyond the service of special needs students; however, assessment remains a central service performed by school psychologists.

Current trends in the field of school psychology call for practitioners to move away from IQ-based assessment practices and encourage assessments that consider students’ individual profiles and attainable, more tailored intervention practices. Individualized education programs (IEPs) are reports summarizing the student’s current performance, goals to guide the student’s progress, and proposed resources to meet any special educational needs.

School psychologists are equipped to provide assessment and to determine when an assessment is warranted. School psychologist have completed in depth advanced preparation in selecting and administering tests as well as interpreting and evaluating information obtained from assessment. Advanced training allows school psychologists to be extremely familiar with the central principles of measurement employing multi-method, multi-source, and multi-setting approaches that are sensitive to contextual influences. They select and use the most appropriate assessment instruments and techniques, for the purpose for which they were designed, and for which there is supporting psychometric evidence. School psychologists are aware of the limitations of assessment and the information that is collected, interpreted, and reported. School psychologists use assessment information in a manner that minimizes the potential for misunderstanding and misuse. School psychologists play a substantial role in data-driven decision-making in each of the following areas: routine decisions, screening, progress monitoring, problem identification, school-wide decisions, problem analysis for instruction, problem analysis for intervention planning, program evaluation, accountability, eligibility, and diagnostic decisions.

=== Systems-level services ===
Leaders in the field of school psychology recognize the practical challenges that school psychologists face when striving for systems-level change and have highlighted a more manageable domain within a systems-level approach – the classroom. Overall, it makes sense for school psychologists to devote considerable effort to monitoring and improving school and classroom-based performance for all children and youth because it has been shown to be an effective preventive approach.

==== Universal screening ====
School psychologists play an important role in supporting youth mental wellness, but identifying youth who are in distress can be challenging. Some schools have implemented universal mental health screening programs to help school psychologists find and help struggling youth. For instance, schools in King County, Washington are using the Check Yourself digital screening tool designed by Seattle Children's Hospital to measure, understand, and nurture individual students’ well-being. Check Yourself collects information about lifestyle, behaviour, and social determinants of health to identify at-risk youth so that school psychologists can intervene and direct youth to the services they need. Mental health screening provides school psychologists with valuable insights so that interventions are better fitted to student needs.

==== Crisis intervention ====
Crisis intervention is an integral part of school psychology. School administrators view school psychologists as the school's crisis intervention "experts". Crisis events can significantly affect a student's ability to learn and function effectively. Many school crisis response models suggest that a quick return to normal rituals and routines can be helpful in coping with crises. The primary goal of crisis interventions is to help crisis-exposed students return to their basic abilities of problem-solving so the student can return to their pre-crisis level of functioning.

==== Prevention ====
A way in which school psychologists can help students is by creating primary prevention programs. Information about prevention should also be connected to current events in the community.

=== Social Justice ===
The three major elements that comprise social justice include equity, fairness, and respect. The concept of social justice includes all individuals having equal access to opportunities and resources. A major component behind social justice is the idea of being culturally aware and sensitive. American Psychological Association (APA) and the National Association of School Psychologists (NASP) both have ethical principles and codes of conduct that present aspirational elements of social justice that school psychologists may abide by. Although ethical principles exist, there is federal legislation that acts accordingly to social justice. For example, the Elementary and Secondary Education Act of 1965 (ESEA) and the Individuals with Disabilities Education Improvement Act of 2004 (IDEA) address issues such as poverty and disability to promote the concept of social justice in schools.

Schools are becoming increasingly diverse with growing awareness of these differences. Cultural diversity factors that can be addressed through social justice practice include race/ethnicity, gender, socioeconomic status (SES), religion, and sexual orientation. With the various elements that can impact a student's education and become a source of discrimination, there is a greater call for the practice of social justice in schools. School psychologists that consider the framework of social justice know that injustices that low SES students face can sometimes be different when compared to high SES students.

=== Advocacy ===
A major role of school psychologists involves advocating and speaking up for individuals as needed. Advocacy can be done at district, regional, state, or national level. School psychologists advocate for students, parents, and caregivers.

Consultation and collaboration are key components of school psychology and advocacy. There may be times when school personnel may not agree with the school psychologist. Differing opinions can be problematic because a school psychologist advocates for what is in the best interest of the student. School psychologists and staff members can help facilitate awareness through courageous conversations.

=== Current issues and Challenges ===
In recent years, there has been a growing concern about the mental health of children and adolescents in schools. More students are experiencing anxiety, depression, and other emotional challenges that affect their learning and daily functioning. At the same time, many schools lack the resources and staff to provide timely support. School psychologists are often called upon to respond to these needs, but shortages in the profession make it difficult to reach every student in need.

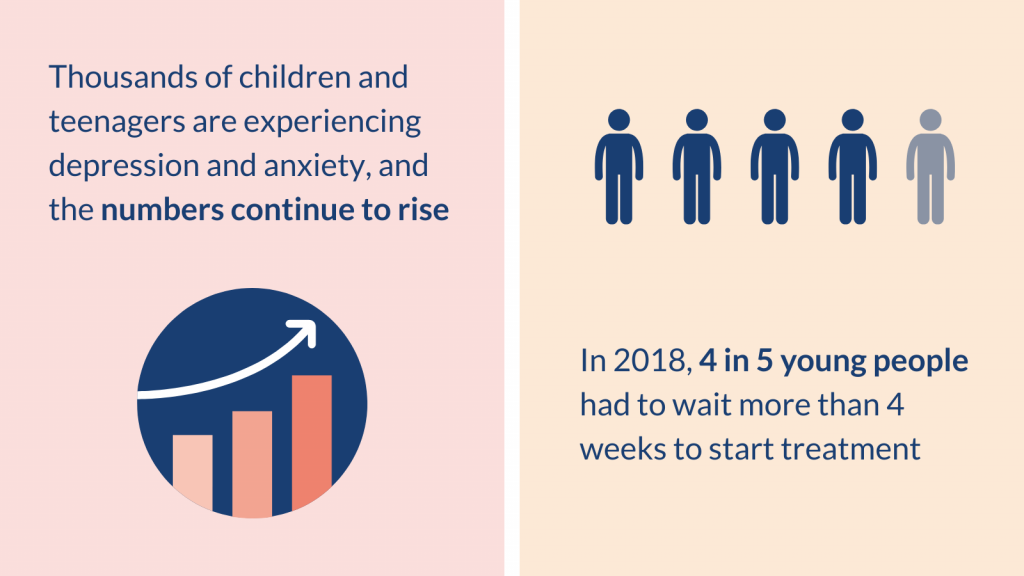
Highlights rising rates of depression and anxiety among children and teens.

According to national data, mental health concerns continue to increase, and most young people face long waits before they can access treatment. These challenges emphasize the growing need for more trained school psychologists and stronger mental health support systems in schools across the country.

=== Multicultural competence ===
School psychologists offer many types of services in order to be multiculturally competent. Multicultural competence extends to race, ethnicity, social class, gender, religion, sexual orientation, disability, age, and geographic region. Because the field of school psychology serves such a diverse range of students, maintaining representation for minority groups continues to be a priority. Despite such importance, history has seen an underrepresentation of culturally and linguistically diverse (CLD) school psychologists. which may appear alarming given that the diversity of our youth continues to increase exponentially. Thus, current professionals in the field have prioritized the acquisition of CLD school psychologists. School psychologists are trained to use their skills, knowledge, and professional practices in promoting diversity and advocating for services for all students, families, teachers, and schools. School psychologists may also work with teachers and educators to provide an integrated multicultural education classroom and curriculum that allows more students to be represented in learning. Efforts to increase multicultural perspectives among school psychologists have been on the rise to account for the increased diversity within schools. Such efforts include establishing opportunities for individuals representative of minority groups to become school psychologists and implementing a diverse array of CLD training programs within the field.

== Education ==
In order to become a school psychologist, one must first learn about school psychology by successfully completing a graduate-level training program. A B.A. or B.S. is not sufficient.

Typically, students pursuing a career in school psychology complete either a Specialist-level (Ed.S.) or Doctoral-level (Ph.D. or Psy.D.) program in school psychology. These programs provide a blend of coursework and practical experience. The coursework often covers areas such as assessment techniques, child development, counseling methods, and legal and ethical issues in education. Many programs also require students to engage in hands-on training through practicum placements in schools.

In addition to completing coursework and practicum experiences, students are required to complete a full-time internship in a school setting. Internships provide real world experience, where students apply what they’ve learned in a practical environment, working directly with students, teachers, and parents.

After completing their degree and internship, most school psychologists must obtain certification or licensure in their state. Certification requirements typically include passing a national exam, such as the Praxis School Psychologist exam. Many school psychologists also choose to maintain their professional development by joining organizations like the National Association of School Psychologists (NASP) and pursuing continuing education throughout their careers.

=== United States ===
School psychology training programs are housed in university schools of education or departments of psychology. School psychology programs require courses, practica, and internships.

==== Degree requirements ====
Specific degree requirements vary across training programs. School psychology training programs offer masters-level (M.A., M.S., M.Ed.), specialist-level degrees (Ed.S., Psy.S., SSP, CAGS), and doctoral-level degrees (Ph.D., Psy.D. or Ed.D.) degrees. Regardless of degree title, a supervised internship is the defining feature of graduate-level training that leads to certification to practice as a school psychologist.

Specialist-level training typically requires 3–4 years of graduate training including a 9-month (1200 hour) internship in a school setting.

Doctoral-level training programs typically require 5–7 years of graduate training. Requirements typically include more coursework in core psychology and professional psychology, more advanced statistics coursework, involvement in research endeavors, a doctoral dissertation, and a one-year (1500+ hour) internship (which may be in a school or other settings such as clinics or hospitals).

In the past, a master's degree was considered the standard for practice in schools. As of 2017, the specialist-level degree is considered the entry-level degree in school psychology. Masters-level degrees in school psychology may lead to obtaining related credentials (such as Educational Diagnostician, School Psychological Examiner, School Psychometrist) in one or two states.

=== International ===
In the UK, the similar practice and study of School Psychology is more often termed Educational Psychology and requires a doctorate (in Educational Psychology) which then enables individuals to register and subsequently practice as a licensed educational psychologist.

== Employment in the United States ==
In the United States, job prospects in school psychology are excellent. Across all disciplines of psychology, the abundance of opportunities is considered among the best for both specialist and doctoral level practitioners. They mostly work in schools. Other settings include clinics, hospitals, correctional facilities, universities, and independent practice.

=== Demographic information ===
According to the NASP Research Committee, 87.5% of school psychologists are female with an average age of 42.7. In 2004–05, average earnings for school practitioners ranged from $56,262 for those with a 180-day annual contract to $68,764 for school psychologists with a 220-day contract. In 2009–10, average earnings for school practitioners ranged from $64,168 for those with a 180-day annual contract to $71,320 for school psychologists with a 200-day contract. In 2019–2020, average earnings for full-time practitioners ranged from $65,397 to $81,458, with a median of $74,000. For university faculty in school psychology, the salary estimate is $77,801.

Based on surveys performed by NASP in 2020–2021, it's shown that 85.7% of school psychologists are white, while minority races and those who chose not to identify their race making up the remaining 14.3%. Of this remaining percentage, the next largest populations represented in school psychology are African-American and multiracial people, at 3.9% and 2.7%, respectively.

=== Shortages in the Field ===
There is a lack of trained school psychologists within the field. While jobs are available across the country, there are just not enough people to fill them.

Due to the low supply and high demand of school psychologists, being a school psychologist is very demanding. School psychologists may feel under pressure to supply adequate mental health and intervention services to the students in their care. Burnout is a risk of being a school psychologist. This risk has increased in recent years due to a shortage of school psychologists nationwide, increases in school enrollment in small cities, and the mental health effects that the COVID-19 pandemic had on children of all ages.

In January, 2022, NASP published updated statistics on the shortages of school psychologists nationwide and per state. NASP states that the recommended ratio of students to school psychologists is 500 to 1, however the national ratio for the 2020-2021 school year was 1162 students per 1 school psychologist. States that currently have the largest ratio between students and school psychologists (>2000 to 1, respectively) are Texas, New Mexico, Arkansas, Oklahoma, Louisiana, Mississippi, Alabama, and Georgia. Alabama has the largest disparity of any state: 369,280 students to 1 school psychologist. As of the publication of this data, Connecticut is the only state meeting NASP standards of a ratio of up to 500 students per 1 school psychologist.

==== Bilingual School Psychologists ====
Approximately 21% of school-age children ages 5–7 speak a language other than English. For this reason, there is an enormous demand for bilingual school psychologists in the United States. The National Association of School Psychologists (NASP) does not currently offer bilingual certification in the field. However, there are a number of professional training opportunities that bilingual LSSPs/School Psychologists can attend in order to prepare to adequately administer assessments. In addition, there are 7 NASP-Approved school psychology programs that offer a bilingual specialization:

- Brooklyn College-City University of New York- Specialist Level
- Gallaudet University- Specialist Level
- Queens College-City University of New York- Specialist Level
- San Diego State University- Specialist Level
- Texas State University- Specialist Level
- University of Colorado Denver- Doctoral Level
- Fordham University- Lincoln Center- Doctoral Level

New York and Illinois are the only two states that offer a bilingual credential for school psychologists.

== School psychology internationally ==
The role of a school psychologist in the United States and Canada may differ considerably from the role of a school psychologist elsewhere. Especially in the United States, the role of school psychologist has been closely linked to public law for education of students with disabilities. In most other nations, this is not the case. Despite this difference, many of the basic functions of a school psychologist, such as consultation, intervention, and assessment are shared by most school psychologists worldwide.

It is difficult to estimate the number of school psychologists worldwide. Recent surveys indicate there may be around 76,000 to 87,000 school psychologists practicing in 48 countries, including 32,300 in the United States and 3,500 in Canada. Following the United States, Turkey has the next largest estimated number of school psychologists (11,327), followed by Spain (3,600), and then both Canada and Japan (3,500 each).

== Credentialing in the United States ==
In most states (excluding Texas and Hawaii), a state education agency credentials school psychologists for practice in the schools.

The Nationally Certified School Psychologist (NCSP) credential is offered by the National Association of School Psychologists (NASP). The NCSP credential is an example of a non-practice credential as holding the NCSP does not make one eligible to provide services without first meeting the state requirements to work as a school psychologist.

State psychology boards (which may go by different names in each state) also offer credentials for school psychologists in some states. For example, Texas offers the LSSP credential which permits licensees to deliver school psychological services within public and private schools.

== Subspecializations in the United States ==
=== Pediatric School Psychology ===
Pediatric School Psychology is a sub-specialty that includes competencies of school, educational, and health psychology. Pediatric school psychologists bring knowledge of human learning and development, as well as understanding of school systems, chronic health conditions, and bio-psycho-social influences. Pediatric school psychologists work across multiple settings and share similar roles. Both professionals focus on prevention and intervention efforts related to students’ behavior, education, and physical health. Additionally, pediatric school psychologists can simplify collaboration between school systems, healthcare providers, and family systems to address the academic, social-emotional, behavioral, and overall health of students. Pediatric school psychologists also contribute to developing and maintaining Tier 1 prevention activities and the facilitation of health promotion programs structured to address the population they are serving.

The field of Pediatric School Psychology is relatively new and requires doctoral level education. Traditional school psychology training programs are beginning to endorse pediatric school psychology subspecializations. For example, the University of South Florida requires students in the School Psychology Ph.D. program to have an area of emphasis, one option being pediatric school psychology. Lehigh University in Pennsylvania has a similar option to complete an endorsement in Pediatric School Psychology as part of their doctoral training, which requires 8 credit hours beyond the regular doctoral requirements. Students at Lehigh University enroll in the Pediatric School Psychology endorsement as a part of the competitive Leadership Training project supported by the U.S. Department of Education.

While the majority of traditional school psychology programs do not offer a subspecialization in pediatric school psychology, this does not necessarily limit students. When a formal subspecialization option is not available, one may request and select field experiences in typical pediatric school psychology settings. Typical settings include hospitals, school-based health clinics, and medical centers. The Pediatric School Psychology Interest Group is an interest group within the National Association of School Psychologists where members can discuss topics related to the subspecialization with experts in the field. The group also holds an annual meeting at the Annual Convention.

=== Behavioral School Psychology ===
Behavioral school psychology uses the same principals as behavioral psychology which dates back to 1913 where it became established by John B. Watson. There are several other thinkers that influenced the field of behavioral psychology. The field really blossomed from the ideas of Ivan Pavlov’s classical conditioning and B.F. Skinner’s operant conditioning. Operant conditioning uses rewards and punishments to increase and decrease behaviors. School psychologists use these ideas to increase positive behaviors and decrease problem behaviors that interfere with a student's learning. While the idea of behavioral psychology has its critics, and a lot of them say there are other factors that go into one’s behaviors, one of the strengths is that behaviors are observable, therefore much easier to measure, collect data and recognize a change.

Behavioral psychology in schools has expanded largely during the last 15 years, because of two main reasons. Inclusive schooling has become increasingly prevalent in today’s world, starting with the “Free and Appropriate Public Education” (FAPE) (1997) requiring that students who have developmental disabilities, cognitive impairments, and behavior disorders will be provided with the opportunity to attend their chosen public schools with their peers who do not have disorders or disabilities. Before the implementation of the regular education initiative (REI), a response to identified problems in the system for educating low-performing children. It was common for this population to be enrolled in private programs or other educational settings other than the public schools with outside resources. Because of the increased enrollment of students with these complications, public schools have recognized the benefits of collaborating with behavior consultants to improve academic instruction and reduce discipline problems. This produces many referrals to professionals who provide consultation as psychologists or behavior specialists affiliated with a private practice, clinic, or human services agency.

=== School Based Mental Health ===
Mental health in children is an important factor that influences success in school and life. If mental health problems within children go unresolved, negative outcomes such as academic and behavior problems can arise. Mental health is not only the absence of mental illness, but also includes social, emotional, and behavioral health, along with the ability to cope with life's challenges. As the need for mental health services for children and youth grow, schools are becoming an ideal place to provide this form of service.

The benefits of addressing mental health problems in the life of a child are significant in a number of different ways. Quality of life for the child increases, physical health can improve, and they have better chances at attaining a quality education, as well as healthy social skills. It is even more cost efficient to address mental health problems in young people than it is later in life.

== Professional organizations ==
=== International ===
- International School Psychology Association

=== National ===
- American Psychological Association's Division 16: School Psychology
- Australian Psychologists and Counsellors in Schools
- Fachgruppe Pädagogische Psychologie ('Educational Psychology Specialty Group') of the Deutsche Gesellschaft für Psychologie ('German Psychological Society')
- Indian School Psychology Association
- National Association of School Psychologists (America)
- New Zealand Psychological Society's Institute of Educational and Developmental Psychology

== Journals ==
- Canadian Journal of School Psychology
- International Journal of School & Educational Psychology
- Journal of Psychoeducational Assessment
- Psychology in the Schools
- School Psychology Forum: Research in Practice
- School Psychology International
- School Psychology Quarterly
- School Psychology Review

== See also ==
- Applied psychology
- School pedagogy
- Educational Psychology
- School Counselor
- School Psychological Examiner
- School Social Worker
- Special Education
- Washington County Closed-Circuit Educational Television Project
- Outline of psychology
