= Journal for the Education of the Gifted =

- Discipline: Education
- Language: English
- Edited by: Jennifer L. Jolly (University of Alabama) & Jennifer H. Robins (Baylor University)

Publication details
- History: 1978-present
- Publisher: SAGE Publications
- Frequency: Quarterly

Standard abbreviations
- ISO 4: J. Educ. Gift.

Indexing
- ISSN: 0162-3532
- LCCN: 78645196
- OCLC no.: 4144776

Links
- Journal homepage

The Journal for the Education of the Gifted is a quarterly peer-reviewed academic journal that covers the field of education. The journal's editors-in-chief are Jennifer L. Jolly and Jennifer H. Robins. It was established in 1978 and is currently published by SAGE Publications. The journal covers research on the educational and psychological needs of gifted and talented children.

== Abstracting and indexing ==
The Journal for the Education of the Gifted is abstracted and indexed in:

- Arts and Humanities Search
- EBSCO
- Educational Research Abstracts Online
- ERIC
- PsycINFO
- Scopus
