= Canadian Journal of School Psychology =

- Discipline: Education
- Language: English
- Edited by: Steven R. Shaw

Publication details
- History: 1985-present
- Publisher: SAGE Publications
- Frequency: Quarterly
- Impact factor: 0.488 (2017)

Standard abbreviations
- ISO 4: Can. J. Sch. Psychol.

Indexing
- ISSN: 0829-5735
- LCCN: cn85035568
- OCLC no.: 13453647

Links
- Journal homepage; Online access; Online archive

The Canadian Journal of School Psychology (CJSP) is a quarterly peer-reviewed academic journal that focuses on the theory, research, and practice of psychology in education. Its editor is Steven R. Shaw, McGill University, Canada. It was established in 1985 and is currently published by SAGE Publications.

== Mission ==
Incorporating the concepts of student wellness. It includes the academic, cognitive, social, and emotional well-being of children and youth within educational settings.

== Abstracting and indexing ==
Canadian Journal of School Psychology is abstracted and indexed in:

- Contents Pages in Education
- Educational Research Abstracts Online
- PsycINFO
- SafetyLit
- Scopus
