= Mind, Brain, and Education =

- Discipline: Psychology
- Language: English
- Edited by: Pat Levitt

Publication details
- History: 2007–present
- Publisher: Wiley-Blackwell on behalf of the International Mind, Brain, and Education Society
- Frequency: Quarterly
- Impact factor: 1.63 (2017)

Standard abbreviations
- ISO 4: Mind Brain Educ.

Indexing
- ISSN: 1751-2271 (print); 1751-228X (web)
- LCCN: 2007235349
- OCLC no.: 123539820

Links
- Journal homepage; Online access; Online archive

Mind, Brain, and Education is a quarterly peer-reviewed academic journal published by Wiley-Blackwell. It was established in 2007 as the official journal of the International Mind, Brain, and Education Society by Kurt W. Fischer (Harvard Graduate School of Education) and David B. Daniel, managing editor. The interdisciplinary journal covers biological and behavioral issues relevant to the broad field of education. The current editor-in-chief is Pat Levitt (University of Southern California). According to the Journal Citation Reports, the journal has a 2017 impact factor of 1.63, ranking it 87th out of 238 journals in the category "Education & Educational Research" and 50th out of 73 journals in the category "Psychology, Developmental".

In 2007, the journal received a PROSE Award in the category "Best New Journal in the Social Sciences & Humanities" from the Association of American Publishers' Professional & Scholarly Publishing Division.
