= Specialist degree =

Academic degree conferred by a college or university

The specialist degree is an academic degree conferred by a college or university. The degree is formatted differently worldwide and may be either a five-year program or a doctoral level graduate program that occurs after a master's degree but before a doctoral degree. In the post-Soviet system, the degree is between a bachelor's and a master's degree.

== By countries ==
=== Commonwealth of Independent States ===
The Diploma of Specialist (Russian: дипло́м специали́ста, romanized: diplóm spetsialísta) is a five-year higher-education diploma that was the only first higher-education diploma in the former Soviet Union (the Candidate of Sciences was the first academic level degree while the Doctor of Sciences was the highest academic credential) and continues to be offered throughout the USSR successor states in parallel with the new bachelor's degree. In terms of the number of instructional hours it is typically, 35 to 42 classroom hours per week, 34 weeks of instruction plus 6 weeks of exams per academic year. Commonly referred to simply as "Diploma" (Russian: дипло́м, romanized: diplóm), the Soviet/Russian-style Diploma of Specialist is believed to have originated in the engineering education in the Russian Empire. According to the Ministry of Education and Science of Russia, the specialist degree called qualification (degree) of "specialist" (Russian: квалификация (степень) "специалист", romanized: kvalifakatsiya (stepen') "spetsialist").

In the early 1990s the bakalavr (бакалавр), bachelor's degree) and magistr (магистр, master's degree) were introduced in all countries of the Commonwealth of Independent States except Turkmenistan and Tajikistan. However, Diploma of Specialist (five years) is still conferred in Belarus, Russia and Tajikistan. The Diploma of Specialist was discontinued in the following countries: Kazakhstan (2004), Ukraine (2017), Georgia, Azerbaijan, Uzbekistan, and Moldova.

Under the Federal Law on Education of Russia, the Diploma of Specialist requires a minimum of five years of study.

Below are some examples of Diploma of Specialist programs in the former USSR and Russia:

- Diploma of Economist (Russian: диплом экономиста, romanized: diplom ekonomista) – first degree in economy or management (including engineering management).
- Diploma of Engineer (Russian: диплом инженера, romanized: diplom inzhenera) – the engineer's degree in the CIS.
- Diploma of Teacher (Russian: диплом учителя, romanized: diplom uchitelya) – the first degree for teachers.
- Diploma of Physician (Russian: диплом врача, romanized: diplom vracha) – this degree type includes the respective degrees of physicians, dentists and veterinarians in the CIS; the equivalent degree in the U.S. is typically titled M.D.
- Diploma of Jurisprudent (Russian: диплом юриста, romanized: diplom yurista) – the first degree in jurisprudence (study of law).
- Diploma of Pharmacist (Russian: диплом фармацевта, romanized: diplom farmatsevta) – the first degree in pharmacy; the equivalent degree in the U.S. is typically titled PharmD.

=== United States ===
In the United States, the Specialist's degree is hierarchically above the master's degree and below the Doctorate. It was invented by colleges and schools of education as an alternative to obtaining a doctorate, and focuses on subjects pertinent to K-12 education - such as leadership and counseling, and educational psychology.

Degrees commonly available include:

- Ed.S or Sp.Ed. – Specialist of Education
- Psy.S. – Specialist in Psychology
- Info.S. – Specialist in Information (offered by the School of Information at Florida State University).
- S.S.P. – Specialist in School Psychology
- Sp.A. – Specialist in Arts (in Special Education; offered by Eastern Michigan University)
- S.C.C.T. – Specialist in Community College Teaching (offered by Arkansas State University)
- S.L.I.S. – Specialist in Library and Information Science (offered by the School of Informatics and Computing at Indiana University Bloomington).

The American Specialist degree typically requires 30 semester hours or 45 quarter hours beyond the master's degree (60 semester hours or 90 quarter hours beyond the Baccalaureate) and can be completed in one to three academic years of continuous full-time or part-time enrolment. Depending on the particular program, practica and / or internship and / or practical field work may be required. Students admitted directly from the baccalaureate may earn a Master's degree in progression toward the Specialist's degree; or the institution may accept applications only from students who already hold a master's degree.

The coursework for an Ed.S. or Sp.A. in Education program is approximately the same workload as a second Master's in terms of credits. But whereas coursework for the initial master's degree is from the introductory and lower intermediate levels of graduate study (e.g. Levels 500 and 600 at institutions that use 100 - 900 level course numbering systems), work for the Specialist's degree will be in the intermediate and upper levels (e.g. 600, 700 and 800 level courses). According to the U.S. Department of Education's International Affairs Office's leaflet, entitled, "Structure of the U.S. Education System: Intermediate Graduate Qualifications," (Feb 2008), the Ed.S., as a degree, is equivalent to the D.Min. or Psy.D. / D.Psy. This reflects the degree's origin as an alternate to professional doctorates.

Ed.S. programs lead to professional degrees in the application of advanced educational theory but do not typically place an emphasis on conducting original research such as in Ed.D. / D.Ed. or Ph.D. programs.

School Psychology and Curriculum and Instruction are two of the most common areas where a specialist degree is found. In the field of school psychology, the degree is typically an Ed.S. or SSP. Despite being virtually identical in scope and function, the Ed.S. and SSP both exist within the field of school psychology because training programs can be offered within the departments of psychology or education. They simply designate the type of program from which the degree originated. As another alternative, some programs within psychology departments have begun offering a Psy.S. degree instead of an SSP.

In many fields outside of education, the postgraduate certificate fills the same need as a Specialist degree - but differs in being an academic certificate rather than an academic degree. Postgraduate or graduate certificates typically require one-third to one-half the coursework of a master's degree and an offered in a specific topical area, such as a Certificate in Historic Preservation.

Certain graduate programs are de facto specialist degrees. In the field of Engineering, the Engineer's degree is a post-Master's degree, offered at a modest number of US universities (but including some prestigious ones such as Stanford and Caltech), which is relatively analogous to the Specialist degree.

=== France ===
In French higher education, the Mastère Spécialisé is a degree designed essentially as a post-Master's degree, offered as a full-time, one-year program (although there are "Executive" versions of this degree, designed for working professionals, which take a little longer to complete). As such, this French degree also forms a close analogy to its US counterpart, although the Mastère Spécialisé is offered in a variety of fields such as business, informatics, and aeronautics.
