= Berdyash, Zilairsky District, Republic of Bashkortostan =

Berdyash Бердяш
- Selo
- Interactive map of Berdyash
- Location of Berdyash Berdyash (Bashkortostan)
- Coordinates: 52°10′39″N 57°12′21″E
- Country: Russia
- Federal subject: Bashkortostan
- Administrative district: Zilairsky District
- SelsovietSelsoviet: Berdyashsky

Population
  - Estimate (2009): 466 )

Administrative status
  - Capital of: Berdyashsky Selsoviet

Municipal status
  - Municipal district: Zilairsky Municipal District
  - Rural settlement: Berdyashsky Rural Settlement
  - Capital of: Berdyashsky Rural Settlement
- Time zone: UTC+5 (MSK+2)
- Postal code: 453685
- OKTMO ID: 80627404101

Berdyash (Russian: Бердяш; Bashkir: Бирҙәш, romanized: Berðəş) is a rural locality (a selo) in Berdyashsky Selsoviet of Zilairsky District of the Republic of Bashkortostan, Russia. Population: 466 (2009 est.); 465 (2002 Census). OKATO code: 80227804001.

The district's population is composed predominantly of Chuvash people at 65%; the Russian population is also significant at 30%. Bashkirs account for 2% of the population.
