= List of people from Dunedin =

The New Zealand city of Dunedin has produced a large number of notable people. Many are natives of the city, while others travelled to Dunedin to be educated at the University of Otago.

== The arts ==
=== Visual arts ===
- Illustrator and engraver John Buckland Wright
- Australian war artist H. Septimus Power was born in Dunedin in 1877
- Cartoonist Colin Wilson
- Caricature artist Murray Webb
- Māori painter Ralph Hotere lived and worked in Port Chalmers
- Painters Grahame Sydney, Jeffrey Harris and Claire Beynon all live in Dunedin
- Pete Wheeler, painter, lived in Dunedin for several years
- Frances Hodgkins (1869–1947), New Zealand's most celebrated expatriate painter, born in Dunedin, trained at the Dunedin School of Art and first matured here as an artist
- Alfred Henry O'Keeffe (1858–1941), prominent artist during the early 20th Century
- Colin McCahon, painter
- Rodney Kennedy, artist, critic, drama director and patron
- Children's book illustrator David Elliot currently lives in Port Chalmers
- Prominent architects Francis Petre, Edmund Anscombe, and Robert Lawson all lived and worked in Dunedin
- Lindsay Daen, sculptor
- Shona McFarlane, artist and journalist who wrote and illustrated "Dunedin, Portrait of a City" (1970, Whitcombe & Tombs, ISBN 0-7233-0171-9)
- Ernest Heber Thompson, artist
- Jan McLean, dollmaker
- Arthur George William Sparrow, commercial artist, photographer and businessman

=== Literature ===
- Thomas Bracken, late-nineteenth century poet who wrote the New Zealand National Anthem God Defend New Zealand and who was the first person to publish the phrase "God's Own Country"
- Nobel Prize short-listee Janet Frame, born there in 1924, died there in 2004: NZ Edge biography.
- Writer James K. Baxter, born in Dunedin in 1926 and wrote many of his plays there in the 1960s in association with Rosalie and Patric Carey's Globe Theatre
- Playwright Roger Hall
- Short story writer O. E. Middleton
- Brian Turner, poet and former Hockey International
- Catherine Chidgey, author, who now lives in Dunedin
- Writer and publisher A.H. Reed
- Philip Temple
- Writer Christine Johnston, author of the novels Shark Bell and Blessed Art Thou Among Women, which won the 1990 Heinemann Reed Fiction Award, and the short-story collection The End of the Century.
- John Sligo, born in Dunedin in 1944. A prolific author, his novel "Final Things" won the NSW Premier's Award for fiction in 1998. He died in Sydney 2010.
- Eileen Louise Soper, wrote for children as Dot of 'Dot's Little Folk' in the Otago Witness.

=== Drama ===
- Bruce Allpress, (1930– 2020) New Zealand actor (Came a Hot Friday, The Lord of the Rings: The Two Towers, The Water Horse)
- Alan Dale, New Zealand actor who also has been on many Australian and U.S. TV shows
- Bridget Armstrong, born 1937; actress.

=== Music ===
- Pianist Arthur Alexander (1891–1969) was born in Dunedin.
- Music teacher Jennie Macandrew (1866–1949) was born in Dunedin.
- Many of New Zealand's top bands of the 1980s and early 1990s started out in Dunedin, establishing the Dunedin sound. These include The Chills, The Clean, Straitjacket Fits, Sneaky Feelings, The 3Ds, Toy Love, the Verlaines and musicians Martin Phillipps and David Kilgour.
- Noise rock band The Dead C formed in Dunedin in 1986.
- Netherworld Dancing Toys active from 1982 to 1985.
- Rock band High Dependency Unit formed in Dunedin in 1994.
- Pat Kraus started his music career in Dunedin.
- Patricia Payne, operatic mezzo-soprano and contralto.
- Maaka Pohatu (Modern Māori Quartet)
- Millie Lovelock (born 1993 or 1994) singer-songwriter-guitarist
- Jonathan Lemalu Baritone Opera Singer.

== Politics and business ==
- A large proportion of the country's leading companies in and beyond the twentieth century originated in Dunedin. A selection of relevant company or brand names includes Arthur Barnett, Cottonsofts, Donaghy, Fletchers, Fisher & Paykel, Fulton Hogan, Hallensteins, Methven, Mosgiel, NZI, Ravensdown, the Union Company of Sir James Mills, RadioWorks (formerly Radio Otago), Wests, Whitcoulls, and Wrightson.
- Dave Cull, Former Mayor of Dunedin (2010-2019)
- Deputy Prime Minister (1999–2008) Michael Cullen
- Pamela Tate SC, appointed Solicitor-General for Victoria, Australia in 2003, was born in Dunedin, and received one of her degrees from the University of Otago.
- Ethel Benjamin, New Zealand's first female lawyer
- Mai Chen, prominent constitutional lawyer
- Bendix Hallenstein, businessman
- Frank Winfird Millar (1885–1944), public servant and union official
- Michael Mayell, entrepreneur and founder of Cookie Time, was born in Dunedin

== Science ==
- Tramway and mining engineer George Smith Duncan
- Two of the founders of modern plastic surgery, Harold Gillies and Archibald McIndoe were born in Dunedin in 1882 and 1900 respectively.
- Popular email program Pegasus Mail was written by David Harris while he was employed by the University of Otago.
- Michael Woodruff a pioneer in the science of organ transplantation
- John Carew Eccles became a professor and head of the Department of Physiology at the University of Otago from 1944 to 1951; before winning the Nobel Prize in Physiology or Medicine in 1963 for describing the electric transmission of impulses along nerves.
- Political scientist Jim Flynn, discoverer of the Flynn effect in IQ, is based at the University of Otago.
- Forensic psychiatrist John Macdonald
- Email server Eudora Internet Mail Server (also Apple Internet Mail Server) was written by Glenn Anderson while he was a student at the University of Otago.
- Mathematician Alexander Aitken
- Chemist and lecturer Frederick Thomas Seelye.
- Anthropologist and director of Otago Museum H.D. Skinner
- Pioneers in New Zealand archaeology Atholl Anderson, Helen Leach, and Thomas Higham grew up in Dunedin. Other leading figures in the archaeology of Asia and the Pacific, Charles Higham, Foss Leach, Janet Davidson, Ian Smith, Glenn Summerhayes, Richard Walter, Lisa Matisoo-Smith and Hallie Buckley were based at the University of Otago.

== Sport ==
=== Cricket ===
- Australian test cricket international Clarrie Grimmett.
- New Zealand test cricket international and Black Caps coach Warren Lees.
- New Zealand test cricket captain Ken Rutherford.
- New Zealand test cricket captain Bert Sutcliffe MBE.
- New Zealand test cricket international and Black Caps coach Glenn Turner.
- Jeff Wilson (see under Rugby, below)
- New Zealand captain Brendon McCullum, raised in South Dunedin.
- New Zealand one day cricket international Nathan McCullum, brother to Brendon McCullum, raised in South Dunedin.
- Pakistani test cricket international and TVNZ cricket commentator, Billy Ibadulla.
- First-class cricketer John Cushen
- Grant Cederwall, played for Wellington from 1978/79–1990/91.
- Susie Bates, New Zealand cricketer and basketball Olympian.

=== Netball and basketball ===
- New Zealand netball international and Silver Fern coach Lois Muir.
- Tall Blacks basketball captain Glen Denham.

=== Rugby union ===
- All Black rugby union first-five Tony Brown.
- Double international All Blacks rugby union and Kiwis rugby league player Marc Ellis.
- Scotland rugby union international John Leslie.
- All Black rugby union half-back Byron Kelleher
- All Black rugby union full-back and coach Laurie Mains.
- All Black rugby union captain Anton Oliver.
- All Black rugby union captain Taine Randell.
- Double international All Blacks rugby union and Black Caps cricket player Jeff Wilson.
- Black Fern Kelly Brazier

=== Other sports ===
- Olympic champion long jumper Yvette Corlett (née Williams).
- Olympic Finn class yachting gold medalist and three times America's Cup-winning captain Russell Coutts (DCNZM, CBE).
- Anna Grimaldi, sprinter and long jumper, Paralympic gold medalist (2016).
- Greg Henderson, former world champion and Olympian in track and road cycling.
- Internationally recognised swimming coach Duncan Laing.
- Double Olympic champion swimmer Danyon Loader.
- World record-breaking middle-distance athlete Jack Lovelock.
- New Zealand hockey international (and award-winning poet) Brian Turner.
- New Zealand international golfer Greg Turner.
- New Zealand football internationals Andrew Boyens, Michael McGarry, Alex Stenhouse and Steve Wooddin
- World champion track cyclist Alison Shanks

== Military ==
- Sir Keith Park, World War I air ace, later Air Marshal in the defence of London during World War II.
- Duncan Boyes, English recipient of the Victoria Cross in 1864 in Japan, was buried in Dunedin in 1869.
- Horace Robert Martineau, English recipient of the Victoria Cross in 1899 in South Africa, was buried in Dunedin in 1916.
- Fraser Barron, standout bomber pilot during World War II

== Other ==
- Surveyor and explorer John Turnbull Thomson was a Dunedin resident.
- David Bain, subject of one of New Zealand's most famous legal causes célèbres was born in Dunedin.
- Rachel Armitage, community leader, welfare worker, and first female BA graduate at Oxford University.
- Presbyterian minister and social activist Rutherford Waddell spent his entire ministry in Dunedin.
- Mary Ronnie, City Librarian, first woman National Librarian and first woman National Librarian in the world.
- David Gray, the perpetrator of the 1990 Aramoana massacre in which 14 people were killed, was born in Dunedin and raised in Port Chalmers.
- Colin Bouwer, a South-African-born doctor and Head of Psychiatry at the University of Otago, spent 16 years in prison for the murder of his third wife three years after they became residents of Dunedin.
- Jean Stevenson, YWCA New Zealand General Secretary and women's advocate.
