= Archaeology of New Zealand =

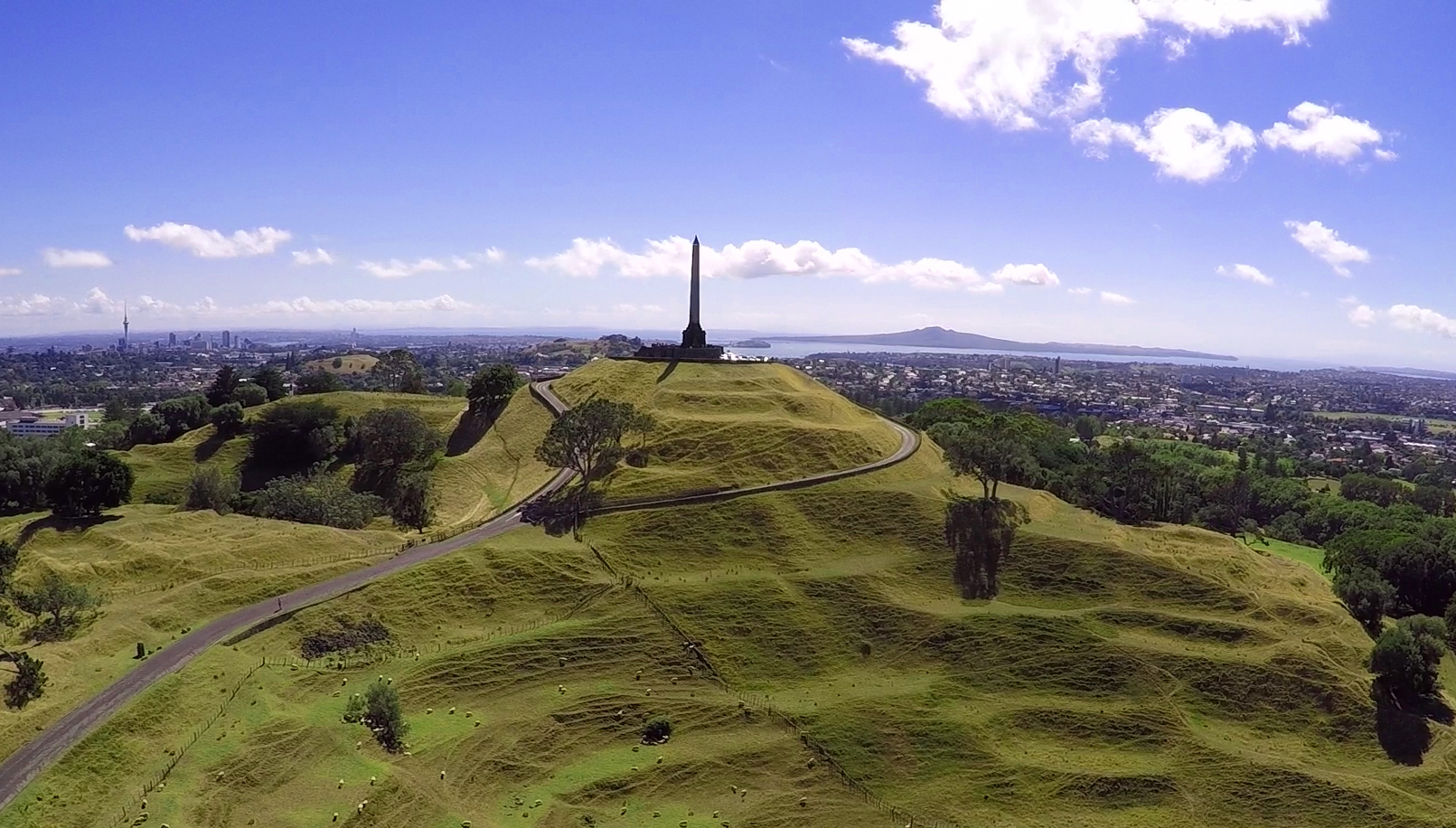
One Tree Hill pā (fortified village) site, Auckland

New Zealand archaeology started in the early 1800s, when it was largely conducted by amateurs with little regard for meticulous study. However, starting slowly in the 1870s, detailed research answered questions about human culture that have international relevance and wide public interest.

Archaeology has, along with oral traditions, defined New Zealand's prehistory (c. 1300 – c. 1642) and protohistory (c. 1642 – c. 1800) and has been a valuable aid in solving some later historical problems. Academically New Zealand's human prehistory is broadly divided into the periods of Archaic (~paleolithic then ~mesolithic after c. 1300 AD) and Classic (~neolithic) after c. 1500 AD, based on Māori culture. Eurasian labels do not fit perfectly, as some level of horticulture was always present in northern New Zealand, even existing at the same time as megafauna. More simply it can also be divided into time periods of pre and post European contact. Large poorly documented sections of New Zealand's more recent history have also been supplemented by archaeological research, such as at old battle sites or early urban centres.

== History of archaeology in New Zealand ==
Early archaeology in New Zealand was performed by anthropologists and private collectors of Māori artifacts. Many sites were destroyed by careless scavenging or poorly documented research. Systematic research was first conducted by the museums in the main cities, followed by anthropology departments in the universities of Auckland and Otago. In 1955 the New Zealand Archaeological Association was founded.

During this time in New Zealand the study of Māori oral tradition was more influential than archaeological techniques. The coming of the Māori "Great Fleet" to New Zealand was inferred to be in 1350 AD solely from traditional evidence (similar to modern estimates from carbon dating).

In the 21st century high resolution Landsat data was being used to interpret archaeological sites, although there was some doubt about the effectiveness of some modern tools. Archaeology departments conduct research from the university of Otago, Auckland and Canterbury. New Zealand archaeology is published in the Journal of Pacific Archaeology, the Journal of the Polynesian Society and other international journals.

== Historical archaeology ==
Historical archaeology in New Zealand has until recently largely been the archaeology of organised European and Chinese settlement after 1840. Cook's landing in 1769 has been used in the past to demarcate prehistoric and historic archaeology in New Zealand, but Māori have a strong record of their own history extending centuries before this date, and Māori oral tradition has been used to inform archaeological excavations—for example, settlement patterns in the western Bay of Plenty, or the site of Opita on the Hauraki Plains. At one point the study of post-contact Māori sites was referred to as the "ignored component" of New Zealand archaeology, but more recent studies are examining Māori and settler interaction, and the increasing incorporation of European culture into Māori society from 1769 well into the 19th century. There have been calls for New Zealand's archaeology to be seen as a continuum, stretching from the arrival of Māori to the arrival of Pākehā and continuing on through recent historical archaeology.

The New Zealand Historic Places Act defines an archaeological site as pre-1900, though this can be extended by application for particular sites such as the Clark brickworks. Consequently 20th century archaeology is uncommon, with a few exceptions—for example, Petchey's study of the Horahora Power Station (built 1910–1913).

As a discipline, historical archaeology in New Zealand started late and grew slowly; it was only by the 1960s that European structures were being systematically excavated. Although descriptions of fortification sites, both Māori and Pākehā, were published in the 1920s, the first historical excavations took place in the 1950s: the early historical Māori occupation of Orongo Bay near Young Nick's Head, Gisborne, and a 19th century British barracks at Paremata. Historical archaeology came of age, both in New Zealand and overseas, in the 1960s, with multiple studies of post-1769 Māori sites. After the New Zealand Archaeological Association changed its site recording scheme in 1966 to encompass historical excavations, more work began on non-Māori sites.

In 1975 the Historic Places Amendment Act was passed, which defined an archaeological site as one formed more that 100 years ago; this was redefined as a pre-1900 site in 1993 by the Historic Places Act. Before any such site could be damaged or modified permission was needed from the Historic Places Trust (renamed in 2014 Heritage New Zealand Pouhere Taonga). An influential early study was the 1970s excavation of the Taranaki fortifications Omata Stockade and Warea Redoubt by Nigel Prickett. Prickett went on to excavate other Pākehā and Māori sites from the 19th century New Zealand Wars like Queen's Redoubt, but also studied early shore whaling sites. Another significant historial archaeology research programme was the Clutha Valley Project, led by Neville Ritchie. This work on the early Otago gold fields examined changing mining practices and especially the lives of Chinese gold miners.

In the 1980s historical archaeological work expanded along with an increase in construction and the rise of commercial archaeology consultants. This mostly took the form of unpublished reports, while the proportion taking the form of published research in academic journals declined. The increase in reports accelerated after 2004, when the Historic Places Trust began applying the definition of the Historic Places Act to buildings, not just ruins, which meant any building constructed before 1900 became in effect an archaeological site. This led to the development of building archaeology in New Zealand, with dendrochronology used to refine construction dates, and studies examining how identity was reflected in buildings.

All reports produced by an archaeological authority began being made available in a digital library hosted by Heritage New Zealand. Two notable publications in New Zealand historical archaeology were the 2013 New Zealand Archaeological Association monograph Finding our Recent Past, and Ian Smith's 2019 book Pākehā Settlements in a Māori World. Since the retirement of Smith in 2017, there has been no historical archaeology research programme at either Otago University or the University of Auckland.

== List of notable archaeological sites ==
Exceptional archaeological sites are included in the national register (administered by Heritage New Zealand) in five groups: historic places (Category 1 and 2), historic areas, Wāhi Tūpuna (practical sites), Wāhi Tapu (spiritual sites) and Wahi Tapu areas. New Zealand has thousands of pre-contact sites, many of which are documented by the Historic Places Trust. Only a small fraction of these have detailed published archaeological reports. For example, in the South Island there are 550 rock art sites and 107 in the North Island and 6956 Pā in all New Zealand. The types of features present in New Zealand pre European archaeology are pā, storage pits, gardens (stone rows and banks), house floors, terraces, trenches, umu (earth ovens), middens, quarries, rock art and changes to the local flora.

Date	Period	Site name	Type	Region	Research	Photo	Grid reference
c. 1750	Classic	Huriawa Peninsula	Pā	Otago	Te Pā a Te Wera, reserve, and archaeological sites		45.640617°S 170.666309°E
		Kaingaroa rock art	Rock art	Taupo			38.45°S 176.71°E
	Both	Motutapu Island	Pā and settlement	Auckland	Transition from Archaic to Classic, with well dated ash layer from Rangitoto (left in image).		36.768654°S 176.707640°E
	Both	Opihi rock art	Rock art	South Canterbury	List number 9784 Historic Places Trust.		44.197327°S 171.019271°E
	Archaic	Papatowai	Settlement	Otago	Important early site for the study of Polynesian archaeology.		46.562°S 169.476°E
		Rangikapiti	Pā	Northland	Pre-European contact fortified village		34.984874°S 173.525565°E
1300s	Archaic	Shag River mouth	Settlement	Otago	Seasonality of fishing		45.481573°S 170.815767°E
	Classic	Te Kora	Pā	Taranaki	Large Pā complex, site of early work by Elsdon Best.		39.132972°S 173.988664°E
1288–1300	Archaic	Wairau Bar	Settlement	Marlborough	Most thoroughly studied Archaic settlement.		41.508458°S 174.064800°E
1440–1470		Chatham Islands	Waka	Chatham Islands	Parts of an ocean-going canoe (waka) - discovered in 2024		

== Debated questions in New Zealand's pre-contact archaeology ==
Many questions about pre-contact New Zealand have been answered by archaeology and for most it is unlikely that new information will radically change our understanding. However some questions are still debated in the recent academic press in the hope that a new argument or data may bring resolution.

=== Developing ideas and changing dates for the Māori arrival and settlement ===
First attempts to date the arrival of Māori in New Zealand, by 19th-century scholars such as S. Percy Smith, were based on genealogies and oral histories, many of which – when assigned an average generation length of 25 years – converged on a settlement date around 1350 AD, while others appeared to go back much further. This resulted in the classic theory, which all schoolchildren were once taught, that New Zealand had been discovered around 750 AD, then settled by later migrations, culminating in the "Great Fleet" of seven canoes around 1350 AD.

When radiocarbon dating started to be used in the 1950s, it appeared to support the idea of early settlement, though the "Great Fleet" itself fell out of favour when scholars showed that there were inconsistencies in the genealogies on which Smith had based his theory. This was replaced by the idea of gradual settlement over many centuries, but this in turn has proved to be mistaken. In 1989, for example, changes in the New Zealand biota, dated to about 1000 AD, were assumed to be linked to human settlement. However, by the mid-1990s, as radiocarbon dating methods were improved and sources of error better understood, it was realised that the early dates were not reliable and that the most reliable radiocarbon dates all pointed to a more recent first settlement, closer to 1300 AD or even later. In 1999, a sample from the Wairau Bar site gave a "late" age of 1230–1282 AD, which roughly coincided with charcoal and pollen evidence of forest fires that may or may not have been human-lit. The Wairau Bar settlement is known to be a first settler site because both its human remains and its artefacts came from tropical Polynesia.

Against this emerging evidence for late settlement was some seemingly contradictory evidence from the first radiocarbon dating of ancient rat bones in 1996, which gave unusually early dates – as early as 10 AD – and led its author to suggest that rats had been brought here by early human voyagers who did not stay. Some scholars saw the early rat bone dates as confirmation of their theory that humans had settled in New Zealand even earlier than the classic theory had suggested, living in small numbers for a thousand years or so without leaving artefacts or skeletal remains. However, further investigation found that those early rat bone results had been flawed, all coming from one laboratory during a limited time period, while all subsequent dating has found recent arrival times for both rats and humans. By 2008, there was little doubt that rats came to New Zealand with Māori no earlier than 1280 AD. This was confirmed in 2011 by a meta-analysis of dates from throughout the Pacific, which showed a sudden pulse of migration leading to all of New Zealand (including the Chatham Islands) being settled no earlier than c. 1290 AD.

While most researchers now use this late-13th-century date, others are revising it upward even further to around 1320 AD or later, based on new evidence from moa egg shells and from the Kaharoa eruption of Mount Tarawera (1314 ± 6 AD), whose tephra forms a geological layer below all well-dated human and rat sites. Some researchers now conclude that the weight of all the radiocarbon and DNA evidence points to New Zealand having been settled rapidly in a mass migration sometime after the Tarawera eruption, somewhere in the decades between 1320 and 1350 CE – which suggests that the "Great Fleet" theory, and the genealogical calculations on which it was based, were not totally inaccurate after all.

=== Population growth rates ===
The debate over Māori population size has two main areas of interest: how many settlers came to New Zealand and what was the population when European contact occurred. The second number is partly a historical question, and estimated populations have not strayed far from Captain Cook's first estimate of 100,000, with some researches going up to 150,000. This number, coupled with an inferred low growth rate, has led researchers to require either a large founding population (more than 300 people) or an early settlement date (600–850 AD). Therefore, a date of c. 1300 AD requires a mass migration from tropical Polynesia, even though mitochondrial DNA suggests there were about 70 (50–100) female settlers.

This story is further complicated by the South Island's slow growth rates throughout prehistory. This is because kumara was extremely difficult to grow in the South Island even during warm climatic periods. There is evidence that the "little ice age" affected New Zealand and caused a shrinking of the population. The extent of this cold period in New Zealand is unknown, but it may have peaked in the early 18th century. By 1886 diseases like measles, war and disruption led to a Māori population of about 40,000 and 2,000 in the North and South Islands respectively.

=== Cannibalism sites left alone - allegations of a conspiricy of silence ===
In 1999, human skeletal bones were discovered by an amateur palaeologist near a known archeological site in Brighton in Otago. The New Zealand Archaeological Association confirmed the site had been occupied by Maori for 400 years before the 18th century. It was reported that the runanga thought it best the site was "left alone". In 2008, there was a fresh call to investigate the site. A leading expert in the field said he had anecdotal evidence of sites elsewhere in New Zealand not being explored because they might contain evidence of cannibalism. A local Maori leader replied: "I haven't seen any conspiricy of silence about cannibalism." He said that Ngai Tahu supported local archaeology in learning from cannibal sites.

=== Transitions in Māori culture ===
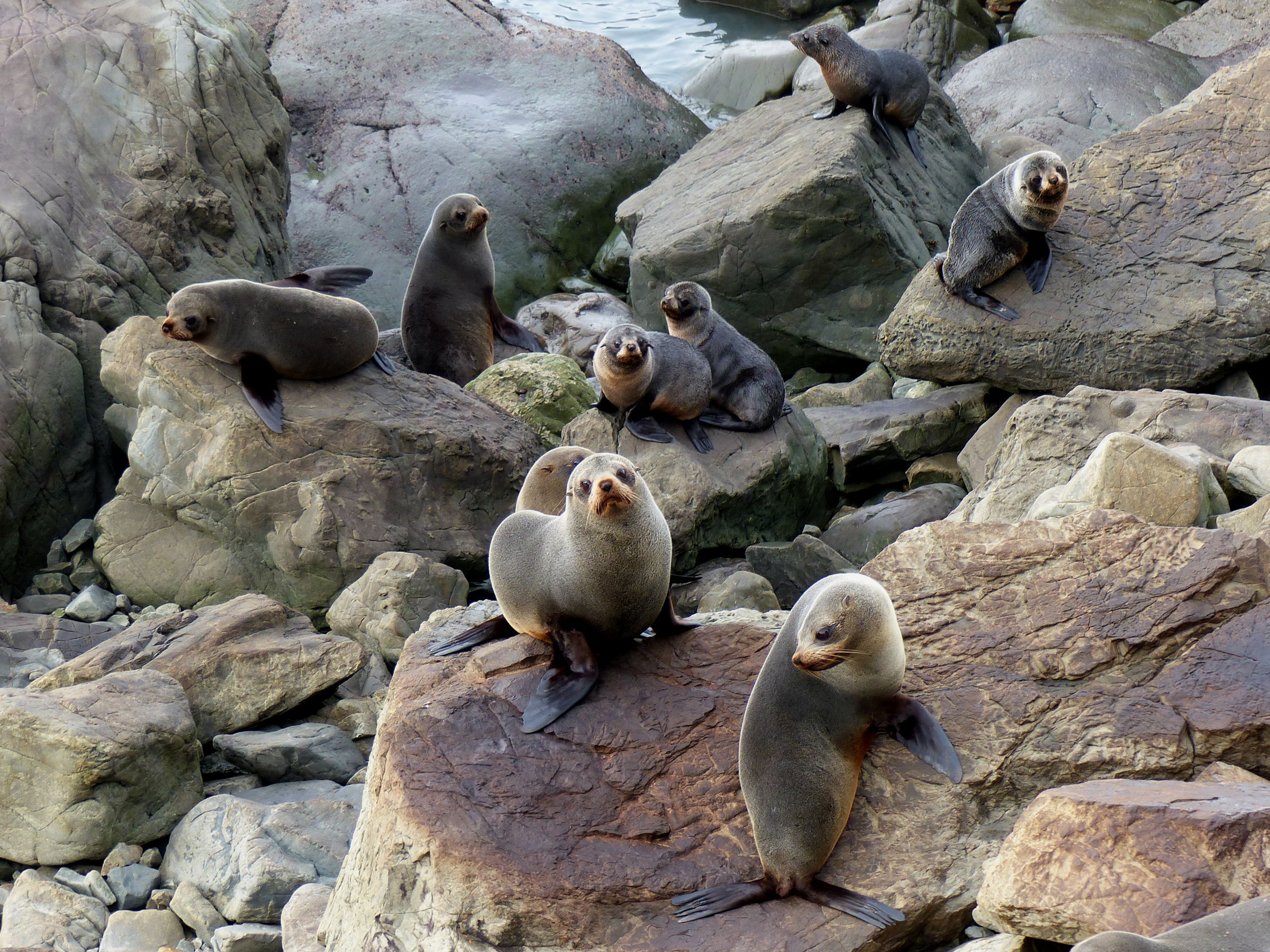
Archaic middens show that in many settlements seals were a more important food source than moa.

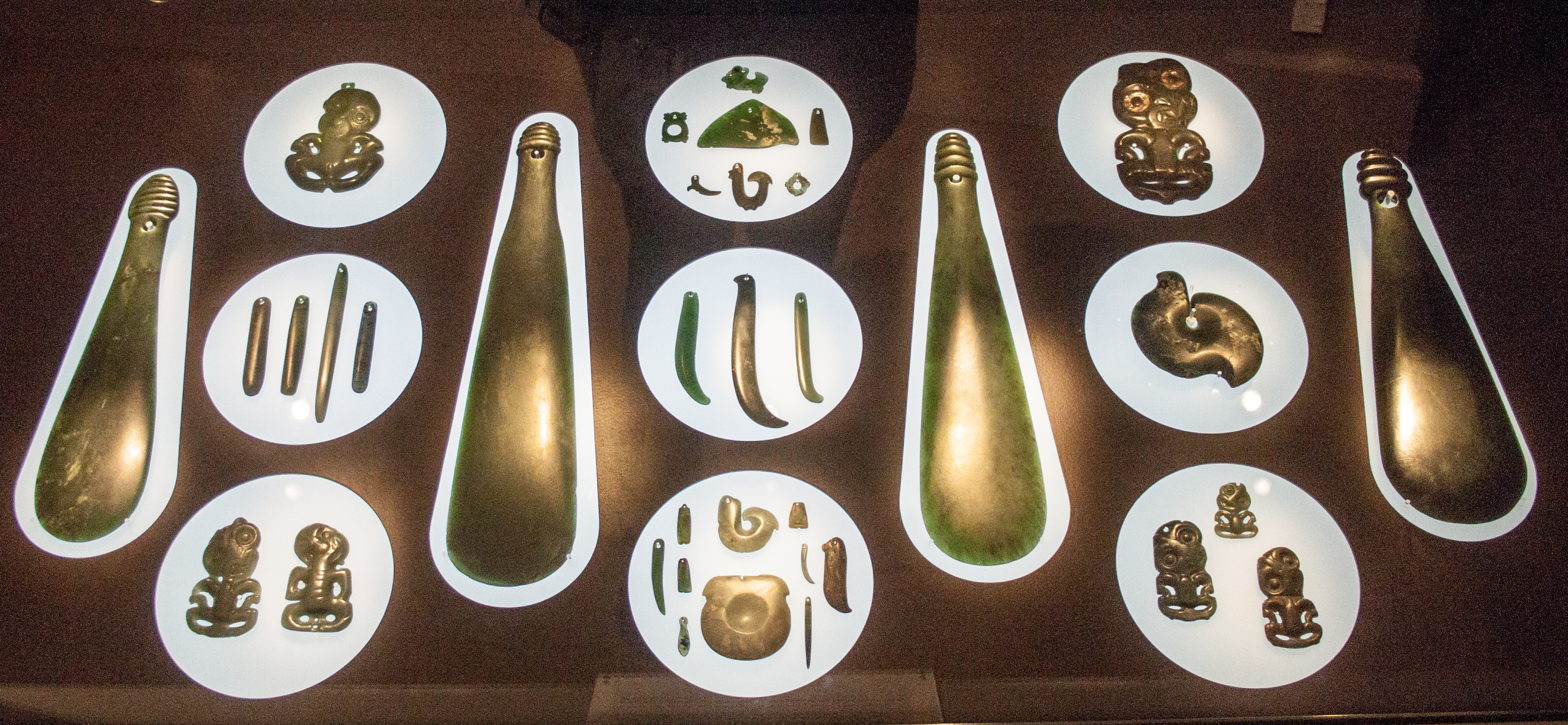
Pounamu objects require different working techniques to other rocks due to their hardness.

Māori culture has been in constant adaptation to New Zealand's changing environment. From the late 1950s onward the terms "Archaic" and "Classic" culture have been used to describe the early and late phases of pre-contact Māori, with "Archaic" replacing the older term "moa hunter" as the hunter-gatherer society lasted beyond the megafauna (as with Eurasia's Mesolithic).

The Archaic and Classic labels were intentionally chronological and not descriptive. They did not offer a definitive definition of either cultural period that could be used across time and space; particularly in locations like the southern South Island, where Classic tribes may migrate to regions where only an Archaic lifestyle was possible. Various transitional cultural artifacts and models have been proposed; however, there is still a dearth of evidence for a clear middle phase. Currently the Archaic culture is seen as semi nomadic hunter-gatherers with small gardens and populations, while the later Classic culture had large gardens and fortified permanent villages. Kumara cultivation was limited to the north until the Classic period, when building of storage pits and gardening methods allowed its storage over winter further south. In many sites in New Zealand the absence of a middle phase or the constraint of only two options has led to other interpretations, including a sevenfold evolution of boom and bust cycles. Growing kumara would have been just possible in the north of the South Island during some climatic conditions.

Topic	Archaic	Transition	Classic
Environment	Original landscape (some fire) throughout New Zealand	Fire and deforestation	Modified landscape mostly in North Island
Lifestyle	Hunter gatherers over large areas of New Zealand, but limited mass migration across country. Undefended settlements and little warfare, little slavery, burial near settlements.	Climatic and economic change	Localised living, with mass migration, Pā and warfare, slavery common, cannibalism?, hidden burial far from village.
Tools	Conservative continuance of older Polynesian culture	Adaptation to new environment	Pounamu (jade) carving
Houses	Seasonal (wharerau)	Over hunting and extinctions	Permanent (wharepuni)
Food	Big game hunting and small gardens	Commodification of production	Small game hunting and large gardens
Politics	Small groups (whānau to hapū)	Increasing social complexity	Large groups (hapū to iwi)

=== Communication and migration ===
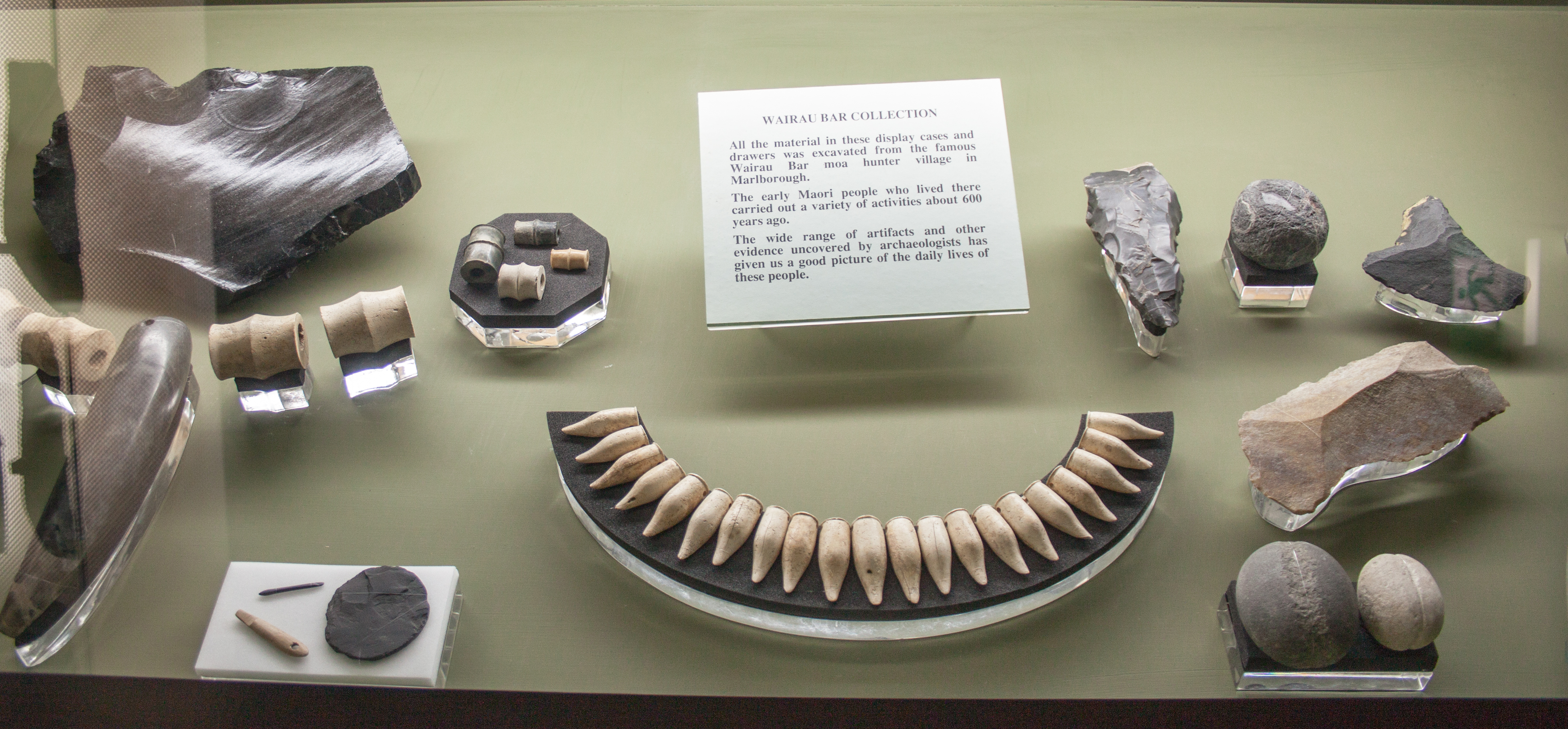
Archaic Māori objects from Wairau Bar. Note the obsidian (top left) from the Taupō Volcanic Zone.

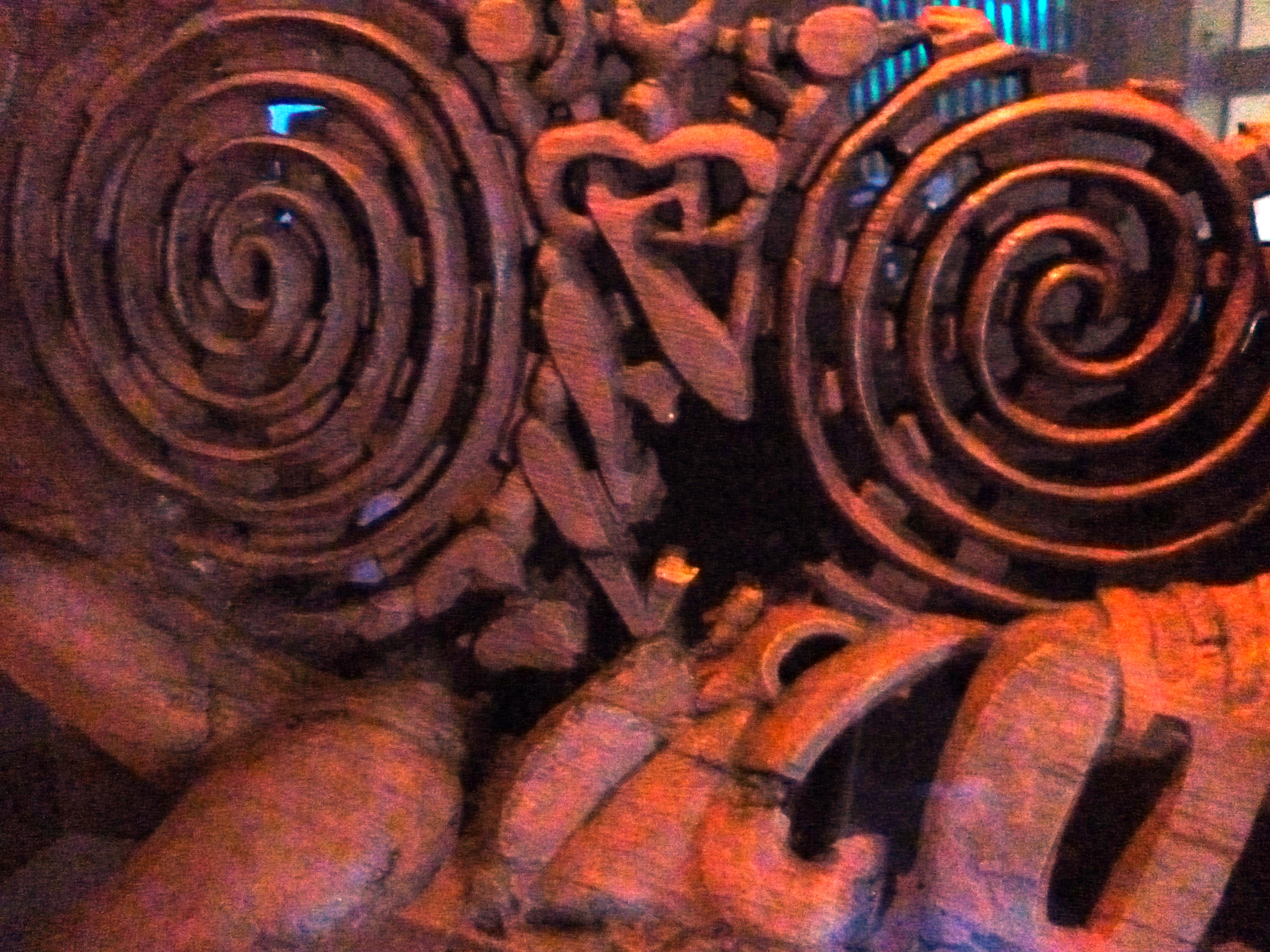
Waka (boat) recovered from the Taieri River plains

As the early settlers to New Zealand came in great numbers with supplies for planting numerous crop types it is believed that it was a planned migration to a known location. However while there is some speculation from non archaeological sources that migration to New Zealand continued throughout the Archaic period, evidence is absent in the archaeological record, and there is also no evidence for domestic pigs and chickens from the Pacific making it to New Zealand - something would have been expected if trade networks had been built.

The early Māori did, however, maintain the technology for long sea voyages – reaching the Chatham Islands about 1500 CE, where they developed into the separate Moriori people.

The earliest archaeological sites in New Zealand have implements from tropical Polynesia. There is also evidence that obsidian was traded throughout New Zealand from soon after arrival. However it was only in the sixteenth century that pounamu (jade) was traded around New Zealand, with a different supply network to the obsidian. Earthquakes caused changing living patterns and the movement of people.

The Māori language has changed little in the 700 years since it separated from Cook Islands Māori.

=== Resource management in a new environment ===
The ability of pre-contact Māori to manage resources and foresee ecological collapses has been the source of much debate. Natural fires were rare in New Zealand, yet much of the country was covered in dry forest, early Māori didn't protect fire-prone areas and there is no evidence of systematic burning of less fire-prone ones. Many New Zealand species may have been heading for slow extinction after Polynesian settlement. The extinction of the mega fauna (moa) seems to have occurred quickly, within 100 years. The first settlers came to New Zealand from tropical Polynesia and adapted to a temperate environment while preserving many of their old practices. Some conservative use of tropical Polynesian methods lasted well into the Archaic period.

== Notable New Zealand archaeologists ==
- Atholl Anderson
- Sue Bulmer
- Janet Davidson
- Roger Duff
- Jack Golson
- Roger Green
- Charles Higham
- Kevin Jones
- Helen Leach
- Foss Leach
- Bruce McFadgen
- Stuart Park
- Nigel Prickett
- Neville Ritchie
- Michael Trotter

== See also ==
- Australian archaeology
- Archaeology of Samoa
- History of New Zealand
- History of the Cook Islands
- Tahiti
