= Kevin Jones =

Kevin Jones may refer to:

- Kevin Jones (rugby league) (born 1964), British rugby league footballer of the 1980s and 1990s
- Kevin Jones (BMX rider) (born 1967), rider in the sport of Flatland BMX
- Kevin Jones (politician) (born 1974), member of the Kansas House of Representatives
- Kevin Jones (footballer) (born 1974), Welsh professional association footballer
- Kevin Jones (American football) (born 1982), American football running back
- Kevin Jones (cricketer) (born 1986), English cricketer
- Kevin Jones (basketball) (born 1989), American basketball player
- Kevin Jones (musician), American jazz percussionist and bandleader
- Kevin Jones (bowls) (born 1964), Canadian lawn bowler
- Kevin Jones (archaeologist) (1947–2023), New Zealand archaeologist

== See also ==
- Kevan Jones (born 1964), British Labour politician, Privy Councillor and trade union official
- Kevin Jonas (born 1987), American musician, actor, contractor and entrepreneur
