= Cederwall =

Cederwall is a surname. Notable people with the surname include:

- Bengt Cederwall (born 1929), Swedish curler
- Brian Cederwall (born 1952), New Zealand rugby union player
- Grant Cederwall (born 1959), New Zealand cricketer and rugby union player
- Peter Cederwall (born 1954), Swedish curler
