= Kelvin Jones =

Kelvin Jones may refer to:

- Kelvin Jones (soccer), American soccer player
- Kelvin Jones (singer), British–Zimbabwean singer-songwriter

== See also ==
- Kevin Jones (disambiguation)
