= Alexandra Redoubt =

Alexandra Redoubt may refer to the following in New Zealand:

- Alexandra Redoubt, Pirongia
- Alexandra Redoubt, Tuakau
