= Ian Smith (archaeologist) =

New Zealand archaeologist (1954–2020)

- Born: 21 September 1954
- Died: 3 January 2020 (aged 65); Dunedin, New Zealand
- Education: University of Otago
- Scientific career
- Fields: Historical archaeology
- Workplaces: University of Otago
- Thesis: Sea mammal hunting and prehistoric subsistence in New Zealand (1985)

Ian Woodford Gibson Smith (21 September 1954 – 3 January 2020) was a New Zealand archaeologist who specialised in researching the exploitation of marine mammals in prehistory and historical archaeology. His particular interest was in the intersection of Māori and Pākehā cultures in the early European contact period

== Early life and education ==
Born in 1954, Smith was one of five children of Robin Smith and Shirley Smith. Most of his early life was spent in Ranfurly, where he attended Maniototo Area School before moving to Hamilton. There he attended Hillcrest Normal School, Hamilton Boys' High School and Melville High School. He studied archaeology at the University of Otago, gaining a Bachelor of Arts in 1976 with his thesis on the exploitation of fur seals in the Chatham Islands and a PhD in 1985 with a thesis on sea mammal hunting and subsistence.

== Career ==
From 1982 to 1987 Smith was a lecturer at the University of Auckland, followed by two years as an archaeologist with the Department of Conservation. In 1989 he joined the University of Otago as a lecturer, later becoming an associate professor.

Smith's research on prehistoric marine mammal exploitation and the analysis of faunal remains in archaeological sites generated a significant number of publications. For his PhD thesis he analysed faunal remains from 53 sites; fauna included mammals, birds, fish and shellfish, and he demonstrated the importance of fur seals in Māori diet. His analyses "worked out changes in Māori hunting strategies, seasonality and diet from the thirteenth to eighteenth centuries." His expertise in marine animals and faunal analysis led to his participation, with Atholl Anderson and others, in excavations on sites at Waitaki River mouth, Hawksburn, Papatowai, Shag River mouth and Pleasant River, as well as sites on Norfolk Island, in French Polynesia and others in the Pacific.

Smith's approach to studying the economic systems of pre-European settlements convinced him that evidence from archaeology and history could contribute to solutions for current ecological problems. He contributed to government reports on the management and use of marine resources.

While he continued to study the human impact on marine life throughout his career, Smith's research interests expanded to historical archaeology. During the 1990s he investigated sites of early shore whaling stations, excavating at Te Hoe on the Māhia Peninsula and the Oashore Whaling Station on Banks Peninsula with Nigel Prickett, as well as excavating early European settlement sites in Dusky Sound in Fiordland. In 2007, he collaborated with Atholl Anderson and Angela Middleton on a project to investigate the pre-European settlement and historic occupation by sealers of Codfish Island / Whenua Hou; Smith directed the excavation of a house at Sealers Bay.

Smith and Middleton conducted major investigations at Hohi Mission Station in the Bay of Islands, the site of the earliest Christian mission. They excavated school buildings, houses and other buildings from 2012 to 2013. The Mission Station is part of the Rangihoua Heritage Park, and Smith developed the heritage trail and material for the park. Smith and Middleton's work is one of the few investigations that cast light on Māori-Pākehā cross-cultural relations in the mission setting.

In 1999 and 2004, Smith published two reviews of the study and practice of historical archaeology in New Zealand. His 1999 review outlined the development of historical archaeology in New Zealand, which dated back to the 1920s but flourished in the 1960s and 1980s. He noted that most work done in the field was by archaeologists trained in investigating Māori pre-European sites but with little application of historical data. By 2004 Smith argued that archaeologists "were not contributing enough to Aotearoa New Zealand's historical narrative or to the general understanding of the social and cultural processes, and that we needed to do better."

Smith's work on the interaction of Māori and European cultures in the 18th and 19th centuries culminated in the 2020 publication of his work Pākehā Settlements in a Māori World: New Zealand Archaeology 1769–1860. In it he divided the period into five phases: "ship-based exploration(1769-1791); sojourning (1792-1813), in which Pākehā were first left on shore to fend for themselves; the beginnings of permanent residency, though confined to the far north and far south and to single function settlements (1814-1828); dispersal around the entire coast and diversification across trades (1828-1840); and colonial governance and settlement (1840-1860)". Analysis of the material objects found in archaeological investigations enhanced by written, oral and pictorial sources enabled a fuller picture of settlement activities in the contact period.

Smith's contribution to the development of historical archaeology in New Zealand and the inspiration he gave to his students is acknowledged as his greatest legacy. He supervised graduate students, taught courses in historical archaeology and trained students in the field as well as in analysis and identification of fauna and artifacts. He was also on the editorial board of the journal Australian Historical Archaeology.

== Personal life ==
Smith married Judith Laube in 1980, and they had three children. His second wife was archaeologist Angela Middleton (1953 – 2019).

Smith retired in 2019 and died in Dunedin on 3 January 2020.

== Legacy ==
The New Zealand Archaeological Association's Ian Smith Memorial Lecture was presented by Atholl Anderson in 2025.

== Selected publications ==
A full list of Smith's publications is published in his obituary by James Flexner.

- Smith, I. W. G. (1977). Prehistoric fur seal exploitation on the southwest coast of Chatham Island. Working papers in Chatham Islands archaeology. Vol. 7. University of Otago.
- Smith, I.W.G. (1991). "The Development of Historical Archaeology in New Zealand 1921 - 1990". Australian Journal of Historical Archaeology. 9: 6–13. JSTOR 29543281.
- Anderson, A.; Allingham, B.; Smith, I.W.G. (1996). Shag River mouth : the archaeology of an early southern Maori village. Research papers in archaeology and natural history no. 27. Canberra: ANH Publications, RSPAS, The Australian National University.
- Taylor, Rowan; Smith, I.W.G., eds. (1997). The state of New Zealand's environment, 1997. Wellington: Ministry for the Environment : GP Publications. ISBN 978-0-478-09000-0.
- Smith, I. W. G. (2002). The New Zealand sealing industry: history, archaeology, and heritage management. Department of Conservation. ISBN 0478222505.
- Smith, I. (2004). "Archaeologies of Identity: Historical Archaeology for the 21st Century". In Furey, Louise (ed.). Change through time: 50 years of New Zealand Archaeology. New Zealand Archaeological Association monograph 26. Auckland: New Zealand Archaeological Association. ISBN 978-0-9597915-9-4.
- Smith, I.W.G. (2011). Estimating the magnitude of pre-European Māori marine harvest in two New Zealand study areas. New Zealand Aquatic Environment and Biodiversity Report No. 82. Ministry of Fisheries. OCLC 767737288 – via NDHA.
- Smith, Ian; Middleton, Angela; Garland, Jessie; Woods, Naomi (2012). Archaeology of the Hohi Mission Station. Volume 1. The 2012 excavations. University of Otago studies in archaeology no. 24. Dunedin: Department of Anthropology and Archaeology, University of Otago. OCLC 842385759.
- Smith, I.W.G.; Middleton, A.; Garland, J.; Russell, T. (2014). Archaeology of the Hohi Mission Station. Volume II. The 2013 excavations. University of Otago studies in archaeology no. 26. Dunedin: Department of Anthropology and Archaeology, University of Otago. OCLC 906029113 – via NDHA.
- Smith, Ian (2020). Pākehā Settlements in a Māori World: New Zealand Archaeology 1769–1860. Bridget Williams Books. doi:10.7810/9780947492489. ISBN 978-0-947492-48-9.
