= Opihi, New Zealand =

Place in New Zealand

Coordinates: 44.209°S 171.063°E

Opihi is a small rural district located in the Timaru District, New Zealand. It is located just north of Pleasant Point and just to the west of Temuka. Richard Pearse lived in the area and conducted his 1903 experiments in powered flight along the banks of the Ōpihi River.

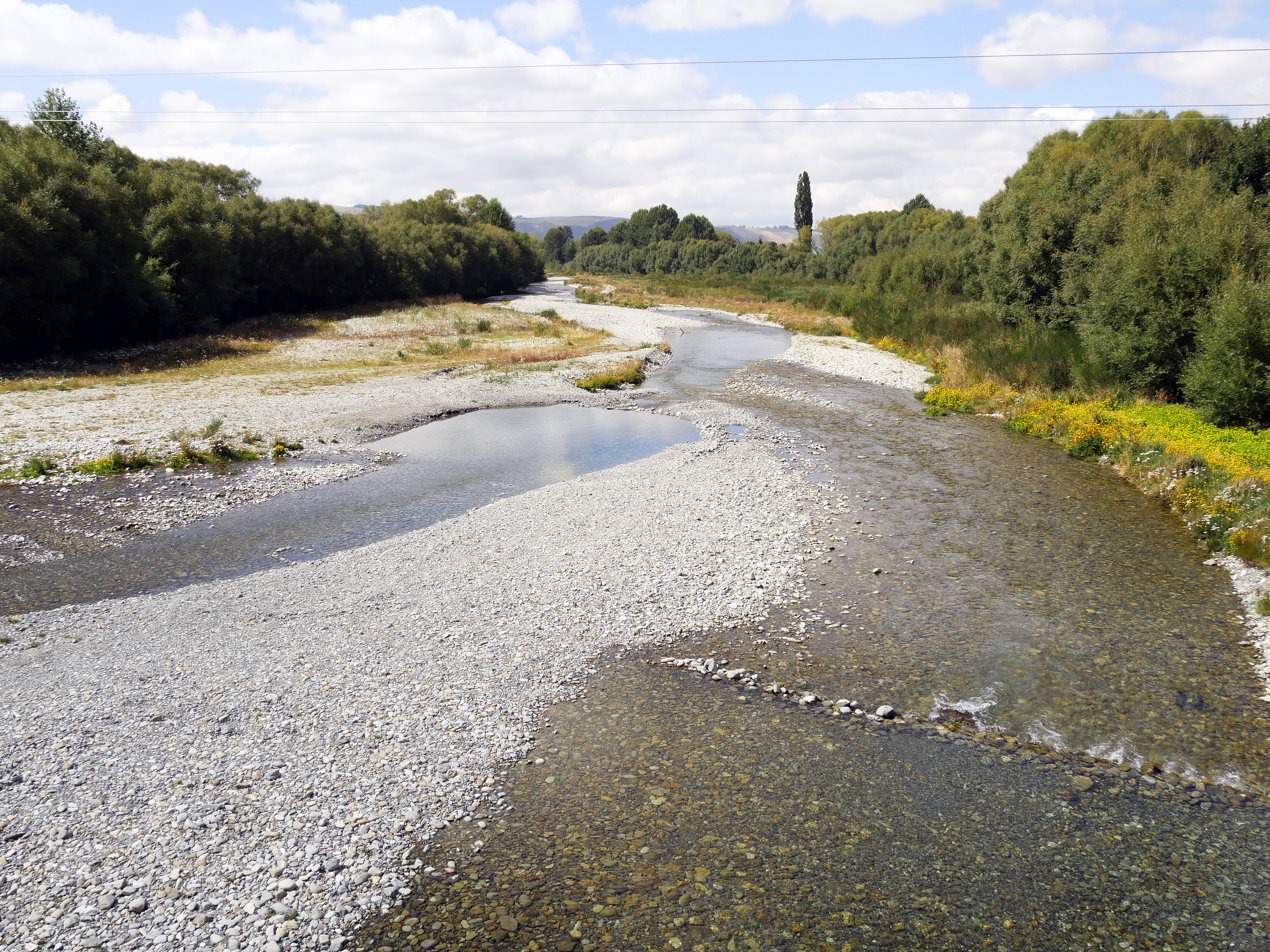
Ōpihi River

Opihi is the site of 14 limestone caves and overhangs that contains pre-historic Māori rock art significant to New Zealand archaeology. The site around the Ōpihi River has a cluster of 18 rock art sites.
