= Nigel Prickett =

New Zealand archaeologist (born 1943)

- Born: 1943 (age 82–83); New Zealand

Academic background
- Education: Victoria University of Wellington (BA); University of Otago (MA)
- Alma mater: University of Auckland
- Thesis: The Archaeology of a Military Frontier: Taranaki, New Zealand, 1860-1881 (1981)

Academic work
- Discipline: Archaeology
- Sub-discipline: Historical archeology
- Institutions: Auckland War Memorial Museum
- Main interests: New Zealand Wars
- Notable works: Landscapes of Conflict (2002)

Nigel Prickett (born 1943) is a New Zealand archaeologist, with a particular interest in the field of historical archaeology. He has written works relating to fortifications of the New Zealand Wars, including the 2002 book 'Landscapes of Conflict'.

== Biography ==
Born in 1943, Nigel Prickett studied history at Victoria University of Wellington for his Bachelor of Arts and was then engaged on Foss Leach's Wairarapa Research Programme, which ran from 1969 to 1972. He then commenced his Master of Arts degree at the University of Otago. His thesis on prehistoric housing was stimulated by the discovery of a prehistoric building on his brother's Wairarapa farm.

Prickett was director of the Taranaki Museum in New Plymouth after completing his MA, and then commenced doctorate studies at the University of Auckland. His Doctor of Philosophy was completed in 1981 and his thesis was entitled 'The Archaeology of a Military Frontier: Taranaki, New Zealand, 1860-1881'. He subsequently wrote monographs of his archaeological work at the sites of former fortifications of the British Army in the Taranaki.

During his PhD studies, Prickett commenced employment at the Auckland War Memorial Museum as its Curator of Archaeology. He was later its Manager of Human History. He was involved in coordinating the museum's 'Scars on the Heart' exhibition, relating to New Zealand's military history, and the display 'Volcanoes and Giants', concerning the region's volcanic history. From 1991 to 2008, Prickett and the ornithologist Brian Gill were co-editors of 'Papahou: Records of the Auckland Museum', the journal published by the Auckland War Memorial Museum. Prickett retired from the museum in November 2008. He was made a fellow of the Auckland War Memorial Museum in 2012 and received its Museum Medal.

In 2002, Prickett published the well received 'Landscapes of Conflict', a study of the sites of fortifications of the New Zealand Wars. This was the subject of litigation when it was found the historian Danny Keenan had plagiarised portions of it for his own work, 'Wars Without End'. The dispute resulted in Keenan's book being recalled by the publishers, Penguin New Zealand, revised and republished without the offending material.

During the course of his career, Prickett was involved in the New Zealand Archaeological Association (NZAA), editing its newsletter from 1979 through to 1987. He also published a chapter on historical archaeology in the NZAA's 1979 Field Handbook and represented the NZAA on the Archaeology Committee of the New Zealand Historic Places Trust (the predecessor of Heritage New Zealand). He later wrote a short history of the organisation to celebrate its 50th anniversary. He was made an honorary member in 2002, and then in 2018, received the NZAA's lifetime achievement award.

== Select publications ==
- Prickett, N., Prickett, K. E. (1976). Report on the D’Urville Island archaeological site survey 1976. [NZHPT].
- 'Excavations at the Omata Stockade, N108/39, January-February 1977 : a preliminary report.' Newsletter (New Zealand Archaeological Association), Mar 1978; v.21 n.1, p. 2–12
- 'Excavations at Warea Redoubt, N118/6, January-February 1978 : a preliminary report.' Newsletter (New Zealand Archaeological Association), Sep 1978; v.21 n.3, p. 85–92
- Historic Taranaki : an archaeological guide. (1990). GP Books.
- Archaeological excavations at the Omata Stockade and Warea Redoubt, Taranaki. (1994). New Zealand Archaeological Association.
- Ngā tohu tawhito = Early Māori ornaments. (1999). David Bateman in association with Auckland Museum.
- Māori origins : from Asia to Aotearoa. (2001). David Bateman in association with Auckland Museum.
- Landscapes of Conflict: A Field Guide to the New Zealand Wars (2002). Auckland: Random House
- Fortifications of the New Zealand Wars (2016). Wellington: Department of Conservation
