= Nancy Tichborne =

New Zealand watercolor artist (1942–2023)

- Born: Nancy Margaret Keedwell; 27 August 1942; Levin, New Zealand
- Died: 10 February 2023 (aged 80); Akaroa, New Zealand
- Spouse: Bryan Tichborne (m. 1965)
- Children: 3
- Relatives: Helen Leach (sister)

Nancy Margaret Tichborne (née Keedwell; 27 August 1942 – 10 February 2023) was a New Zealand watercolour artist. She specialised in paintings of flowers; her work has appeared on calendars, diaries, cards and postage stamps in New Zealand and internationally.

== Biography ==
Tichborne was born in Levin on 27 August 1942 to Peggy (née Watkins) and Harvey Keedwell, and grew up in Hāwera, in the North Island of New Zealand. She was the second of three daughters; her sisters were Mary Browne, a cookbook writer, and the food anthropologist Helen Leach. In 1952, the family moved to Dunedin and Tichborne attended Otago Girls' High School. On leaving high school, she went to London on a scholarship and studied art at St Martin's School of Art from 1960 to 1962. In 1964, she returned to Dunedin for a short time and her work was included in an exhibition there. She then went on to work in Hong Kong as a fashion illustrator for the South China Morning Post and a fashion designer for an American fashion house between 1964 and 1965, before spending the next five years in England and Wales.

In 1970, Tichborne returned to New Zealand and settled in Rotorua. She worked part-time as an art teacher and collaborated with her sisters Helen Leach and Mary Browne on a series of cookbooks, providing the watercolour artwork for them. In 1984, Tichborne and her husband Bryan founded the New Zealand Calendar Company, and started producing calendars with a New Zealand focus. Their first calendar featured fishing flies, and later titles featured flowers and cats. Their 39th and last calendar was produced in 2010.

In 1997, Tichborne designed a series of postage stamps and a first day cover for New Zealand Post depicting vineyards of New Zealand. Her artwork was also used on stamps of Bhutan and the Pitcairn Islands. In the 1990s, Tichborne released a series of DVDs on watercolour technique.

=== Recognition ===
In 2007, Tichborne was appointed patron of Watercolour New Zealand. She remained in that position for 12 years.

=== Personal life and death ===
In 1963, Tichborne met Bryan Tichborne—at that time a soldier undertaking officer training at Sandhurst—in Killarney, Ireland, and the couple married in Hong Kong in 1965. They had three sons. In 1994, the couple moved to a property at French Farm, near Akaroa in Canterbury. Tichborne established a garden there that in 2011 was designated a Garden of Significance by the New Zealand Gardens Trust. The couple subsequently moved to a smaller property in Akaroa.

Tichborne died at her home in Akaroa on 10 February 2023, at the age of 80.

== Publications ==
- Browne, M., Tichborne, N., & Leach, H. M. (1980). The cook's garden: For cooks who garden and gardeners who cook. Wellington: Reed.
- Browne, M., Leach, H. H. M., & Tichborne, N. (1981). The New Zealand bread book. Reed:
- Burton, D., Tichborne, N., & Ashton, J. (1983). Two hundred years of New Zealand food and cookery. Wellington: Reed.
- Browne, M., Leach, H. M., & Tichborne, N. (1983). The Australian bread book. Sydney: Doubleday Australia.
- Leach, H. M., & Tichborne, N. (1984). 1,000 years of gardening in New Zealand. Wellington N.Z.: Reed.
- Burton, D., & Tichborne, N. (1987). New Zealand food & cookery. Auckland, N.Z.: Mural Books.
- Burton, D., & Tichborne, N. (1987). David Burton's New Zealand food and cookery. Auckland, N.Z: David Bateman.
- Browne, M., Leach, H., & Tichborne, N. (1987). More from the cook's garden. Auckland: Reed Methuen.
- Browne, M., Leach, H. M., & Tichborne, N. (1989). The cook's bread book. Auckland N.Z.: Heinemann Reed.
- Tichborne, N., & Tichborne, B. (1990). Anglers' paradise: Favourite fishing waters of New Zealand and the flies to fish them with. Auckland, N.Z: Bush Press.
- Browne, M., Leach, H. H. M., & Tichborne, N. (1996). The New Zealand bread book. Godwit: Auckland, N.Z.
- Tichborne, N. (1999). Nancy Tichborne's flowers. Auckland, N.Z: Godwit.
- Browne, M., Tichborne, N., & Leach, H. M. (2000). The cook's salad garden. Milsons Point, N.S.W: Random House Australia.
- Tichborne, N. (2000). Nancy Tichborne's cats. Auckland: Godwit.
- Browne, M., Leach, H. M., & Tichborne, N. (2001). The cook's herb garden. Auckland, N.Z: Godwit.
- Tichborne, N. (2008). Nancy Tichborne's watercolour world: The creative process explored. Akaroa, N.Z: New Zealand Calendar Company Ltd.
