= Neville Ritchie =

New Zealand archeologist (born 1950)

- Born: 1950 (age 75–76); New Zealand

Academic background
- Education: University of Otago
- Thesis: Archaeology and history of the Chinese in southern New Zealand during the nineteenth century: a study of acculturation, adaptation, and change (1986)
- Doctoral advisor: Atholl Anderson; Donn Bayard

Academic work
- Discipline: Archaeology
- Sub-discipline: Historical archeology
- Institutions: New Zealand Historic Places Trust; Department of Conservation
- Main interests: History of gold mining in New Zealand; New Zealand Wars

Neville Ritchie (born 1950) is a New Zealand archaeologist, with a particular interest in the field of historical archaeology. He has written works relating to relics of gold mining in New Zealand's Coromandel Peninsula, fortifications of the New Zealand Wars, and Chinese gold miners in Otago.

== Biography ==
Born in 1950, Neville Ritchie completed a Master of Arts degree at the University of Otago, with a thesis covering the use of Pounamu (greenstone) in the region. He was subsequently employed by the Southland Museum and then the New Zealand Historic Places Trust, the predecessor to Heritage New Zealand.

In 1977 Ritchie was appointed the project archaeologist for the Clutha Valley Development, assessing historical sites in the region prior to flooding as a result of damming the Clutha River. Over a ten-year period, he supervised around 150 students on their work in the region and identified some 2,000 archeological sites. Not all of these were in the area to be flooded; the survey extended as far as the Dart Bridge, to the west, and north to Lake Ruataniwha. As well as sites relating to the gold mining era, sites relating to pre-European Māori and fossil deposits were found. It was the largest archaeology project of its kind in New Zealand. Ritchie also discovered the grave of a gold miner; the remains were collected and stored at the University of Otago before being eventually re-interred at the Cromwell Cemetery in 2022.

As part of his work, Ritchie developed an interest in the Chinese miners who had worked on the gold fields of Otago. According to an interview given by Ritchie, around 60% of the sites that would be destroyed or flooded as a result of the damming project had connections to the Chinese migrants who had worked the fields in the area. Under the supervision of Atholl Anderson and Donn Bayard, he commenced a Doctor of Philosophy degree at the University of Otago. His PhD thesis, entitled 'Archaeology and history of the Chinese in southern New Zealand during the nineteenth century: a study of acculturation, adaptation, and change', was completed in 1986.

Ritchie took up a position with the Department of Conservation (DOC) in 1986 as its archaeologist in the Waikato region. He was tasked with the protection and care of archaeological sites on land administered by DOC. This included Alexandra Redoubt, which underwent a restoration, and various gold mining facilities in the Coromandel Peninsula. He also worked on projects of the Antarctic Heritage Trust, including excavations of the huts at the Ross Dependency used by Robert Falcon Scott and Ernest Shackleton on their respective expeditions to the South Pole. He retired from DOC in 2018.

Ritchie remained active in archaeology, working on the preservation of Queen's Redoubt at Pōkeno and co-authoring a history of the site. His PhD thesis on Chinese miners in Otago was published in 2023 by Sydney University Press.

== Select publications ==
- Coromandel Gold: A Guide to the Historic Goldfields of Coromandel Peninsula – coauthor alongside Phil Moore (1996)
- The Waikato War of 1863–64: A Guide to the Main Events and Sites (2001)
- A History of Queen's Redoubt & the Invasion of the Waikato – coauthor alongside Ian Barton (2021)
- Archaeology and History of the Chinese in Southern New Zealand During the Nineteenth Century (2023)
