= Kevin Jones (archaeologist) =

New Zealand archaeologist (1947–2023)

Kevin Lewis Jones (September 1947 – 31 January 2023) was a New Zealand archaeologist who pioneered aerial photography of archaeological and heritage sites and was influential internationally in the protection of heritage sites.

== Early life and education ==
Jones was born in September 1947 in Dunedin where he grew up. He studied engineering, philosophy, library studies and anthropology and in 1972 joined an archaeological excavation in Thailand under Chet Gorman. His M.A. thesis, which was supervised by Foss Leach at the University of Otago, was entitled Prehistoric Polynesian Stone Technology: A study of usage and flaking technique with special reference to assemblages of stone flake debitage of New Zealand archaic cultural provenance.

== Career ==
Jones began his career working on databases at the DSIR before joining the archaeology unit of the New Zealand Historic Places Trust (now Heritage New Zealand) in 1978. The unit was transferred to the Department of Conservation in 1987 and Jones continued to work there until he left in 2008 to establish his own archaeological consultancy.

Jones' major work during his time with Heritage New Zealand was surveying in the eastern Bay of Plenty, Hawke's Bay and the East Coast of the North Island with a particular emphasis on areas of forestry. This resulted in the establishment of standards for the management of archaeological sites in forestry and stimulated his approach of viewing archaeological sites as part of and in relation to the wider physical landscape. During work surveying on the East Coast Jones discovered a George III coronation medalet from 1761 which had most likely been gifted to a Māori leader (rangatira) by James Cook in 1769. It is significant as the only archaeological find from Cook's first visit to New Zealand and is in the collection of the Tairawhiti Museum.

During his time in the Department of Conservation Jones worked all over New Zealand but continued his work on the East Coast and in forestry. In 2003 he was in a survey team recording sites in the Auckland Islands; the results were published in 2009.

In 1991 Jones completed a Master in Public Policy at Victoria University of Wellington with a thesis on the statutory use of policy statements. Jones received a Winston Churchill Memorial Fellowship in 1993 which enabled him to travel in the United States to study site stabilisation and reconstruction and later produce a report on the topic.

Jones made a significant contribution to the practice of aerial photography of archaeological and heritage sites. From 1996 onwards he attended meetings of the Aerial Archaeology Research Group in the UK where he presented his work on sites and landscapes in New Zealand. He also wrote review articles for the AARGnews.

Internationally Jones contributed as a cultural adviser assessing and designating several world heritage sites: the Blue Mountains in New South Wales in 1999, Purnululu National Park in Western Australia in 2002 Taputapuātea on Ra'iātea Island in French Polynesia in 2016 and the Tasmanian Wilderness World Heritage Area. His 2005 paper on Pacific World Heritage was written to assist Pacific Island nations to develop their own heritage lists taking Pacific cultural themes into account. In 2007 he contributed to a UNESCO study which influenced a change in the organisation to viewing sites as cultural landscapes.

As a consultant from 2008 to 2020 Jones advised on the archaeological significance of sites affected by development projects as well as monitoring during development works, mostly in the Wellington region. In this role he also advised the Department of Conservation on the significance of sites either regionally or thematically e.g. New Zealand Wars sites, early sites and the management of wetlands.

In 2021 the New Zealand Archaeological Association awarded Jones a Roger C Green Lifetime Achievement Award for his long contribution to and influence on archaeological practice and heritage protection.

Jones died on 31 January 2023 in Wellington and is buried in the Frankton Cemetery in Queenstown.

== Selected publications ==
- Jones, Kevin L. (1982). Cutters Bay (S22/40) : a whaling station in Port Underwood, Marlborough Sounds. Newsletter (New Zealand Archaeological Association), Dec 1982; v.25 n.4, 252–257.
- Jones, K. L. (1983). Pa in two western segments of the Waitahi and Whakatane Valleys, Bay of Plenty. In Newsletter (New Zealand Archaeological Association): Vol. Sep 1983; v.26 n.3 (pp. 165–173).
- Jones, K. L. (1984). Polynesian quarrying and flaking practices at the Samson Bay and Falls Creek argillite quarries, Tasman Bay, New Zealand. World Archaeology, 16, 248–266. https://doi.org/10.1080/00438243.1984.9979931
- Jones, K. L. (1984). Lithic Waste Flakes as a Measure of Cultural Affinity: A New Zealand Case Study. Lithic Technology, 13(3), 71–83. http://www.jstor.org/stable/41999799
- Jones, K. L. (1984). Dune soils and Polynesian gardening near Hokianga North Head, North Island, New Zealand. World Archaeology, 16, 75–88. https://doi.org/10.1080/00438243.1984.9979917
- Jones, K. L. (1986). A guide to Wellington’s Maori history : nga korero mua o te upoko o te ika. Wellington Regional Committee of the New Zealand Historic Places Trust.
- Jones, K. L. (1989). In much greater affluence: productivity and welfare in Maori gardening at Anaura Bay, October 1769. The Journal of the Polynesian Society, 98(1), 49–75. http://www.jstor.org/stable/20706251
- Jones, K. L. (1994). Ngā tohuwhenua mai te rangi : a New Zealand archaeology in aerial photographs. Victoria University Press.
- Jones, Kevin L. (1994). Archaeological site stabilisation and reconstruction in the United States: Winston Churchill Memorial Fellowship Report 1993. Wellington: Department of Conservation. ISBN 0478015984.
- Jones, K. L. (1996). Aerial Photography in New Zealand Archaeology. Australasian Historical Archaeology, 14, 25–33. http://www.jstor.org/stable/29544384
- Jones, K.L. (1996). The development of aerial photography in New Zealand Archaeology. AARGnews, 13, 7–13.
- Jones, K.L. (1997). The development of aerial photography in New Zealand Archaeology (part II). AARGnews, 14, 13–22.
- Jones, K. L. (1998). The state of large earthwork sites in the United Kingdom. Antiquity, 72(276), 293–307.
- Jones, K. L. (2002). Aerial archaeology of the southern Hawke’s Bay coast, New Zealand. Antiquity, 76(291), 43–44.
- Jones, Kevin L. (2007). Caring for archaeological sites: practical guidelines for protecting and managing archaeological sites in New Zealand (PDF). Wellington: Department of Conservation. ISBN 9780478142600.
- Smith, A; Jones, K.L. (2007). Cultural landscapes of the Pacific Islands : ICOMOS thematic study : interim report. Paris: ICOMOS.
- Rao, Kishore; Lopoukhine, Nikita; Jones, Kevin (2008). Mission report: Tasmanian Wilderness (Australia) (181bis), 15–20 March 2008. UNESCO.
- Dingwall, Paul Richard; Jones, Kevin L.; Egerton, Rachael, eds. (2009). In care of the Southern Ocean: an archaeological and historical survey of the Auckland Islands. New Zealand Archaeological Association Monograph. Auckland [N.Z.]: New Zealand Archaeological Association. ISBN 978-0-9582977-0-7.
- Jones, K. L., & Wooller, B. (2022). Good shoes for Mr Petrie’s cottage: a rare excavated New Zealand example of a cob foundation in the British tradition. Australasian Historical Archaeology, 39, 38–43. https://www.jstor.org/stable/27168996
