= Jennie Macandrew =

Jennie Macandrew (6 September 1866–24 December 1949) was a New Zealand pianist, organist, music teacher and conductor. She was born in Dunedin, New Zealand on 6 September 1866. Her parents were George Richard West and Mary Elizabeth Newman
