= Kevin Jones (footballer) =

Welsh footballer

Personal information
- Full name: Kevin Richard Jones
- Date of birth: 16 February 1974 (age 52)
- Place of birth: Wrexham, Wales
- Position: Right-back

Youth career
- Wrexham

Senior career*
Years	Team	Apps	(Gls)
1990–1994	Wrexham	9	(0)
1994–1997	Bangor City		
1997	Holywell Town		
1997–1999	Flint Town United		
2000–2007	Lex XI		
- * Club domestic league appearances and goals

Kevin Richard Jones (born 16 February 1974) is a Welsh former professional footballer who played as a right-back. He made appearances in the English Football League for Wrexham. He also played in the Welsh League for Bangor City, Holywell Town, Flint Town United and Lex XI.
