= Frederick Thomas Seelye =

New Zealand chemist (1879–1955 or 1962)

Frederick Thomas Seelye FRSNZ (1879–1962) was a New Zealand analytical chemist and lecturer. He was born in Dunedin, Otago, New Zealand in 1879. He became an instructor of mathematics and chemistry at the Waihi School of Mines in 1902, and in 1920 he was hired by the Dominion Laboratory as the chief silicate analyst.

He was elected a Fellow of the New Zealand Institute of Chemistry in 1943, and Fellow of the Royal Society Te Apārangi in 1944. Seelye had a wife, Flora Annabella Nicholson, and they had two sons and a daughter. He died in Wellington, New Zealand at the age of 83.
