= Alexandra Redoubt, Pirongia =

Military fortification in New Zealand

Alexandra Redoubt
- Pirongia, New Zealand
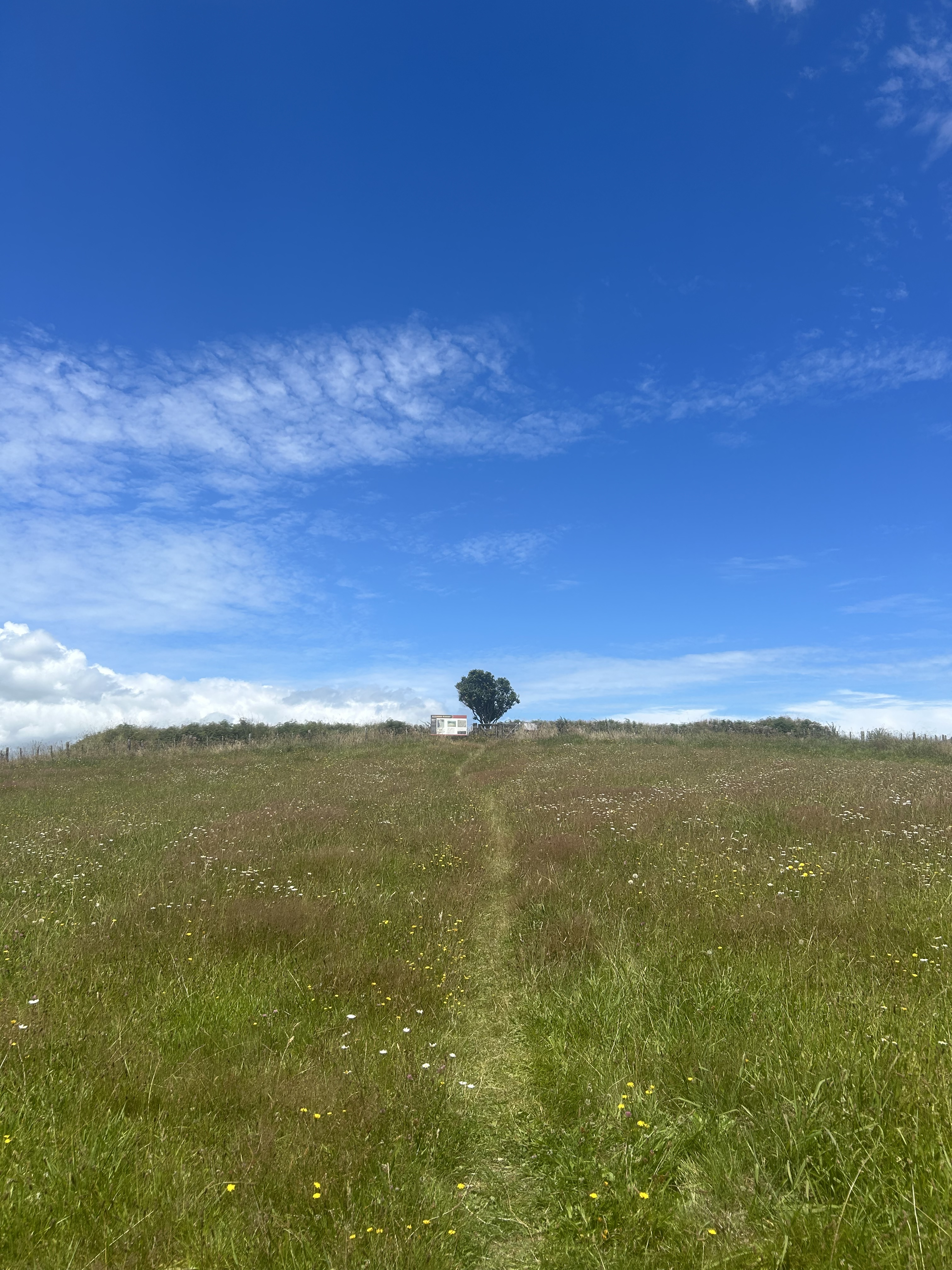
- A view of Alexandra Redoubt at the crest of the hill in the centre

Site information
- Type: Redoubt
- Owner: Heritage New Zealand
- Open to the public: Yes

Location
- Coordinates: 37°59′40″S 175°11′51″E.

Site history
- Built: October 1872
- Materials: Earthworks
- Battles/wars: New Zealand Wars

Garrison information
- Garrison: Armed Constabulary

Alexandra Redoubt is a fortification of the New Zealand Wars, located at what is now known as Pirongia, New Zealand. It was built in 1872 and manned by personnel of the Armed Constabulary until 1881. It is now a historic reserve owned and maintained by Heritage New Zealand.

== Background ==
Alexandra was a settlement in the Waikato, only 2 kilometres (1.2 mi) north of the border to the King Country, a region controlled by the Kīngitanga Māori movement and which was prohibited to Europeans. Founded during the Waikato Wars, Alexandra served as a military outpost and two redoubts, known as Alexandra West and Alexandra East respectively, were built here by the 2nd Waikato Militia. The redoubts, manned by the militia, were part of the frontier defences along the boundary of the King Country which extended to Cambridge, to the east, until 1868. At that time, the 2nd Waikato Militia was disbanded.

With the militia gone, the remaining residents of Alexandra agitated for a fortification to be manned by the Armed Constabulary as protection against the Māori to the south. The two redoubts built by the militia had fallen into disrepair so in the interim, earthworks were thrown up on an elevation known as Piquet Hill, after its use as an observation post by the 2nd Waikato Militia in previous years. A church, St Saviour's, had been built there in 1866 and the earthworks were thrown around the building. Then in 1871, the Government purchased the site for the Armed Constabulary. After the earthworks were leveled, the church building was moved into the town and Alexandra Redoubt erected the following year.

== Description ==
A redoubt is a type of fortification which, since it did not require timber elements, could be constructed relatively quickly by troops in the field. Usually taking a square or rectangular plan form, they were prepared by excavating a ditch to a depth of around 1.8 metres (5.9 ft) to define the perimeter of the redoubt. The dug out earth was piled up on the inner side of the ditch to form a parapet, the reverse side being profiled to include a firing step. The overall height of the parapet, from the base of the ditch to its top, would be around 4.2 metres (14 ft).

Alexandra Redoubt has a rectangular plan, of about 33 by 22 metres (108 ft × 72 ft), with bastions provided to all four corners to cover the sides of the fortification and allow defenders to fire into the surrounding ditch. The parapet and bastions were much more substantial structures than the previous earthworks that were constructed on the site. A blockhouse was constructed within the confines of the redoubt. The entire fortification was completed in October 1872.

== History ==
Following the construction of Alexandra Redoubt, it was manned by personnel of the Armed Constabulary. However, in 1881, the Māori King, Tāwhiao, reached a peace with the Government. As a result, the Armed Constabulary was withdrawn from the area. With the redoubt now surplus to requirements, the land on which it was built was sold to the Anglican Diocese. A church was subsequently built within the interior of the redoubt and access opened up with the installation of a bridge across the northern ditch. In 1959 the church was removed and the site subsequently transferred into the ownership of the Historic Places Trust.

Positioned to the west of the main street of present-day Pirongia (formerly Alexandra), Alexandra Redoubt is presently grassed with some bush coverage and, with repairs having been made in 1994, is in good condition. It is a historic reserve and is accessed from Bellot Street. Writing in 2001, archaeologist Neville Ritchie described it as the "best preserved of the surviving redoubts in the Waikato". The site is one of the properties owned and maintained by Heritage New Zealand, the successor to the Historic Places Trust.
