= Jan McLean =

New Zealand artist

Jan McLean is a retired dollmaker from Dunedin in New Zealand.

McLean's first dolls, "Chloe" and "Phoebe" were created in 1987. In 1991, she exhibited at the American International Toy Fair in New York City, where her doll "Pansy" won a Dolls Award for Excellence.

Many of McLean's dolls are made of porcelain, but she has also produced smaller versions of the porcelain originals since 2003 in vinyl polymer, known as "Lollipop Girls".

In 2009, she retired from dollmaking.
