= Wairau Bar =

Archeologically important gravel bar on the South Island of New Zealand

- Te Pokohiwi
- Aerial view of Wairau Bar from the northwest

- Location within New Zealand
- Location: Marlborough, New Zealand
- Nearest town: Blenheim
- Coordinates: 41°29′54″S 174°03′01″E

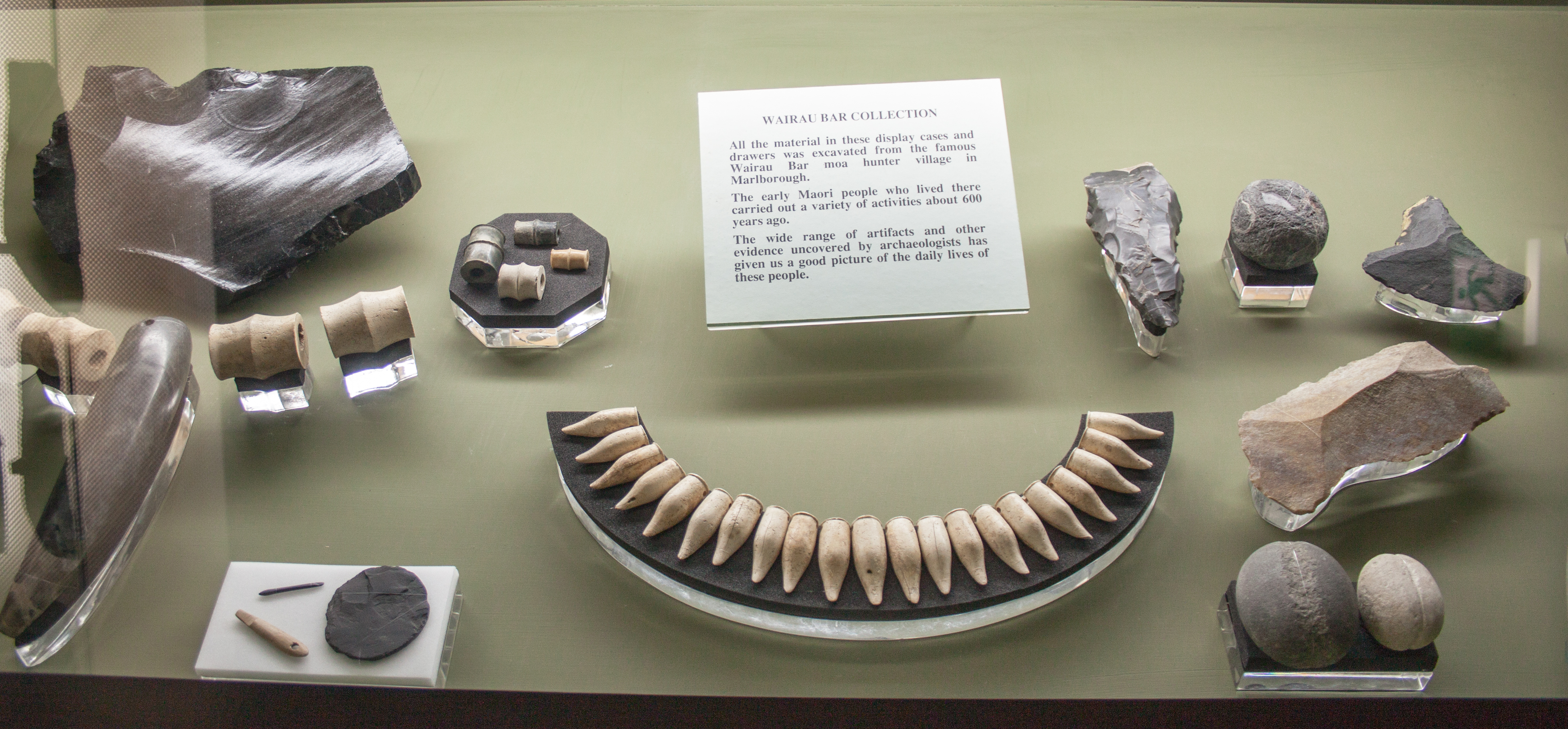
Early Māori objects from Wairau Bar

The Wairau Bar, or Te Pokohiwi, is a 19-hectare (47-acre) gravel bar formed where the Wairau River meets the sea in Cloudy Bay, Marlborough, north-eastern South Island, New Zealand. It is an important archaeological site, settled by explorers from East Polynesia who arrived in New Zealand about 1280. It is one of the earliest known human settlements in New Zealand. At the time of the occupation it is believed to have been a low scrub-covered island 2 to 3 metres (7 to 10 ft) high, 1.1 kilometres (0.68 mi) long and 0.4 kilometres (0.25 mi) wide.

== Discovery ==
The site was discovered in 1939 by then schoolboy Jim Eyles who, in 1942, found more artefacts. Early investigations with Roger Duff unearthed a burial site. Bones were scattered and close to the surface. This was originally believed to have been due to ploughing, but work by Bruce McFadgen shows that at some stage, probably between the two periods of occupation, the site was subject to either large storm surge waves or a tsunami which probably contributed to the scattering. Using the techniques of the time about 2,000 artefacts and 44 human skeletons were removed and examined in detail. The record seems to show that the partial skeletons of several children were found in shallow graves but these were in such poor condition and scattered that Duff was either unable or unwilling to keep the fragments using the methods of those days. The examination showed that the people were using the same cultural methods as those in eastern Polynesia, particularly the Marquesas Islands. Sixty-nine adzes were found at Wairau Bar, of which only three were made of greenstone. Eighty small, one-piece, triangular, stone or bone fishing lures with lashed unbarbed hook were found.

== Human remains ==
In 2009 a more modern analysis by Buckley et al found the skeletons had a range of estimated ages. None of the skeletons were from elderly people. The oldest was 39 and the second oldest was 36. Most of the skeletons were from people aged in their 20s. No children and only one teenager's skeleton was found. This is consistent with younger people being buried elsewhere, a practice that was quite common in the South Pacific. There was only one child's skeleton. The 21 skeletons with teeth all exhibited some developmental enamel disorders, showing they had suffered long stressful periods during childhood but survived to reasonably healthy adulthood. Tooth decay was rare, especially amongst males (a similar trait to Neolithic people of the Americas (North American Indians). Many of the skeletons showed multiple signs of stress such as Harris lines (on X-rays of long bones such as the tibia) caused by either infection or a poor diet. Tooth wear was substantial among older individuals, with teeth worn to the roots, but this did not seem to be due to bracken fern root chewing. All the adults showed healed bone fractures, indicating a well-balanced diet and a supportive community structure. Several skeletons showed features that are interpreted as being caused by tuberculosis (TB). The presence of TB was yet to be confirmed by DNA analysis in 2010. Anaemia was common, as was arthritis. The average height of the males was 175 centimetres (69 in) and the females 161 centimetres (63 in). These figures show that the early colonisers were tall compared to most Polynesians. The skeletons were all found in shallow graves, with the heads pointing towards the east and the feet to the west, as was the practice in eastern Polynesia. The archaeological layers were shallow.

=== DNA study ===
Lisa Matisoo-Smith and Michael Knapp from New Zealand's Otago University have released the results of a recent bone and teeth DNA study carried out on early Polynesian migrants to New Zealand who lived at Wairau Bar about 1285–1300 AD. The results of DNA analysis reinforce the idea that some of these people were original settlers from East Polynesia, as they had a very different diet based on soft starchy food. The two other burial groups showed a very different, more varied diet consistent with being raised in New Zealand. Scientists found that there was a wide range of DNA mutations indicating that settlers were part of a reasonably large group. This indicated a planned migration rather than isolated random groups. One of the mutations was associated with insulin rejection as found in type 2 diabetes. This reinforces the mathematical modelling done earlier that shows the same pattern. Work will now begin on tracing East Polynesian populations that have the same DNA mutations in order to discover the specific homelands of the Wairau Bar settlers. The DNA pattern is very similar to that found in the Marquesas Islands in East Polynesia at the same time.

== Site use ==
The later 2009–2010 study, using more precise modern methods, resulted in the site being more accurately dated by the radiocarbon method to 1288–1300 CE. The site appeared to be occupied twice over a period of about 20 years, which is consistent with information from other early Polynesian colonisation sites in New Zealand. Accurate dates were obtained from moa egg fragments found in grave and midden sites. Buried with the skeletons were moa bone reel necklaces, whole moa eggs (used as water carriers), argillite adze heads, carved serpentine that looked like shark and whale teeth, harpoon heads and tattoo chisels. Few nephrite (jade or greenstone) artefacts were found. It is believed the site was primarily a factory for making stone adze heads. It has been estimated from the adze heads found and the large area of stone flakes that about 12,000 adze heads were made here or about 400 to 500 per year. Argillite, the most common adze head material is hard, compressed mudstone. It is found at D'Urville Island only 100 kilometres (62 mi) away from Wairau Bar. A Māori argillite quarry is located in the hills behind Nelson City. Such large numbers of adze heads have implications about trade in the early archaic period. One adze found in the 2009 study has been identified by archaeologist Richard Walter as Tahanga basalt from Tahanga Hill near Opito, a well known moahunter area. It was of quadrangular shape (known as Type 1), identical in design to those used in the Cook Islands at the same time. Also found were chert from Kaikōura, which was commonly used for making holes, pumice from the volcanic plateau, which was used as floats and for making small handheld fire bowls and small amounts of greenstone from the West Coast which was made into two adze heads. This indicates that the Wairau Bar moa hunters travelled extensively through New Zealand exploring the land. Adze heads are associated with shaping wood, especially in the making of waka. The stone head was lashed to an L-shaped natural crook and swung so the blade struck the wood more or less horizontally.

An investigation by a team from Otago University found a huge stone-lined umu or hāngī pit (earth oven) 1.5 metres (4.9 ft) deep by 4 metres (13 ft) across—estimated to be big enough to feed 1000 people by a local Māori familiar with modern hāngī. However, these large hāngī or umu pits were identified in 1968 (in the Kermadecs) by Roger Duff, as being typical Polynesian umu ti. The purpose of the large pit was to cook the taproot of the ti plant. This was a common method of reducing the tuberous root to a sugary pulp. The ti can be cultivated easily but is slow growing. The root is about 900 millimetres (35 in) long by 90 millimetres (3.5 in) wide, to a point. It is cooked very slowly in an umu for 12 to 24 hours. The plant is usually associated with the far north of New Zealand but may have been grown further south during the warmer climatic period associated with early Polynesian settlement. A geophysics study showed that it was only one of six such pits in a rough horseshoe shape on the edge of a lagoon. The study also showed the site to be much bigger than previously thought—at least 11 hectares (27 acres) and possibly larger as two boundaries have not been accurately plotted. At least 50 percent of the area was intact.

By 2007 only 2 percent of the site had been scientifically investigated. "Intact" skeletons (many minus the head) were found in four groups, with the oldest (1–7) being closer to the sea and at the western end of the site. These have been shown by DNA studies to be people who had lived in East Polynesia. The largest group of skeletons (15–43) were in an area to the east which covered an oval area 30 by 50 metres (98 by 164 ft). These people are believed to be moa hunters who lived their lives in New Zealand, based on bone and teeth DNA analysis. The main habitation area was central, about 25 to 50 metres (82 to 164 ft) from the southern lagoon edge. There were three zones of cooking and surface midden debris, all about 100 by 30 metres (328 by 98 ft) approximately. The earliest zone was alongside the lagoon and the latter on the ocean side of the island. At the time of the second occupation of the island, the second site was protected from the ocean by a long and narrow boulder bank. There are two adze-making sites—one adjacent to the early occupation zone and the second adjacent to the later burial site. The most intensely studied indicates a right handed person sitting in the porch area of a small whare. They sat in front of a flat stone on a path cobbled with small round rocks, chipping off flakes of argillite with a hammer stone of quartzite. The limited studies done so far indicate a sizeable village. It is apparent that bodies were commonly buried about 60 metres (200 ft) from the cooking and working zones.

=== Exploitation of fauna ===
After being used for cooking, each umu had subsequently been used as a midden. The bottom layer of the midden showed that at the very earliest occupation time shellfish, such as mussels, were much larger, averaging 250 millimetres (9.8 in) long. The lower layers of the midden also showed that early moa bones were not smashed to get at the marrow as was common in the upper layers. Whale bones were found in the lower layer. Mainly moa leg bones were found indicating that moa were hunted inland and brought to the site for cooking. More than 4000 moa were consumed at the site. Bones from all five moa species located in the upper South Island were found. As well as the remains of numerous butchered moa, seals, porpoises, the extinct Haast's eagle, Eyles' harrier, New Zealand swan and New Zealand raven, kurī (Māori dogs), tuatara, kiore, shellfish such as pipi, pāua, cockles, and marine bones from eels, skate, sunfish and sharks were found there. Anderson and Smith in their 1996 study stated that the first colonists enjoyed a sustained assault on the local megafauna.

At the time of the latest investigation the local Rangitāne Iwi reburied 60 skeletons claimed to be their forebears in a formal ceremony at the lagoon site.

=== Shell link to East Polynesia ===
A study of a turret shell artefact completed in 2011 shows a direct link between the Wairau Bar site and East Polynesia. This is only the second artefact found in New Zealand originating from East Polynesia dated to the early Polynesian colonial period. (The other is the early East Polynesian pearl lure found at Tairua identified by A. Powell of Auckland Museum.) The shell tool is a modified spiral gastropod shell. These tools were used as small chisels or gouges, possibly for enlarging holes. The point of the turret shell was removed and the remains honed to a chisel point of about 60 degrees by grinding. Although found in various East Polynesian Islands the most common site by far is Fa'ahia, Huahine, in the Society Islands, where many have been located from the same period. The significance of the find that was dug up 60 years ago was not realised until recently.
