= Arthur George William Sparrow =

New Zealand artist, photographer and businessman

Arthur George William Sparrow (1896–1967) was a notable New Zealand commercial artist, photographer and businessman. He was born in Dunedin, New Zealand, in 1896.
