= Richard Walter (archaeologist) =

New Zealand archaeologist

- Born: Richard Knowles Walter; 1944 (age 81–82)
- Education: University of Auckland
- Known for: Work at the Wairau Bar
- Scientific career
- Fields: Archaeology, Prehistory of the Pacific
- Thesis: The Southern Cook Islands in Eastern Polynesian prehistory (1990)

Richard Knowles Walter (born 1944) is a New Zealand archaeologist who specialises in the archaeology of the tropical Pacific and New Zealand. His early work focused on East Polynesian colonisation and his PhD tested new models for the colonisation of East Polynesia based on field research he carried out in the Cook Islands. He is best known for his work on the archaeology of Wairau Bar.

He did his BA and PhD in anthropology at the University of Auckland with his thesis titled The Southern Cook Islands in Eastern Polynesian prehistory. He then moved to the University of Otago, where he is currently a professor. He is also an honorary professor at the University of Queensland. His work at Wairau Bar is carried out with the active support of the local Rangitāne Iwi and funding from the Marsden Fund. He became a fellow of the Royal Society Te Apārangi in 2013.
