= Claire Beynon =

New Zealand artist

Claire Beynon (born 1960) is a South African artist based in Dunedin, New Zealand. She was born in Johannesburg. She works in charcoal and pastel on paper, and has worked in mixed media, notably in the unusual material of slate.

In 2010 she was awarded the Antarctica Service Medal for her "valuable contributions to exploration and scientific achievement" in Antarctica. Beynon's work Katherine Mansfield: Story after Story was included in Landfall Exhibition, held at the Dunedin Railway Station in May-June 2018. This work was inspired by Emma Neale's review of Kathleen Jones' biography of Katherine Mansfield.
