= Bruce McFadgen =

New Zealand surveyor and archaeologist

Bruce Gordon McFadgen (born 1943) is a New Zealand surveyor and archaeologist.

McFadgen qualified as a land surveyor at the University of Otago, and worked for the Department of Lands and Survey until 1968. He then completed a Bachelor of Arts and Master of Arts degrees in anthropology at Otago, followed by a PhD in geology at Victoria University of Wellington in 1979, before working as a staff archaeologist for the New Zealand Historic Places Trust.

McFadgen was employed by the Department of Conservation from 1987 to 2003, when he took early retirement to take up the 2003 JD Stout Fellowship at the Stout Research Centre. He has served on the Royal Society of New Zealand's Skinner Research Fund Committee since 1987, as president of the New Zealand Archaeological Association from 1986 to 1988, and as editor of the journal of the New Zealand Institute of Surveyors.

== Publications ==
McFadgen has over 70 refereed publications, including monographs and book chapters. He also authored the book:

- McFadgen, Bruce (2007). Hostile Shores: Catastrophic Events in Prehistoric New Zealand and their Impact on Maori Coastal Communities. Auckland: Auckland University Press. ISBN 9781869403904.
