= Grant Cederwall =

New Zealand sportsman

Personal information
- Full name: Grant Newton Cederwall
- Born: 4 July 1959 (age 67); Dunedin, Otago, New Zealand
- Batting: Right-handed
- Bowling: Right-arm medium

Domestic team information
- Years: Team
- 1978/79–1990/91: Wellington
- 1983: Bedfordshire

Career statistics
Competition	First-class	List A
Matches	35	28
Runs scored	794	199
Batting average	19.36	10.47
100s/50s	0/2	0/0
Top score	68	37
Balls bowled	4,448	1,066
Wickets	73	28
Bowling average	34.08	24.46
5 wickets in innings	1	1
10 wickets in match	0	0
Best bowling	7/97	5/17
Catches/stumpings	14/–	9/–
- Source: Cricinfo, 28 July 2019

Grant Newton Cederwall (born 4 July 1959) is a New Zealand former cricketer and rugby union player.

Cederwall was born at Dunedin in July 1959. He made his debut in first-class cricket for Wellington against Central Districts at Napier in the 1978–79 Shell Trophy. He played first-class cricket for Wellington until November 1990, making a total of 35 appearances. Playing as an all-rounder, he scored 794 runs in his 35 first-class matches, at an average of 19.36 and a highest score of 68. With his right-arm medium pace bowling, he took 73 wickets at a bowling average of 34.08. He took a five wicket haul once, with figures of 7 for 97 against Northern Districts in the 1988–89 Shell Trophy. Cederwall also played List A one-day cricket for Wellington, debuting in that format against Central Districts at Wanganui in the 1982–83 Shell Cup. He played List A cricket for Wellington until January 1989, making a total of 28 appearances. He was less effective as a batsman in one-day cricket, scoring 199 runs at an average of 10.47, with a high score of 37. With the ball, he took 28 wickets an average of 24.46 and best figures of 5 for 17. These figures, one of two five wicket hauls he took in one-day cricket, came against Canterbury in the 1984–85 Shell Cup. In addition to playing first-class and List A cricket in New Zealand, Cederwall also played minor counties cricket in England for Bedfordshire in 1983, making five appearances in the Minor Counties Championship and a single appearance in the MCCA Knockout Trophy.

Outside of playing cricket, Cederwall also played rugby union, representing Wellington in a single match in 1979. Cederwall currently works as a real estate agent. In 1999, he was a founding member of the Wellington-based Tommy's Real Estate Ltd. His brother, Brian Cederwall, played rugby union over a hundred times for Wellington.
