= Atholl Anderson =

New Zealand archaeologist and anthropologist (born 1943)

Atholl Anderson CNZM
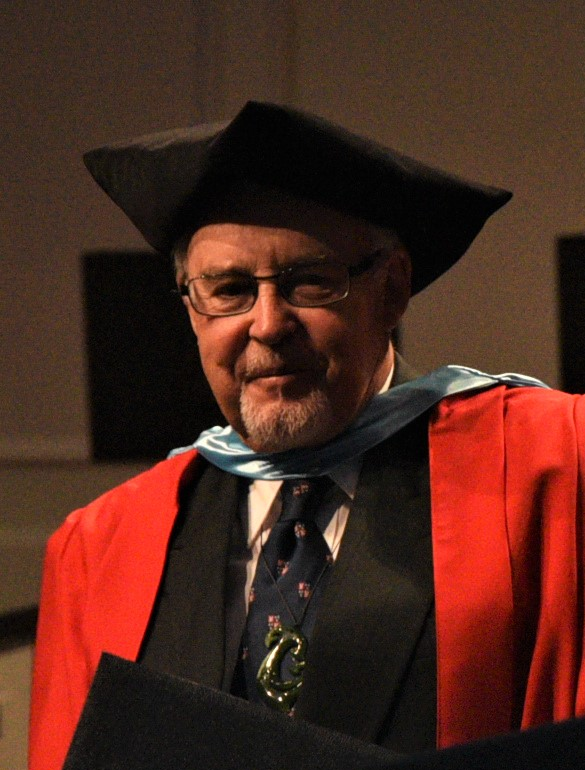
- Anderson in 2015
- Born: Atholl John Anderson; 1943 (age 82–83); Hāwera, New Zealand

Academic background
- Education: University of Cambridge
- Thesis: Prehistoric Competition and Economic Change in Northern Sweden (1976)

Academic work
- Discipline: Archaeology
- Institutions: University of Otago; Australian National University

Atholl John Anderson CNZM (born 1943) is a New Zealand archaeologist who has worked extensively in New Zealand and the Pacific. His work is notable for its syntheses of history, biology, ethnography and archaeological evidence. He made a major contribution to the evidence given by the Ngāi Tahu iwi to the Waitangi Tribunal.

== Early life ==
Anderson was born in 1943 in Hāwera and is descended from Ngāi Tahu on Stewart Island. He grew up in Dunedin and Nelson. Anderson was educated at Otago Boys' High School, and then, from 1958 to 1961, at Nelson College, where he played in the school's 1st XI hockey team in 1960 and 1961.

== Education ==
Anderson conducted a survey of archaeological sites in Tasman Bay for his Master of Arts degree in geography from the University of Canterbury, which he received in 1966. His master's thesis title was Maori occupation sites in back beach deposits around Tasman Bay. He then completed a Diploma in Teaching and in 1968 became assistant principal of a school in Karamea on the West Coast of the South Island. In 1970, he began a Master of Arts degree in anthropology at the University of Otago, which he completed in 1973 with first-class honours. His thesis was on subsistence behaviour at Black Rocks Peninsula in Palliser Bay, where he participated in a University of Otago archaeology research project from 1969 to 1972. He received a Commonwealth Scholarship that enabled him to go to the University of Cambridge, where he undertook fieldwork in northern Sweden and completed his PhD thesis, Prehistoric competition and economic change in northern Sweden, in 1976.

== Career ==
Anderson took up his first academic position in 1977 at the University of Auckland. The following year, he was appointed as an assistant lecturer in the anthropology department at the University of Otago, progressing to a personal chair in the department. He left Otago in 1993 to take up the Establishment Chair of Prehistory at the Australian National University in Canberra.

On his return to Otago in 1978, Anderson commenced a major programme of fieldwork, the Southern Hunters Project, at 20 sites in southern New Zealand. Important sites were excavated at Pūrākaunui, Lee Island in Lake Te Anau and the Shag River mouth. The focus of many of the excavations was on prehistoric economics, the use of the marine environment and moa hunting. As a result, Anderson examined the chronology of colonisation and re-dated moa hunting sites throughout New Zealand such as at Wairau Bar and Houhora.

After moving to Canberra in 1993, Anderson undertook fieldwork throughout the Pacific Ocean as part of two projects, the Indo-Pacific Colonisation Project and the Asian Fore-Arc Project. Themes of his work were the sequence of settlement of the islands of the Pacific, migration, dispersal, voyaging and sustainability. His other interests in birds, fauna and extinction resulted in an extinct Fijian crocodile, Volia athollandersoni, being named after him.

Anderson followed up his earlier work in southern New Zealand with the Southern Margins Project, which commenced in 1998. It showed that Polynesian voyaging into the sub-polar regions (Chatham, Rakiura and Auckland Islands) occurred about 700 years ago. In 2007, with Ian Smith, he undertook a Department of Conservation project on Codfish Island / Whenua Hou to investigate the history and archaeology of the island.

While he is primarily an archaeologist, Anderson has used archaeology, history and ethnography extensively in his work. In an interview about his 1998 book The Welcome of Strangers: an Ethnohistory of Southern Maori AD 1650–1850, he described it as a book that "draws together the disparate sources of information about later southern Māori in an attempt to describe, in some detail, the origins and migrations of the historical peoples, their social and economic organisation, their distribution in the landscape and their responses to the arrival of European culture." In 2015, he collaborated with historians Judith Binney and Aroha Harris to publish Tangata Whenua: a History, which won an Ockham New Zealand Book Award in 2016. The authors used environmental science, geology, linguistics, archaeology and history to investigate the migration and settlement of New Zealand.

In addition to his academic work, Anderson has served on the board of the New Zealand Historic Places Trust and as an advisor to Te Rūnanga o Ngāi Tahu. He researched Ngāi Tahu's Treaty of Waitangi claim to the Waitangi Tribunal. Anderson's book, Te Puoho's Last Raid: The march from Golden Bay to Southland in 1836 and defeat at Tuturau, published in 1986, was listed in Books of Mana as one of the 180 most significant works of Māori-authored non-fiction. Tangata Whenua: An illustrated history, co-authored with Aroha Harris, was also included in that book.

Anderson retired in 2008 to live in the Wairau Valley, Marlborough.

== Awards and honours ==
- 1991 Fellow of the Royal Society of New Zealand
- 1996 Fellow of the Australian Academy of the Humanities
- 1996 James Cook Research Fellowship
- 2000 Centenary Medal
- 2002 Fellow of the Society of Antiquaries of London
- 2002 Doctorate of Science, University of Cambridge
- 2006 Companion of the New Zealand Order of Merit, for services to anthropology and archaeology
- 2015 Humanities Aronui Medal, Royal Society of New Zealand
- 2016 Prime Minister's Award for Literary Achievement
- 2019 Honorary Doctor of Laws, University of Otago

== Selected publications ==
- Anderson, Atholl (1983). When all the moa ovens grew cold : nine centuries of changing fortune for the southern Māori. Dunedin: Otago Heritage Books.
- Anderson, Atholl (1986). Te Puoho's last raid : the march from Golden Bay to Southland in 1836 and defeat at Tuturau. Dunedin: Otago Heritage Books.
- Anderson, Atholl (1989). Prodigious birds : moas and moa-hunting in prehistoric New Zealand. Cambridge University Press.
- Anderson, Atholl (1998). The welcome of strangers : an ethnohistory of southern Maori A.D. 1650–1850. Dunedin: Otago University Press.
- Smith, Ian; Anderson, Atholl (2009). "An Archaeological Sequence for Codfish Island (Whenua Hou), Southland, New Zealand". New Zealand Journal of Archaeology. 30: 5–21.
- Anderson, Atholl; Binney, Judith; Harris, Aroha (2015). Tangata whenua : a history. Wellington: Bridget Williams Books.
- Anderson, Atholl J.; Barrett, James Harold; Boyle, Katherine V. (2010). The global origins and development of seafaring. Cambridge: McDonald Institute for Archaeological Research. ISBN 9781902937526.
- Anderson, Atholl (2023). "The Origins of Prehistoric Sailing Technologies in the Pacific Ocean". In Fitzpatrick, Scott M.; Erlandson, Jon (eds.). The Oxford handbook of island and coastal archaeology. Oxford University Press. doi:10.1093/oxfordhb/9780197607770.013.3. ISBN 9780197607992.
- Anderson, Atholl John (12 August 2025). "'Hardy rascals of doubtful fame' Historical perspectives upon sealers in southern New Zealand: Ian Smith Memorial Lecture 2025". Journal of Pacific Archaeology. 15 (1): 7. doi:10.70460/jpa.v15i1.378. ISSN 1179-4712.

== See also ==
- ʻAta – an island at the southern end of the Tongan archipelago
- Moeraki
- Palmerston, New Zealand
- Polynesia
