= Helen Leach =

New Zealand food anthropologist (1945–2026)

Helen Leach ONZM
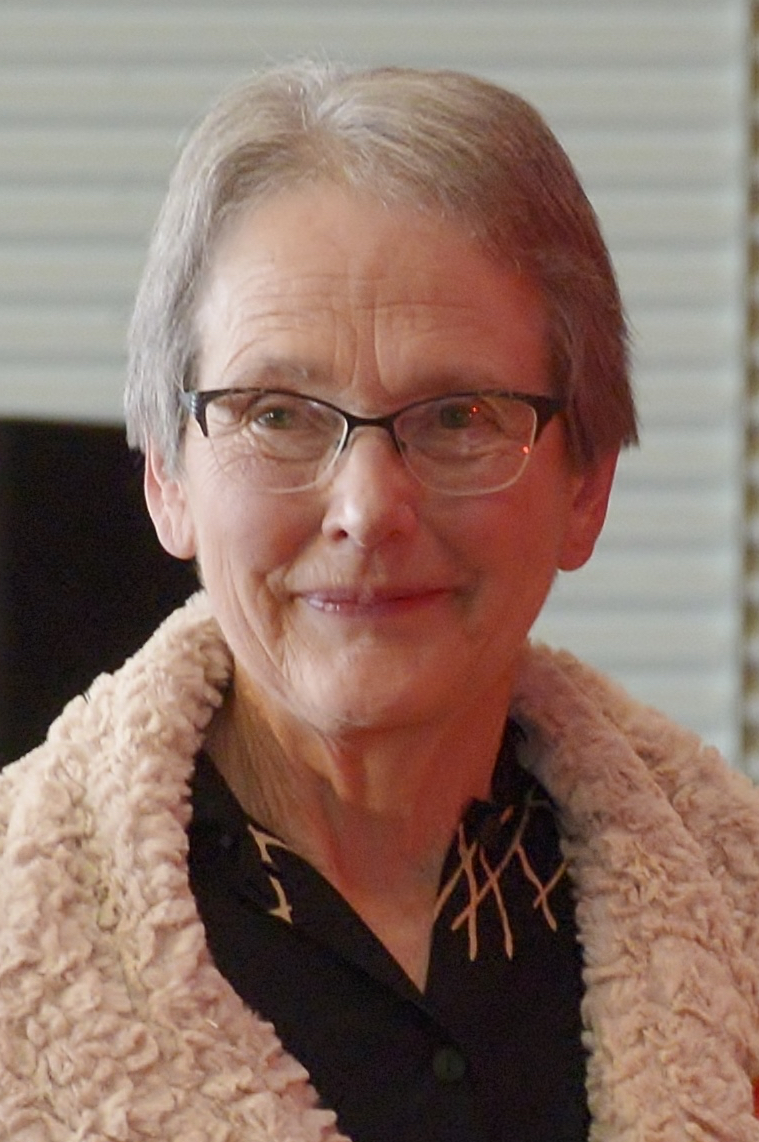
- Leach in 2018
- Born: Helen May Keedwell; 3 July 1945; Wellington, New Zealand
- Died: 23 January 2026 (aged 80); Christchurch, New Zealand
- Education: University of Otago
- Relatives: Nancy Tichborne (sister)
- Scientific career
- Workplaces: University of Otago
- Thesis: Horticulture in prehistoric New Zealand: an investigation of the function of the stone walls of Palliser Bay (1976)
- Doctoral advisor: Charles Higham

Helen May Leach ONZM (née Keedwell; 3 July 1945 – 23 January 2026) was a New Zealand academic who specialised in food anthropology. She conducted research for more than 50 years into the history of New Zealand, the archaeology and anthropology of Oceanic culture, and the social history and anthropology of culinary and horticultural practices, and wrote at least 22 books on these subjects. She was a professor emerita at the University of Otago.

== Early life and education ==
Born Helen May Keedwell in Wellington on 3 July 1945, Leach was the daughter of Peggy and Harvey Keedwell. Her sisters were cookbook author Mary (later Browne) and watercolour artist Nancy (later Tichborne).

After moving with her family to Dunedin in the early 1950s, Leach and her sisters were educated at Otago Girls' High School. After joining the Otago Anthropological Society as a teenager, she went on to enrol at the University of Otago in 1963, from where she graduated Master of Arts.

Originally trained in archaeology, she completed a PhD in 1976 at Otago, with a thesis titled Horticulture in prehistoric New Zealand: an investigation of the function of the stone walls of Palliser Bay, with Charles Higham as her doctoral advisor. In the 1960's she was the first woman at the University of Otago to gain a Masters degree in anthropology, and also the first woman to obtain a PhD in anthropology.

== Career ==
Leach joined the staff of the University of Otago in 1972, and was appointed to a chair in anthropology in 2002.

Leach was renowned for her research into the origins of pavlova and Christmas cakes, writing several cook books touching the topic. Her work on the origins of the pavlova dessert, resulted in a book The Pavlova Story — A slice of New Zealand’s culinary history (2008). She also had an interest in prehistoric horticulture, human domestication, the evolution of the human diet, and the history of cooking and kitchens. Because of her interest in traditional Polynesian gardening practices, she was able to secure a Rhodes Visiting Fellowship, based at St Hilda's College from 1980–1981. She used this to study the role of kitchen gardening in New Zealand, leading her to write her next book 1,000 Years of Gardening in New Zealand (1984) and inspiring her next books that she wrote in the following years. Leach then lectured on human evolution before starting a new course at the University of Otago focussing on the evolution of the human diet in 1987.

With all of her academic achievements and affiliations, Leach was a member and supporter of many organisations, such as the Hocken Library, Royal Society of New Zealand (RSNZ), New Zealand Rhodes Scholar Association, New Zealand Federation of Graduate Women, Garden History Society, Otago Institute of Horticulture (RNZIH), and the Dunedin Botanic Gardens.

She studied food, eating, cooking, associated equipment and paraphernalia in New Zealand. Her interests ranged from prehistoric horticulture and the evolution of human diet to the history of cooking, the origins of recipes as well as the development of kitchens and batteries de cuisine in the twentieth century. Her extensive collection of over 2,000 cookery books, especially community cookbooks, provided a significant resource for colleagues' investigations, which compensated for the incompleteness of that in the National Library of New Zealand. Reviewing Leach's 2014 book Kitchens, Barbara Santich observed that "New Zealanders are indeed fortunate to have Helen Leach as guide, guardian and safe-keeper of their gastronomic past", noting too that the work was illustrated with images of artefacts from Leach's own personal collection.

Sisters Helen, Mary and Nancy worked together on a number of co-authored books about cooking and gardening, and breadmaking, the best known of which was probably The Cook's Garden: for cooks who garden and gardeners who cook (1980). Leach's book 1,000 Years of Gardening in New Zealand (1984), an anthropological history of gardening practices in New Zealand, was also illustrated by Tichborne.

== Honours ==
Leach was elected a Fellow of the Royal Society of New Zealand in 2004. When Leach retired from the University of Otago in 2008, she received a Garden History Award from the Royal New Zealand Institute of Horticulture for contributions to horticultural history and conservation, and was also granted the title of Professor Emerita.

In the 2018 Queen's Birthday Honours, she was appointed an Officer of the New Zealand Order of Merit (ONZM), for services to culinary anthropology. In 2019, Leach was considered by the National Executive to be the most worthy to be appointed the award of Associate of Honour of the Royal New Zealand Institute of Horticulture AHRIH(NZ).

== Death ==
On 23 January 2026, Leach died at George Manning Lifecare in Christchurch, at the age of 80. She is remembered through her many contributions to academia and horticultural discoveries.

== Bibliography ==
- —— (2014). Kitchens: the New Zealand Kitchen in the 20th Century. Dunedin: University of Otago Press. ISBN 9781877578373.
- ——, ed. (12 May 2010). From Kai to Kiwi kitchen : New Zealand's culinary traditions and cookbooks. Dunedin: Otago University Press. ISBN 9781877372759.
- —— (2008). The Pavlova Story: a slice of New Zealand's culinary history. Dunedin: Otago University Press. ISBN 9781877372575.
- —— (2000). Cultivating myths : fiction, fact & fashion in garden history. Auckland, N.Z.: Godwit. ISBN 1869620496.
- —— (1984). 1,000 Years of Gardening in New Zealand. Auckland: A.H. & A. W. Reed. ISBN 0-589-01488-9.
- Browne, Mary; Tichborne, Nancy; —— (1980). The Cook's Garden: for cooks who garden and gardeners who cook. Wellington: Reed. ISBN 9781877372575.
- Leach, B. Foss; ——, eds. (February 2001) [1979]. Prehistoric Man at Palliser Bay. Bulletin of the National Museum of New Zealand. Vol. 21. Wellington: Museum of New Zealand Te Papa Tongarewa. pp. 215–224. ISBN 978-0-9951384-1-4.
- —— (1969). Subsistence Patterns in Prehistoric N.Z. Dunedin: Anthropology Department, University of Otago.
- Hamel, Jill; – – (1977). Archaic occupation on a boulder beach: a report to the New Zealand Historic Places Trust on excavations at Long Beach, Otago. Dunedin. National Library.
- Skinner, H. D; Gathercole, Peter; Leach, Foss; – – (1974). Comparatively speaking: studies in Pacific material culture. Dunedin: University of Otago Press.
- Browne, Mary; Tichborne, Nancy; – – (2001). The cook's herb garden. Auckland, Godwit. ISBN 978-1-86962-041-7.
- Browne, Mary; Tichborne, Nancy; – – (1997). The cook's salad garden. Auckland, Godwit. ISBN 978-1-86962-002-8.
- – – (1972). A hundred years of Otago archaeology: a critical review. Records of the Otago Museum. Anthropology, no. 6. Dunedin: Otago Museum Trust Board.
- Leach, Foss; – – (1969). Archaeology in the Wairarapa. Dunedin: Anthropology Dept., University of Otago.
- Browne, Mary; Tichborne, Nancy; – – (1987). More from the cook's garden: for cooks who garden and gardeners who cook. Companion vol. to: The cook's garden. Auckland: Reed Methuen. ISBN 978-0-474-00209-0.
- Leach, Foss; – – (1969). Palliser Bay and the Lower Wairarapa Valley: archaeological research programme 1969-1972. Dunedin: Anthropology Dept., University of Otago.
- Browne, Mary; Inglis, Raelene; – – (2011). The twelve cakes of Christmas: an evolutionary history, with recipes. Dunedin: Otago University Press. ISBN 978-1-877578-19-9.
- Best, Simon; Witter, Dan; – – (1989). Report on the second phase of field work at the Tatiana-Matau site, American Samoa, July-August 1988. Auckland: Dept. of Anthropology, University of Auckland.
- – – (2014). Kitchens: The New Zealand Kitchen in the 20th Century. Dunedin: Otago University Press. ISBN 978-1-877578-37-3.
