= Foss Leach =

New Zealand archaeologist

Foss Leach CNZM
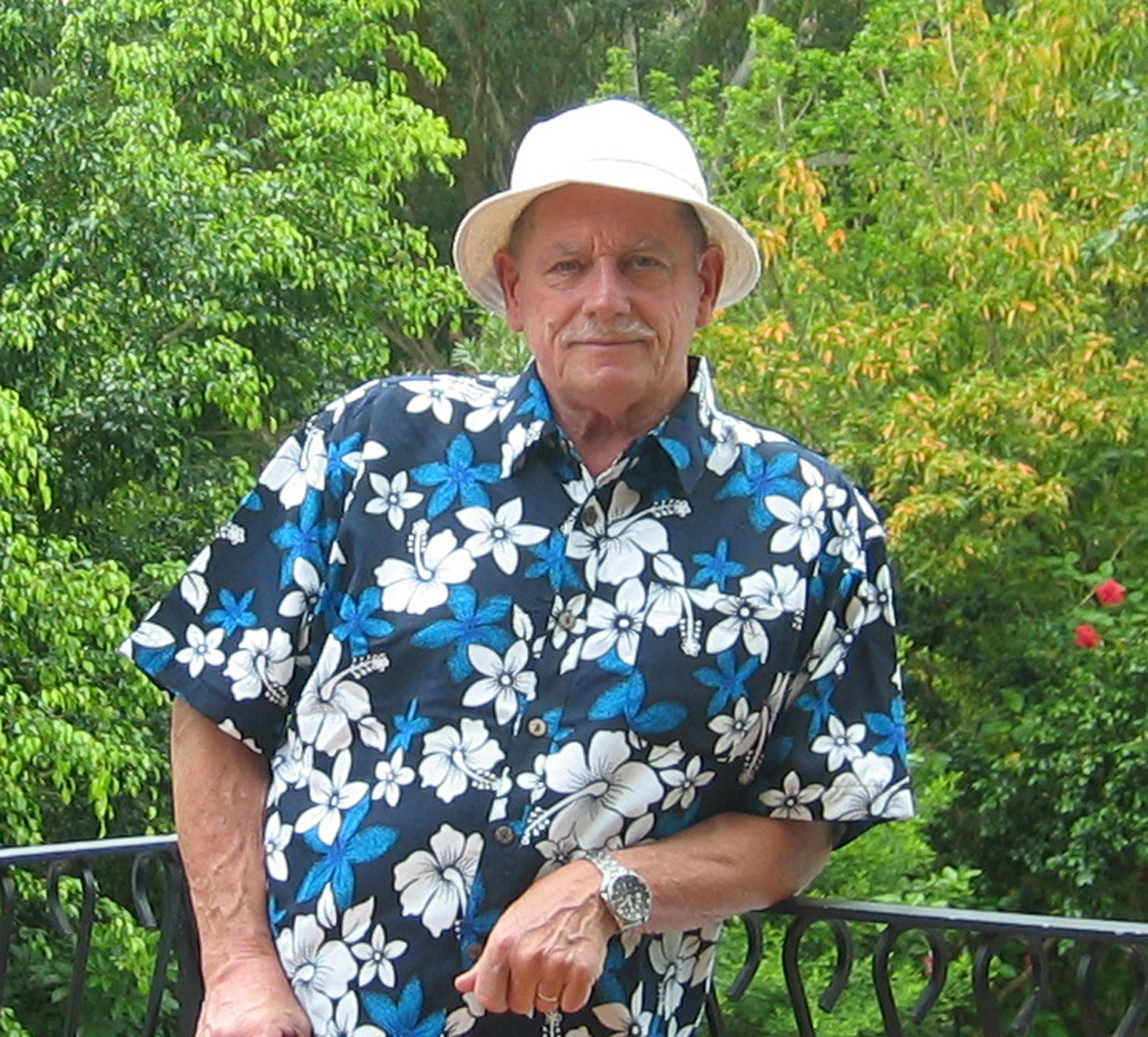
- Leach in 2011
- Born: Bryan Foss Leach; 16 February 1942 (age 84); Waipukurau, New Zealand
- Education: University of Otago
- Scientific career
- Fields: Archaeology
- Workplaces: University of Otago; Te Papa
- Thesis: Prehistoric communities in Palliser Bay, New Zealand (1976)
- Doctoral advisor: Charles Higham

Bryan Foss Leach CNZM (born 16 February 1942) is a New Zealand archaeologist. He is a pioneer of integrated regional research programmes, conservation of archaeological materials, zooarchaeology, and broader aspects of archaeological science.

He has been a strong advocate of collaborative cross-disciplinary research. Leach has served as an officer and committee member of numerous New Zealand and international organisations concerned with archaeology and cultural heritage management, and has held honorary fellowships in various institutions.

== Early life and education ==
Bryan Foss Leach, known as Foss, was born at Waipukurau, New Zealand, on 16 February 1942, and spent his formative years in Martinborough, with his sister Josephine Michelle and their parents Bernard Joseph Leach and Thelma Adele Foss. He attended boarding school at Palmerston North Boys' High School, where he chose science subjects throughout, although he excelled more in sports ventures than in the classroom. He went on to play representative rugby for Manawatu in 1961 and represented the University of Otago in boxing in 1962. Much of his life as a young adult was spent as a bushman: possum trapping, deer stalking, scrub-cutting, and working in shearing gangs. A chance attendance at an archaeological excavation being run by Les Groube at Karitane near Dunedin was the beginning of his career in archaeology.

He graduated Bachelor of Arts in anthropology in 1966, and Masters of Arts (Hons) in 1969. The MA thesis was published in the same year.

His doctorate was awarded in 1976.

== Teaching career ==
Leach began his teaching career as an undergraduate tutor in the Anthropology Department at the University of Otago from 1967 and joined the academic staff as a junior lecturer in 1969. He gained full tenure in 1971, was promoted to senior lecturer in 1978, and associate professor in 1986.

During his 20 years at Otago he taught courses on New Zealand and Pacific prehistory, the origins of civilisation, and archaeological methods, and also ran laboratory classes and field schools.

He retired from teaching in 1988 when he moved to Wellington to work at the Museum of New Zealand.

=== Archaeological laboratories ===
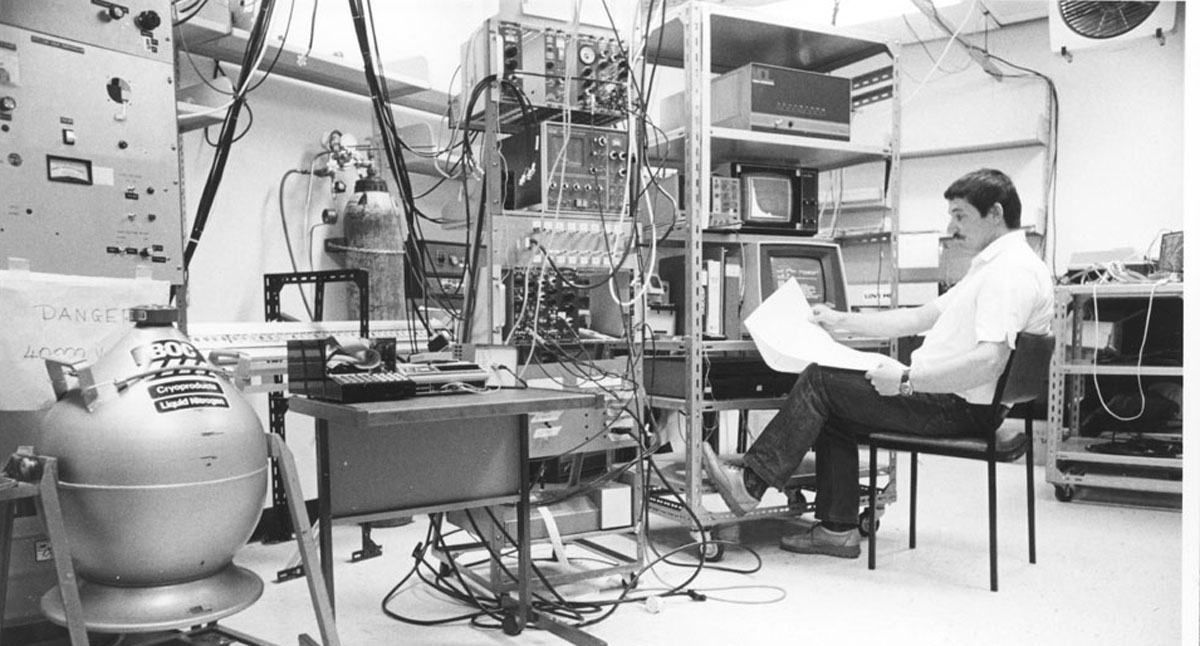
Foss Leach in the Archaeometry Laboratory, University of Otago, 1982

Leach's strong commitment to archaeological science and archaeometry was fostered during his undergraduate years by early correspondence with, and encouragement from, Martin Aitken, of the Research Laboratory for Archaeology and the History of Art in Oxford. Under Aitken's instruction and guidance he built a proton magnetometer as a class project in 1965. He later spent two sabbatical years as a senior visiting fellow at the Oxford Laboratory and as a Royal Society (Great Britain) Anglo-Australasian Visiting Fellow, in 1976 and 1983. He organised the first Archaeometry Conference outside the United Kingdom in 1980 in Christchurch. His first hand experience with the scientific facilities relating to archaeology at both Oxford and Bradford Universities persuaded him that something needed to be done to take the existing archaeological facilities in New Zealand out of the Stone Age. As a result, one of Leach's most notable, and perhaps now least recognised, contribution to archaeology was his development of the archaeological laboratories at Otago University. In 1968, an old army shed served the archaeologists as a laboratory. After moving to progressively larger buildings in 1972 and 1973, the archaeologists were finally allocated adequate space in the new building that was then to be called the Hocken Building. Leach helped develop the plan for the then state-of-the-art laboratories, including proper facilities for obtaining and displaying a comparative osteological collection, an archaeological conservation facility, and finally a laboratory devoted to archaeometry.

This greatly expanded the opportunities for senior archaeology students to do MA thesis research based on more than visits to the library and minor projects of fieldwork. Provision was made in the new laboratory complex for student projects in archaeological remote sensing, transmission tube XRF analysis, radioactive source excitation XRF, and thermoluminescence analysis. Leach formed strong links with various external laboratories, which enabled students to take advantage of scientific facilities at the then Institute of Nuclear Sciences accelerator group, the Otago Department of Chemistry facility for Electron paramagnetic resonance (ESR), and the Lucas Heights Nuclear Physics Laboratory. He encouraged his students to publish their archaeometry projects, often jointly with the senior scientists whose external facilities were being used. Student projects that survived the rigours of publishing covered a wide range of topics from accelerator depth profile dating of bones and teeth, seasonal dating of shells using oxygen isotopes, experimental archaeology, thermoluminescence dating of oven stones, physical analysis of pottery, trace element analysis of obsidian sources with XRF, dating of human bone with ESR, and diet reconstruction from atomic absorption spectroscopy of human bone.

== Research ==
=== Archaeological fieldwork ===
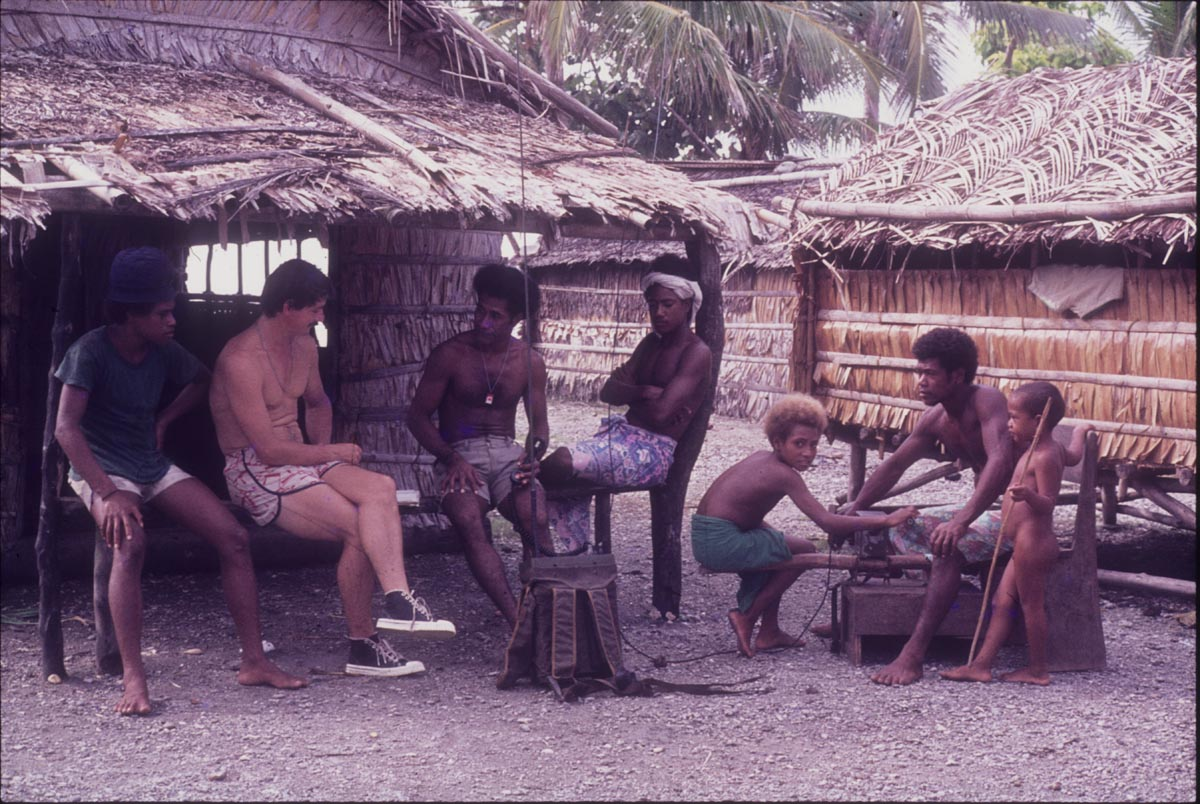
Leach ordering medical supplies by radio, Taumako, 1978

Leach has had a strong commitment to "area excavation", in the belief that the reconstruction of prehistory is best approached by first understanding the patterns of human culture in the synchronic dimension before turning attention to diachronic studies. This commitment partly arose from a then current practice of advance-face excavation in southern New Zealand, which he regarded as unduly destructive, and also the widespread use of exploratory test pit excavations through the Pacific and elsewhere. He had great admiration for André Leroi-Gourhan's area excavations at the Magdalenian hunters' site of Pincevent. This was to be the theoretical theme of his PhD dissertation, in which he proposed that a single human community could be used as a useful archaeological construct when building prehistory from archaeological excavations.

His first excavation, jointly with his first wife Helen Leach, was at Oturehua in 1967. This was a stone tool quarry in Central Otago. The location of every stone flake was recorded in the 10x10m excavated area and they were later laid out in their original locations on a gridded floor in a laboratory. Cellulose glue was used to re-assemble flakes back on to their original cores to study the flaking process relating to prismatic core blade production.

His was the inspiration for the three-year (1969–1972) research programme in Palliser Bay, southern Wairarapa, which he initiated and, with his wife Helen, directed. This resulted in two PhD theses (his own and Helen's), five Master's theses, four of which he supervised and a monograph summarising the results, to which all the thesis students contributed. He has always been interested in seeking to understand prehistoric communities as an operational archaeological unit, and this was reflected in his work in Palliser Bay. He then planned and launched a similar research programme in the Chatham Islands 1974–1975, which was carried on by his student Doug Sutton.

The fieldwork in Palliser Bay involved close consultation with the local Maori of Ngati Hinewaka, with whom Leach has continued to maintain close connections. He was involved in their Waitangi Tribunal claim as a member of their Claims Committee and author of a major report on fishing rights. He had previously been instrumental in helping them secure the return of the land and associated buildings at Cape Palliser Lighthouse.

From the mid-1970s, Leach's fieldwork took him beyond New Zealand. He participated in two archaeological surveys with Jim Specht for the Australian Museum, on Norfolk Island in 1976, and in the Kandrian district of Southwest New Britain, Papua New Guinea in 1979.

In 1977–1978 he carried out archaeological research on a Polynesian outlier in the Outer Eastern Solomon Islands with Janet Davidson, with a thorough survey and two major excavations in Taumako. A rock shelter, Te Ana Tavatava, provided the basis for a cultural sequence of nearly 3000 years for Taumako, while the Namu burial mound provided a wealth of material culture from the last millennium. With the full agreement of the Taumako people, the human remains were taken to New Zealand for specialist study and much has been learned about individual life histories, diet, health and disease. The remains have since been repatriated to Solomon Islands.

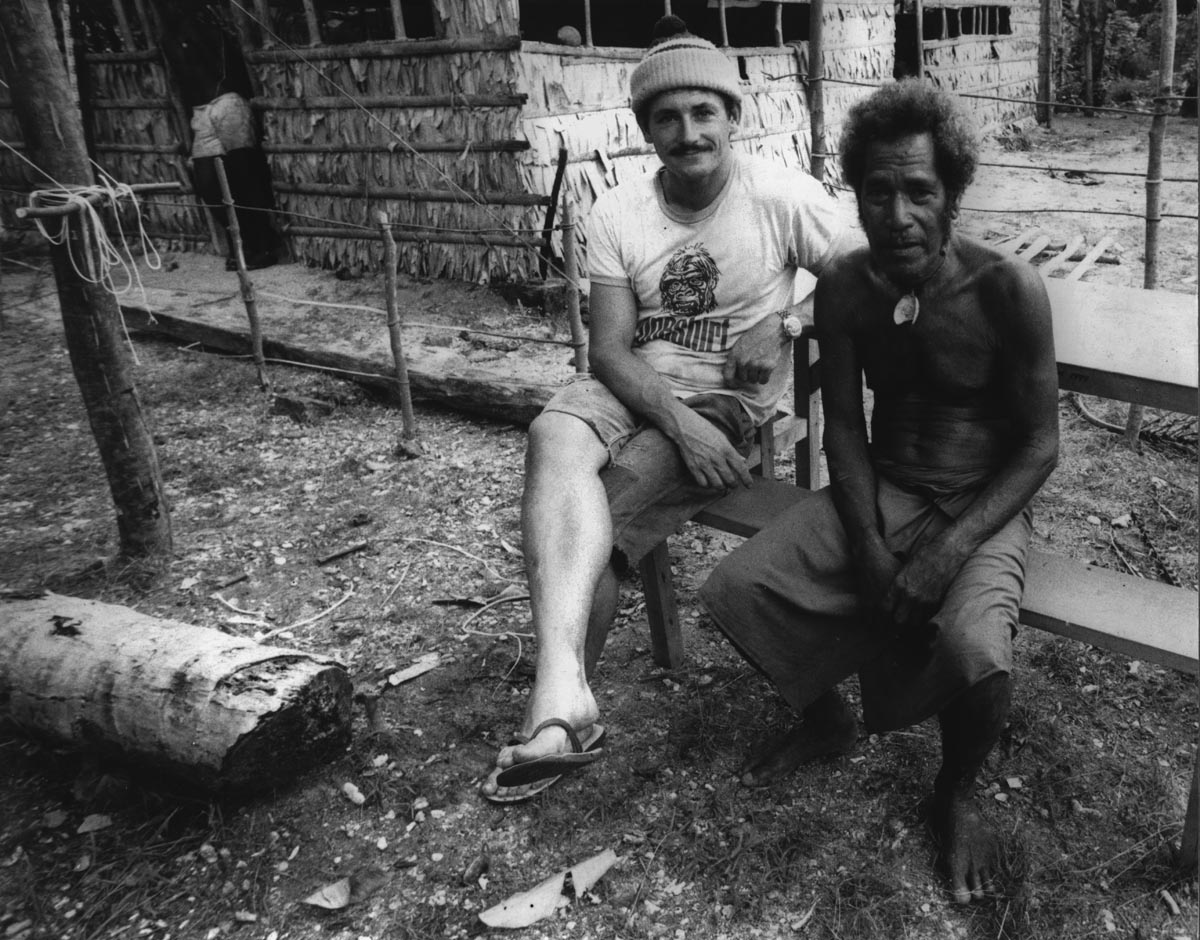
Leach and Wilson. School in the background was renamed Foss Primary School

The Taumako project was soon followed by survey and excavations on Kapingamarangi atoll in the Federated States of Micronesia with Graeme Ward. Leach then assisted one of his PhD students with excavations in the Yap islands in Micronesia in 1983. He carried out a thorough archaeological survey of the island of Singapore for the National Museum of Singapore in 1987, and assisted Shizuo Oda in an archaeological survey of the Izu Islands and Bonin Islands(Ogasawara Islands), between Japan and the Mariana Islands in 1989.

In his Pacific fieldwork, as in New Zealand, Leach has lived up to his conviction that fieldwork should always be published in full. His commitment to publication led him to take on the position of business manager and de facto production manager of the New Zealand Journal of Archaeology for the 30 years of its existence, from 1979 to 2008.

=== Other research ===
Fieldwork was only part of Leach's contribution to archaeology. He has always approached the study of prehistoric communities from a strongly scientific perspective, which led him to explore methods for the identification of faunal remains and the sourcing and dating of lithic materials. He built a comparative faunal collection, particularly of fish remains, at Otago University and his methodology for fish identification is still widely followed in New Zealand and the Pacific. He has published extensively on various aspects of obsidian in archaeology, not only on source characterisation and artefact identification, but also on basic properties, such as thermoluminescence, radioactive emissions, fission track dating, and advanced mathematical methods of matching artefacts to their source. Another of his special research interests is the reconstruction of ancient diet from bone isotope chemistry, and he developed a simulation model which is now used for more accurate dating of human bone by adjusting for the sources of carbon in diet.

=== Research after "retirement" ===
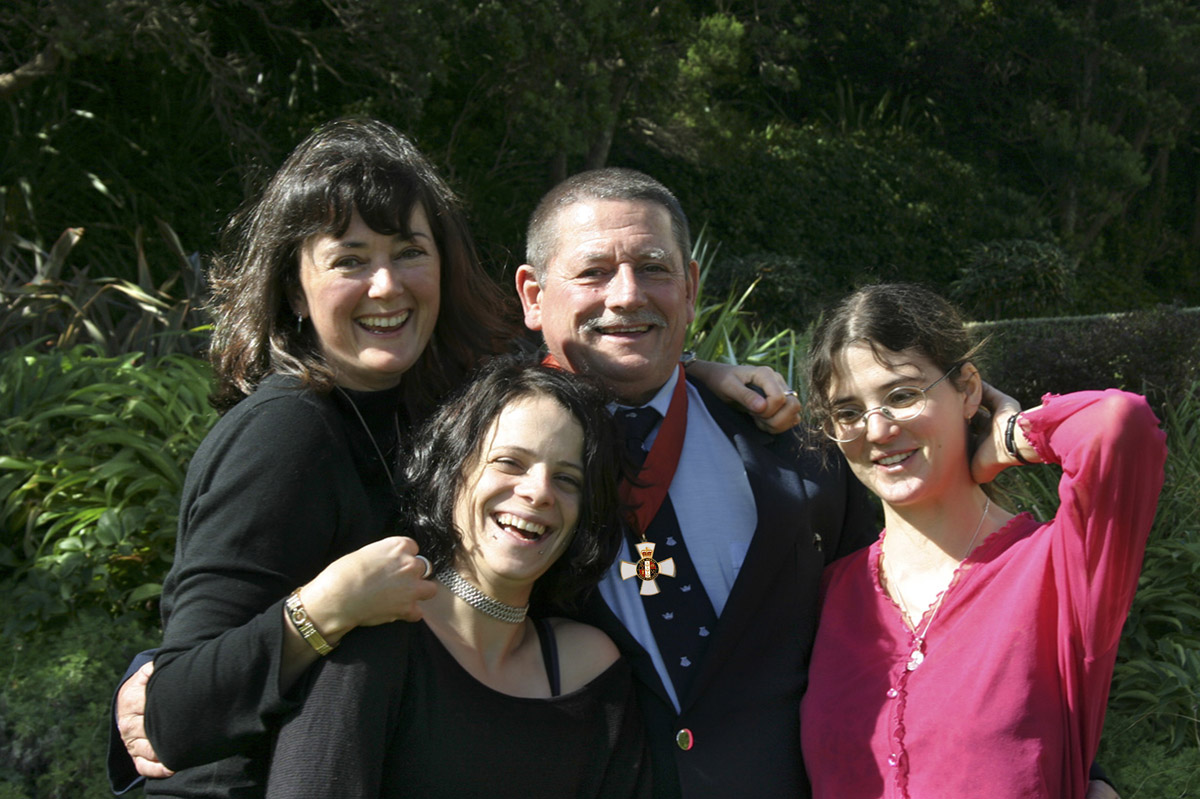
Leach with his three daughters, after his investiture as a Companion of the New Zealand Order of Merit in December 2004

The final stage of Leach's professional career was spent at The Museum of New Zealand Te Papa Tongarewa after he retired from university teaching. In 1988, the director John Yaldwyn encouraged Leach to join the museum as an honorary curator and establish a specialised laboratory for archaeozoology. This was a bold move at a time when archaeologists struggled to find places for long term storage of excavated faunal material, which could be used for advanced research in later years. Although the long term research potential of archaeofauna was widely recognised, museums were extremely reluctant to accept large collections of bones, shell and soil residues. The Archaeozoology Laboratory was founded to take care of such material. Leach set about building new comparative osteological and shell collections, and cataloguing a large body of existing archaeological faunal collections. He brought research funds into the museum and employed a small staff doing advanced research on the collections and publishing the results. This led to an avalanche of scientific papers and several books over the next 15 years on New Zealand and the tropical Pacific.

During this period at Te Papa he also ran a consultancy and undertook investigations into aspects of Waitangi Tribunal claims for the Crown Law Office and Maori iwi organisations. He contributed expert evidence on four separate claims before the Waitangi Tribunal between 1989 and 2003: the Ngāi Tahu claim, Muriwhenua, Te Roroa, and Ngati Hinewaka.

Leach retired for a second time in 2002. He began attending night classes in electronics to obtain an amateur radio licence (ZL2JKP) and has since earned the DXCC award from the American Amateur Radio League. For a time he ran a private radio station for the benefit of residents of Ngākuta Bay in the Marlborough Sounds. He continues to write and publish, but at a greatly reduced rate.

== Recognition and honours ==
In 1978, Leach was awarded the Percy Smith Medal by the University of Otago in honour of his contribution to anthropology.

In 1989, eighteen of his former graduate students contributed to a festschrift in his honour entitled "Saying So Doesn't Make It So", the title capturing a consistent demand he made of himself and his students for rigorous proof of any interpretations in archaeology.

In 1994 Leach was invested as a kaumātua of the Kohunui Marae, Pirinoa (Ngāti Kahungunu ki Wairarapa), a rare honour for a European.

In 2000, he was made an honorary life member of the New Zealand Archaeological Association.

In the 2005 New Year Honours, Leach was appointed a Companion of the New Zealand Order of Merit, for services to archaeology.

A school at Namu on Taumako island, was renamed the Foss Primary School in his honour.
