= Turbott =

Turbott is a surname. Notable people with the surname include:

- Evan Graham Turbott (born 1914), New Zealand zoologist
- Ian Turbott (1922–), New Zealand-born British colonial governor and Australian university chancellor
- Harold Bertram Turbott (1899–1988), New Zealand doctor, broadcaster and writer
- Harry Turbott (1930 – 2016), a New Zealand architect and landscape architect
