= Lawrence Stevens =

Lawrence Stevens may refer to:

- Lawrence Stevens (boxer), South African boxer
- Lawrence Tenney Stevens, American sculptor
- Lawrence Sterne Stevens, American pulp fantasy and science fiction illustrator

== See also ==
- Laurence Stevens, British graphic designer
- Laurie Stevens, New Zealand accountant and industrialist
- Larry Stevens, American football player
