= 1983 Birthday Honours (New Zealand) =

Awards list for New Zealand

The 1983 Queen's Birthday Honours in New Zealand, celebrating the official birthday of Elizabeth II, were appointments made by the Queen in her right as Queen of New Zealand, on the advice of the New Zealand government, to various orders and honours to reward and highlight good works by New Zealanders. They were announced on 11 June 1983.

The recipients of honours are displayed here as they were styled before their new honour.

== Knight Bachelor ==
- John Dean Goffin – of Wellington; commissioner and territorial commander of the Salvation Army in New Zealand.
- John Mowbray – of Wellington. For services to banking, commerce and the community.
- Laurence Houghton Stevens CBE – of Auckland. For services to the textile industry and export.

== Order of Saint Michael and Saint George ==
=== Knight Commander (KCMG) ===
- The Right Honourable Wallace Edward Rowling MP – of Richmond; Prime Minister of New Zealand, 1974–1975, and lately Leader of the Opposition.
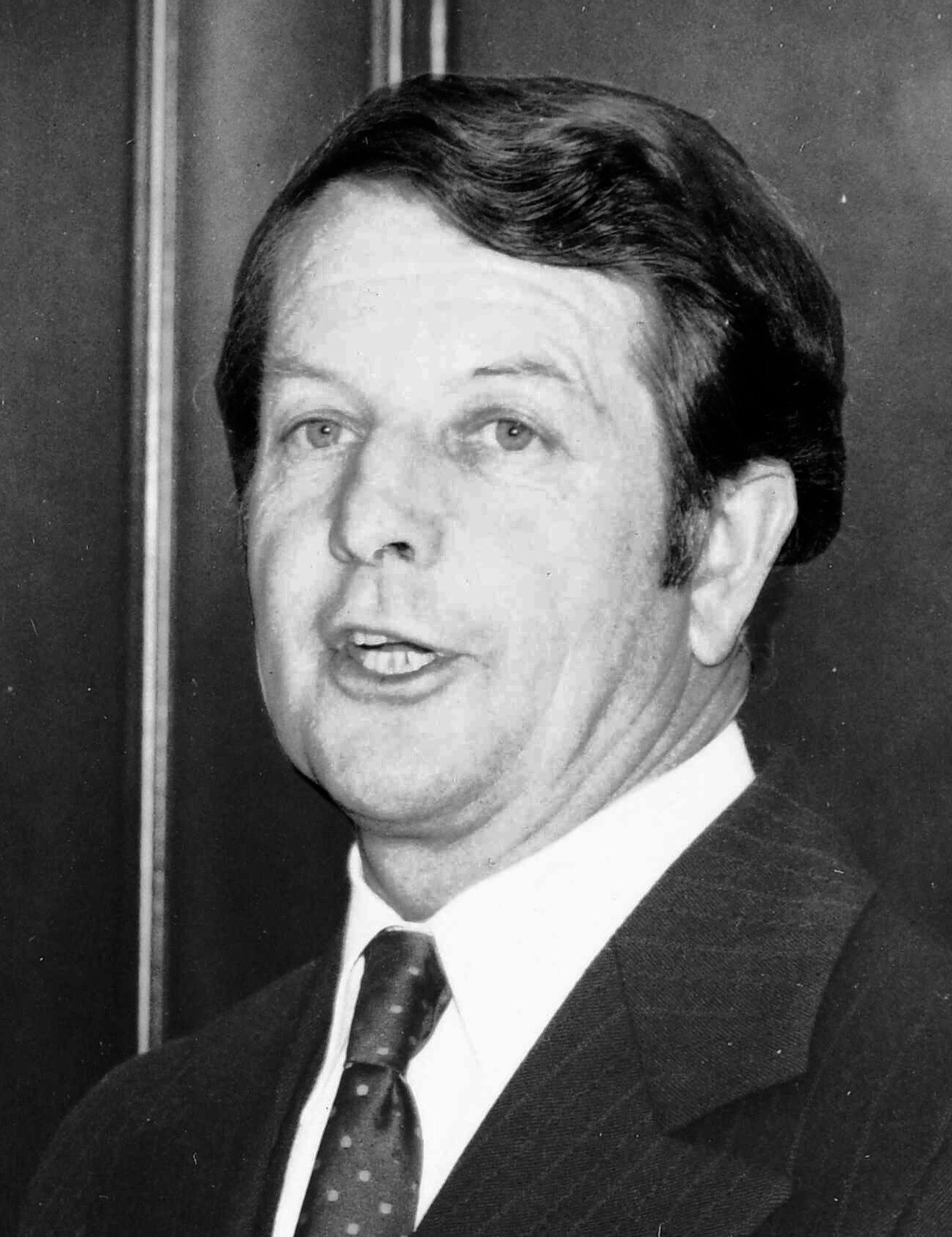
Sir Wallace Rowling

=== Companion (CMG) ===
- Dr Herbert John Hall Hiddlestone – of Wellington; lately Director-General of Health, Department of Health.
- Dr David Kear FRSNZ – of Lower Hutt; Director-General of the Department of Scientific and Industrial Research.
- Paul Loxton Molineaux – of Wellington; lately director, New Zealand Security Intelligence Service.
- Robert Josiah Walton OBE QPM ED – Commissioner, New Zealand Police.
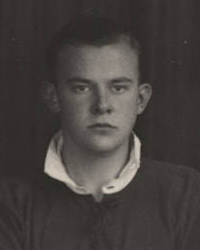
John Hiddlestone

== Order of the British Empire ==
=== Commander (CBE) ===
Civil division

- Nene Janet Paterson Clutha (Janet Frame) – of Wanganui. For services to literature.
- Robert Donald Cox OBE – of Auckland; chairman, Tourist Hotel Corporation.
- Professor Graham Collingwood Liggins FRS FRSNZ – of Auckland. For services to medical research.
- Lee Isbister Murdoch – of Papatoetoe. For services to the Auckland Regional Authority and the community.
- Professor Keith Sinclair – of Auckland. For services to literature.
- Dr Newton Ernest Wickham – of Auckland. For services to dentistry.
- Judge Walter Max Willis – of Wellington. For services as a District Court judge.

Military division

- Brigadier Brian Thomas McMahon QHP – Brigadiers' List, New Zealand Army.
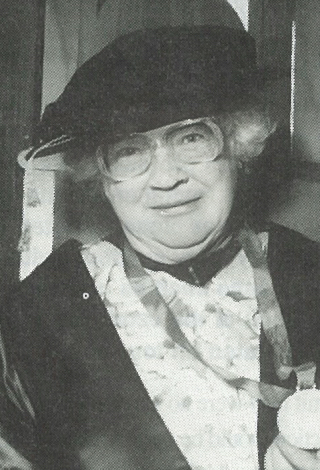
Janet Frame

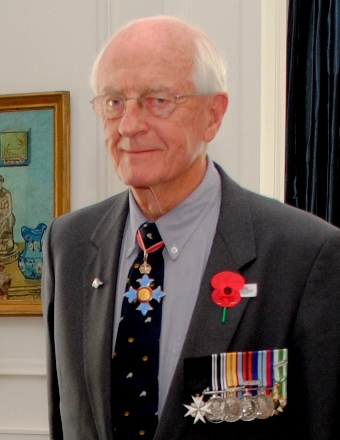
Brian McMahon

=== Officer (OBE) ===
Civil division

- Malcolm Thomas Churches – deputy assistant commissioner, New Zealand Police.
- Alfred Eric Edward Clark JP – of Auckland; principal, Rutherford High School, since 1960.
- John Clark JP – of Invercargill. For services to local and community affairs.
- Arnold Thomas Clements – of Matamata. For services to returned servicemen and the community.
- Charles Frederick Collins – of Christchurch. For services to cricket.
- Morton William Coutts – of Auckland. For services to the brewing industry.
- Reginald Clifford Dunlop JP – of Pukekohe. For services to farming and the community.
- John Douglas Gerard – of Whangārei. For services to the legal profession and the arts.
- Dr Erin Michael George Griffin – of Wellington. For services as a general practitioner and to the community.
- The Reverend Dr Adam Maitland Lang MacFarlan MC – of Auckland. For services to education and the community.
- Ronald George McGregor JP – of Auckland. For services to rugby league and the community.
- Guy Ngan – of Lower Hutt. For services to the arts.
- Frances Kathleen Louisa Orton JP – of Christchurch. For services to the community.
- David Ian Pezaro JP – of Auckland. For services to the community.
- Denis Bernard Saunders JP – of Whangārei. For services to the community.
- Peter Joseph Smith – of Eltham. For services to the Taranaki Hospital Board and the community.
- Robert Keith Somerville – of Kamo. For services to agriculture.
- Ralph Gilbert Winwood – of Gore. For services to local government.

Military division

- Captain John Anthony Botfield Lewis – Royal New Zealand Navy.
- Colonel Owen Edward Mann – Colonels' List, New Zealand Army.
- Group Captain Colin William Rudd AFC – Royal New Zealand Air Force.

=== Member (MBE) ===
Civil division

- Hilda Bessie Allen – of Gisborne. For services to nursing and the community.
- Frank Albert Brittain – of Palmerston North. For services to aviation.
- Brian Henry Bull – of Gisborne. For services to education and the community.
- Thomas Reynolds Clarkson – of Wellington. For services to amateur radio.
- Henry Reginald Clay – of Auckland. For services to handicapped children.
- Russell Thomas Davis – of Ōtorohanga. For services to farming and the community.
- Thomas Langley Hall – of Wellington; lately assistant director (production), Dairy Division, Ministry of Agriculture and Fisheries.
- Mona Hinemoa Hood – of Queenstown. For services to the community.
- David Allen Low JP – of Hāwera. For services to the community.
- Cecily Margaret Maccoll – of Christchurch. For services to the Save the Children Fund.
- William Noel Mackie – of Auckland. For services to horse racing.
- Peter Wilson Maplesden – of Nelson; conservator of forests, New Zealand Forest Service, Nelson, 1960–1982.
- Jean Halliday Moore – of Dunedin. For services to lifesaving and the community.
- Eugene Denis Morgan – of Tauranga. For services to the Māori people and the community.
- Alvyn Arthur Pennington – of Raumati Beach. For services to cycle racing.
- Ronald Thomas Small – of Lake Tekapo. For services to search and rescue operations.
- Louis Desmond Smith – of Tūrangi. For services to the community.
- John Joseph Stewart – of Bulls; principal, Flock House Farm Training Institute.
- George Maling Townshend JP – of Napier. For services to the community.
- Elma Frances Turner – of Nelson. For services to the community.
- Lionel Allan Cromwell Warner – of Auckland. For services to astronomy.
- Colin Michael White JP – of Whakatāne. For services to the community.
- Bryan George Williams – of Auckland. For services to rugby.
- Ivan George Wilson – of Napier. For services to surf lifesaving and social welfare.

Military division

- Lieutenant Gary Clarke Collier – Royal New Zealand Navy.
- Warrant Officer Stores Assistant Anthony Carl Fraser – Royal New Zealand Navy.
- Lieutenant Commander Clifton John Olliver VRD – Royal New Zealand Naval Volunteer Reserve.
- Captain (Temporary Major) Christopher John Hardley – Royal Regiment of New Zealand Artillery (Territorial Force).
- Warrant Officer Class II (now Warrant Officer Class I) Stephen George Lineham – Royal New Zealand Electrical and Mechanical Engineers.
- Major and Quartermaster Edward Vennel Sweet – Royal New Zealand Army Ordnance Corps.
- Flight Lieutenant Arthur Warren Dale – Royal New Zealand Air Force.
- Warrant Officer Howard John Henry Hamley – Royal New Zealand Air Force.
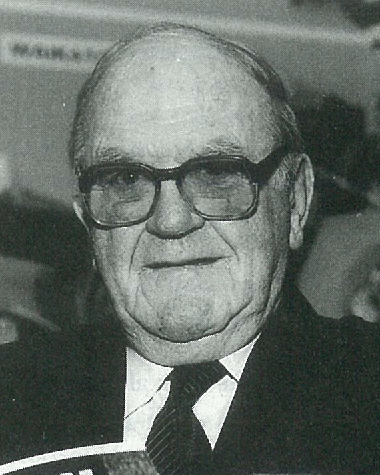
JJ Stewart

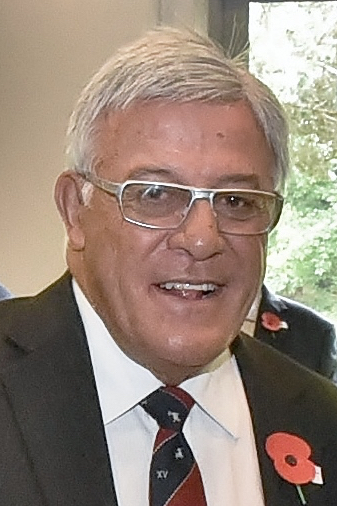
Bryan Williams

== British Empire Medal (BEM) ==
Military division

- General Service Hand Akunata Pateriki Kereti – Royal New Zealand Navy.
- Petty Officer Writer Carrie Annette Watarawi – Royal New Zealand Navy.
- Staff Sergeant July Ben Heteraka – Royal New Zealand Infantry Regiment.
- Staff Sergeant Allen Godfrey Owens – Royal New Zealand Electrical and Mechanical Engineers.
- Sergeant Matenga Roiri – Royal New Zealand Infantry Regiment (Territorial Force).
- Signalman (W) Rose Marie Hariata Savage – Royal New Zealand Corps of Signals.
- Flight Sergeant Duncan Donald McMahon – Royal New Zealand Air Force.

== Companion of the Queen's Service Order (QSO) ==
=== For community service ===
- Bernard Bookman – of Auckland.
- Philippa Marjorie Corkill – of Wellington.
- Poul Rudolph Gnatt – of Oslo, Norway.
- Manuele Palehau Leone – of Nukunonu, Tokelau.
- Group Captain Thomas Alexander McLeod Morgan AFC – of Wellington; Royal New Zealand Air Force (Retired).
- Hare Reihana – of Kawakawa.
- Bruce Young – of Wellington.

=== For public services ===
- William Stewart Aitken JP – of Geraldine.
- Dr Neil Albert Algar – of Matamata; mayor of Matamata.
- Brian Harrison Burton – of Hamilton.
- Henry William Joseph Fox – of Christchurch; chairman, radiotherapy and oncology services, North Canterbury Hospital Board, since 1977.
- Helen Lavinia Garrett – of Christchurch.
- Joan Grace Eveline Kerr – of Wellington; lately chairman, Queen Elizabeth II Arts Council.
- Charles Laurence Rau – of Gisborne.
- Archie Dick Wilson – of Waitara; mayor of Waitara.

== Queen's Service Medal (QSM) ==
=== For community service ===
- Isabella Martha Adams – of Dargaville.
- Christabella May Alley – of Gisborne.
- James Purcell Atkinson – of Hokitika.
- Barbara Jean Blackie – of Christchurch.
- Rex William Boniface – of Invercargill.
- Isabella Jane Bryant – of Hamilton.
- Alice Jean Buchanan – of Waipukurau.
- George Gardiner Cochran – of Winton.
- Gilbert Francis Cornwall – of Auckland.
- Percy Henry Crough – of Hokitika.
- Winnie Marion Draper – of Martinborough.
- Henry Richard Evans – of Wellington.
- James Gardiner – of Matamata.
- Maud Hall – of Hastings.
- Doreen Lucy Humphries – of Edendale.
- Helen Alice McKenzie – of Upper Hutt.
- Thomas Patrick Martin – of Wairoa.
- Hilda Emily Osborne – of Wanganui.
- Reginald David Pool – of Auckland.
- Edna Martha Prescott – of Auckland.
- Lettice Mary Schmidt – of Wanganui.
- Emily Rangitiaria Schuster – of Whakarewarewa.
- Ngaire Enid Stewart (Ngaire Lovie) – of Auckland.
- Vera Eileen Stokes – of Auckland.
- Ian Renton Tailby – of Kaitaia.

=== For public services ===
- Douglas Campbell JP – of Thames; chief executive, Thames Hospital Board, 1972–1982.
- Katherine Anne Craig – of Roxburgh.
- Kathleen Isa Craig – of Wellington.
- Peggie Dalmer – of Christchurch.
- William Henry Ellingham – of Hāwera.
- Leslie Walter George – of Lower Hutt; lately manager, production planning and programming, Government Printing Office.
- Beryl Lilian Dolman Harris – of Rotorua.
- Alison Margaret Holst – of Wellington.
- Frank Stuart Hurley – of Auckland; lately deputy superintendent, Mount Eden Prison, New Zealand Prison Service.
- David Martin Lye – senior constable, New Zealand Police.
- Edward Ronald Menzies JP – of Trentham.
- Millicent Amelia Moulden JP – of Te Teko.
- Kenneth Gordon Skudder JP – of Hikurangi.
- Victor Raymond Story – sergeant, New Zealand Police.
- Tome Kite Moana Walker JP – of Te Kaha.
- Norman Henry Whatman – of Palmerston North.
- Valerie Bruce Wilkens – of Nelson.
- Eric James Wilkes JP – of Picton.
- Ian David Williams – of Bluff; lately master, Government vessel Wairua, Ministry of Transport.

== Queen's Fire Service Medal (QFSM) ==
- Roy Harwood Billing – senior station officer, Whitianga Volunteer Fire Brigade, New Zealand Fire Service.
- George Chan – chief fire officer, Raetihi Volunteer Fire Brigade, New Zealand Fire Service.
- Stuart Withiel Thomas – fire commander, National Headquarters, New Zealand Fire Service.

== Queen's Police Medal (QPM) ==
- Walter Kevin Egan – chief inspector, New Zealand Police.

== Air Force Cross (AFC) ==
- Wing Commander Gordon Wilmot Ragg – Royal New Zealand Air Force.
