= Murder of Malachi Subecz =

2021 New Zealand murder

- Location: Te Puna, New Zealand
- Date: 12 November 2021 (murder)
- Attack type: Murder
- Weapon: Physical abuse
- Deaths: Malachi Subecz
- Assailant: Michaela Barriball
- Verdict: Guilty
- Convictions: Murder, ill treatment of a child, injuring with intent to injure
- Convicted: 1

Malachi Rain Subecz was a five-year old child who was violently abused and murdered by his caregiver Michaela Barriball in Te Puna, New Zealand, in November 2021. Barriball pleaded guilty to ill-treating a child and murder and was sentenced to at least 17 years imprisonment. Barriball's sister Sharon was also convicted of concealing evidence and sentenced to six months home detention. Subecz's murder attracted media coverage in New Zealand and led to two highly critical reviews of Oranga Tamariki (Ministry for Children), the government department responsible for the well-being of children.

Following Subecz's case, the New Zealand Government adopted several recommendations aimed at detecting child abuse but declined to institute mandatory reporting. In addition, three senior Oranga Tamariki staff working on Subecz's case were dismissed while the early childhood centre that he attended was stripped of its license.

== Abuse and death ==
In June 2021, Malachi Subecz's biological mother Jasmine Cotter was imprisoned on drug charges. At the request of Cotter, Subecz was placed in the care of Michaela Barriball in September 2021. Barriball, who was unemployed, lived in a rented cabin on a section owned by her father Chris Barriball in Te Puna, near Tauranga. According to Stuff, Barriball also owned a horticultural labour supply company called "Hunter & Kayla," which was registered to her then-address. Tommy Kapai, the director of the Tauranga social agency Te Tuinga Whānau, claimed that Barriball received significant funds from several agencies including Oranga Tamariki (Ministry for Children) to look after Subecz.

While in Barriball's custody, Subecz was assaulted on a daily basis including striking him in the head, face, and body. When Subecz soiled himself, Barriball would punish him by stripping him naked and locking him outside or in a car. In one incident, Barriball grabbed Subecz by his hair and hit his head against a wall twice. In a second incident, Barriball held Subecz underwater while he was bathing.

Staff at Abbey's Place Childcare Centre, the Tauranga-based daycare centre that Subecz attended, eventually noticed significant injuries including blunt-force trauma injuries to his head, large swelling, a black eye. When questioned by staff, Barriball claimed that Subecz had fallen off a bike. When the daycare staff tended to his injuries, Subecz told them that Barriball would be angry if she knew that he was receiving first-aid treatment. According to Stuff, Abbey's Place staff members also asked Barriball about the suspected abuse, violating the daycare centre's own policy not to alert the caregiver if ill-treatment of a child is suspected. Despite photographing his injuries, Abbey's Place failed to report Subecz's injuries to the authorities.

About 20 days later, Barriball placed Subecz in a shower flowing with water that was 73 degrees Celsius as punishment for soiling himself. As a result, the boy sustained severe burns including a deep 13cm blackened injury on his abdomen. Barriball considered taking Subecz to the hospital but decided against it due to her fear of her abuse being discovered. Five days after the shower incident, Barriball brought Subecz to a family gathering at a Mount Maunganui restaurant. When relatives questioned her about Subecz's injuries, she lied that the boy had accidentally suffered burns in the shower and that she had taken Subecz to see a doctor.

In addition to these assaults, Barriball also forced Subecz to stand for extended long periods and deprived him of food. Throughout October 2021, she also left Subecz home alone for extended periods, returning in the morning. She also made several text messages to her partner Guri Dhillon ("Hunter") expressing her disdain for the child and wanting to kill him. According to Stuff, both Barriball's father Chris and Dhillon were aware of Barriball's abusive treatment of Subecz but did not intervene or seek medical attention for the child.

While living with Barriball, Subecz kept in contact with his mother, who used her prison phone card that was paid for with wages that she earned inside prison. According to Stuff, Malachi's mother made at least 160 calls to Barriball so she could speak to Subecz. 44 of these calls were answered and Subecz spoke to his mother about 25 times. Due to COVID-19 pandemic lockdown restrictions at the time, Subecz was unable to visit his mother in prison.

On 1 November 2021, Barriball became upset after failing to find suitable accommodation for herself and Subecz. After being rebuffed by property managers, she lashed out and inflicted blunt force injuries on Subecz, causing him to suffer a seizure. After unsuccessfully attempting to revive Subecz, Michaela and Chris Barriball called an ambulance. She told paramedics that Subecz had fallen over while getting dressed for school. Due to his serious injuries including a brain haemorrhage and substantial bruises across his body, Subecz was admitted to Starship Hospital in Auckland where he was placed in an induced coma. He was extubated on 10 November and died from his injuries on 12 November. At the time of his death, he weighed 16 kilograms (35 pounds).

== Police investigation and legal proceedings ==
Following Subecz' hospitalisation, the New Zealand Police informed Barriball and her sister Sharon Barriball that they would be searching their property later that day. In an attempt to hide evidence, Sharon texted another person at the property and told her to hide Subecz's clothes. On 16 November 2021, Police found a suitcase with some of Subecz's clothes including a blood-stained set of green pyjamas.

In early May 2022, the Bay of Plenty Times reported that Barriball had pleaded guilty the previous week to a murder charge, two charges of ill-treating a child, and a single charge of injuring with intent to injure. In addition, Sharon pleaded guilty to a single charge of attempting to pervert the course of justice by removing evidence. The Crown also released the "Summary of Facts" detailing the abuse suffered by Subecz while in Barriball's care.

On 30 June 2022, Barriball was sentenced at the Rotorua High Court by Judge Paul Davidson to a minimum period of 17 years imprisonment. The Court also heard nine victim impact statements from several relatives of Subecz including his aunt Helen Menzies, her husband Peter Menzies, and their 15-year old daughter. Both the Crown prosecutor Anna Pollett and Barriball's defence lawyer Rachel Adams agreed that she should serve a sentence of life imprisonment, which carries a minimum period of imprisonment of 17 years. While Pollett favoured 18-19 years, Adams advocated for 17 years. In addition, Sharon was sentenced to six months home detention for attempting to pervert the course of justice.

== Responses ==
=== Subecz's family ===
Following the imprisonment of Subecz's mother Jasmine Cotter in June 2021, Cotter's niece Megan contacted Oranga Tamariki, Cotter's criminal lawyer, Cotter's family court lawyer, and Subecz's lawyer in an attempt to check on Subecz's well-being since her family was unaware of the child's whereabouts. In addition, Megan approached local police and Subecz's daycare centre. She subsequently obtained a photograph of Subecz from Barriball under the pretext of checking the results of recent eye surgery. Since the photo appeared to show bruising on Subecz, she sent the photograph to Oranga Tamariki but the social workers who examined it rejected her concerns of child abuse. Megan subsequently found a lawyer who helped her apply for custody of Subecz. The Family Court hearing was originally scheduled for 1 November 2021 but was delayed after Barriball claimed to have COVID-19 symptoms. On 2 November, Megan learnt that Malachi had been admitted to Starship Hospital with traumatic brain injuries. Megan's father Shane subsequently appealed for the Office of the Ombudsman to conduct an urgent independent investigation into Subecz's case.

Subecz's relatives including his aunt Helen Menzies criticised Oranga Tamariki's handling of Subecz's case, stating that his death was preventable and that Oranga Tamariki had failed him.

In December 2022, Subecz's mother issued a statement following the release of Dame Karen Poutasi's report. She stated "do not trust anyone with your kids who aren't family. A harsh lesson I've learnt in the worst possible way."

=== Barriball's family ===
Barriball's father Chris stated that "he was not doing OK" since details of Subecz's case were first released to the media in May 2022. He also said that he was stigmatised by members of their community.

== Inquiries ==
=== Boshier's report ===
In early May 2022 Chappie Te Kani, the acting chief executive of Oranga Tamariki (Ministry for Children), the government department responsible for child welfare in New Zealand, commissioned an investigation into how their system failed Malachi Subecz. In addition, the Minister for Children Kelvin Davis confirmed that Oranga Tamariki had some involvement with Subecz's life.

In October 2022, the Chief Ombudsman Peter Boshier released a scathing report into Oranga Tamariki's handling of Subecz's case. He described the department's response as "a litany of failures" and criticised Oranga Tamariki for not prioritising Malachi's welfare. In mid October 2022, Oranga Tamariki acknowledged that it had failed to act on at least two reports by Malachi's stepfather and a Corrections Department probation officer expressing concerns about Malachi's wellbeing. Davis also confirmed that Oranga Tamariki accepted the findings of the Ombudsman's report but delayed taking further action until a review of the Oranga Tamariki child care system had been completed. In response, the Māori Party co-leader Debbie Ngarewa-Packer criticised Davis' decision to delay action, stating that "a delayed approach meant atrocities were likely continuing." Ngarewa-Packer advocated implementing mandatory reporting as an interim measure.

=== Poutasi's report ===
In early December 2022, a second independent report by former health official Dame Karen Poutasi into Oranga Tamariki and other agencies' handling of the Malachi case was released. In addition to Oranga Tamariki, her investigation examined the responses of other government departments and agencies including the Corrections Department, Ministry of Education, Ministry of Health, Ministry of Social Development, and the New Zealand Police. Poutasi criticised these organisations for ignoring people who raised concerns about Malachi's wellbeing and failing to report or act upon signs of abuse. Poutasi made 14 recommendations including requiring Oranga Tamariki to vet proposed carers in the event a solo parent is taken into custody and requiring professionals and services working with children to report suspected abuse to Oranga Tamariki.

Poutasi's report was welcomed by Malachi's parents as a vindication of their view that the child's death could have been prevented had Oranga Tamariki acted. Similar sentiments were expressed by Minister of Children Kelvin Davis. Stuff also reported that Oranga Tamariki's Tauranga office, which oversaw Subecz's case, experienced high workload pressures, a high number of unallocated cases, inadequate site capacity, and significant burnout and stress among staff members.

In early December 2022, Newshub reported that the Government had accepted 9 of Poutasi's 14 recommendations including comparing medical records to gain a full picture of a child's health and promoting regular public awareness campaigns dealing with child abuse. However, the Government stated that it would consider the five remaining recommendations including vetting the caregivers of imprisoned parents, regular follow-up checks and implementing the mandatory reporting of suspected abuses to Oranga Tamariki.

=== Independent Children Monitor's report ===
In early August 2024, the Independent Children's Monitor released a follow-up assessment to Poutasi's report. The assessment found that the child protection system had not improved since Subecz's death. Several contributing factors included limited staffing capability, limited resources and half of NGO reports not being followed upon.

=== Disciplinary actions ===
In July 2022, the Ministry of Education placed Abbey's Place Childcare Centre on a provisional license after identifying "procedural failures" in dealing with suspected abuse. This included breaching at least two licencing regulations by questioning Barriball about Subecz's injuries and failing to report his injuries to any relevant agencies. Following an investigation, the Ministry stripped Abbey's Place of its operating license in early October 2022 after finding that it failed to meet operating requirements including conducting an internal review into Subecz's case, ensuring that the centre manager understood their obligations around child safety, and staff and board members' lack of training on dealing with child abuse.

In December 2022, the Minister for Children Kelvin Davis confirmed that three of the senior staff working on Subecz's case were no longer working with the agency. Two of the individuals had resigned while a third had been dismissed.

=== 2025 coronial inquest ===
A coronial inquest into Subecz's death began on 14 July 2025 at the Coroners' Court in Auckland. Coroner Janet Anderson presided over the inquest. Subecz's mother Jasmine Cotter told the inquest that she had sent Subecz to live with Barriball instead of his biological family in Kapiti Coast because she feared she would never see him again. Cotter thought that if Subecz remained in Tauranga that he would be able to visit her in prison. She also told the inquest that she regretted missing warning signs about Subecz being abused during her son's phone calls to the prison. Due to concerns about her son's wellbeing, Cotter had asked Oranga Tamariki to investigate. The child protection department produced a favourable report of Barriball's care for Subecz without visiting her property. Cotter criticised Oranga Tamariki and Subecz's child care centre for failing to detect and report signs of child abuse.

That same day, the inquest also heard testimony from Detective Inspector Craig Rawlinson, who led the investigation into Subecz's murder. Rawlinson told the court that Subecz's biological family had immediately raised concerns with Police and Oranga Tamariki about his car arrangement following his mother's imprisonment in June 2021. However, Oranga Tamariki had not thoroughly investigated a report about the child's well being. Rawlinson told the inquiry that Barriball's guardianship of Subecz was motivated by welfare payments, state-supplied accommodation and her relationship with an Indian overstayer. She believed that being guardian to a dependent child would assist his residency application. Having guardianship over Subecz also gave Barriball leverage over Cotter, who was a witness in an ongoing criminal prosecution involving one of Barriball's relatives. Rawlinson outlined the abuses that Subecz suffered under Barriball's care. When questioned by Anderson, Rawlinson said that he supported making it a criminal offence not to report child abuse.

On 15 July, the coronial inquest heard from Starship children's hospital duty paediatrician Dr Patrick Kelly, who attended to Subecz when he was admitted on 1 November 2021. He disputed Barriball's claims that Subecz had sustained his injuries from falling down and instead testified that his injuries showed "evidence of a sustained period of cruelty" including bruises, grazes, burns and malnutrition. Kelly criticised Police and Oranga Tamariki for ignoring evidence of child abuse without getting input from health professionals. That same day, Subecz's cousin Megan Cotter testified about her family's efforts to rescue Subecz from Barriball.

On 17 July, the inquest heard testimony from the former manager of the Abbey's Place Daycare Centre, which Subecz attended prior to his dead. She told the inquest that she had no suspicion that Subecz was being abused and accepted Barriball's account that he sustained his bruises from falling off a bike. Subecz had told a staff member that he had not fallen off a bike and twice said Barriball was not going to be happy. The coronial inquest concluded on 25 July, with Coroner Anderson stating that she could not give a timeframe on when her findings and recommendations would be released.

On 11 February 2025, Coroner Anderson released the findings of her coronial inquiry, which concluded that authorities had missed opportunities to stop Subecz from being abused and killed during the last six months of his life. She agreed with the Children's Commissioner's evidence that his abused violated his rights as a child under the United Nations Convention on the Rights of the Child. The coroner welcomed the Government's moves to introduce mandatory reporting of child abuse and urged authorities to do more to identify and protect children of imprisoned sole caregivers.
