= 1979 New Year Honours (New Zealand) =

Annual awards for New Zealanders

The 1979 New Year Honours in New Zealand were appointments by Elizabeth II on the advice of the New Zealand government to various orders and honours to reward and highlight good works by New Zealanders. The awards celebrated the passing of 1978 and the beginning of 1979, and were announced on 30 December 1978.

The recipients of honours are displayed here as they were styled before their new honour.

== Knight Bachelor ==
- Joseph Holmes Miller OBE – of Wellington. For services to the Ross Dependency, conservation and surveying.
- Robertson Huntly Stewart CBE – of Christchurch. For services to manufacturing and community.
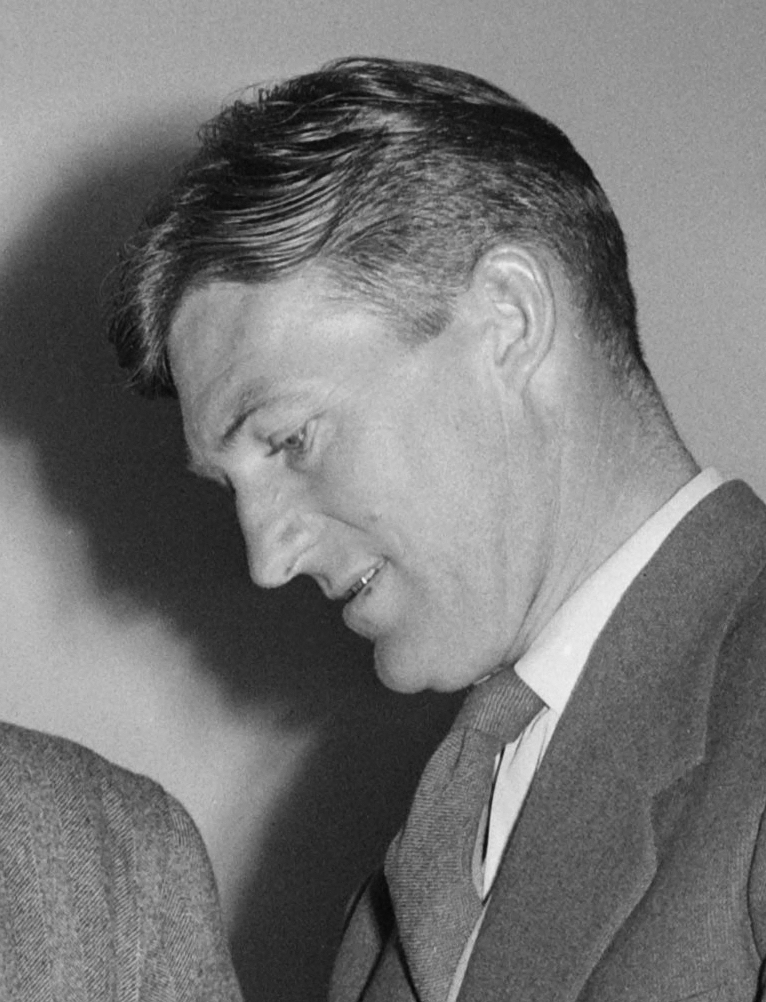
Sir Holmes Miller

== Order of Saint Michael and Saint George ==
=== Companion (CMG) ===
- Donald William Bain MBE – of Christchurch. For services to education.
- The Honourable John Raymond Mills – of Auckland. For services as a Crown solicitor.
- The Most Reverend John Hubert Macey Rodgers SM – of Papatoetoe. For services as Roman Catholic Bishop in Tonga and Cook Islands.
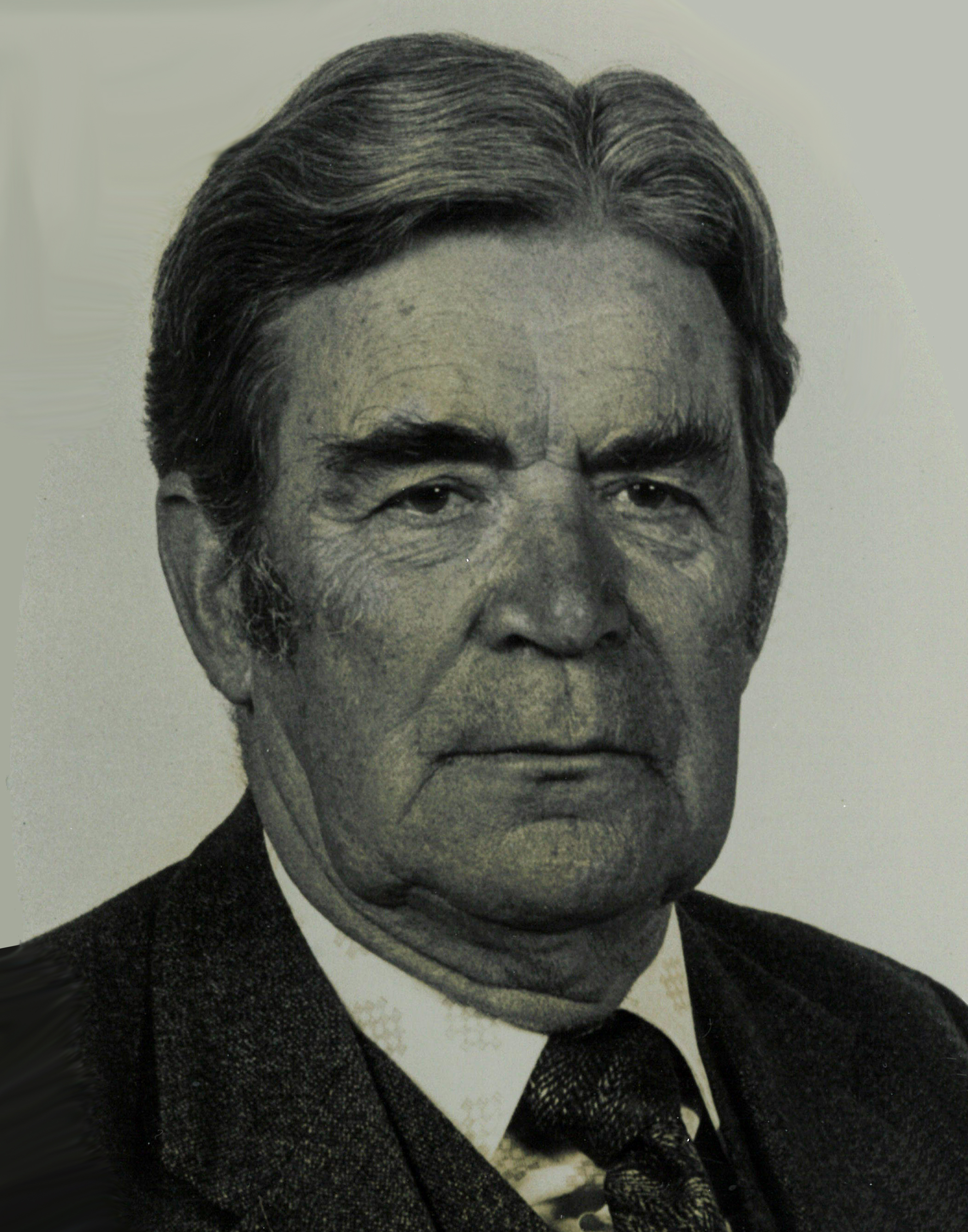
Donald Bain

== Order of the Bath ==
=== Companion (CB) ===
Military division

- Air Vice Marshal Cyril Laurence Siegert CBE MVO DFC AFC – Royal New Zealand Air Force.
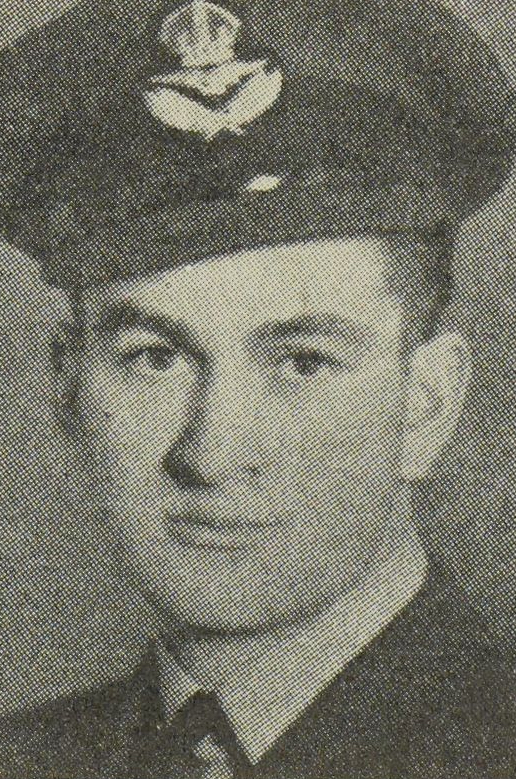
Larry Siegert

== Order of the British Empire ==
=== Knight Commander (KBE) ===
Civil division

- Mr Justice Gaven John Donne – Chief Justice of the High Court of the Cook Islands and Chief Justice of Niue.
- Hepi Hoani Te Heu Heu – of Taumarunui. For services to the Māori people and community.
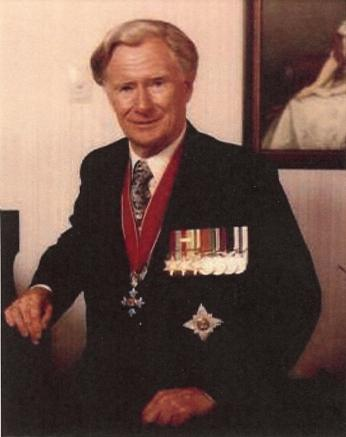
Sir Gaven Donne

=== Commander (CBE) ===
Civil division

- James Luke Hazlett – of Winton. For public services.
- Ernest Mervyn Hall Kemp MBE – of Wellington. For services to local government.
- Sidney Lewis Moses – of Wellington. For services to commerce and the community.
- James McLaren Ritchie – of Dunedin. For services to business, educational, charitable and Anglican Church affairs.
- Peter Jensen Reid Skellerup. For services to the City of Christchurch.
- Laurence Houghton Stevens – of Auckland. For services to the textile industry.

=== Officer (OBE) ===
Civil division

- Hardy Seymour Benton – of Kaponga. For services to the dairy industry.
- Alan Francis Brieseman – of Mosgiel. For services to the National Band of New Zealand.
- Henry Harford Buswell – chief executive, Auckland Hospital Board.
- Graeme Augustine Dallow – deputy assistant commissioner, New Zealand Police.
- Thomas Searle Ellingham – of Havelock North. For services to the farming industry.
- John Norman Stuart Flett – of Auckland. For services to bowling.
- Peter Townshend Gifford – of Hastings. For services to Birthright and the community.
- Dr Thomas Edwin Hall – of Christchurch; lately medical superintendent, Sunnyside Hospital.
- Dr Paul Peter Heller – of Auckland. For services to air and space law.
- Dr Dennis Douglas McCarthy – of Auckland. For services to medicine and the community.
- James Henry McKenzie – of Hamilton. For services to opera and the community.
- Robert Alexander Milne – of Christchurch. For services to hockey.
- John Edward Rowles – of Honolulu, Hawaii. For services to entertainment and New Zealand interests in the United States.
- Archibald James Scott – of Christchurch. For services to the community.
- Leonard Alfred Sisam – of Whakatāne. For services to farming, commerce and the community.
- Alan David Talbot – of South Canterbury. For services to local government.
- Sidney Ivan Wheatley – of Hamilton. For services to trade union and community affairs.
- William Sealy Wood – of Auckland. For services to medicine and the community.

Military division

- Commander Tom Alexander Riddell – Royal New Zealand Navy.
- Lieutenant Colonel Herbert Owen – Royal New Zealand Army Education Corps.
- Group Captain Bernard Joseph O'Connor AFC – Royal New Zealand Air Force.
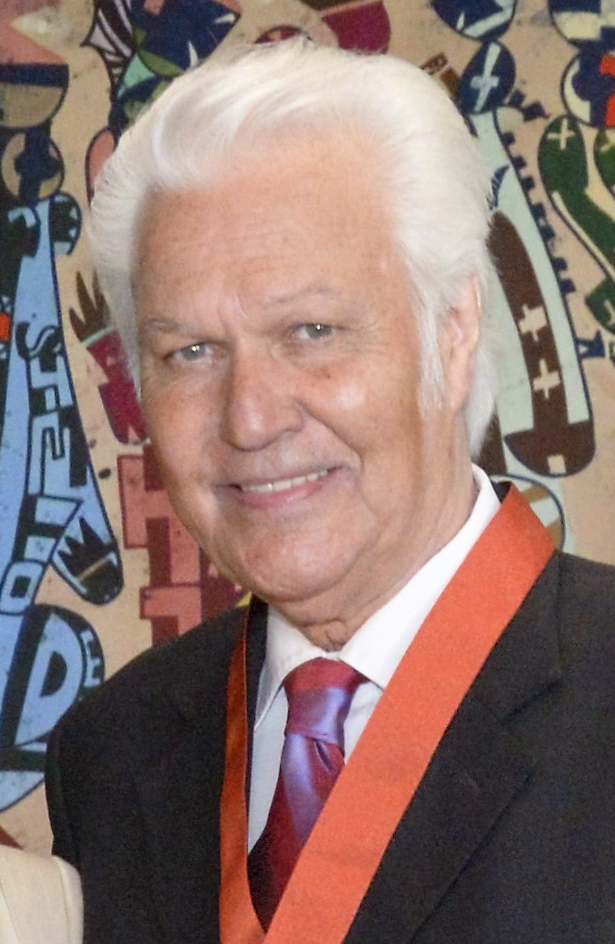
John Rowles

=== Member (MBE) ===
Civil division

- George Kent Armstrong DSO MC – of Queenstown. For services to the engineering profession.
- Eric Samuel Ayers JP – of Ashburton. For services to education.
- Russell William Bond – of Waikanae. For services to journalism and the arts.
- Cleland James Graham Brass JP – of Invercargill. For services to local-body and community affairs.
- John Reginald Burford – of Palmerston North. For services to exporting.
- Thelma Patricia Burton – of Lower Hutt. For services to nursing.
- Robert Tertius Douglas – of Wanganui; lately chief chemical inspector, Department of Health.
- James Geoffrey Furness MC – of Blenheim. For services to the community.
- Gwladys Louise Gardner – of Auckland; lately headmistress, Auckland Girls' Grammar School.
- Sholto Hamilton Georgeson – of Christchurch. For services to aeronautics.
- Grahame Frederick Glaister – of Auckland. For services to exporting.
- Ritchie Donald Massed – of Raumati Beach. For services to quarrying.
- Harold Ashworth Holmes JP – of Rotorua. For services to the community.
- Harry Tilson Kershaw – of Martinborough. For services to local-body and community affairs.
- Robert Hugh Wither Kirton – of Warkworth. For services to the dairy industry.
- John Harold Lucas – of Wellington. For services to scouting.
- James Edward Milner – of Christchurch. For services to paraplegics.
- Stanley Guy Russell JP – of Raglan. For services to the community.
- Maurice Barrington Smythe – of Waikanae. For services to racing.
- Lincoln Francis Warren – of Auckland. For services to rugby.
- Charles Edward Catlow Webb – of Levin. For services to the farming industry and the community.
- Max Phillip Whatman – of Christchurch. For services to journalism and the community.
- Elsie Hamer Wilkie – of Matamata. For services to bowling.
- Harold Robert Williams – of New Plymouth. For services to oil and gas exploration and development in New Zealand.

Military division

- Warrant Officer Seaman Bertram Kairo McLean – Royal New Zealand Navy.
- Lieutenant Commander Albert Francis Prendergast – Royal New Zealand Navy.
- Major Andrew Anderson – Royal New Zealand Engineers.
- Temporary Major James Taia – Royal New Zealand Infantry Regiment (Territorial Force).
- Warrant Officer Class 1 Lawrence Melville Taylor BEM – Royal New Zealand Infantry Regiment.
- Warrant Officer Francis Derek Bailey – Royal New Zealand Air Force.
- Squadron Leader Henry Cecil Richardson – Royal New Zealand Air Force.

== British Empire Medal (BEM) ==
Military division

- Chief Petty Officer Seaman Anthony David Long – Royal New Zealand Navy.
- Temporary Chief Petty Officer Seaman Eric Nicholson Vickers – Royal New Zealand Navy.
- Staff Sergeant William Joseph Donoghue – Royal New Zealand Army Service Corps.
- Temporary Sergeant Alan David Gundersen – Royal New Zealand Infantry Regiment.
- Staff Sergeant Ronald Hughes – Royal New Zealand Engineers.
- Temporary Warrant Officer Class 2 Brian Leslie Tolson – Royal New Zealand Signals.
- Flight Sergeant William Keith Abbott – Royal New Zealand Air Force.
- Sergeant Raymond Durroch Allan – Royal New Zealand Air Force.
- Flight Sergeant Roger Langley – Royal New Zealand Air Force.

== Companion of the Queen's Service Order (QSO) ==
=== For community service ===
- Joyce Doreen Flynn – of Wanganui.
- Eric Harold Grocott JP – of Long Bay, Coromandel.
- James Earl Hunt – of Palmerston North.
- Tumokai Katipa – of Ngāruawāhia.
- Olive Margaret McLeod Manning – of Auckland.

=== For public services ===
- Neville Robert Ainsworth – of Wellington; general manager, State Insurance Office.
- John Mokonuiarangi Bennett – of Havelock North; chairman, Māori Education Foundation.
- Edward George Buckton – of Lower Hutt; lately principal private secretary to the Prime Minister.
- Dr David Gordon Edgar – of Hamilton; lately director, Ruakura Animal Research Station, Ministry of Agriculture and Fisheries.
- Trevor Freeman Horne JP – of Nelson.
- Rex Thomas Morpeth JP – mayor of Whakatāne.
- Patrick George Sheehan JP – mayor of Devonport.
- Joseph Leslie Terry JP – of Pahiatua.

== Queen's Service Medal (QSM) ==
=== For community service ===
- Thomas Willie Abbott JP – of Papatoetoe.
- Margaret Brenda Dillon Bell – of Palmerston.
- The Reverend David Howard Vereker-Bindon (Brother David John SSF) – of Auckland.
- Joyce Winifred Brown – of Wellington.
- Stella Adelaide Brown – of Auckland.
- Sydney Charles Burton – of Auckland.
- Rachel Chisholm – of Blenheim.
- Maurice Walter Church – of Porirua East.
- Beatrice Mary Clifford – of Hamilton.
- Beatrice May Cousins – of Waitahuna.
- Mereana Kingi Davis – of Bay of Plenty.
- Louis Rodgers Fox – of Tītahi Bay.
- Cecil Henry Hilton – of Rotorua.
- Clifford Holdsworth – of Christchurch.
- Winifred Edith Georgina Knight – of Hāwera.
- William Morland Limpus JP – of Auckland.
- Joan Anita Little – of Tokoroa.
- Maisie McNair – of Christchurch.
- Clarice Mary May – of Winton.
- Nancy Elizabeth Money – of Auckland.
- Marjory Catherine Ogg – of Wanganui.
- John Edward Ord – of Taumarunui.
- Florence Gertrude Roberts – of Christchurch.
- Rosa Olga Sansom – of Gore.
- Elizabeth Mary Wheeler Shaw – of Ashburton.
- Ann Gladys Smith – of Dunedin.
- Jean Warren – of Christchurch.
- Evelyn Grace Williams JP – of Kaitaia.
- Margaret Mary Young – of Invercargill.

=== For public services ===
- Mary Armstrong – of Waimangaroa; postmistress, New Zealand Post Office.
- Herbert William Beasley – of Auckland.
- Stewart Dudley Belcher – senior sergeant, New Zealand Police.
- Lettice Marion Corsbie – of Northland.
- Cecil Charles Day – of Wanganui.
- Ronald Daniel Eastwood – of Te Aroha.
- Phoebe Mildred Frost – of Wellington.
- Charles Anthony Gallagher – of South Canterbury.
- James Benjamin Graham JP – of Christchurch.
- Henry Charles Hollander – constable, New Zealand Police.
- Eric William King – of Nelson.
- Lillia Mabel Langridge – of Ashburton.
- Leonard Joseph Lanigan JP – of Auckland.
- Allister Park McDonald – of Whakatāne.
- John William McIntosh JP – of Waiheke Island.
- Sheilagh Rosalee Maxwell – of Gisborne.
- Tui Alfreda Mayo – of Feilding.
- Kathleen Patricia Redmond – of Whangārei; chief nursing officer, Northland Hospital Board.
- Ole Ellegaard Sorenson – of Lower Hutt; lately assistant director (field operations), Ministry of Agriculture and Fisheries.
- Florence Alice Vincent JP – of Wellington.
- Fred John Williams – of Gisborne.
- Kira Williams JP – of Northland.
- Harold Alfred Lewis Wright – of Marton; lately head nurse, Maximum Security Unit, Lake Alice Hospital.

== Queen's Fire Service Medal (QFSM) ==
- William Clarkson – fire force commander, New Zealand Fire Service.
- William John Harrison – senior station officer, Invercargill Fire Brigade (Volunteer).
- Arthur William James Plummer – lately district officer, Sumner Volunteer Fire Brigade.
- Desmond Maurice Robertson – chief fire officer, Waihi Volunteer Fire Brigade.
- Peter Kenneth Burton-Wood – chief fire officer, director of Fire Safety Division, National Headquarters, New Zealand Fire Service.

== Queen's Police Medal (QPM) ==
- William Edward Hollinshead – chief superintendent, New Zealand Police.
- Robert Josiah Walton OBE ED – Commissioner of Police, New Zealand Police.

== Air Force Cross (AFC) ==
- Squadron Leader Graeme James Wharton Goldsmith – Royal New Zealand Air Force.
