= Olga Sansom =

Teacher, museum director, botanist, broadcaster, writer (1900-1989)

Olga Sansom QSM
- Born: Rosa Olga Jensen; 3 June 1900; Halfmoon Bay, Stewart Island, New Zealand
- Died: 1 July 1989 (aged 89); Lorneville, New Zealand
- Education: Southland Girls' High School
- Occupations: Teacher, museum director, botanist, broadcaster
- Spouses: Arthur Borne Vickery (m. 1921; died 1923) Norman Francis Sansom (m. 1924; died 1985)

Rosa Olga Sansom QSM (née Jensen; 3 June 1900 – 1 July 1989) was a New Zealand teacher, museum director, botanist, broadcaster and writer. She was a curator at Southland Museum and became the director of that museum in 1953. She was a founding member of the Ornithological Society of New Zealand. In 1979, she was awarded the Queens Service Medal.

== Early life and education ==
Sansom was born on at Halfmoon Bay, Stewart Island, New Zealand, in 1900. Her parents were Mary Elizabeth Leask and Newton Julius (Hans) Jensen, who was a fisherman and farmer. She was educated at Halfmoon Bay School, and then Southland Girls' High School, after which she was a probationary teacher at Waikiwi School in Invercargill. Sansom later taught at Longridge Village School and Menzies Ferry School.

== Museum and botanical work ==
Sansom became an honorary curator at the Southland Museum in June of 1948, having previously volunteered there. From March 1953 until 1959 she was director of the museum, making her New Zealand's first female museum director. As director, she was assisted by volunteers to develop displays on natural history, teach visiting school children, and identify biological specimens brought in by the public.

Sansom collected botanical specimens that included seaweeds, alpine and bog plants, lichens and ferns over the course of more than 50 years. In 1956 she was invited to give the Banks Lecture on botany at the annual conference of the Royal New Zealand Institute of Horticulture. She was also a keen birdwatcher, and a founder member of the Ornithological Society of New Zealand.

== Family ==
Sansom gave up teaching when she married fellow teacher Arthur Borne Vickery on 13 May 1921 in Invercargill. The Vickerys had one daughter together but after her husband's sudden death in 1923 Sansom resumed teaching to support herself. Sansom later married Norman Francis Sansom on 9 April 1924 on Stewart Island. Sansom was a carpenter and then later a Presbyterian minister. They had two children, a daughter and a son. Sansom died in Lorneville, near Invercargill, on 1 July 1989.

== Recognition ==
In 1960 the Southland branch of the Royal Society of New Zealand made Sansom a life member, and the Southland Museum and Art Gallery did similarly in 1966. In 1973 she was included in the first edition of The World Who’s Who of Women.

In the 1979 New Year Honours, Sansom was awarded the Queen's Service Medal for community service.

In 2017, Sansom was selected as one of the Royal Society Te Apārangi's 150 women in 150 words.

== Published work ==
Sansom broadcast general talks about science on the radio and gave lectures for the Correspondence School. She wrote a monthly newsletter about Stewart Island for three years from 1962, and was a book reviewer and features writer for the Southland Times. Sansom's published work includes:

- Olga Sansom (2006). In the grip of an island: early Stewart Island history. Invercargill: Cadsonbury Publications. ISBN 978-1-877346-14-9. OCLC 156630934. Wikidata Q105100263.
- Olga Sansom (1 January 1970). The Stewart Islanders. Wellington: Reed Publishing. ISBN 978-0-589-00454-5. LCCN 73598005. OCLC 199404. OL 5521957M. Wikidata Q105100262.
- Sansom, Olga (1975). "Habitat: Stewart Island". New Zealand's Nature Heritage. 7 (92). Wellington: 2557–2566. OCLC 773297063. Wikidata Q105100287.
- Sansom, Olga (1974). "Birds: the muttonbird". New Zealand's Nature Heritage. 1 (12). Wellington: 323–329. OCLC 773046822. Wikidata Q105100288.
- Olga Sansom (1974), One hundred years of schooling at Stewart Island, 1874–1974., Halfmoon Bay: Stewart Island School Centennial Committee, OCLC 153315210, Wikidata Q105100291
