= James Mason (health administrator) =

New Zealand doctor and public health administrator

Dr James Mason
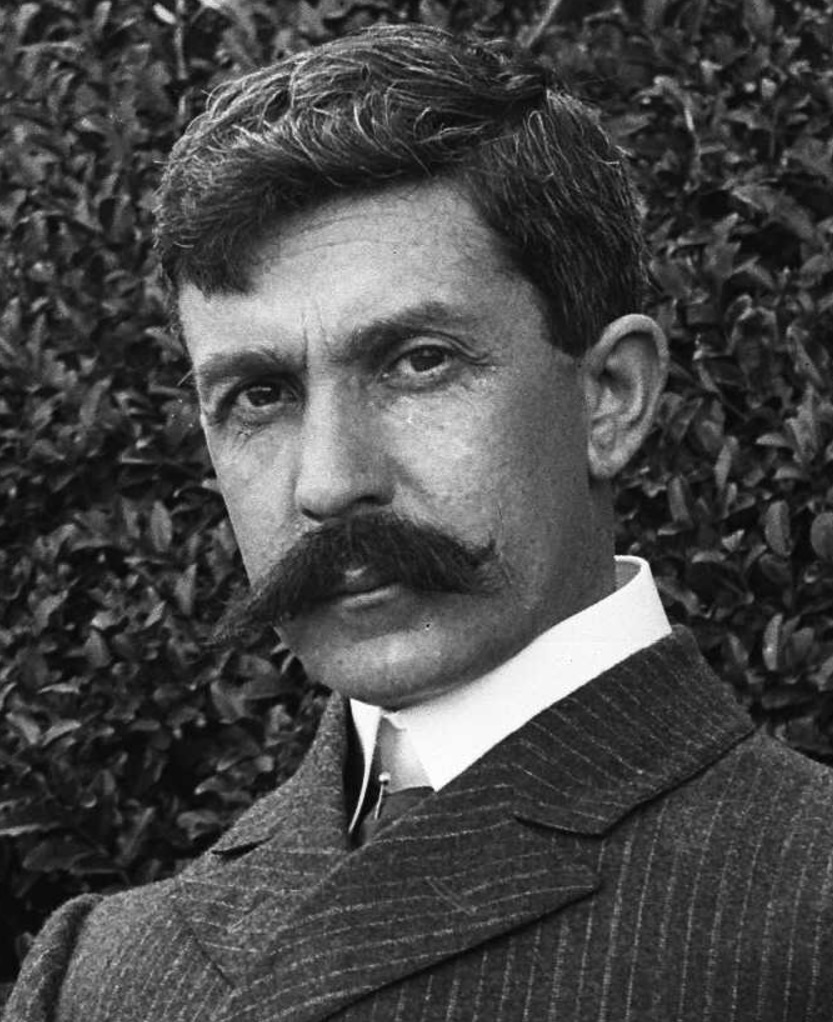

1st Chief Health Officer
- In office 1 December 1900 – June 1909
- Appointed by: Sir Joseph Ward
- Succeeded by: Thomas Valintine

Personal details
- Born: 22 August 1864 Arbroath, Scotland
- Died: 9 May 1924 (aged 59) Lower Hutt, New Zealand
- Spouse: Kate Susan Jenkins (m. 1891)
- Children: 2
- Education: Anderson's College Medical School

James Malcolm Mason (22 August 1864 – 9 May 1924) was a New Zealand medical doctor, bacteriologist and public health administrator who was instrumental in the creation of the New Zealand public health system in the early 20th century.

== Early life and education ==
Mason was born in Arbroath, Angus, Scotland on 22 August 1864. He received his Scottish medical qualifications (LRCP, LRCS and LFPS) from Anderson's College Medical School in 1887, followed by an MD in Brussels. In 1892 he gained a Diploma in Public Health from Cambridge. He also studied law.

== Career ==
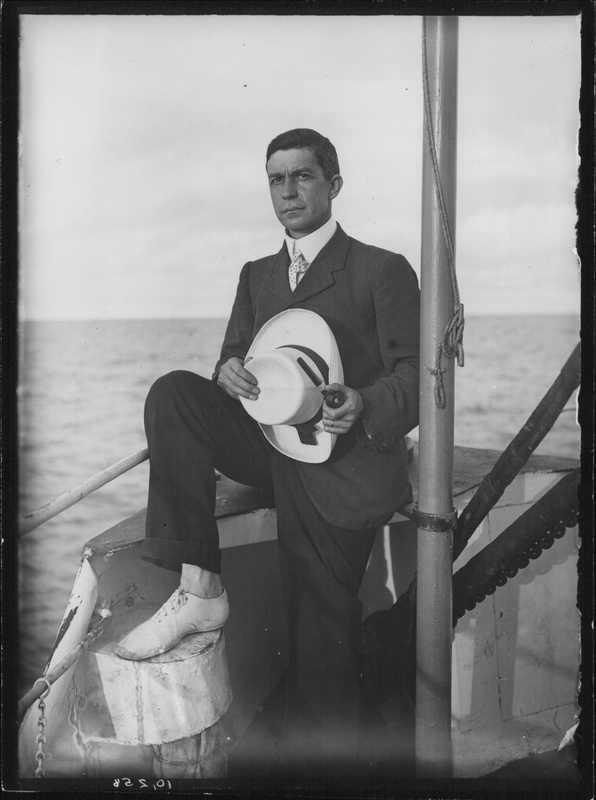
Mason in 1903

Mason practised in Portsmouth and Northumberland before emigrating to New Zealand in 1895. He set up in general practice in Ōtaki and was the surgeon at the cottage hospital which opened in 1899. Because of his medical and legal background he became parliamentary secretary of the New Zealand Branch of the British Medical Association in 1897, a role which oversaw communication between the government and the medical profession. He was able to get the government to open a state laboratory for bacteriological testing under John A. Gilruth. In 1900, with the threat of a bubonic plague outbreak, he advocated for the appointment of a Minister of Health, public health legislation and a centralised health administration. Mason and Gilruth were appointed to investigate New Zealand's sanitary conditions. The Public Health Act (1900) was passed and Mason was appointed as Chief Health Officer under Minister of Health Joseph Ward. Mason's qualifications and experience in bacteriology, public health and law, as well as having the confidence of his colleagues made him qualified for the position. He appointed six provincial medical officers of health, including Thomas Valintine and Robert Haldane Makgill.

Mason tackled several public health issues: preventive health, smallpox vaccinations, better sanitation, Māori health and tuberculosis treatment. He campaigned for the opening of sanitoria for tuberculosis patients. In 1902 the government opened the first one, Te Waikato Sanitorium for Consumptives near Cambridge.

Mason was responsible for reviving the New Zealand Medical Journal which had not been published for four years when he became editor in 1900. He edited it until 1905 when he went overseas.

In 1905, Mason contracted diphtheria and handed over to his assistant Chief Health Officer Thomas Valintine. He recuperated in North America and Europe studying public health. He returned to his job in 1906 and saw through the passage of two pieces of legislation: the Tohunga Suppression Act (1907) and the Quackery Prevention Act (1908) before resigning in 1909. He returned to London for a year before opening a private practice in Wellington and Lower Hutt. During his time in London he became a barrister and was called to the bar in 1911.

During World War I, Mason served as a bacteriologist on the hospital ship SS Marama.

== Personal life ==
Mason married Kate Susan Jenkins in London in 1891; they had a son and a daughter.

He died in Lower Hutt on 9 May 1924.

== Selected publications ==
- Some old truths about rural sanitation (1896)
- New Zealand and the Cook Islands : leprosy past and present (1904)
- The attitude of New Zealand towards consumption (1907)
- Some notes on military hygiene (1908)
- Sidelights on the work of a health officer (1908)
- Public Health in New Zealand (190?)

Government offices
New title	Chief Health Officer; 1900–1909	Succeeded by Thomas Valintine
