= Para O Tane Palace =

Coordinates: 21.20714°S 159.77313°W

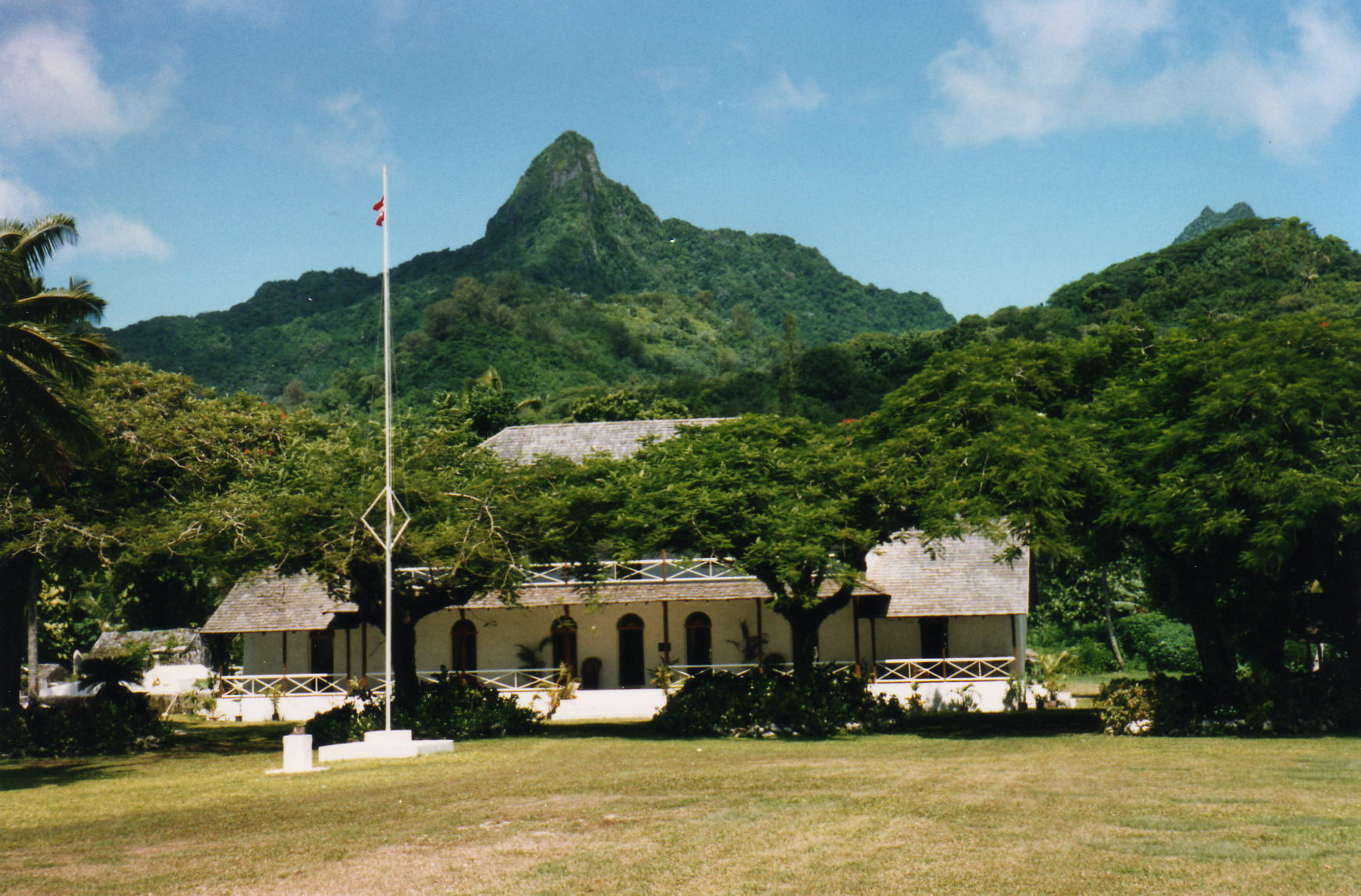
Para O Tane Palace, Rarotonga, Cook Islands

The Para O Tane Palace is a historic building in Avarua, Rarotonga in the Cook Islands. Built in the 1830s by Makea Pori Ariki, it was later the residence of Makea Takau Ariki and the place where she signed a treaty making the Cook Islands a British protectorate in 1888.

== History ==
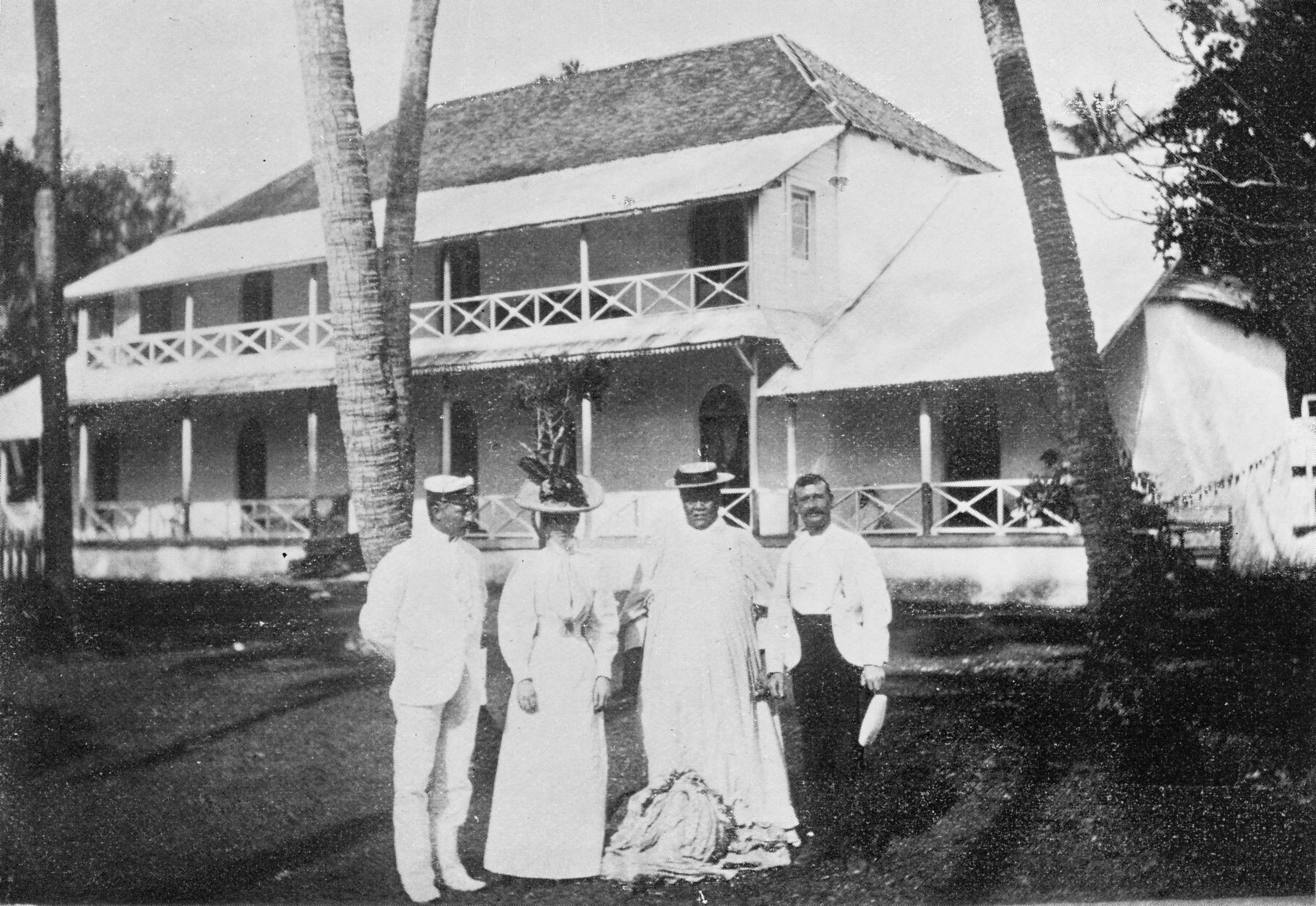
Queen Makea in front of the Palace, circa 1900

The palace is located on the grounds of the Taputapuatea marae, and was originally built in the 1830s as a single-story structure made of limestone and timber. It was later rebuilt as a two-story structure by Makea Takau Ariki, and served as the location of her royal court. Both the 1888 proclamation declaring the Cook Islands to be a British protectorate and the 1901 instrument of annexation by New Zealand were signed in the palace grounds. Beatrice Grimshaw gives a brief description of the palace during her visit to Rarotonga in 1907.

We walked through the blazing hot sun of the tropic afternoon, down the palm-shaded main street of Avarua town, to the great grassy enclosure that surrounds the palace of the queen. One enters through a neat white gate; inside are one or two small houses, a number of palms and flowering bushes, and at the far end, a stately two-storeyed building constructed of whitewashed concrete, with big railed-in verandahs, and handsome arched windows. This is Makea's palace, but her visitors do not go there to look for her. In true South Sea Islander fashion, she keeps a house for show and one for use.

The palace was badly damaged in a cyclone in 1942 or 1943, and later allowed to fall into ruins. It was restored and rebuilt between 1989 and 1993 by New Zealand architect Harry Turbott and a team of students from the Auckland University School of Architecture.
