= National Radiation Storage Facility (New Zealand) =

Coordinates: 40.180371°S 175.431376°E

The National Radiation Storage Facility is a radioactive waste storage facility in New Zealand. It is located near Sanson, New Zealand and operated by the Ministry of Health.

== History ==
From the 1950s to 1976 New Zealand dumped its radioactive waste at sea. Following the adoption of the London Convention on the Prevention of Marine Pollution by Dumping of Wastes and Other Matter and its expansion to include all nuclear waste, waste was instead stored in a shed at the National Radiation Laboratory in Christchurch. The building was damaged in the 2011 Christchurch earthquake, and in 2019 the government made a decision to move it to a purpose-built facility.

For security reasons the store was built on land owned by the New Zealand Defence Force, near RNZAF Base Ohakea. Construction began in 2022, and was carried out in secret, without informing neighbours or local iwi. The building was completed in early 2024, and waste was transferred to it from Christchurch in a special convoy of military vehicles. The existence of the facility itself remained secret until reported by the New Zealand Herald later that year.

== Function ==
The facility stores intermediate and low-level waste, primarily medical waste. The waste is encapsulated in concrete and monitored weekly.
