= John Cairney (anatomist) =

New Zealand anatomist, medical superintendent, writer (1898–1966)

Dr John Cairney CMG
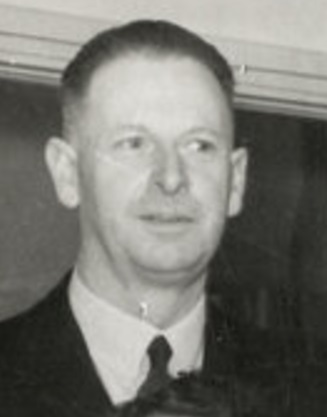

5th Director-General of Health
- In office February 1950 – October 1959
- Preceded by: Thomas Ritchie
- Succeeded by: Harold Turbott

Personal details
- Born: 8 October 1898 Greymouth, New Zealand
- Died: 5 August 1966 (aged 67) Wellington, New Zealand
- Spouse: Claris Dorothy Kempthorne (m. 1920)
- Children: 3
- Education: University of Otago

John Cairney CMG (8 October 1898 – 5 August 1966) was the New Zealand Director-General of Health and Inspector-General of Hospitals, an anatomist, a medical superintendent and a writer and painter.

Cairney was born in Greymouth, New Zealand, on 8 October 1898. He attended Greymouth District High School then medical school at the University of Otago where he graduated MBChB in 1922 and MD in 1925.

== Career ==
On graduating Cairney began his research and work in anatomy, studying in America from 1925 to 1926. On his return to New Zealand he was made the University of Otago medical school's first associate professor but soon after took up the position of medical superintendent of Hawera Hospital where he remained from 1927 to 1936. He continued his career in administration moving to Wellington Hospital in 1936 as director of clinical services becoming medical superintendent in 1940. In 1944 he became superintendent in chief of the Wellington Hospital Board when the Board expanded to include hospitals in the Hutt Valley and Silverstream.

In 1950 Cairney was appointed as Director General of Health over Harold Turbott who had expected to take the position. He was Director-General until 1959.

As well as his administrative positions Cairney wrote several books on anatomy for medical students and student nurses, some co-authored with Professor W. P. Gowland and his son Dr John Cairney (jnr). He taught at the Wellington School of Nursing. He was also active in numerous medical organisations: the Hospital Boards' Association of New Zealand, the New Zealand Branch of the British Medical Association, the Medical Superintendents’ Association of New Zealand, the Medical Research Council and Senate of the University of New Zealand.

Cairney died in Wellington on 5 August 1966.

== Honours and awards ==
In 1953, Cairney was awarded the Queen Elizabeth II Coronation Medal. In the 1960 New Year Honours, he was appointed a Companion of the Order of St Michael and St George.

== Selected publications ==
- Gowland, W. P., & Cairney, J. (1941). Anatomy and physiology for nurses / by W. P. Gowland, M.D., F.R.C.S., Professor of Anatomy in the University of Otago, New Zealand, and John Cairney, M.D., Director of Clinical Services, Wellington Hospital, New Zealand.
- Cairney, J. (1952). Surgery for students of nursing / by John Cairney ; with a foreword by M.I. Lambie. Peryer.
- Cairney, J., & Cairney, J. (1959). First studies in anatomy and physiology / by John Cairney and John Cairney. (2nd ed.). N.M. Peryer.
- Cairney, J., & Cairney, J. (1966). The human body : a survey of structure and function / by John Cairney and J. Cairney. N.M. Peryer.
