= Karen Poutasi =

New Zealand doctor and public servant (1949–2026)

Dame Karen Poutasi DNZM
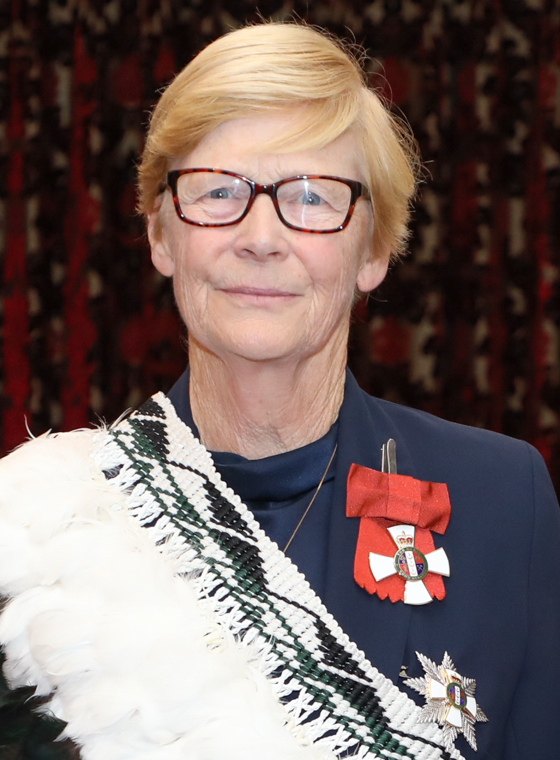
- Poutasi in 2021

12th Director-General of Health
- In office June 1995 – July 2006
- Preceded by: Chris Lovelace
- Succeeded by: Stephen McKernan

CEO of New Zealand Qualifications Authority
- In office 2006–2020
- Preceded by: Karen van Rooyen
- Succeeded by: Grant Klinkum

Personal details
- Born: Karen Olive Davidson; 12 July 1949 Ranfurly, New Zealand
- Died: 1 January 2026 (aged 76) Wellington, New Zealand
- Spouse: Samuelu Fa'apoi Poutasi (m. 1972, divorced)
- Children: 4
- Education: University of Otago; Harvard University

Dame Karen Olive Poutasi (née Davidson; 12 July 1949 – 1 January 2026) was a New Zealand government official. She was the first woman to serve as director-general of health in New Zealand. Through her work in the government, Poutasi aided her country through various large events, including the HIV/AIDS crisis and the high-profile murder of Malachi Subecz.

== Early life and education ==
Poutasi was born Karen Olive Davidson in Ranfurly on 12 July 1949, the daughter of Gladys Enid Davidson (née Edmonds) and John Davidson. She was educated at Gore High School between 1963 and 1967, completed medical training at the University of Otago, and studied management at Otago and at Harvard University.

== Career ==
In 1984, Poutasi was the deputy medical superintendent at Dunedin Hospital. She was awarded a Harkness Fellowship to study public health administration, health policies, and the quality of health care in the United States. Poutasi was medical superintendent of Middlemore Hospital, Auckland, until 1987, when she was appointed chief health officer at the Department of Health. In this role, she headed the Health Department's work to implement the recommendations of the Cartwright Inquiry on cervical cancer as well as New Zealand's efforts to control the spread of HIV/AIDS. In 1989, she was appointed general manager of the Wellington Area Health Board.

Poutasi served as director-general of health at the Ministry of Health from 1995 to 2006, and as chief executive officer of the New Zealand Qualifications Authority from 2006 to 2020. In 2019, she was seconded from the New Zealand Qualifications Authority to serve as Commissioner for the Waikato District Health Board; she left that post in 2022 when the district health boards were replaced with a single agency, Te Whatu Ora Health New Zealand. She was appointed to the board of Te Whatu Ora at its inception and became chair in 2023, succeeding Rob Campbell. She resigned that role in April 2024.

Poutasi also held governance roles on the board of Network for Learning from 2014 to 2022 and as chair of Taumata Arowai from 2023 until her death. In December 2022, she wrote a report on the murder of Malachi Subecz, criticising the inaction of Oranga Tamariki leading up to the case. This led to widespread reform within the government to implement preventative measures against the harm of children.

== Personal life and death ==
In 1972, she married Samuelu Fa'apoi Poutasi, whom she had met at the University of Otago where he was working in the National Cancer Research Centre as a research assistant. The couple had four children but later divorced. Her husband was ordained in the Presbyterian Church in 1986 and was later the chaplain of Wellington Hospital. He was appointed a Member of the New Zealand Order of Merit, for services to the community, in the 1998 Queen's Birthday Honours. He died in 2011.

Poutasi died on 1 January 2026 at the age of 76. Her funeral was held at St Paul's Cathedral, Wellington.

== Honours and awards ==
Poutasi received the New Zealand Suffrage Centennial Medal in 1993.

In the 2006 Queen's Birthday Honours, Poutasi was appointed a Companion of the New Zealand Order of Merit for services to health administration including as Director-General of Health. In the 2020 Queen's Birthday Honours, she was promoted to Dame Companion of the New Zealand Order of Merit for services to education and the state.

Government offices
Preceded by Chris Lovelace	Director-General of Health; 1995–2006	Succeeded by Stephen McKernan
