= Doug Kennedy (public servant) =

New Zealand doctor and public health administrator

Doug Kennedy ED
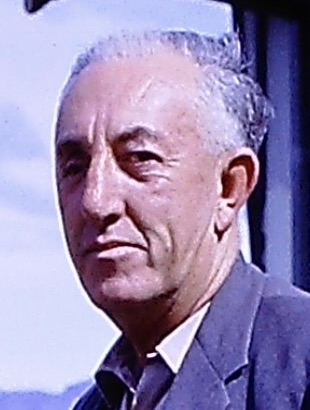
- Kennedy in 1970

7th Director-General of Health
- In office January 1965 – December 1972
- Preceded by: Harold Turbott
- Succeeded by: John Hiddlestone

Personal details
- Born: Douglas Peter Kennedy; 19 May 1915 Christchurch, New Zealand
- Died: 11 December 1972 (aged 57) Wellington, New Zealand
- Spouse: Mavis Honora Dreaver (m. 1946)
- Children: 2
- Profession: Medical administrator

Douglas Peter Kennedy ED (19 May 1915 – 11 December 1972) was a New Zealand doctor and public servant. He was Director-General of Health (i.e. the chief executive of the health service) until his sudden death.

== Biography ==
=== Early life ===
Kennedy was born in Christchurch on 19 May 1915. His father was Peter Kennedy. He was educated at St Andrew's College. He attended Canterbury College and the University of Otago at which he gained a Bachelor of Medicine and Bachelor of Surgery. During World War II he served as a Lieutenant colonel in the Royal New Zealand Army Medical Corps. After the war he remained in the RNZAMC as a reserve Colonel. In 1947 he obtained a diploma of public health from London University.

=== Career ===
In 1946 Kennedy joined the Department of Health and held medical officer posts in Christchurch and the West Coast for the next six years. From 1952 to 1955 Kennedy was Medical Officer of Health in Christchurch. He was then Assistant and Deputy Director of Public Health between 1957 and 1960 and later New Zealand's Director of Public Health from 1960 to 1964. In 1965 his career culminated in becoming Director-General of Health, succeeding Harold Turbott. As Director-General he instigated a new system of nurse education, which was praised by the Nurses Association.

Kennedy was involved in numerous boards and committees in the health sphere. He was chief cadet officer of the St John Ambulance Brigade and held senior posts in both the Red Cross Society and Royal Society of Health. From 1960 to 1965 he was a member of the Consumer Council from 1960 to 1965, chairman of the Hospital Works Committee and the Hospital Advisory Council, chairman of the Medical Research Council, and deputy chairman of the Board of Health, the deputy chairman of the Agricultural Chemicals Board until 1965, a member of the New Zealand Milk Board Pollution Advisory Council and a member of the New Zealand Medical Council.

Kennedy was known on the international stage, representing New Zealand at world health assemblies and was elected to the executive board of the World Health Organization (WHO) in 1966. He was a member of the WHO expert committee on insecticides, the WHO expert advisory panel on public health administration, a joint expert committee of the WHO and International Labour Organization (ILO) on occupational health as well as the ILO panel of consultants on safety and health in the agricultural industry. In 1961 he led New Zealand's delegation to the United Nations' convention on narcotics held in New York City. In 1964 he was elected the vice-chairman of the WHO regional committee's meeting in Manila. During the War in Vietnam he made frequent visits to New Zealand's civilian and military medical teams in Quy Nhon and Bồng Sơn.

=== Family and death ===
Kennedy married Sister Mavis Dreaver, the daughter of Mary Dreaver and J. A. Dreaver, in 1946 in Bari Italy. They were to have one son and one daughter.

On 11 December 1972 Kennedy suddenly collapsed at his Wellington home of a heart attack and died soon after in hospital, aged 57. He was at work earlier that day, showing no signs of ill-health. Kennedy was survived by his wife, son Peter and daughter Margaret. He was cremated and his ashes interred at the Military Services section, Karori Cemetery.

Government offices
Preceded by Harold Turbott	Director-General of Health; 1965–1972	Succeeded by John Hiddlestone
