= Michael Watt (physician) =

New Zealand physician and public health administrator (1887–1967)

Dr Michael Watt CBE
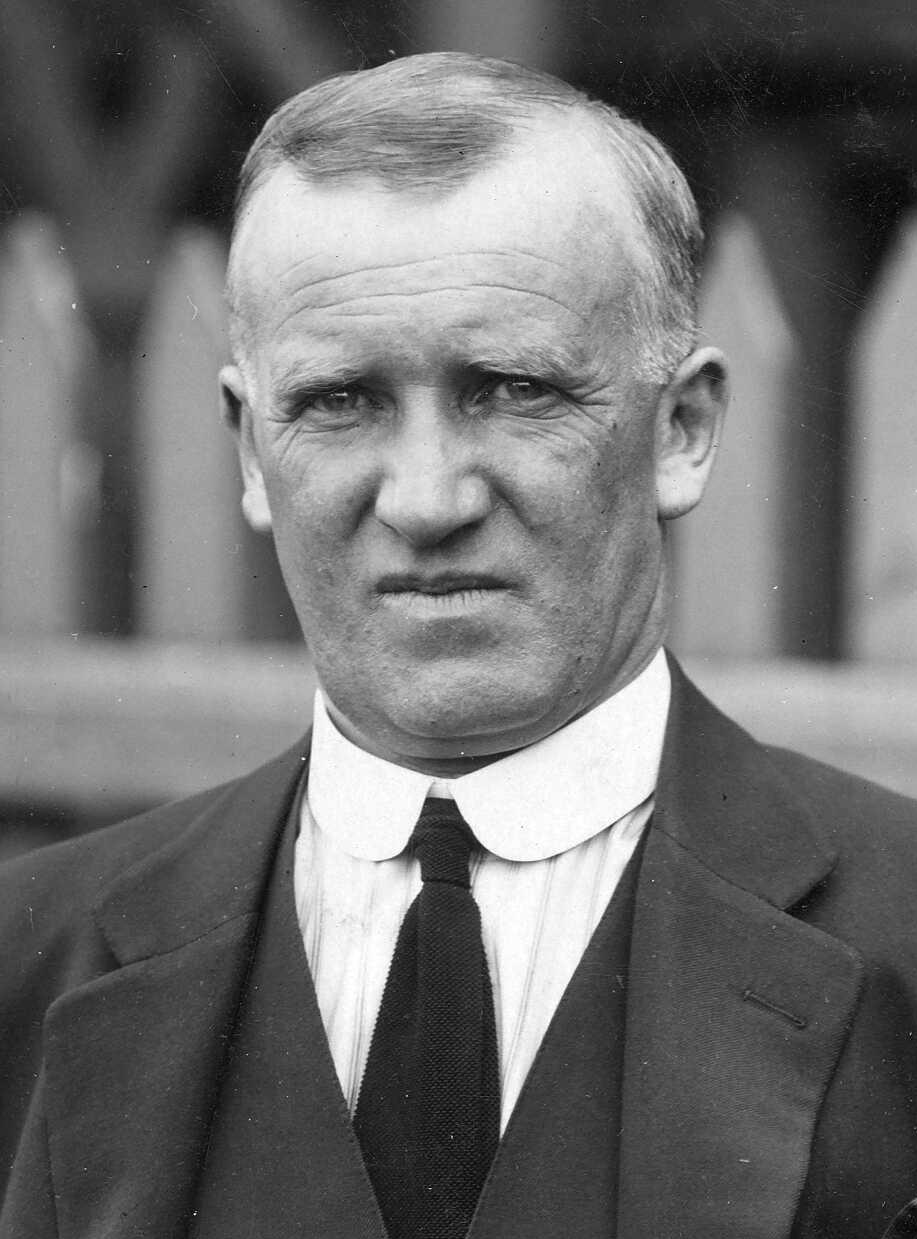

3rd Director-General of Health
- In office December 1930 – March 1947
- Preceded by: Thomas Valintine
- Succeeded by: Thomas Ritchie

Personal details
- Born: 16 March 1887 Green Island, Otago, New Zealand
- Died: 7 April 1967 (aged 80) Wellington, New Zealand
- Spouse: Mary Roberta McCahon (m. 1913)
- Children: 2
- Education: University of Otago

Michael Herbert Watt CBE (16 March 1887 – 7 April 1967) was a New Zealand physician and public health administrator.

== Early life and education ==
Watt was born in Green Island, Otago, the 11th child of Michael Watt, a Presbyterian minister who taught at Presbyterian Theological College in Dunedin, and his wife, Isabella Shand, both of whom were from Scotland. He was educated at Otago Boys' High School and earned MB and ChB degrees from the University of Otago in 1910. After a year of clinical experience in London, Wolverhampton and Dublin, he received his MD in 1912. In the mid-1910s, he earned a Diploma in Public Health from the same university, the second person to do so.

== Career ==
Watt was in private practice in Ngāruawāhia from 1911. In 1914 he became a demonstrator in physiology at the University of Otago, and in 1915 an instructor in anatomy. The following year, he left this position to become a part-time district health officer in the Department of Public Health, and in 1917 became district health officer in Wellington, the first holder of such a position born and trained in New Zealand.

After the 1920 departmental reforms, Watt became the first director of the Division of Public Health, and in 1925 he became deputy director general of health and in 1930, director general, succeeding Thomas Valintine. With the outbreak of the Second World War, in 1939 he was appointed to chair a wartime medical advisory committee and in 1942 as controller of the Hospitals Emergency Precautions Service. He retired in 1947. From 1948 to 1947, he was UNICEF's regional director for Southeast Asia; appointed in 1949 to head the Far East mission, he was unable to take up the post after a medical examination led to his being diagnosed with chronic lymphatic leukaemia.

Moulded by the 1913 smallpox epidemic and by study tours of Japan and North America in 1925 and of North America, Britain and Scandinavia in 1938, Watt was a strong advocate of immunisation, tuberculosis eradication, health and dietary education and industrial health and safety. He played a major role in establishing the Journal of the New Zealand Branch of the Royal Sanitary Institute (1934), the Medical Research Council of New Zealand (1937) and the South Pacific Board of Health (1944), and laid the groundwork for the establishment of the National Health Institute.

== Honours ==
In the 1935 King's Birthday Honours, Watt was appointed a Commander of the Order of the British Empire for his services to public health.

== Personal life and death ==
Watt married Mary Roberta McCahon in 1913 at Timaru; they had two sons, both of whom also entered medicine; his elder son, James Watt, was the first professor of paediatrics in New Zealand. He died in Wellington on 7 April 1967.

Government offices
Preceded by Thomas Valintine	Director-General of Health; 1930–1947	Succeeded by Thomas Ritchie
