= Morrie Church =

Former NZ RL coach and rugby league footballer

Personal information
- Full name: Maurice Walter Church
- Born: 4 October 1922; New Zealand
- Died: 4 January 1981 (aged 58); Porirua, New Zealand

Coaching information
Club
Years	Team	Gms	W	D	L	W%
	Mirimar (WRL)
Representative
Years	Team	Gms	W	D	L	W%
1970	New Zealand	3	0	0	3	0
- Source: RLP

Maurice Walter "Morrie" Church QSM (4 October 1922 – 4 January 1981) was a New Zealand rugby league coach who coached New Zealand.

== Family ==
Morrie was married to Joy Church (née Bracefield). They had six children Barry, Irene, David, Allan, Graham and Stephen.

== Playing career ==
Church coached Miramar in the Wellington Rugby League competition and in 1970 coached the New Zealand Kiwis for three matches.

In the 1979 New Year Honours, Church was awarded the Queen's Service Medal for community service. He died in Porirua on 4 January 1981.
