= Health Funding Authority =

Defunct New Zealand government entity

Agency overview
- Formed: 1997
- Preceding agency: Regional Health Authorities
- Dissolved: 1 January 2001
- Superseding agency: Ministry of Health; District Health Boards
- Jurisdiction: New Zealand
- Minister responsible: Minister of Health
- Agency executive: Chief Executive Officer
- Website: http://www.hfa.govt.nz

The Health Funding Authority, now defunct, was a New Zealand government entity responsible for funding of public health care in New Zealand between 1997 and 2001.

== History ==
It was formed through the merger of the four Regional Health Authorities (RHAs) as part of the coalition agreement between the New Zealand National Party and New Zealand First following the 1996 general election. The premise was that having a separate purchaser could provide greater efficiency within the health system.

Following the 1999 General Election the new government, left wing New Zealand Labour Party-led coalition set about changing the health system once more; in part due to low public confidence in the health system since the quasi-market reforms attempted earlier in the decade by the previous National Party government.

The HFA was forcibly dissolved by an Act of Parliament, with its purchasing roles picked up by the Ministry of Health and the District Health Boards (DHB) as part of the new Primary Care Strategy outlined in Labour's 1999 election campaign. In January the DHBs came into existence and the HFA functions were absorbed by them and Minister of Health.
