= Peter Kennedy (diplomat) =

New Zealand diplomat

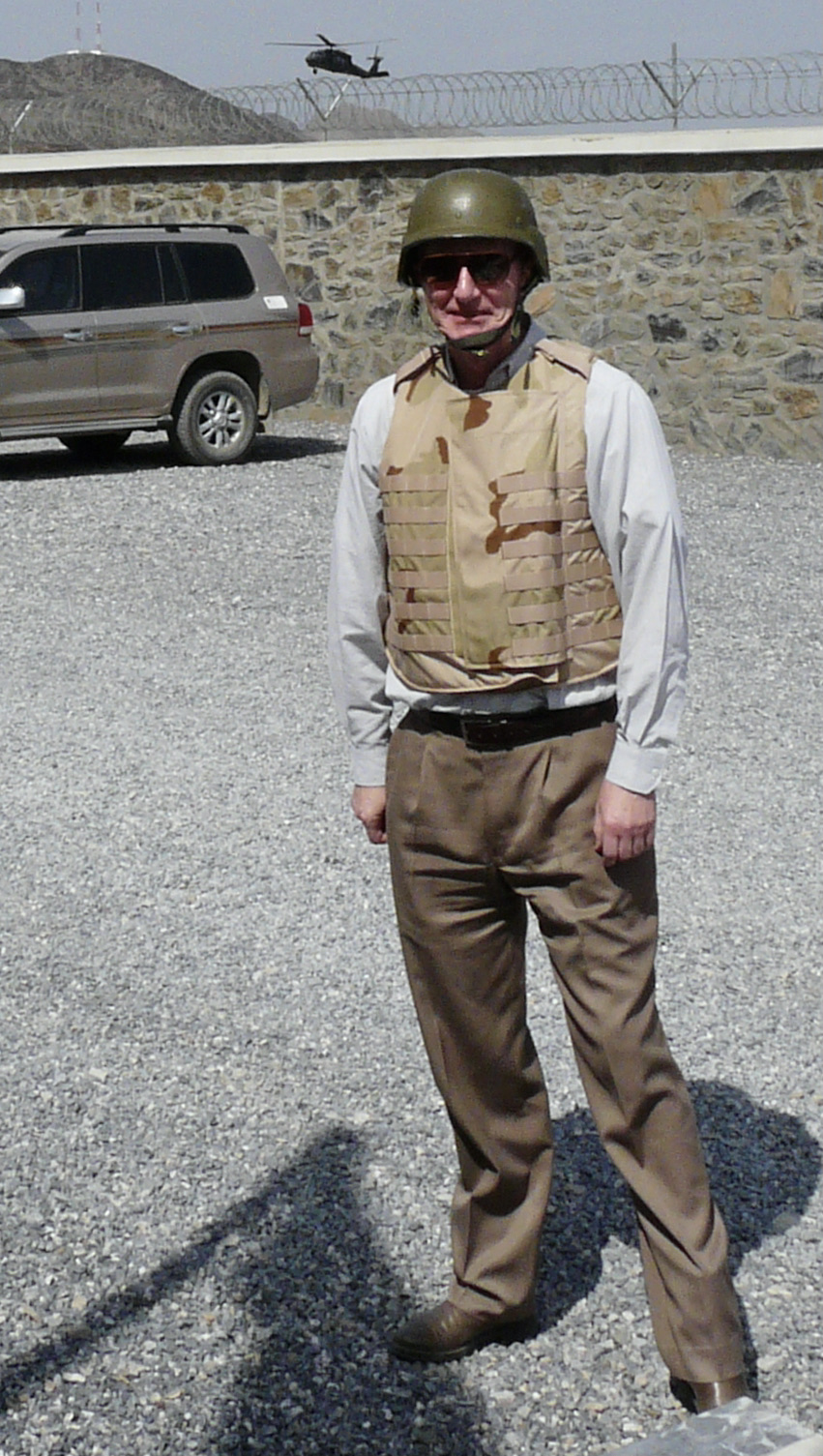
- Kennedy in Afghanistan
- In office 2007 – 2011

Personal details
- Born: 1949 (age 76–77) Christchurch, South Island, New Zealand
- Education: Harvard Kennedy School
- Occupation: New Zealand diplomat and foreign policy writer

Peter Kennedy was New Zealand Ambassador to South Korea from 1993 to 1995, following three years as foreign policy adviser to Prime Minister Jim Bolger. During this period Korean visitors to New Zealand jumped from 27,300 to 104,400 (reaching a peak of 127,400 in 1996). He was later New Zealand Ambassador to the EU, NATO, Belgium and Luxembourg from 2007 until August 2011. Whilst in Brussels, he was cross accredited as Ambassador to Romania and became New Zealand's first Ambassador to Bulgaria. In his NATO capacity he undertook an official visit to Afghanistan with other NATO/ISAF ambassadors in 2009. As Ambassador to the EU he was instrumental in beginning the process that led to the EU/NZ Free Trade Agreement concluded in June 2022. The New Zealand Prime Minister Jacinda Adern confirmed on 30 June 2022 that it "had taken 14 years” since the idea was first floated.

Born in Christchurch in 1949, Kennedy is the son of medical doctor Doug Kennedy (public servant), NZ Director General of Health from 1965 until his death in 1972. His maternal grandmother Mary Dreaver was the first female Member of Parliament from Auckland (and the third female MP in New Zealand history). Graduating from Victoria University of Wellington, Kennedy was admitted as a Barrister and Solicitor of the High Court in 1974 and subsequently attended Harvard University, Harvard Kennedy School SMP (1998).

== Diplomatic career ==
After initial postings in Apia and Geneva, where in 1986 he was elected Chair of the GATT Committee on Technical Barriers to Trade, Kennedy was appointed International Affairs Adviser to New Zealand Prime Minister Jim Bolger, a role he held from 1990 to 1993. This period coincided with the Gulf War (and the Kuwait hostage crisis) and New Zealand's second election to the UN Security Council. Subsequently, he became Ambassador to the Republic of Korea (1993–95), at the time the youngest ever appointee from New Zealand.

Returning to New Zealand as Principal Trade Adviser he participated in numerous GATT and OECD meetings before taking over the division responsible for New Zealand's relations with Australia. He was instrumental in setting up the Australia New Zealand Leadership Forum becoming its first New Zealand Executive Secretary. He had earlier in his career drafted the Services Protocol between Australia and New Zealand that led to liberalisation of services within each country. This was the first comprehensive multi-sector bilateral agreement in the world to govern trade in services. After he returned from his final posting in Brussels he became the executive director of the New Zealand Institute of International Affairs, a position he held until his retirement in 2015. More recently he has been co-facilitator for the China Capable Masterclass run by the NZ Contemporary China Research Centre.

Kennedy has published many articles on international issues, including "Current and Future Trade Developments in Agriculture", "Whither Brussels", "After the Missions: predicting New Zealand's security future", "Syria: is there an end in sight?" and "The Way Forward: a perspective on patchwork governance". He is also the editor of The Arctic and Antarctica: Differing Currents of Change.
