= Tui Mayo =

New Zealand nurse, hospital matron and politician (1905–1993)

Tui Alfreda Mayo QSM (13 January 1905 – 8 March 1993) was a New Zealand nurse, hospital matron and local politician. She was born in Aorangi, Manawatu/Horowhenua, New Zealand, on 13 January 1905.

In the 1979 New Year Honours, Mayo was awarded the Queen's Service Medal for public services.
