= John Hiddlestone =

New Zealand doctor and public health administrator

John Hiddlestone CMG
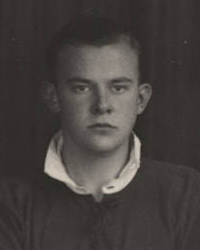
- Hiddlestone in 1941

8th Director-General of Health
- In office January 1973 – March 1983
- Preceded by: Doug Kennedy
- Succeeded by: Ron Baker

Personal details
- Born: Herbert John Hall Hiddlestone; 12 March 1925 Auckland, New Zealand
- Died: 27 January 2008 (aged 82) Nelson, New Zealand
- Spouse: Rosina Maclean (m. 1949)
- Children: 5
- Profession: Medical administrator

Herbert John Hall Hiddlestone CMG (12 March 1925 – 27 January 2008) was a New Zealand doctor and public servant. He was Director-General of Health for ten years from 1973 to 1983.

== Biography ==
=== Early life ===
Hiddlestone was born in Auckland in 1925, the son of Reverend John Hiddlestone. He was educated at Auckland Grammar School later attending the University of Otago to study medicine. He graduated as a Doctor of Medicine in 1948.

He married Rosina Mabel Patricia Maclean on 10 February 1949, with whom he had one son and four daughters.

=== Career ===
From 1949 to 1951 he was the house surgeon at Nelson Hospital before moving to the United Kingdom. In 1952 he became the house physician for the chest unit in Edinburgh until 1953 when he shifted to Royal Brompton Hospital in London as the senior house surgeon. He returned to New Zealand and from 1954 to 1966 he was a specialist physician and medical superintendent to the Nelson Hospital Board. From 1966 to 1970 he was medical superintendent-in-chief of the Southland Hospital Board. In 1970 he was employed by the Department of Health as the Director of Hospitals. In 1973 he was appointed Director-General of Health, the head of the department.

As Director-General Hiddlestone had an international role frequently representing New Zealand in the World Health Organization (WHO). He was vice-president of the World Health Assembly in 1975, elected to the executive board of WHO and appointed its chairman in 1982.

Hiddlestone was a Fellow of the Royal Australasian College of Physicians and member of the Royal College of Physicians of Edinburgh. In the 1983 Queen's Birthday Honours, Hiddlestone was appointed a Companion of the Order of St Michael and St George.

Hiddlestone retired as Director-General in 1983 to become Director of Health for the United Nations Relief and Works Agency for Palestinian refugees in Lebanon, the Gaza Strip, the West Bank, Syria and Jordan. The position was based in Vienna, but he travelled to the Middle-East regularly in his role. He worked to improve the provision of health services to refugees, despite having a miserly budget to work with.

=== Later life and death ===
Hiddlestone died in Nelson in on 27 January 2008, at the age of 82, and his ashes were buried in Marsden Valley Cemetery. His wife, Rosina, died in 2013.

== Citations ==
Government offices
Preceded by Doug Kennedy	Director-General of Health; 1973–1983	Succeeded by Ron Baker
