= Thomas Valintine =

New Zealand doctor and public health administrator

Dr Thomas Valintine CBE
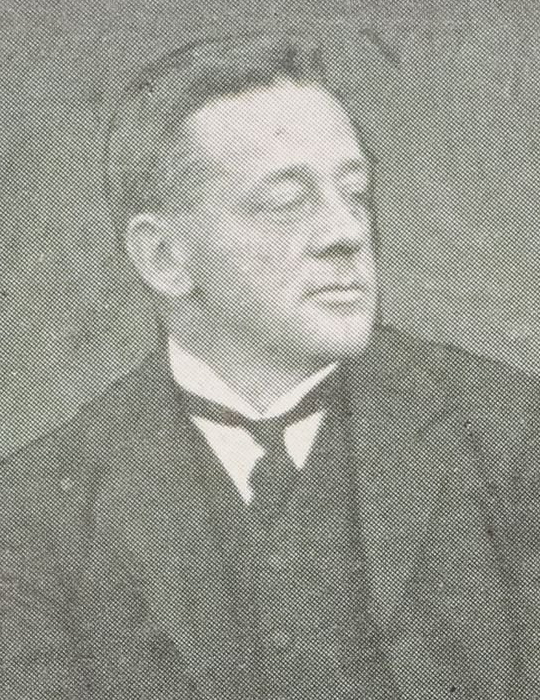

2nd Director-General of Health (Note: The title Chief Health Officer was used until 1920)
- In office June 1909 – December 1930
- Preceded by: James Mason
- Succeeded by: Michael Watt

Personal details
- Born: 1 August 1865 Westhampnett, Sussex, England
- Died: 30 August 1945 (aged 80) Wanganui, New Zealand
- Spouse(s): Margaret Ellis McTaggart (m. 1891–1910) Barbara Vickers (m. 1911)
- Children: 7
- Education: Royal College of Physicians

Thomas Harcourt Ambrose Valintine CBE (1 August 1865 – 30 August 1945) was a New Zealand medical doctor and public health administrator, who spent the first three decades of the 20th century dedicated to public health. He was responsible for major tuberculosis treatment initiatives in New Zealand, the introduction of district nursing and a pioneering health education campaign.

== Early life ==
Valintine was born in Westhampnett, Sussex, England, in 1865, and was educated at Marlborough College, Wiltshire. He graduated with medical and surgical qualifications and a Royal College of Physicians Diploma in Public Health at St Bartholomew's Hospital in London. He later qualified as a Licentiate of the Society of Apothecarie (LSA). Apothecaries provided most medical services to lower- and middle-class people outside London.

== Career ==
Valintine commenced his career working in the West Sussex Hospital and a Portsmouth asylum before emigrating to New Zealand in 1891. He took on a rural practice in Inglewood riding on horseback to remote areas as far afield as Whangamōmona. One of his legs was amputated below the knee after a horse riding accident in 1894 but he continued in his general practice role. He traded the rigours of horseback-riding backblocks medicine for the less physically demanding role of public health official after his presentation on artificial limbs at the 1901 annual meeting of the New Zealand branch of the British Medical Association. He was appointed by James Mason, the Chief Health Officer, as New Zealand’s first district health officer and quickly rose to the position of Assistant Chief Health Officer by 1902.

He took an interest in the treatment of tuberculosis (TB), campaigning for a sanatorium in Ōtaki in 1904 and for hospital TB annexes in other towns and districts. He is credited with opening the first tuberculosis annex at the New Plymouth Hospital in 1905.

When Mason was ill with diphtheria in 1905 Valintine temporarily took over the role of Chief Health Officer. In 1907 he became Inspector of Hospitals and Charitable Institutions, a role separate from the Chief Health Officer. In this role Valintine advocated for a hospital system that served urban and rural areas and included a district nursing service. He also proposed, while Mason had been absent, that the two departments of hospitals and public health be amalgamated, a move which caused conflict between the two men. In 1909 Valintine replaced Mason as Chief Health Officer and remained as Inspector of Hospitals; the two roles were later rolled into the position of Director General of Health.

Valintine took an interest in the treatment of tuberculosis (TB), campaigning for a sanatorium in Ōtaki in 1904 and for hospital TB annexes in other towns and districts. He is credited with opening the first tuberculosis annex at the New Plymouth Hospital in 1905. He renewed his interest in TB after 1909 planning for notification of the disease, public education, treatment in sanatoria and occupational therapy for convalescents, and district nursing services.

Other initiatives of Valentine's were for the Department of Health to take over the coordination of the native medical service, to arrange for the Department of Education to undertake medical inspections in schools and to outline a plan for district nursing services in remote rural areas, which was supported by Hester Maclean, the assistant inspector of hospitals.

In 1915, during the First World War, he became director of military hospitals. After the war he remained with the Defence Department, conducting an inquiry into a 1916 outbreak of respiratory diseases at the Trentham Military Camp. He returned to civilian service becoming Director General of Health in 1920 after the passing of the Health Act (1920). The Director General's responsibilities covered public hygiene, hospitals, nursing, school hygiene, dental hygiene, child welfare and Māori health.

Valentine promoted health education during the final ten years of his career and is credited with the statement, "It is better policy to teach people to live healthily and to prevent disease than it is to treat them as irresponsible units for whom care has to be provided". This ethos drove the department's campaigns to reduce maternal mortality. He appointed Dr Elaine Gurr to oversee the creation of the first ante-natal clinics.

Valentine retired in 1930. He died in Wanganui on 30 August 1945.

== Honours and awards ==
Valintine was appointed a Commander of the Order of the British Empire (CBE) in the 1919 King's Birthday Honours for his services during the First World War.

== Personal life ==
Valentine married Margaret Ellis McTaggart in New Plymouth in 1891. They had two daughters and a son but Margaret died from a complication of pregnancy in 1910. In 1911 Valentine married his second wife Barbara Vickers in Christchurch. He had seven children in all.

Government offices
Preceded by James Mason	Director-General of Health; 1909–1930	Succeeded by Michael Watt
