= Dean Goffin =

New Zealand composer (1916–1984)

Sir Dean Goffin
- Born: July 9, 1916; Wellington, New Zealand
- Died: January 23, 1984 (aged 67); New Zealand
- Education: University of Otago
- Occupations: composer, Salvation Army officer
- Known for: pioneering Salvation Army composer, Rhapsody in Brass, Symphony of Thanksgiving
- Awards: Knight Bachelor (1983)

Sir Dean Goffin (9 July 1916 – 23 January 1984) was one of New Zealand's first prolific Salvation Army composers who composed not only music for the Army but for non-Army bands as well.

== Biography ==
He grew up in a musically active Salvation Army family, his father a famous bandmaster and composer of popular marches. From a very young age he was active in the musical life of New Zealand, both in and out of the Salvation Army, becoming, at the age of 19, bandmaster of the famed Wellington South Corps. During World War II he served as a military musician, forming and training the band of the 20th Infantry Battalion of the 4th Brigade that was active in the Middle East.

Goffin was the first major Salvation Army composer to complete a bachelor in music from the University of Otago in 1950. Shortly after he trained to become a Salvation Army Officer, serving initially in New Zealand, then in Great Britain where he held the positions of National Bandmaster (1956–1960) and National Secretary for bands and Songster Brigades (1960–1966). Transferred back to New Zealand (1966), Goffin assumed senior administrative positions culminating in his appointment as Territorial Commander (1980). Goffin was appointed a Knight Bachelor in the 1983 Queen's Birthday Honours.

His major works include: Meditation – The Light of the World; Symphony of Thanksgiving, written for the International Staff Band of The Salvation Army in 1951 for their Diamond Jubilee Celebration; and Rhapsody In Brass, selected for the 1949 British Open Brass Band Championships at Belle Vue. Rhapsodic Variation – My Strength My Tower was conceived as a test piece for Brass Band but its publication was prevented by his commissioning as a Salvation Army officer, until it was modified for publication as by the Salvation Army.
