= David Kear (geologist) =

New Zealand geologist and science administrator (1923–2019)

David Kear CMG
- Born: 29 October 1923; London, England
- Died: 5 March 2019 (aged 95); Auckland, New Zealand
- Education: University of London
- Spouse: Joan Bridges (m. 1948; died 2013)
- Scientific career
- Fields: Geology
- Workplaces: New Zealand Geological Survey; Department of Scientific and Industrial Research
- Thesis: Geology of the Te Akau District, West Auckland, New Zealand, and its regional implications (1963)

David Kear CMG (29 October 1923 – 5 March 2019) was a New Zealand geologist and science administrator. He served as director-general of the Department of Scientific and Industrial Research from 1980 to 1983.

== Early life and education ==
Born in London on 29 October 1923, Kear was educated at Sevenoaks School in Kent. He went on to study at Imperial College London from 1941 to 1944, graduating with a Bachelor of Science in engineering in 1944. After serving as a sub-lieutenant in the Royal Navy between 1944 and 1947, he returned to Imperial College for further study from 1947 to 1948, and completed a Bachelor of Science degree. He later received a PhD from the University of London in 1963. The title of his doctoral thesis was Geology of the Te Akau District, West Auckland, New Zealand, and its regional implications.

In 1948, Kear married Joan Kathleen Rose Bridges in Maidstone, Kent, and the couple went on to have three children.

== Career ==
Kear worked at the New Zealand Geological Survey (NZGS) from 1948 to 1974. He was district geologist at Ngāruawāhia between 1949 and 1958, and at Auckland from 1958 to 1965. He served as chief economics geologist from 1963 and 1967, and was director of the NZGS from 1967 to 1974.

In 1974, Kear was appointed assistant director-general of the New Zealand Department of Scientific and Industrial Research from 1974, and as director general from 1980 to 1983, when he retired.

Kear wrote more than 125 scientific papers and books on New Zealand and Western Samoan geology and volcanology. He served as vice president of the Royal Society of New Zealand from 1975 to 1979, and president of the Geological Society of New Zealand from 1959 to 1960.

== Honours ==
Kear was elected a Fellow of the Australasian Institute of Mining and Metallurgy in 1964, and a Fellow of the Royal Society of New Zealand in 1973. In the 1983 Queen's Birthday Honours, Kear was appointed a Companion of the Order of St Michael and St George.

== Later life and death ==
In retirement, Kear lived in Ōhope, In 2009, he was one of six New Zealanders who signed an open letter from 141 international scientists to the Secretary-General of the United Nations, Ban Ki-moon, skeptical of the available evidence for anthropogenic global warming and challenging the UNFCC and the 2009 United Nations Climate Change Conference to provide further evidence to support the scientific consensus on climate change.

Kear died in Auckland on 5 March 2019, having been predeceased by his wife, Joan, in 2013.
