= Harold Turbott =

New Zealand doctor, public health administrator, broadcaster, and writer

Harold Turbott ISO
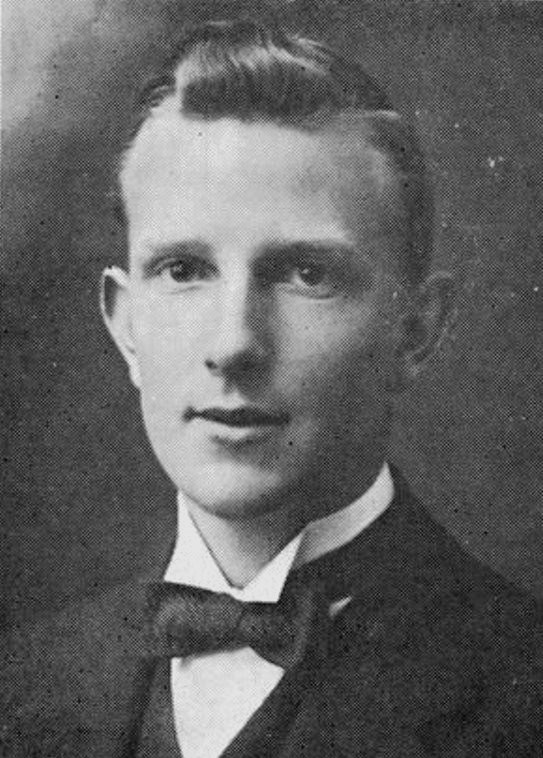
- Turbott in the 1920s

6th Director-General of Health
- In office October 1959 – December 1964
- Preceded by: John Cairney
- Succeeded by: Doug Kennedy

Personal details
- Born: Harold Bertram Turbott; 5 August 1899 Auckland, New Zealand
- Died: 16 March 1988 (aged 88) Lower Hutt, New Zealand
- Children: 3
- Relatives: Harry Turbott (son)
- Education: University of Otago
- Occupation: Public health administrator
- Known for: Radio doctor

Harold Bertram Turbott ISO (5 August 1899 – 16 March 1988) was a New Zealand medical doctor, public health administrator, broadcaster and writer. For four decades he broadcast a weekly talk on health on the radio.

== Early life ==
Turbott was born in Auckland on 5 August 1899, moving to Hamilton as a child where he attended Hamilton High School. He was dux of the school and went on to study medicine at the University of Otago, qualifying in 1923 after topping the class in midwifery.

== Career ==
Turbott's first job was as a house surgeon at Waikato Hospital; he intended to become a surgeon. In 1923 he was persuaded that experience in India and China would be valuable and he went to work in a hospital near Canton (Guangzhou). While in China he spent three months researching hookworm for the Rockefeller Foundation, followed by a course in radiology in Beijing (Peking).

By the time he returned to New Zealand he had decided on a career in public health but as graduates from Britain were preferred in the field he returned to Dunedin to lecture in bacteriology and to complete a diploma in public health. In 1927 he became assistant medical officer of health (MoH) in Auckland. He was able to initiate a diphtheria immunisation programme for school children to quell an epidemic.

Later in 1927 he was appointed MoH in Gisborne. This was interrupted by a period in 1928 when he was in Western Samoa with the expeditionary force to quell the Mau uprising.

As MoH in Gisborne, Turbott recognised the problems causing Māori ill health: infectious diseases, poor housing, and inadequate water supplies and waste disposal. In 1933 he worked on tuberculosis in Māori on a fellowship from the British Medical Research Council. The community was resistant to the project so Turbott sought the assistance of Sir Āpirana Ngata who was Minister of Maori Affairs. Turbott was able to instigate isolation shelters for the home treatment of tuberculosis patients.

From 1935 to 1936, Turbott was chief medical officer in Western Samoa where there was a need to tackle tropical diseases and infant welfare. Returning to Auckland in 1936 he became MoH in South Auckland. There was high Māori mortality, and diphtheria, typhoid and tuberculosis were rife. In 1940, Turbott's campaign for public health, particularly better sanitation, was recognised by the prime minister Peter Fraser and government allocated £40,000 for the construction of privies and water tanks. This initiative was supported by Te Puea Herangi.

In 1940, Turbott took up the position of director of school hygiene in the Department of Health where he promoted the public health nursing service. In 1947, he became deputy director general of health (public health), and director general of health in 1959. His appointment to director general was marred by an appeal by Dr A. W. S. Thompson who then sued Turbott for damages because of comments Turbott made during the appeal process.

=== Radio doctor ===
Turbott became the radio doctor from 1943 to 1984 broadcasting a seven-minute talk on health every week, taking on the position from Colin Scrimgeour. The radio doctor talks were viewed with some suspicion by his colleagues but later grudgingly accepted.

=== Other activities ===
Turbott was president of the World Health Organization from 1960 to 1961 and chairman from 1964 to 1965. He served on the Wellington Hospital Board from 1968 to 1983. He also served on other organisations: the local drainage board, the Traffic Institute and the Old People's Welfare Council.

== Honours ==
In 1953, Turbott was awarded the Queen Elizabeth II Coronation Medal. In the 1959 Queen's Birthday Honours, he was appointed a Companion of the Imperial Service Order.

== Personal life ==
Turbott married his first wife Eveline Arthur in 1923. After their divorce he married Robinetta Jamieson in 1938. He had one daughter and two sons, one of whom was Harry Turbott, a New Zealand architect.

Turbott died on 16 March 1988 in Hutt Hospital, Lower Hutt.

== Publications ==
- Turbott, H.; Mackay, N. (1935). Tuberculosis in the Maori, East Coast, New Zealand. Wellington: Department of Health in conjunction with Medical Research Council of Great Britain.
- Downs, E.A.; Turbott, H.B. (1937). Health for Samoa. Translated by I'iga, Ielu; Mama, Atimalala. Wellington: Government Printer.
- Turbott, H. (1946). Radio talks on health. Wellington: Whitcombe & Tombs.
- Turbott, H.B. (1952). "New Zealand and rehabilitation". New Zealand Nursing Journal. 45 (2): 44–46.
- Turbott, H.B. (1957). "Nurses; their education and their role in health programmes". New Zealand Nursing Journal. 50 (3): 103–110.
- Turbott, H. (1958). Answers to allegations about fluoridation. Wellington: Department of Health.
- Turbott, H.B. (1962). "Mental illness: a public health problem". New Zealand Nursing Journal. 55 (12): 16–17.
- Turbott, H. (1969). Guidelines to health: a family encyclopedia of health, illness and first aid. Wellington: A.H. & A.W. Reed.
- Turbott, H. (1983). The Radio Doctor's guidelines to health for New Zealanders (2nd revised ed.). Wellington: Reed.
- Turbott, H.B. (2012). "Primary care". In Elder, Chris (ed.). New Zealand's China experience : its genesis, triumphs, and occasional moments of less than complete success. Wellington [N.Z.]: Victoria University Press. pp. 55–58. ISBN 978-0-86473-837-0. OCLC 823121815.

Government offices
Preceded by John Cairney	Director-General of Health; 1959–1964	Succeeded by Doug Kennedy
