= Harry Turbott =

New Zealand architect and landscape architect

- Born: Harold Arthur Turbott; 16 December 1930
- Died: 4 March 2016 (aged 85)
- Education: Auckland University College; Harvard University
- Occupations: Architect, landscape architect
- Spouse: Gwyneth Nan Manchester (died 1978)
- Parent: Harold Turbott (father)
- Awards: NZIA 25-year award (1994)
- Buildings: Becroft house (1962–64)

Harold Arthur Turbott (16 December 1930 – 4 March 2016) was a New Zealand architect and landscape architect. He was the first New Zealander to gain a university degree in landscape architecture.

== Early life and education ==
Turbott was born on 16 December 1930, the son of doctor Harold Bertram Turbott and Eveline Lilian Turbott (née Arthur). His first job was as an office boy for the Auckland architectural practice, Gummer and Ford, and he subsequently studied architecture at Auckland University College, graduating in 1954. He was awarded a Fulbright scholarship and went to Harvard University, where he became the first New Zealander to complete a degree in landscape architecture—a Master of Landscape Architecture supervised by Hideo Sasaki. He then spent 16 months working for Dan Kiley on projects including the Independence Mall in Philadelphia, before returning to New Zealand in 1960.

== Career ==
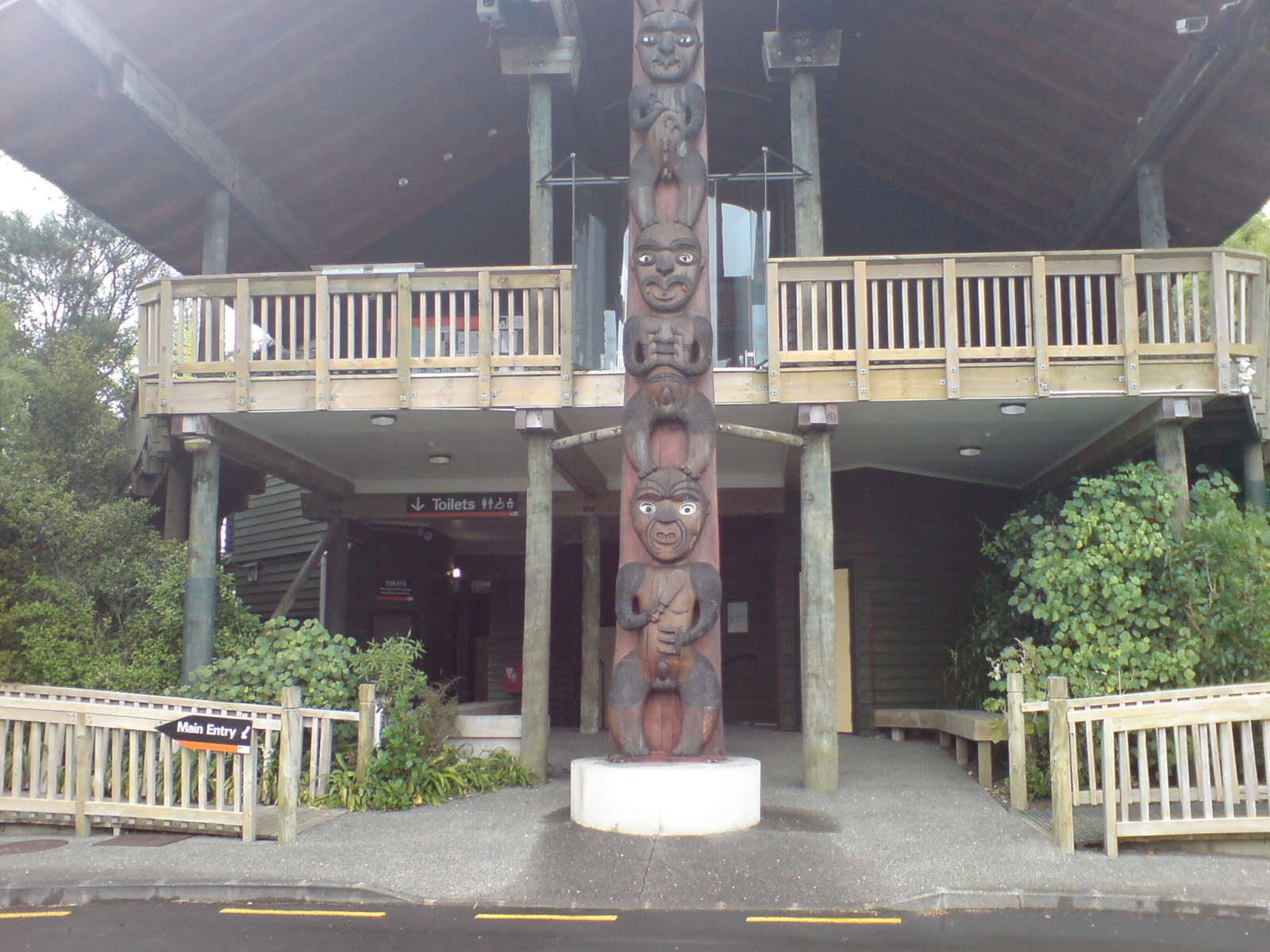
The Arataki Visitor Centre

Turbott practised as an architect and landscape architect, often combining the two disciplines in his projects. As an architect, Turbott is best known for the Becroft house (1962–64) in Takapuna, which he designed with Peter Middleton and won a New Zealand Institute of Architects (NZIA) bronze award in 1966 and an NZIA 25-year award in 1994, and the Arataki Visitor Centre, opened in 1994, in the Waitākere Ranges.

Turbott was associated with environmentalists Bill Ballantine and Roger Grace, and was a pioneer in the establishment of national coastal and marine reserves in New Zealand. He was in the vanguard of New Zealand landscape architects, introducing the discipline into projects such as motorways, waterfronts, parks and residential developments, including the Gisborne city and foreshore (1966), the Christchurch motorway, and the management plan for Maungawhau / Mount Eden Domain.

He also taught at the School of Architecture and Town Planning at the University of Auckland, and was involved in the establishment of the landscape architecture course at Unitec Institute of Technology in Auckland. In 1983–1984, he was a visiting professor in the Department of Landscape Architecture and Regional Planning at the University of Pennsylvania.

From 1989 to 1993 he supervised the restoration of the Para O Tane Palace in Rarotonga, Cook Islands.

== Death ==
Turbott died on 4 March 2016.
