= Laurie Stevens =

New Zealand industrialist

Sir Laurie Stevens CBE
- Born: Laurence Houghton Stevens; 9 January 1920; Auckland, New Zealand
- Died: 28 September 2006 (aged 86); Auckland, New Zealand
- Occupations: Accountant, managing director
- Spouse: Beryl Joyce Dickson (m. 1943)
- Children: 3

Sir Laurence Houghton Stevens CBE (9 January 1920 – 28 September 2006) was a New Zealand accountant and industrialist.

== Early life and family ==
Born in Auckland on 9 January 1920, Stevens was educated at Auckland Grammar School. He went on to study at Auckland University College, graduating with a Bachelor of Commerce in 1949, and qualify as a chartered accountant.

During World War II, Stevens served with the 2nd New Zealand Expeditionary Force in Italy and the Middle East. On 28 August 1943, he married Beryl Joyce Dickson at St Andrew's Church, Epsom, and the couple went on to have three children, including Court of Appeal judge and Queen's Counsel Lyn Stevens.

== Career ==
Stevens began working for Auckland Knitting Mills Limited in 1946, becoming secretary in 1948, manager in 1952 and managing director from 1962 until his retirement in 1980. He was active in various industry bodies, serving as president of the New Zealand Knitting Industries Federation from 1955 to 1960, president of the New Zealand Textile and Garment Manufacturers Federation between 1959 and 1960, and president of the New Zealand Manufacturers Federation from 1970 to 1971, and from 1981 to 1983.

Stevens held several directorships, including of the Reserve Bank of New Zealand. Lane Walker Rudkin, Auckland International Airport, Guardian Royal Exchange Assurance, Thorn EMI, Wormald, and Fay Richwhite.

A staunch advocate for free trade, Stevens helped to persuade New Zealand manufacturers to accept the New Zealand Australia Free Trade Agreement in 1965, and later was closely involved in negotiations leading to the Closer Economic Relations Trade Agreement between New Zealand and Australia in 1983.

== Other activities ==
While a student, Stevens represented Auckland University at tennis, and he later served as president of the Auckland Lawn Tennis Association between 1983 and 1984. He also served as chair of the Auckland Agricultural, Pastoral and Industrial Shows Board, and was a member of the Melanesian Mission Trust Board.

== Honours and awards ==
Stevens was awarded life membership of the New Zealand Textile and Garment Manufacturers Federation in 1977, and accorded the same honour by the New Zealand Knitting Industries Federation the following year.

In the 1979 New Year Honours, Stevens was appointed a Commander of the Order of the British Empire, for services to the textile industry, and in the 1983 Queen's Birthday Honours, he was made a Knight Bachelor, for services to the textile industry and export. He was inducted into the New Zealand Business Hall of Fame in 1999.

== Death ==
Stevens died on 28 September 2006, and his ashes were buried at Purewa Cemetery, in the Auckland suburb of Meadowbank. Beryl, Lady Stevens, died in 2010.
