= Ministry of Health (New Zealand) =

Government ministry of New Zealand

- Manatū Hauora (Māori)

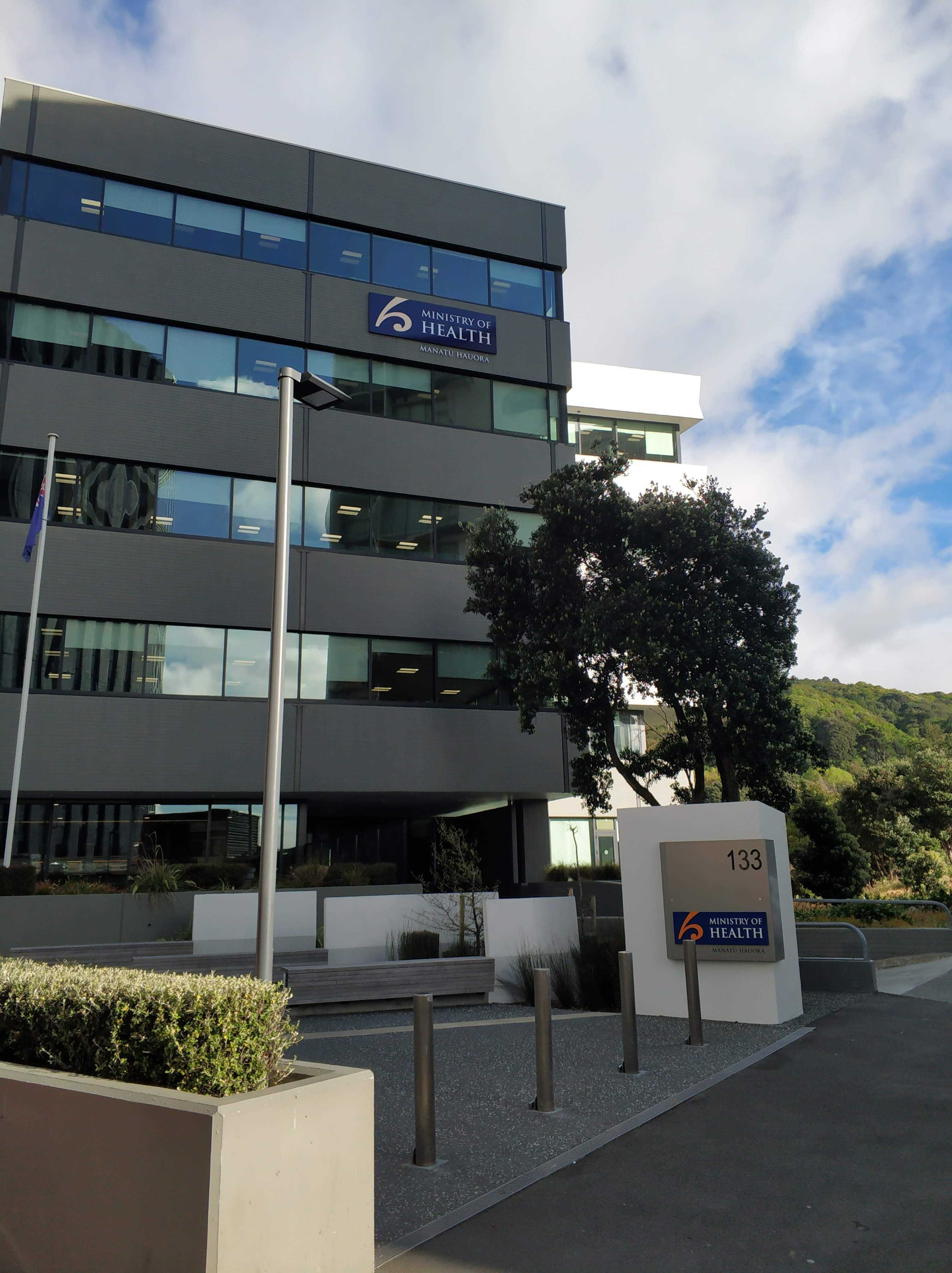
- 133 Molesworth Street, Ministry of Health NZ headquarters

Agency overview
- Formed: 1903
- Jurisdiction: New Zealand
- Headquarters: 133 Molesworth Street, Thorndon Wellington 6011
- Employees: 1,084 FTE staff
- Annual budget: Vote Health; Total budget for 2025/26 ▲$31,052,217,000
- Ministers responsible: Simeon Brown, Minister of Health; Hon David Seymour, Associate Minister of Health (Pharmac); Hon Matt Doocey, Associate Minister of Health; Hon Casey Costello, Associate Minister of Health
- Agency executive: Audrey Sonerson, Chief Executive and Director-General of Health
- Website: www.health.govt.nz

The Ministry of Health (Māori: Manatū Hauora) is the public service department of New Zealand responsible for healthcare in New Zealand. It came into existence in its current form in 1993. The organisation was founded in 1901 as the Department of Public Health in 1901, and was renamed to Department of Health in 1922.

== History ==
=== Origins ===
The Ministry of Health's origins can be traced back to the Department of Public Health, which was first established in 1901 at the advice of the Central Board of Health. The Department of Public Health assumed responsibility for the provision of Māori health services between 1906 and 1909, when Māori medical health services were returned to the-then Department of Native Affairs. In 1910, the Public Health Department resumed responsibility for the control of Māori health. In 1911, a Māori Nursing Service was established as part of the Department of Public Health.

=== Growing strains ===
Under the Health Act 1920, major organisational changes were mandated. Seven separate divisions were created within the department, each headed by its own director. The department was renamed the Department of Health in 1922, dropping the word public. The structure remained relatively static even when the Social Security Act 1938 was passed where the New Zealand government took a larger role in health purchasing. The department remained actively involved in policy (as opposed to purchasing).

In 1947 the department assumed responsibility for the administration and operation of psychiatric hospitals after the Mental Hospitals Department was abolished and became the division of mental hygiene at the department.

By the 1970s problems had appeared in the health system. The high growth rate in hospital expenditure was occurring at a time when the economy was slowing down. Thus, the government was unable to sustain funding this growth. This led the health system to undergo a series of changes over a 20-year period from the 1980s.

=== Fourth National Government, 1990–1999 ===
During the 1990s the Fourth National Government attempted to stream-line the system in a series of reforms such as separating the government purchasing and provision of health care services. Four regional health authorities (RHAs) were created to oversee the purchasing of health services while general practitioners, specialists, and hospitals were tasked with delivering health services. Public services were also turned into quasi-commercial Crown health enterprises (CHEs). In 1993, the department was renamed as the Ministry of Health.

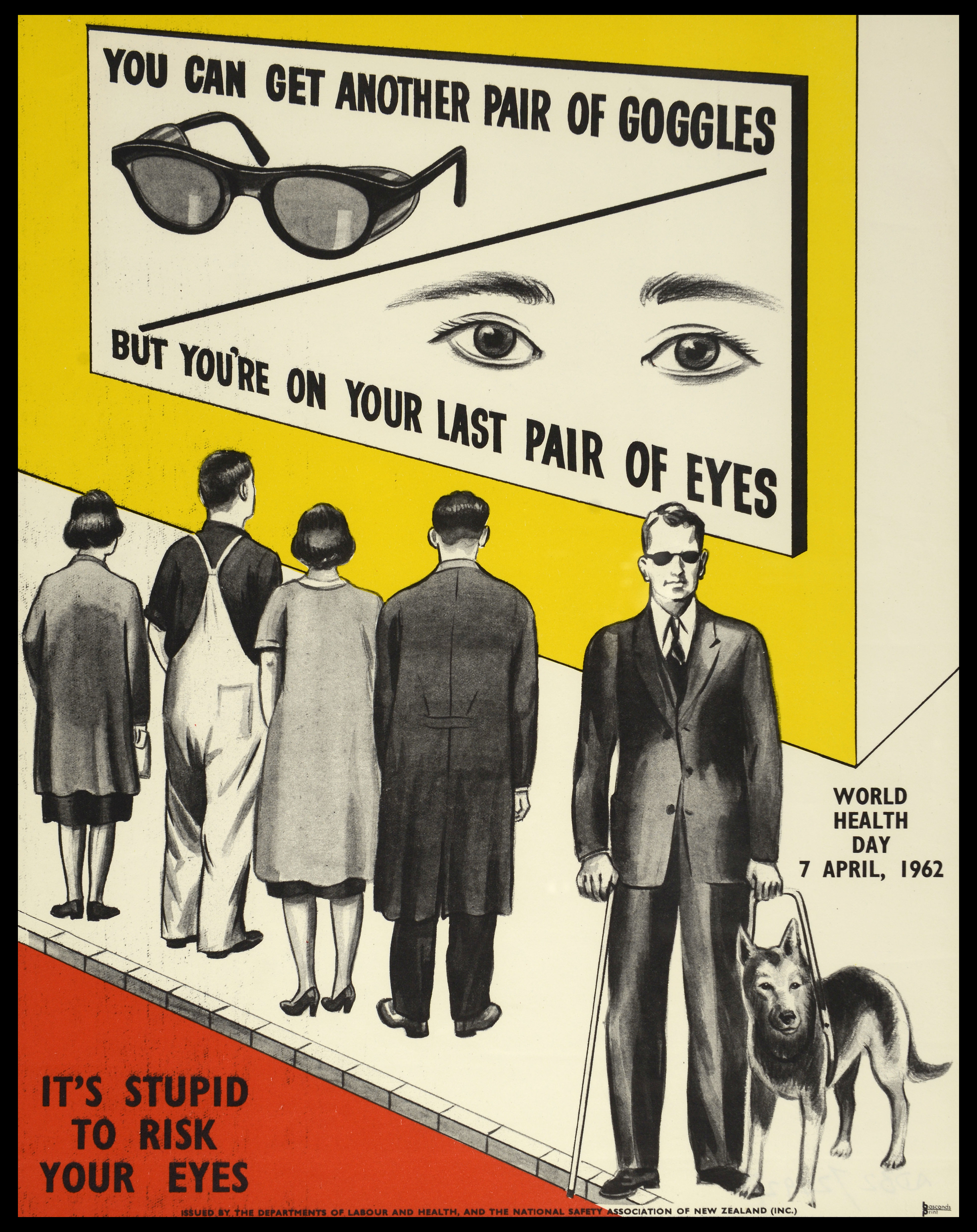
A poster produced by the Ministry of Health for 1962 World Health Day

=== Fifth Labour Government, 1999–2008 ===
The Labour–Alliance coalition government redefined the role of the Ministry of Health as part of Labour's election promises in the 1999 election.

In December 1999, the separate government health service purchasing entity, the Health Funding Authority, was merged with the Ministry of Health. Critics were anxious as to how the Ministry would perform as a funder, as they commented that the Ministry had in the past only performed as a policy organisation. However, supporters of this move stated that they believed this would make these agencies more accountable.

In February 2001, the Fifth Labour Government also launched the "New Zealand Primary Health Care Strategy" (PHCS) with the goal of improving public access to primary health care and reducing health inequalities. By 2008, the Primary Health Care Strategy had succeeded in reducing fees for doctors' and nurses' visits in "higher need areas" and for patients aged over 65 years. In addition, consultation rates increased across all age, socio-economic, and ethnic groups in New Zealand.

As part of the PHCS programme, the government encouraged the development of Primary Health Organisations (PHOs) to provide some primary health care services at the local level and to transition health care services from fee-for-service arrangements to capitation funding for health professionals who are members of these organisations. By early April 2003, 34 PHOs had been established throughout New Zealand.

In addition, the Fifth Labour Government established District health board (DHBs) in 2001 as subsidiary organisations of the Health Ministry. They were responsible for providing and funding health services within a defined geographical area. At the time of their dissolution in July 2022, there were twenty DHBs. They were also responsible for running hospitals and funding some health provisions in their respective areas. Funding for these DHBs was allocated according to the Ministry's population-based funding formula.

=== Sixth Labour Government, 2017–2023 ===
In 2018, the government launched the He Ara Oranga inquiry into mental health and addiction. In 2021, this resulted in the creation of Te Hiringa Mahara, an independent Crown entity that promotes mental health and wellbeing.

On 10 September 2019, Prime Minister Jacinda Ardern and Health Minister David Clark announced the establishment of a Suicide Prevention Office within the Health Ministry to address the country's suicide rate. Key changes include shifting from a mental health service model to a community-based one and supporting people bereaved by suicide. There were also plans to later establish the Suicide Prevention Office as a separate standalone government service but these were never enacted.

The Ministry of Health was the agency responsible for the New Zealand government response to the COVID-19 pandemic.

In April 2021, the Sixth Labour Government announced that DHB system would be abolished and replaced by three new entities: a centralised agency called Health New Zealand, a Māori Health Authority (MHA) to fund Māori health services, and a Public Health Agency to centralise public health work.

In October 2021, the government introduced a parliamentary bill called the Pae Ora (Healthy Futures) Bill, which created the new public health entities and strengthened the Health Ministry's stewardship role. This bill passed into law on 7 June 2022. On 1 July, the Pae Ora (Health Futures) Act came into effect; with Health New Zealand, the MHA, and the Health Ministry's Public Health Agency assuming the district health boards' former provision of healthcare services.

=== Sixth National Government, 2023–present ===
In March 2024, the Health Ministry proposed slashing 180 jobs following a cost-saving directive from the National-led coalition government. In early April 2024, the Public Service Association expressed concerns that proposed job cuts at the Health Ministry would lead to the closure of the Suicide Prevention Office and other specialist roles. The PSA's statement was disputed by the Minister for Mental Health Matt Doocey, who said he had not been briefed about the closure of the Suicide Prevention Office. Doocey said he had spoken with the Director-General of Health to ensure the Office would remain open. Doocey reiterated that mental health and suicide prevention remained a priority for the New Zealand Government.

== Criticism and Controversies ==
During the COVID-19 pandemic, the Ministry of Health faced criticism over data transparency and its approach to equity. Public health experts and Māori leaders raised concerns that the Ministry failed to adequately prioritise Māori health providers during the vaccine rollout. The Waitangi Tribunal concluded in 2021 that the Crown had breached Te Tiriti o Waitangi by undermining Māori authority (tino rangatiratanga) and not providing timely support for Māori-led initiatives. Additionally, inconsistent communication of COVID-19 testing, isolation rules, and traffic light systems drew widespread public and media criticism for creating confusion and undermining trust.

In 2023–2024, controversy intensified around Health New Zealand (Te Whatu Ora), a national health delivery agency created under reforms led by the Ministry. Internal documents revealed significant dysfunction within the Health NZ board prior to its dismissal by the government in 2023. Subsequently, the agency initiated a $275 million system restructure, including $19 million paid to external consultants. The scale of these expenditures drew criticism from opposition parties and public watchdogs, including the New Zealand Taxpayers’ Union, who questioned both fiscal transparency and value for money. A further source of concern arose when Health NZ proposed job cuts within its fraud recovery team — a group responsible for reclaiming millions in misspent or fraudulent health payments. Critics warned that eliminating such roles would compromise the agency's ability to recover funds and highlighted ongoing tensions between cost-cutting and service integrity. These developments prompted scrutiny not only of Health NZ's operational priorities, but also of the Ministry's broader oversight responsibilities and strategic leadership under the reformed health system.

== Structure ==
=== Senior leadership ===
- Director-General of Health and Chief Executive
  - Chief Financial Officer
  - Deputy Director-General, Strategy and Policy
  - Deputy Director-General, Regulatory Services
  - Deputy Director-General, Performance and Governance
  - Deputy Director-General, Public Health Agency
  - Deputy Director-General, Māori Health
  - Deputy Director-General, Corporate Services

=== Other business units and Crown agents ===
Medsafe is the business unit of the Ministry responsible for medical regulatory functions.

The former National Health Board (NHB), which was set up in November 2009, dealt with issues such as rising costs, increased demand, an ageing population and shortages of staff with a view to improving the quality, safety and sustainability of health care.

Health New Zealand is a separate Crown agent responsible for the planning and commissioning of health services, superseding the previous system of district health boards. Te Aka Whai Ora, the Māori Health Authority was disestablished in 2024. The Ministry is the Crown monitor of these Crown agents.

The Office of Radiation Safety regulates the use of radioactive materials and operates the National Radiation Storage Facility.

=== List of directors-general ===
Directors-General of Health (Chief Executive) are:

No.	Name	Portrait	Term of office	
1	James Mason		December 1900	June 1909
2	Thomas Valintine		June 1909	December 1930
3	Michael Watt		December 1930	March 1947
4	Thomas Ritchie		March 1947	February 1950
5	John Cairney		February 1950	October 1959
6	Harold Turbott		October 1959	December 1964
7	Doug Kennedy		January 1965	December 1972
8	John Hiddlestone		January 1973	March 1983
9	Ron Baker		April 1983	March 1986
10	George Salmond		March 1986	May 1991
-	Ian Miller (acting)		May 1991	January 1992
11	Chris Lovelace		January 1992	June 1995
12	Karen Poutasi		June 1995	July 2006
13	Stephen McKernan		July 2006	July 2010
-	Andrew Bridgman (acting)		July 2010	January 2011
14	Kevin Woods		January 2011	January 2013
15	Chai Chuah		March 2015	February 2018
(13)	Stephen McKernan (acting)		February 2018	June 2018
16	Ashley Bloomfield		June 2018	July 2022
17	Diana Sarfati (acting from 2 July to 1 December)		July 2022	February 2025
18	Audrey Sonerson (acting from 21 February to 7 April)		February 2025	present

== Ministers ==
The Ministry serves 2 portfolio and 4 ministers.

Officeholder	Portfolios	Other responsibilities
Hon Simeon Brown	Lead Minister (Ministry of Health); Minister of Health	
Hon Matt Doocey	Minister for Mental Health	Associate Minister of Health
Hon David Seymour		Associate Minister of Health (Pharmac)
Hon Casey Costello		Associate Minister of Health

== Sources ==
- James, Colin (2017). National at 80: The Story of the New Zealand National Party. Auckland: David Bateman Ltd. ISBN 9781869539818.
