= Margaret Mutu =

Ngāti Kahu leader, author and academic

Margaret Mutu FRSNZ
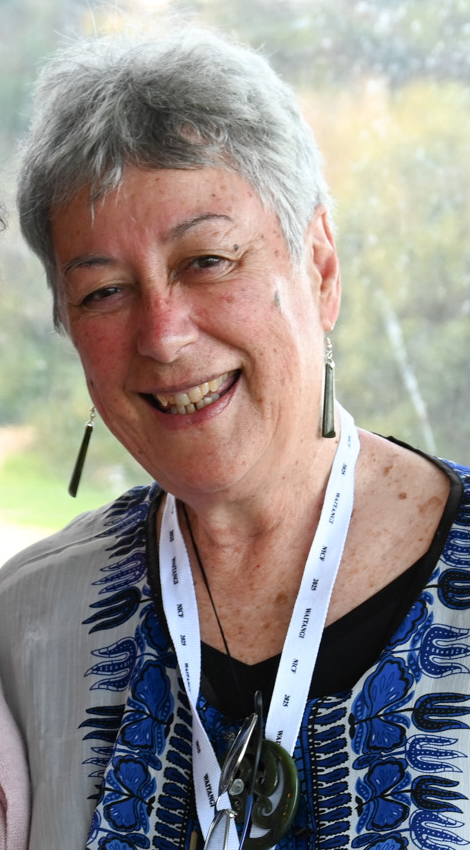
- Mutu in 2025
- Born: Auckland, New Zealand

Academic background
- Doctoral advisor: Bruce Biggs

Academic work
- Institutions: University of Auckland

Margaret Shirley Mutu is a Ngāti Kahu leader, author and academic from Karikari, New Zealand and works at the University of Auckland, New Zealand. She is Māori and her iwi (tribes) are Ngāti Kahu, Te Rarawa and Ngāti Whātua.

== Biography and education ==
Margaret Mutu was born in Auckland. Her father Tame (Tom) Mutu was Māori affiliating with Ngāti Kahu, Te Rarawa and Ngāti Whātua, all iwi from the Northland Region of New Zealand. He was brought up in the Northern Wairoa outside Dargaville and was an orthopedic technician. Her mother Penelope Brough-Robertson was Pākehā of Scottish descent and was a nurse at National Women's Hospital. The schools Margaret attended whilst growing up in Mount Roskill, Auckland were Waikowhai Primary School and Mt Roskill Intermediate. After her father died, she went to school in New Plymouth, at New Plymouth Girls’ High boarding at the Rangiātea Methodist Māori Girls hostel.

Margaret Mutu obtained a BSc in Mathematics, a MPhil in Māori Studies, a PhD in Māori Studies from the University of Auckland specialising in linguistics. Her doctoral thesis was titled Aspects of the structure of the Ùa Pou dialect of the Marquesan language.. Mutu is a Fellow of the Royal Society of New Zealand elected in 2017.

== Career ==
Margaret Mutu is the Professor of Māori Studies at the University of Auckland. She has taught Māori language and Treaty of Waitangi courses since 1986.

Margaret Mutu holds a number of chairperson roles including of the Te Rūnanga-ā-Iwi o Ngāti Kahu (the council of representatives, or parliament, of the Ngāti Kahu iwi or nation), Ngāti Kahu's head claimant and chief negotiator for treaty claims settlements, and spokesperson to the media, a member of National Iwi Chairs' Forum (representing Ngāti Kahu). She is chairperson of Matike Mai Aotearoa: The Independent Working Group on Constitutional Transformation, convened by Moana Jackson, and chairperson of the Aotearoa Independent Monitoring Mechanism which monitors New Zealand's compliance with the United Nations Declaration on the Rights of Indigenous Peoples. She is the chairperson of Karikari marae and of Kapehu marae (in the Northern Wairoa).

Memberships of committees and boards include the New Zealand Conservation Authority, the board of the National Institute of Water and Atmospheric Research (NIWA), the Board of Enquiry into the New Zealand Coastal Policy Statement and a technical committee of the United Nations Convention on Biodiversity. From 2009 to 2015 Mutu was a member the editorial board of AlterNative - A Journal of Indigenous Scholarship.

== Honours and awards ==
In 2015, the Royal Society of New Zealand awarded Mutu the Pou Aronui Award "for her sustained contributions to indigenous rights and scholarship".

In 2017, Mutu was selected as one of the Royal Society Te Apārangi's "150 women in 150 words", celebrating the contributions of women to knowledge in New Zealand.

== Bibliography ==
=== Books ===
- Mutu, Margaret. 2026. The State of Māori Rights (Revised Edition). Wellington, Huia Publishers. ISBN 978-1-77550-839-7
- Mutu, Margaret, Lloyd Pōpata, Te Kani Williams, Ānahera Herbert-Graves, Reremoana Rēnata, JudyAnn Cooze, Zarah Pineaha, Tania Thomas, Te Ikanui Kingi-Waiaua, Te Rūnanga-ā-Iwi o Ngāti Kahu and Wackrow, Williams and Davies Ltd. 2017. Ngāti Kahu: Portrait of a Sovereign Nation. Wellington, Huia Publishers. ISBN 978-1-77550-304-0
- Mutu, Margaret, 2011. The State of Māori Rights. Wellington, Huia Publishers. ISBN 978-1-86969-437-1
- Mutu, Margaret and McCully Matiu. 2003. Te Whānau Moana – Ngā kaupapa me ngā tikanga – Customs and protocols. Auckland, Reed Publishing. ISBN 0790008394
- Mutu, Margaret. 2002. Ūa Pou: Aspects of a Marquesan dialect. Canberra: Pacific Linguistics. ISBN 0858835266

=== Journal articles ===
- Mutu, Margaret. 2019. ‘The Treaty Claims Settlement Process in New Zealand and its Impact on Māori’ in Land 8 (10) Special Issue: Land Restitution: Processes and Outcomes in Different Political and Socio-Cultural Contexts
- Mutu, Margaret. 2019. ‘“To Honour the Treaty, We Must First Settle Colonisation” (Moana Jackson 2015): The Long Road from Colonial Devastation to Peace, Balance and Harmony’ in Journal of the Royal Society of New Zealand Tuia250 supplement. pp.1-15. Available on https://doi.org/10.1080/03036758.2019.1669670
- Mutu, Margaret, 2018. "Behind the Smoke and Mirrors of the Treaty of Waitangi Claims Settlement Process in New Zealand: No Prospect for Justice and Reconciliation for Māori without Constitutional Transformation” in Journal of Global Ethics Vol.14:2. ISSN 1744-9626
- Mutu, Margaret, 2014. "Indigenizing the University of Auckland" in Canadian Journal of Native Education: Indigenizing the International Academy. Vol. 37, No. 1, pp. 63–85, Vancouver, University of British Columbia. ISSN 0710-1481
- Abel, Sue and Margaret Mutu, 2011. "There's Racism and then There's Racism – Margaret Mutu and the Racism Debate", in The New Zealand Journal of Media Studies, Vol. 12, No. 2, pp.1–19.
- Mutu, Margaret. 2009. "The Role of History and Oral Traditions in the Recovery of Fagin’s Ill-gotten Gains: Settling Ngāti Kahu’s Claims against the Crown" in Te Pouhere Kōrero Journal: Māori History, Māori People, pp. 23–44.
- Mutu, Margaret. 2005. “In Search of the Missing Māori Links – Maintaining both ethnic identity and linguistic integrity in the revitalization of the Māori language” in the International Journal of the Sociology of Language. Vol. 172, pp. 117–132. New York, Mouton.

=== Book chapters ===
- Mutu, Margaret. 2024. ‘The Humpty Dumpty mistranslation and misrepresentation deployed in the British colonization of Aotearoa/New Zealand’ in Kathleen C. Riley, Bernard C. Perley and Inmaculada M. García-Sánchez (eds), Language and Social Justice: Global Perspectives. Bloomsbury Publishers. Pp. 137-157.
- Mutu, Margaret. 2023. ‘Riro Whenua Atu, Hoki Whenua Mai: Land Grabbing in British settler states and Contested Land Restitution to Māori in Aotearoa New Zealand’ in Andreas Neef, Sharleen Mollett, Tsegaye Moreda and Chanrith Ngin (eds), Routledge Handbook of Global Land and Resource Grabbing. Routledge. Pp. 33-46.
- Mutu, Margaret. 2022. ‘Environmental ideas in Aotearoa’ in Maria Bargh and Julie MacArthur (eds), Environmental Politics and Policy in Aotearoa New Zealand. Auckland, Auckland University Press. pp. 49-66
- Mutu, Margaret. 2021. ‘Mana Māori Motuhake: Māori Concepts and Practices of Sovereignty’ in Aileen Moreton-Robinson, Brendan Hokowhitu, Linda Tuhiwai Smith, Steve Larkin and Chris Andersen (eds) The Routledge Handbook of Critical Indigenous Studies. Routledge. pp.269-280
- Mutu, Margaret, 2020, ‘Behind the smoke and mirrors of the Treaty of Waitangi claims settlement process in New Zealand: no prospect for justice and reconciliation for Māori without constitutional transformation’ in Krushil Watene and Eric Palmer (eds), Reconciliation, Transitional and Indigenous Justice, Routlege, https://doi.org/10.4324/9781003035268
- Mutu, Margaret. 2020. ‘Māori of New Zealand’ in Sharlotte Neely and Douglas Hume (eds) Native Nations: The Survival of Indigenous Peoples, 3rd edition. Vernon, British Columbia, Canada, JCharlton Publishing. pp. 87-114.
- Mutu, Margaret. 2017. "Māori of New Zealand" in Sharlotte Neely (ed), Native Nations: The Survival of Fourth World Peoples (2nd edn), Vernon, British Columbia, Canada, JCharlton Publishing. pp 87–113. ISBN 978-1-926476-17-9
- Mutu, Margaret. 2015. "Unravelling Colonial Weaving", in Paul Little and Wendyl Nissen (eds), Stroppy Old Women. Auckland, Paul Little Books. pp. 165–178. ISBN 978-0-473-25860-3
- Mutu, Margaret. 2012. "Custom Law and the Advent of New Pākehā Settlers: Tuku Whenua Allocation of Resource Use Rights" in Danny Keenan (ed.) Huia Histories of Māori: Ngā Tāhuhu Kōrero. Wellington, Huia. pp. 93-108. ISBN 978-1-77550-009-4
- Mutu, Margaret. 2012. "Fisheries Settlement: The Sea I Never Gave", in Janine Hayward and Nicola Wheen (eds), Treaty of Waitangi Settlements. Wellington, Bridget Williams Books, pp. 114–123. ISBN 978-1-927131-38-1
- Mutu, Margaret. 2010. "Constitutional Intentions: The Treaty Text" in Mulholland, Malcolm and Veronica Tāwahi (eds). Weeping Waters. Wellington, Huia. pp 13–40. ISBN 9781869694043
- Mutu, Margaret. 2010. "Ngāti Kahu Kaitiakitanga" in Malcolm Mulholland, Rachel Selby, Pataka Moore (eds). Māori and the Environment. Wellington, Huia. pp 13–36. ISBN 9781869694029
- Mutu, Margaret. 2009. "Māori Media Depiction of Chinese: From Despised and Feared to Cultural and Political Allies" in Manying Ip (ed), The Dragon and the Taniwha. Auckland, Auckland University Press. ISBN 9781869404369
- Mutu, Margaret. 2006. "Recovering and Developing Ngāti Kahu's Prosperity" in Malcolm Mulholland (ed), State of the Māori Nation. Auckland, Reed Publishing. ISBN 9780790010427
- Mutu, Margaret. 2004. "The Humpty Dumpty principle at work: The role of mistranslation in the British settlement of Aotearoa: The Declaration of Independence and He wakaputanga o te Rangatiratanga o nga hapu o Nu Tireni" in Sabine Fenton (ed), For better or for worse: Translation as a tool for change in the South Pacific. Manchester, England, St Jerome Publishing. ISBN 978-1-900650-67-0
- Mutu, Margaret. 2004. "Recovering Fagin's Ill-gotten Gains: Settling Ngāti Kahu's Treaty of Waitangi Claims against the Crown" in Michael Belgrave, David Williams and Merata Kāwharu (eds), Waitangi Revisited: Perspectives on the Treaty of Waitangi. Melbourne, Australia, Oxford University Press. ISBN 9780195584004
- Mutu, Margaret. 2004. "Researching the Pacific" in Tupeni Baba, 'Okusitino Mahina, Nuhisifa Williams and Unaisi Nabobo-Baba (eds). Researching the Pacific and Indigenous Peoples. Auckland, Centre for Pacific Studies, The University of Auckland. ISBN 0908959079
- Mutu, Margaret. 2002. "Barriers to tangata whenua participation in resource management" in Merata Kāwharu (ed), Whenua: Managing our resources. Auckland, Reed Publishing. ISBN 9780790008585

=== Report ===
- Matike Mai Aotearoa, 2016. He Whakaaro Here Whakaumu Mō Aotearoa: The Report of Matike Mai Aotearoa – The Independent Working Group on Constitutional Transformation. Auckland, University of Auckland and National Iwi Chairs Forum. 125 pages. https://nwo.org.nz/resources/report-of-matike-mai-aotearoa-the-independent-working-group-on-constitutional-transformation/
