= Danny Keenan =

New Zealand historian and author

- Born: New Plymouth, New Zealand
- Citizenship: New Zealand
- Occupations: Author and historian
- Awards: Fulbright Senior Scholar Award (2009); Ngā Kupu Ora Māori Book Award (2015)

Academic background
- Education: Massey University, New Zealand

Academic work
- Notable works: Te Whiti o Rongomai and the Resistance of Parihaka (2015) ISBN 9781775501954; Wars Without End: New Zealand's Land Wars - A Maori Perspective (2021) ISBN 9780143774938

Danny Keenan is a New Zealand historian and author who writes from a whakapapa Māori perspective on the history of New Zealand. He affiliates to the Māori nation of Ngāti Te Whiti ki Te Atiawa.

== Biography ==
Keenan was born in New Plymouth, a city in Taranaki in the North Island of New Zealand. He is Māori of Ngāti Te Whiti ki Te Atiawa descent. When he was a child his father was active at the marae in Parihaka, and one of his ancestors is Meretatana Te Keha.

Kennan as a child went to Pungarehu Primary School and then on to New Plymouth Boys’ High School.

After his undergraduate degree from Massey University, Keenan got a job with the Department of Maori Affairs from 1981 to 1989 until the department was disestablished. He then went back to university and in 1994 he completed a PhD in history at Massey University. His doctorate was titled Haere whakamua, hoki whakamuri, going forward, thinking back : tribal and hapū perspectives of the past in 19th century Taranaki.

Keenan is a founding member of Te Pouhere Kōrero a society focusing on Māori history that started in 1992. Others who were involved included Te Ahukaramū Charles Royal, Aroha Harris, Buddy Mikaere and Dr Miria Simpson.

He got a job at Massey University in 2004 as a senior lecturer, he is currently no longer teaching but writing full-time. In 2009, his book 'Wars Without End', covering the New Zealand Wars, was published by Penguin New Zealand. This became the subject of litigation when it was found Keenan had plagiarised portions of Nigel Prickett's 2002 book 'Landscapes of Conflict'. The dispute resulted in 'Wars Without End' being recalled, revised and then republished without the offending material.

In 2023 Keenan received the Creative New Zealand Michael King Writer's Fellowship to write a book currently called, In Sickness and In Health a Cultural History of Three Māori Pandemics 1895-2021.

In 2023 Keenan's next writing project is an historical analysis of three pandemics that have egregiously affected Māori. The study will illuminate Māori response to these events, including how they mobilised communities, grounded by mātauranga Māori frameworks. (Arihia McClutchie, Creative New Zealand 31 Mar 2023)

== Works ==
Keenan in a 2023 interview states his philosophy as a writer of history is to focus on his own family lineage, to 'write about your own'.

In 2023, Keenan will publish his ninth book.

=== Book author ===
- Wars Without End: New Zealand's Land Wars - A Maori Perspective (2009)
- Te Whiti o Rongomai and the Resistance of Parihaka (2015) ISBN 9781775501954
- Wars Without End: New Zealand's Land Wars - A Maori Perspective (2021) - revised edition - ISBN 9780143774938
- Fate of the Land Ko Ngā Ākinga a ngā Rangatira (Massey Press)
- A History of the Māori Trust Boards 1922-2022 (Huia)
- Ahuwhenua. Celebrating 90 Years of Māori Farming (Huia)

=== Book editor ===
- Huia histories of Māori : ngā tāhuhu kōrero (2012) ISBN 9781775500094

== Awards ==
- Fulbright Postdoctoral Award (1995) to study in the Centre for the History of the American Indian at the Newberry Library, Chicago.
- Fulbright Senior Scholar Award (2009) to teach New Zealand history at Georgetown University, Washington DC.
- Ngā Kupu Ora Māori Book Award (2015) for the book Te Whiti O Rongomai and the Resistance of Parihaka
- Michael King Writer's Fellowship (2023)
