= The New Zealand Wars / Ngā Pakanga o Aotearoa =

Book by Vincent O'Malley

- Author: Vincent O'Malley
- Genre: History
- Publisher: Bridget Williams Books Ltd
- Publication date: May 2019
- Pages: 272
- ISBN: 9781988545998
- Website: https://www.bwb.co.nz/books/new-zealand-wars/

The New Zealand Wars / Ngā Pakanga o Aotearoa is a book by historian Vincent O'Malley that documents the New Zealand Wars, a series of conflicts in the country, which involved the Crown and some groups of Māori between 1845 and 1872. Published in 2019 the book is generally accepted as contributing to an increased public awareness of the significance of the wars in shaping New Zealand society and pressure to recognise and teach the history of them in the country's schools. It has been nominated for several literary awards and was acknowledged when O'Malley won the Prime Minister's Award for Literary Achievement in 2022.

== Background and context ==
During an interview on Radio New Zealand, in response to the question of why it has taken so long for a book such as this to be written, O'Malley claimed that the New Zealand Wars had been largely forgotten, with some degree of "myth making" that the wars had shaped excellent race relations, and there was some celebration of them by Pākehā. He holds that this had changed by the 1970s when there was "an uncomfortable silence about the wars" with some strong reactions to writers such as James Belich, and by 2019 it was being more accepted that there needed to be a revisiting to the wars in the way history is taught in the country and how sites of conflict are commemorated.

In 2016, following the presentation of a petition to the parliament by a group of high school students from Otorohanga College, the New Zealand government agreed that there would be an annual day of commemoration of the wars. The petition by the students and the recognition by the government are seen by O'Malley as being significant enough to include them in the book in a timeline of events of relevance to the New Zealand Wars. There was also public debate about the teaching of New Zealand's history in the country's schools and despite some resistance to this, following another petition, this time from the New Zealand History Teachers' Association, Jacinda Ardern announced in 2019 the intention for New Zealand history to be compulsory in all schools by 2022.

O'Malley has acknowledged the significance of the day of commemoration of the victims of the New Zealand Wars and the increased focus on teaching the country's history in a revised curriculum and co-authored another article which holds that there is a "greater willingness to face up to the bitter and bloody realities of these conflicts...[and]... to introduce local histories and studies of these conflicts into the school curriculum".

One reviewer suggests that the publication of the book in May 2019, was [one of] "a number of catalysts" that precipitated the announcement on 12 September by Ardern that by 2022, all New Zealand schools "would be required to teach key aspects of the country's history, including the New Zealand Wars". In 2019, Jack Tame noted that while the New Zealand curriculum at the time "allowed for flexibility" about what children were taught, there was some call for it to be more specific, in particular with regard to learning about the country's history. Tame introduces The New Zealand Wars / Ngā Pakanga o Aotearoa as a "resource for students" created by Vincent O'Malley to address this. In the interview, O'Malley notes that the teaching about the New Zealand Wars is seen as a "contentious and potentially divisive" and some schools can avoid the topic because of the structure of the curriculum in 2019. Comparing the book to his previous work, The Great War for New Zealand, O'Malley claimed it was more "accessible...[suggesting]...New Zealand had turned a corner in addressing its bloody history". In the same article, O'Malley said he hoped the book would be used as a resource to "kickstart the process" of getting some clear direction from the Ministry of Education to support schools in managing this.

== Format and key ideas ==
The Introduction begins and ends with the central premise of the book: The New Zealand Wars need to be acknowledged, understood and remembered in terms of how they shape the country's history and development as a nation. O'Malley suggests this requires New Zealanders "to openly and honesty confront and take ownership of [their] past, not just cherry-picking the good things but remembering the darker episodes as well". This section of the book provides an overview of the various combatants in the conflicts. It is noted that a range of Crown defence forces, including conscripted troops, militia and volunteers, were supported by various groups of Māori with their own interests. In contrast, the Māori opposition were from a wide range of iwi and hapū, had no organised "standing army" or "effective artillery" and "an absence of formalised command structures, made it necessary to coordinate efforts through discussion and consensus rather than the issuing of orders from above". Most Māori who participated in the fighting were male with a few wāhine toa (female fighters), but in general women and children were vulnerable when the forces of the Crown attacked what were often "open and undefended villages rather than fortified positions". The "Introduction" does offer some analysis of the causes of the wars with one reviewer noting: "If there is a central theme to The New Zealand Wars: Ngā Pakanga o Aotearoa, it is that the wars came about due to settlers' hunger for land and the government's determination to impose its sovereignty in the face of Māori resolve to maintain rangatiratanga. There is little doubt that these conflicts would not have occurred without settler colonialism. It is no longer acceptable to justify the wars on the basis of a colonial predestination, native savagery, or chivalrous contest." Another writer notes that the book records how this manifested as a major conflict of understanding of the Treaty of Waitangi, and therefore, "that the wars began in 1844, when Māori iwi in the North and South Island realized that the settlers (Pākehā) held a very different interpretation of Māori landownership and sovereignty as set out in the treaty". The final section in the Introduction considers the changing historiography and introduces the debate that resulted in the acceptance by historians of the term New Zealand Wars for the conflicts.

Subsequent chapters recount the details of how the War started and progressed in different areas of New Zealand. Grouped into sections mostly geographically with some sequential and chronological, these include The Northern Wars 1845–46, Central New Zealand: Wairau, Wellington, and Whanganui, The first Taranaki War 1860–61 and the second from 1863 to 1864, The Waikato War 1863–64, The War at Tauranga, Pai Mārire and the West Coast campaigns 1864–66, The East Coast Wars 1865–66, Tītokowaru's Campaign 1868–69, and the pursuit of Te Kooti 1868–72.

The final chapter, After the War, unpacks the legacies of the New Zealand Wars and how the understanding of these remains relevant. It has been written that O'Malley uses this section of the book to reflect on the New Zealand Wars being "remembered and forgotten, and how these conflicts are being commemorated". There is recognition of the disproportionate loss of life by Māori who fought the colonial forces and the adverse economic affect the wars had on many Māori communities. The resolution of issues resulting from the policy and practice of land confiscation (raupatu) by the Crown is central to this chapter. O'Malley holds that the wars consolidated government control of the country by winning "the battle between two competing ideas of what the Treaty of Waitangi stood for...[with the Crown's version envisioning]...a treaty of cession and unbridled sovereignty, not mutual partnership and dialogue". Various initiatives to redress the land issues are set in historical context which ultimately led in the 1970s to the rise of groups such as Ngā Tamatoa which challenged the government to acknowledge the Treaty of Waitangi had not been honoured, the Māori land march led by Whina Cooper and the passing of the Treaty of Waitangi Act which established the Waitangi Tribunal to investigate claims of the Treaty not being kept. The final chapter makes the case that while these movements and changes "all but discredited the established Pākehā interpretation of the past...[and]...it was no longer acceptable to 'celebrate' the New Zealand Wars" there remained a need for a new narrative about the Wars to overcome what is termed "uncomfortable silences" on the subject. The position of the book is that the movements by young people resulting in a national day of commemoration of the Wars and the focus on a new history curriculum are "examples of how this history resonates over generations but also of how resistance, sometimes modelled on past efforts but looking toward the future endures...[concluding]...the story of the New Zealand Wars remains an evolving one, and future generations will have their own stories to tell".

== Reception ==
One review claims the book addresses what was previously a "highly romanticized version of these conflicts" and with detailed examination of the complex motivations of all parties involved in the wars, is able to offer evidence of the consequences for New Zealand that need to be understood in the 21st century, including the steps that have been taken to redress issues such as land confiscation. Key players in the conflicts are said to be introduced by O'Malley in a manner that brings the history to "life" and the reviewer holds that the book clearly states O'Malley's position on the importance of the conflicts being remembered and appropriately commemorated. The work has been said to "highlight events at significant variance with the sanitised, even romanticised, history still mostly accepted by the dominant culture...[and]...comprises another forward step in establishing a truthful & accurate history of the founding years of our nation". Situated by another commentator as being key in supporting the teaching of history in New Zealand schools, the book is [described as] "very readable, with fine half-page illustrations – photographs taken of those of the times, both historic and recent artwork, and maps of conflict areas. Class sets should be mandatory in New Zealand schools".

Historian Jock Phillips identifies how recent research carried out for the Waitangi Tribunal is cited by O'Malley [and] "significantly informs the discussion of the origins of particular conflicts", and Gregor Fountain, former Principal of Wellington College hopes that the book will "encourage students and teachers to get out of their classrooms, visit the sites where events took place, and explore them for themselves". On the same website, journalist Mihingarangi Forbes endorses the book as "an important body of work...a narrative which carefully weaves both the accounts of the British Colonial government with those of hapū rangatira...[and]...while not all New Zealanders are ready to confront our past, this work will serve as a taonga for future generations". An Australian reviewer notes that O'Malley writes with "integrity and compassion...[and]...demonstrates complete mastery of the complex issues that have defeated others before him and understands the importance of the wars to New Zealand today".

== Recognition and awards ==
When O'Malley was awarded the Prime Minister's Award for Literary Achievement in 2022, The New Zealand Wars / Nga Pakanga o Aotearoa was recognised as one of the key books he had written about the country's history, [noting it]..."provides a highly accessible introduction to the causes, events and consequences of the New Zealand Wars".

The book was longlisted for the Ockham New Zealand Book Awards - General Non-Fiction Award 2020, selected by the New Zealand Listener as one of the best books of 2019, and shortlisted for the Nonfiction Book Award at the New Zealand Heritage Book & Writing Awards 2019.
