= Vera Hayward =

Teacher in New Zealand, MBE

Vera Hayward MBE
- Born: Vera Annie Hayward; 8 March 1902; Dunedin, New Zealand
- Died: 12 November 1999 (aged 97); Dunedin, New Zealand
- Resting place: Andersons Bay Cemetery
- Education: University of Otago
- Relatives: Janine Hayward (great niece)
- Awards: Queen Elizabeth II Coronation Medal

Vera Annie Hayward MBE (8 March 1902 – 12 November 1999) was a New Zealand teacher. She was one of New Zealand's first visiting teachers, and was the second woman to serve president of the New Zealand Educational Institute. Hayward was instrumental in setting up the New Zealand Kindergarten Teachers' Association, and was active in many community, education and civic organisations. In 1956, she was appointed a Member of the Order of the British Empire, for services rendered in connection with educational and women's organisations.

== Early life and teaching career ==
Hayward was born in Dunedin on 8 March 1902, the eldest of four children of Annie and William Rowland Hayward, a businessman. Her paternal grandfather was a captain on trading vessels to New Zealand, and an early settler in Dunedin, arriving in 1849. She described her parents as very well-read, even though they had not attended secondary school, and they made sure all four of their children graduated university.

Hayward was educated at Otago Girls' High School, and went on to study at Dunedin Teachers' College, graduating as a teacher in 1921. She started her university degree, a Bachelor of Arts, part-time during her teacher-training, and then took a third year at the University of Otago, graduating in 1925. During her training, placement in a country school was compulsory, and she completed this in 1926, teaching infants at a two-teacher school in Heriot. Placements in three Dunedin schools followed, including one teaching a special class at Caversham School for five years. Hayward then applied to spend 18 months as one of three visiting teachers, employed to visit rural students engaged in the New Zealand Correspondence School. The scheme was a trial, with two teachers based in Auckland and Hayward in Otago. At the end of the trial, the scheme was made permanent, and Hayward then became one of the country's first visiting teachers. She was attached to Dunedin North Intermediate School, and held the role until her retirement. Hayward remembered the post-World War II years as especially difficult times, due in part to the disciplinary and financial expectations of returned servicemen, and new rules requiring pupils to stay at school until the age of 15.

== Service ==
Hayward took an active role in many professional and community organisations. In 1937, she was the Dunedin Women's Teachers' Association delegate to the conference of the New Zealand Women Teachers' Association in Wellington. She was also a member of the Brains Trust on Home and Family Problems, through which she proposed pre-marital training in budgeting and other matters that she saw as common difficulties for young couples. Other positions she held include vice-president of the Dunedin United Nations Association, president for ten years of the Dunedin Business and Professional Women's Club, president of the Dunedin branch of the National Council of Women (1951–1955), member of the Board of Studies of the New Zealand Council for Christian Education, member of the Deacon's Court of Knox Church, and of the committees of the National Association for Alcoholism, the Otago Pioneer Women's Memorial Association and the Dunedin branch of the Marriage Guidance Council. Hayward was a member of the executive of the Free Kindergarten Association, and was instrumental in the setting up of the New Zealand Kindergarten Teachers' Association. She was a member of the Otago Hospital Board for eighteen years, and for eleven of those was the hospital board's representative to the St John Ambulance Association. Hayward was an advocate for physiotherapy education in her role on the hospital board, and often hosted social events for physiotherapy students at her home.

During World War II, Hayward served on the Mayoress's Patriotic Committee. She wrote every month to Otago teachers in the services, posting as many as 240 letters a month, using her father's Gestetner machine but also enclosing handwritten notes. Hayward began hosting afternoon teas for soldiers, especially those with connections to the Dunedin Teachers' College, at her house. These gatherings then turned into events specifically for teachers, and later lunches for retired teachers, and were still continuing several times a year in 2017.

In 1951–1952, Hayward served as vice-president of the New Zealand Educational Institute, and the following year she became only the second woman to be elected president, following Margaret Magill in 1933. In her presidential address, she stressed the importance of parent–teacher associations, which, she noted, had grown "phenomenally" in the previous few years. Hayward considered such associations to provide "the opportunity and the obligation" for parents and teachers to "learn together and exchange opinions and views" in order for schools to reflect the values of the communities in which they were based. During her time as president, Hayward advocated for better working conditions and a fairer promotion scheme for teachers. She was also a member of the New Zealand Council for Educational Research.

After her retirement as a teacher in 1959, Hayward spent fifteen years working as a field officer for the Crippled Children's Society (now CCS Disability Action). In 1974, she organised 1000 volunteers for the Commonwealth Paraplegic Games, which were held in Dunedin. There were about 250 competitors, and Hayward arranged a roster with one-to-one support, each volunteer being on duty every third day.

Hayward died in Dunedin on 12 November 1999 at the age of 97, having never married, and her ashes were buried in Andersons Bay Cemetery. Her great niece is political scientist Janine Hayward.

== Honours and awards ==
Hayward was made Dominion Life President of the kindergarten movement, and a life member of both the Dunedin Free Kindergarten Association and the New Zealand Kindergarten Union. In 1960, Hayward was elected a life member of the NZEI. She was awarded honorary life membership of the Dunedin branch of the National Council of Women in 1968. In 1953, Hayward received the Queen Elizabeth II Coronation Medal. In the 1956 Queen's Birthday Honours she was appointed a Member of the Order of the British Empire, for services rendered in connection with educational and women's organisations. In 1971, she received a copy of the vote of thanks awarded to her by the Order of St John for her work.

== Honorific eponym ==
The University of Otago residential college Hayward College is named after Vera and her brother, Jock Hayward. Dunedin Hospital's child development unit, which opened in 1974, is named the Vera Hayward Centre, "in honour of her life's work with child welfare and her service on the hospital board".
