= Nicola Wheen =

New Zealand environmental law professor

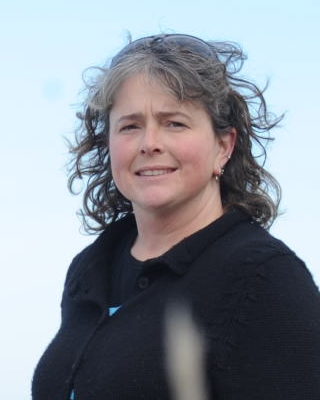
- Wheen in 2010

Academic background
- Education: University of Otago
- Thesis: The Resource Management Act 1991 and water in New Zealand : impact and implications (1995)
- Academic advisors: Geoffrey Palmer, Bruce Harris

Nicola Rowan Wheen is a New Zealand academic, and is a full professor at the University of Otago, specialising in national and international environmental law, and environmental law and the Treaty of Waitangi.

== Academic career ==
Wheen joined the law department at the University of Otago in 1984 as a student, where she earned her LLB. She then joined the academic staff in 1989, rising to associate professor in 2015 and full professor in 2021. She completed a Master of Laws titled The Resource Management Act 1991 and water in New Zealand: impact and implications at the University of Otago in 1995. She researches how law addresses international and national environmental problems, such as whaling, marine mammal by-catch, climate change, freshwater allocation, forest conservation on Māori-owned land, the environmental impacts of tourism, and how sex work is regulated through planning law. Wheen also has an interest in how the Treaty of Waitangi affects environmental law.

Wheen is a member of the Centre of Research Excellence Coastal People: Southern Skies, led by Anne-Marie Jackson and Rosalina Richards. She has co-edited books on the Treaty of Waitangi, and Treaty of Waitangi Settlements, with Janine Hayward. Wheen also wrote chapters in Environmental Histories of New Zealand, published in 2002, and The Law of Research, published 2003.

Wheen teaches and convenes courses on Public Law, Environmental Law and International Environmental Law at Otago, and has supervised more than fifty honours and postgraduate students. She is on the editorial board of Otago University Press.

== Selected works ==
=== Books ===
- Wheen, Nicola; Ruru, Jacinta (2004), "The environmental reports", in Hayward, Janine; Wheen, Nicola (eds.), The Waitangi Tribunal: Te Roopu Whakamana i te Tiriti o Waitangi, Bridget Williams Books, doi:10.7810/9781877242328_8, ISBN 9781877242328
- Hayward, Janine; Wheen, Nicola R., eds. (2012), "The Meaning of Treaty Settlements and the Evolution of the Treaty Settlement Process", Treaty of Waitangi Settlements, Bridget Williams Books, pp. 13–28, doi:10.7810/9781927131381_1, ISBN 9781927131381

=== Articles ===
- Wheen, Nicola. A Natural Flow - A History of Water Law in New Zealand. Otago Law Review 71 (1997-2000).
- Brookers environmental legislation handbook 2014, with an introduction by Ceri Warnock and Nicola Wheen. (Brookers environmental law handbook series). Thomson Reuters New Zealand
- Wheen, Nicola Rowan; Heidi Baillie (2019). "GMOs, pests and participatory and representative democracy in decision-making about GM activities in New Zealand". Asia Pacific Journal of Environmental Law. 22 (2): 257–276. doi:10.4337/apjel.2019.02.04. Wikidata Q108871614.
- Ceri Warnock; Wheen, Nicola Rowan (2012). "Sex Work in New Zealand: The Re-Importation of Moral Majoritarianism in Regulating a Decriminalized Industry". Canadian Journal of Women and the Law. 24 (2): 414–438. doi:10.3138/cjwl.24.2.414. Wikidata Q108871617.
- Ceri Warnock; Wheen, Nicola Rowan (2008). "Climate Change, Wildlife Movement and the Law: A Case Study from New Zealand". Commonwealth Law Bulletin. 34 (3): 527–550. doi:10.1080/03050710802038379. Wikidata Q108871620.
- Wheen, Nicola Rowan; Ruru, Jacinta Arianna (2011). "Providing for Rāhui in the law of Aotearoa New Zealand". Journal of the Polynesian Society. 120 (2): 169–182. ISSN 0032-4000. Wikidata Q124457507.
