= Te Pouhere Kōrero =

New Zealand Māori history society

Te Pouhere Kōrero, also called the Māori History Association of Aotearoa, is a society focusing on Māori history that was established in 1992. Te Pouhere Kōrero has published a journal Te Pouhere Kōrero Journal and is a national collective of Māori historians.

== History ==
A meeting was held in 1992 in September at Massey University with the idea of serving Māori historians. The idea of forming a collective and the name Te Pouhere Kōrero came from this meeting. A second meeting in 1992 was arranged by Joe Pere and Rose Pere at Rongopai Marae near Gisborne and Te Pouhere Kōrero was formally established. Manuka Henare was the inaugural chairperson. Mīria Simpson was a key person until her death in 2002. Others involved included Te Ahukaramu Charles Royal, Aroha Harris, Monty Soutar, Ailsa Smith, John Delamare, Tui Macdonald, Danny Keenan and Buddy Mikaere. Members are Māori people interested in history and includes authors, librarians, museum workers, iwi researchers and those who are studying or working at universities. Past chair-people include Nēpia Mahuika.

In 1999 the membership was about 70 people. Te Pouhere Kōrero is one of a number of other organisations of historians in New Zealand including The New Zealand History Organisation, Professional Historians’ Association of New Zealand/Aotearoa and New Zealand History Teachers’ Association.

In 2009 a sub-group specifically for students was formed called Te Pū Nehenehe.

== Activities ==
Symposiums, meetings and hui (gatherings) are part of the work of the society. These events bring together new and experienced members and questions such as ways the past can be researched, theorised, "and connected to the realities of home, marae (spiritual and cultural meeting place), and people". He Rau Tumu Kōrero is the symposium of Te Puhere Kōrero. The 2013 symposium theme was Beyond the Binary: Maori and Iwi Historical Perspectives held at Waikato University, Te Whare Wananga o Waikato, Hamilton. In 2014 it was held at the National Library of New Zealand in Wellington, co-hosted by the Alexander Turnbull Library and Manatu Taonga – Ministry for Culture and Heritage with the theme being The Future of Māori History.

The organisation publishes the Te Pouhere Kōrero Journal. The first edition was published in 1999 and the second one in 2002. The third edition is based on presentations from the symposium He Rau Tumu Kōrero held in August 2008 at Waikato University. It was edited by Aroha Harris and Alice Te Punga Somerville with guest editorial from Nēpia Mahuika. Contributors included Monty Soutar, Margaret Mutu, Carwyn Jones, Rangimarie Mahuika, Erin Keenan and Arini Loader. Other editions include 2010, 2011, 2012, 2014 and 2016. Aroha Harris is the co-editor of Te Pouhere Kōrero Journal.

On 17 March 2022, Jacinda Ardern, launched Aotearoa New Zealand's histories (ANZH) and Te Takanga o Te Wā as compulsory curriculum documents to guide the teaching about the country's history in English- and Maori-medium schools in New Zealand from 2023. Te Pouhere Kōrero 10, a special edition of the journal Te Pouhere Kōrero: Māori History, Māori People, was also launched in March 2023 as a response to this reset of the New Zealand history curriculum. Aroha Harris described the release of the journal as "a special event to encourage educators across the country to give it [the curriculum] the mana and care it deserves. For those unsure of how they might teach Māori and iwi histories, we hope this special edition provides some value, insight, and direction." Arini Loader told Waatea News that the writers came from a "position of strength" in terms of their research, some having worked on the development of the curriculum, and made the point that in te ao Māori, historians can be any people within Hapū and Iwi who can tell their stories using the skills and knowledge of Mātauranga Māori. In her contribution to the journal, Aroha Harris noted that while Māori history is about stories, is also encapsulates "sources, methods, philosophical underpinnings, analytical framing, the history...[and can]...connect across time, place, people, seas; its certainty that Māori histories are everywhere, deep within the land, always." Harris suggested that notwithstanding debates about compulsion, a well-resourced curriculum could be effectively implemented and "bolster the education of critically engaged citizens of the future, encouraging all our children and mokopuna to ground themselves, to identify themselves, and to remember their ancestors."
