= Aotearoa New Zealand's histories =

History curriculum for schools

New Zealand's histories (ANZH) and Te Takanga o Te Wā refer to the documents for use in English- and Maori-medium New Zealand schools from 2023 to guide the explicit and compulsory teaching about the country's history.

Although the final documents were part of reviews of the New Zealand education system by the Labour government elected in 2017, there had been pressure building previously for the focus of the reforms to be on developing a curriculum that truly reflected the history of New Zealand. This had included a petition taken to parliament in 2015 by high school students expressing concerns about how the New Zealand Wars were being taught, ongoing debate in the media amongst academics and educationists, and another petition urging teaching of New Zealand histories to be compulsory. In response to this, the government commissioned advice and consultation, and announced that New Zealand history would be a compulsory subject in schools by 2022, with the actual implementation occurring in 2023.

In 2025, as part of a campaign promise in the National-ACT Coalition Government agreement to "rebalance" the curriculum, the new draft social sciences curriculum modified the existing content in the histories curriculum, particularly in relation to Māori and global history, with this receiving criticism from various groups, including the NZ History Teachers Association.

== Background ==
In 2015, the public were made aware of concerns about the approach to history in New Zealand schools when students from Otorohanga College gathered more than 10,000 signatures on a petition in support of setting aside a day to remember the New Zealand Wars. The students had visited battle sites, including Rangiaowhia, in 2014 and talked with kaumātua who often had stories of cruelty to women and children during the conflicts. The head girl at the school, Rhiannon Magee, said that the past should be acknowledged and not hidden, and a teacher Mariana Papa noted that the students had the support of King Tuheitia and other Māori leaders. Historian Paul Moon felt a day of commemoration would build understanding of the wars, although the response from David Bennett and Scott Simpson, members of the governing National Party, was more measured and not totally in support of a public holiday.

In December 2015, the students took the petition to the New Zealand parliament. Nanaia Mahuta, in her role as Hauraki-Waikato MP, presented the petition to the National Government of the time, pledging Labour's support for a proposed public holiday in recognition of the struggle. Mahuta said she hoped that "the Government [would] see the importance in recognising the New Zealand Land Wars and its contribution to our national identity...[ensuring people]...continue to tell the story of ancestors who went to war to fight for their land, rather than have it taken by colonial government". John Key, Prime Minister, ruled out an extra holiday and said he had not had much support for replacing one of the existing holidays.

In 2016, the Māori Development Minister Te Ururoa Flavell confirmed Te Pūtake o Te Riri, He Rā Maumahara as a national day on October 28 to annually commemorate the New Zealand Wars. The first day was held on 11 March 2018, the anniversary of the Battle of Kororāreka in 1845, and it was agreed that future days would be held annually on 28 October, to mark the signing of He Whakaputanga o te Rangatiratanga o Nu Tireni, "serving as a reminder of the rangatiratanga and authority that Māori fought to protect and preserve throughout the New Zealand Wars". At the 2019 Rā Maumahara, members of the Labour Government were welcomed onto Ōwae Marae, Waitara. After receiving a "white feather or raukura as a symbol of peace" during the welcome, the Prime Minister, Jacinda Ardern, said that rather than just one day of commemoration, she favoured "putting the teaching of New Zealand history into our schools, into our education system, for all our young people to learn, I think that is the most significant and important thing that we can do going forward".

By December 2017, after the newly elected Labour Government had made some educational reforms, the New Zealand Ministry of Education said it would work with students, parents and community to review progress across the National Curriculum. To support this process Ministerial Advisory and Reference Groups would be established. On 21 February 2018, Chris Hipkins, the Minister of Education, announced a review of the education system, and it was reported in the media that "the focus of his review would likely be to put in place an education model that is more reflective of the 21st century". The Cabinet agreed to initial actions arising from the Curriculum, Progress and Achievement Ministerial Advisory Group's June 2019 report. The Advisory Group supported the development of "new strategies and responses to create the conditions to empower all ākonga [students] and their whānau [families] to thrive in a changing world, and to meet the challenge of addressing educational inequity" through a review of the "design and use of local curriculum".

There was increasing pressure for an update of the curriculums to focus on the teaching of New Zealand histories in schools, but Chris Hipkins said on 13 September 2018 he did not favour this, noting:

At the moment, history is a core part of the New Zealand curriculum. What schools choose to teach within that is over to schools because schools have the ability to design their content based on local knowledge and local needs. I think the New Zealand Wars are an important part of New Zealand's history as a country, but again, I don't want us to become too prescriptive about which parts of the New Zealand Wars, for example, should be standard at which schools.

When Hamilton Junior High School began teaching about the New Zealand Wars in 2018, students and staff felt not only did it revive the "voices" about the wars, but also built understanding of challenges to colonialism that were happening in their community. In 2018 Fairfield College in Hamilton unveiled a pou in memory of those who fought in the wars. School principal Richard Crawford, a strong supporter of New Zealand history being a compulsory part of the curriculum, stressed the importance of learning about "the conflict and how it helped shape current-day New Zealand". Students at St Paul's Collegiate School had been specifically learning about battles in Waikato during the wars for more than 20 years according to the principal Defyd Williams and each term ended with visits to the sites within the region. Williams said the learning touched on many of the "big questions of history", and according to one student, "we live here, we should all know our history. It's our duty. Even if we're not from here, we're still here at this time and need to be a part of it".

Leading up to Waitangi Day 2019, history teachers called for "compulsory teaching of New Zealand's Māori and colonial history in schools", prompting responses from Chris Hipkin that the Education Ministry was working on projects to address this, and Kelvin Davis, associate minister of education and Minister for Māori Crown Relations, who said it would be "inappropriate for governments to come along and dictate specifics of what's taught in schools". A petition presented to the New Zealand House of Representatives on 11 June 2019, requested "legislation that would make compulsory the coherent teaching of our own past across appropriate year levels in our schools, with professional development and resources to do so provided".

== Announcement in 2019 ==
Jacinda Ardern was reported in the Waikato Times in September 2019, as saying she had "heard the calls from those who embed themselves in the teaching of our history...[and]...it prompted me to have a conversation again with the Minister of Education to point out to him that this was becoming equally a grass roots movement". On 12 September 2019 Ardern and Chris Hipkins made a joint announcement that the national curriculum would be updated to make explicit the expectation that New Zealand's history is taught to all students in New Zealand schools and kura from 2022. Hipkins also said that the need to update Te Marautanga o Aotearoa (Māori-medium curriculum) and The New Zealand Curriculum was "to ensure equitable outcomes and that it is fit-for-purpose, with a stronger focus on the wellbeing, identities, languages and cultures of all ākonga". Radio New Zealand reported that history lessons were expected to include the "arrival of Māori, early colonisation, the Treaty of Waitangi, immigration to New Zealand, and the evolving identity of the country", and this was seen as a change from what was happening at the time when schools could choose how they covered history. Ardern said this was about resetting the national curriculum to build awareness of what has shaped the nation and Hipkins committed the Ministry of Education to working with experts, iwi and Pasifika and school communities.

=== Responses ===
Acknowledging the significance of the announcement, Joe Davis, of Ngāti Hei descent, recalled that he had been telling students at local schools for years about James Cook being welcomed ashore with a pōwhiri in Mercury Bay, regarded as the "first official welcoming held between Māori and Pākehā...[and]...when kids come here and you explain to them what happened here, it dawns on them that there's more to history than just English history and American history".

Hokotehi Moriori Trust chair Maui Solomon said that it was an "opportunity to dispel some of the myths about Moriori". Graeme Ball from the New Zealand History Teachers Association (NZHTA) supported the initiative, which he said needed to be driven by people with a history background, and while some of the process might be "contentious...that is part of engaging in healthy debates and evolving theories about subjects such as history".

The New Zealand Historical Association website described the announcement by Ardern as "surprising" because the Ministry of Education had argued against the intended compulsory history curriculum seeing it as possibly too prescriptive and not in support of the current focus in the Social Sciences curriculum for schools to have a degree of autonomy in this learning area. The statement was made in the discussion that the decision to carry on developing the new curriculum was "political" and a response to public pressure following the presentation of the petition to the government by the students from Otorohanga.

Philippa Hunter, an academic from Waikato University whose research has specialised in "social sciences education, critical pedagogy and curriculum perspectives", suggested that a "momentum" had built up to the making of the decision. Hunter identified recent actions from the government that indicated a growing awareness to acknowledge the effects of colonisation, concluding: "most importantly, the racist underbelly of Aotearoa New Zealand society has been given scrutiny following the March 15 Christchurch massacre".

Historian Vincent O'Malley, who had earlier claimed that any "half-decent education system around the world should deliver a basic knowledge of one's own country...[and New Zealand's]...is currently failing to do that", said in 2019 that the announcement by the government had "exceeded his expectations".

Articles in 2020 provided further background to the decision. Leah Bell, one of the original petitioners to parliament in 2015, wrote that "the history of colonial New Zealand is a story pulsing with connection, love, and whānau across war-drawn boundaries...[and]...The New Zealand Wars can be examined and taught through a social history paradigm, in which the human story of land, language, love and loss are viewed through enduring human relationships". Another commentator said that the intended compulsory curriculum was in contrast to the reforms of the 1980s in New Zealand education, which had seen a "high autonomy model" under Tomorrows Schools, and this had not facilitated a "coherent approach" to teaching history. The author articulated some of the detail from a submission they had made at the Māori Affairs Select Committee set up to examine this topic. Information presented included links to the current curriculum that showed it was already expected students would "create an Aotearoa New Zealand in which Māori and Pākehā recognise each other as full Treaty partners, and in which all cultures are valued for the contributions they bring...[because]...the curriculum acknowledges the principles of the Treaty of Waitangi and the bicultural foundations of Aotearoa New Zealand".

== Draft documents ==
=== Development ===
To develop, implement and review proposed drafts of ANZH and Te Takanga o Te Wā, the Ministry of Education set up several collaborative groups in 2020. The purpose of the Ohu Matua Reference group was explicitly stated as:

Te Ohu Matua will provide a broad range of perspectives – including of ākonga, whānau and communities – to inform the design, development and implementation of the Aotearoa New Zealand’s histories curriculum content, resources and supports. It will include Māori, Pacific, history and curriculum experts, leaders and teachers from the schooling sector, and others with a strong interest in shaping how New Zealand’s histories are taught.

=== Trialling and consultation ===
After surveying 157 schools from 3 February to 31 May 2021, the Ministry of Education trialled draft content for Aotearoa New Zealand's histories in approximately 60 English-medium schools and the draft content for Te Takanga o Te Wā in approximately 20 Māori-medium kura. Feedback from the public was invited through a survey or general submission. The public online survey received 4,491 survey responses and 488 submission with feedback also received in face-to-face engagements. Chris Hipkins, The Minister of Education said that the feedback received had been "wide-ranging, clear, and at times confronting" and he saw it as a good thing that New Zealanders wanted to examine and discuss the nation's histories.

By June 2021, the Ministry of Education had received 4880 submissions on the draft document and several principals reported that they had trialled it, generally successfully with some acknowledgement that teachers would need extra training and the necessity of monitoring that the curriculum did not become a "tick box" add-on to the current Social Sciences strand. The president of Te Akatea, the Māori principals' association, Bruce Jepsen, said the curriculum was an opportunity for all members of New Zealand society to understand that creating a "more equitable and socially just future" depends on learning how the present is shaped by the past.

The New Zealand Council for Educational Research (NZCER) was contracted in 2021 by the Ministry of Education to analyse and report the findings from the public engagement. The report acknowledged that the purpose of the consultation had been to answer three questions: Do people think the draft content reflects us as a nation? What is most important to people? What do people see as the challenges in implementing this curriculum change? The writers note that "history is a contentious and contested space" and at the positive end of the responses the proposed changes to the curriculum were seen as "important, overdue, and of benefit to learners and to Aotearoa." Some strongly opposed expressed "outright rejection and serious concern expressed about the proposed ideas introduced in the draft curriculum content", while the "extreme end of the negative commentary... [included]...responses that were anti-Māori, anti-Māori history, and anti-Māori language".

=== Review ===
A panel of experts convened by the Royal Society of New Zealand to advise the Ministry of Education expressed some concerns about the "brevity, fragmentation, and, therefore, coherence of the curriculum draft", and the possible overlooking of key events and initiatives that had shaped the history of the country, [including] "first encounters between Māori and Europeans, and late 20th century New Zealand and the emergence of national identity...[with little focus on topics such as]...women and wāhine Māori, labour, welfare, disease and demographics, and economic activity as a driver of New Zealand history". Another commentator noted that the panel had questioned the approach taken that "directs students to judge the past before allowing them to ask questions, explore and find out what the past was...[making]... "ethical judgement concerning right and wrong". In the same article, it notes that the panel identified a 600-year gap between the arrival of Māori and the arrival of Europeans but still strongly supported the importance of Māori history as a key component of the new curriculum draft. One academic from Victoria University of Wellington acknowledged some of the concerns in the report from the Royal Society and warned that focusing on the content of what is taught at the expense of how students learn can have pedagogical implications. The writer concluded however that students will be learning to think critically about history, and that, "rather than a passive acceptance of particular stories and narratives, the curriculum model outlined encourages an interactive approach to learning history that aims to support young people in thinking independently about the past and making sense of their place in the world".

=== Commentary ===
New Zealand writer Philip Temple described the draft as "timid" and wondered if it was a "21st century revival of the 18th century Enlightenment concept of the 'noble savage', children of nature in an undisturbed state". Temple said Ron Crosby, a member of the Waitangi Tribunal and author of The Musket Wars: A History of Inter-iwi Conflict, 1806–1845, expressed disbelief that the Musket Wars between 1806 and 1845, which he described as the "longest period of warfare in New Zealand", had no coverage in the draft document, which meant that prevailing "complicated relationships between iwi and hapu...[could not be]...examined and understood in any discussion of claims and counter claims under the Treaty of Waitangi, and especially within the context of the European colonisation that immediately followed".

ACT New Zealand MP and education spokesperson Chris Baillie said that the draft having no mention of New Zealand leading the world in being the first country to give the vote to women in 1893 was one example of a gap in the narrative of the curriculum. According to Baillie, the curriculum focused mostly on colonisation, which he claimed was a deliberate attempt by the Labour government to promote an "unequal society...[where]...there are two types of New Zealanders: Tangata Whenua, who are here by right, and Tangata Tiriti who are lucky to be here". However, Graeme Ball, the chair of the New Zealand History Teachers' Association, said the new curriculum was "not pushing an agenda or a single narrative".

In a discussion on the webpage of the New Zealand Historical Association, historians expressed concerns about the draft as well as acknowledging strengths of the document. Emeritus Professor at the University of Otago Erik Olssen said introducing mātauranga Māori and having the flexibility to explore local stories was a positive move. However, he questioned whether there was provision for the "tools of historical inquiry...[to ascertain] ... "the 'facts'; determining their reliability and relevance; explaining divergence and difference with regard to the former; and crafting an argument based on the analysis of the evidence". Jock Phillips expressed the potential of the curriculum to "create a thriving historical culture" and the importance of getting it right so as to not inspire "resentment about the compulsory teaching of history". Jack Vowles, a professor of history at Victoria University of Wellington, said the curriculum was "narrow and prescriptive" while Claudia Orange held that it "promises to be an exciting new opening up of our history in ways that will engage not only students but historians as well as other New Zealanders".

Arlana Delamere, who on 23 April 1992, while a student at Green Bay High School in Auckland, had lodged a claim with the Waitangi Tribunal that the lack of teaching of New Zealand history in the country's curriculum was a possible breach of the Treaty of Waitangi, was pleased with the announcement by the Prime Minister, noting that "to end racism, to help broken people today, you have got to learn the history. You’ve got to have all the facts in front of you". The Tribunal claim stated that "the history of Aotearoa is a taonga [treasure] under the terms of the Treaty of Waitangi and that its teaching must be given priority over the teaching of the history of any other country", to which the student added: "it is my right as a person of Māori descent, as indeed I believe it is the right of all students in Aotearoa, to have the option of being taught the history of Aotearoa as the primary focus of the history syllabus rather than the history of another country". The claim also said that "the failure to teach this, had led to feelings of whakamā (shame or embarrassment) among Māori at the bottom of the socio-economic rung, the victims of widespread hostility directed at them by non-Māori who had no understanding of the history of Aotearoa". Delamare's father, Tuariki John Delamere, who had encouraged the lodging of the claim, said the new curriculum was "transformative", but noted that his daughter's claim was still unresolved, and remains "ahead of its time and now hugely relevant".

== Official launch ==
Prime Minister Jacinda Ardern launched the document on 17 March 2022 at two Auckland schools, Sylvia Park and Mount Wellington. Ardern said that the goal of the document is to "give us a better understanding of one another, through learning more about Māori, about the migrant history of Pasifika, our Asian communities. Across the board it's all part of who we are and it's all part of this curriculum" and Jan Tinetti, the Associate Minister of Education, explained that it was part of a "refresh" of the whole New Zealand curriculum over five years. At the launch, Aupito William Sio said the new approach to teaching history would "enhance New Zealand's diversity...[because]...it bridges the gap between people particularly when you've got a growing New Zealand population that is really diverse".

== Structure and format ==
The content of Aotearoa New Zealand's histories has three elements: To understand big ideas around New Zealand's history; to know the contexts from stories, events and people; and to do critical thinking about the past. The critical thinking was seen as allowing students to "consider and take actions based on valid information from various sources that have multiple perspectives". The three elements of 'understand', 'know' and 'do' are combined and show progress outcomes for students at different year levels. The 'understand' component centres around four big ideas: Māori history is the foundational and continuous history of Aotearoa New Zealand; colonisation and settlement have been central to Aotearoa New Zealand's histories for the past 200 years; the course of Aotearoa New Zealand's histories has been shaped by the use of power; and relationships and connections between people and across boundaries have shaped the course of Aotearoa New Zealand's histories.

Although a separate document, Aotearoa New Zealand's histories was connected in the current New Zealand Curriculum as part of the Social Sciences learning area, which focused on "how societies work and how people can participate as critical, active, informed, and responsible citizens...[with]...contexts drawn from the past, present, and future and from places within and beyond New Zealand". As the government progressed a full refresh of the curriculum, Te Mātaiaho, a draft framework was released in March 2023. This document retained the 'Understand-Know-Do' structure of Aotearoa New Zealand's histories, the content of which was directly included in the learning area Te ao tangata|Social Sciences.

Te Takanga o Te Wā is in Te Marautanga o Aotearoa, Māori-medium curriculum, as a new strand in Tikanga ā-Iwi (Social Studies). As of November 2023, there were four strands, Te Whakaritenga Pāpori me te Ahurea (Social Organisation and Culture), Te Ao Hurihuri (The Changing World), Te Wāhi me te Taiao (Place and environment), and Ngā Mahinga Ohaoha (The Economic World). A fifth strand, Te Takanga o Te Wā, will be based on He Tamaiti Hei Raukura, a conceptual framework developed by the Ministry of Education that "stems from a Māori world view and reflects the values of Māori society and what whānau want for their children as Māori, and as global citizens...[and]...takes a holistic approach that places the ākonga at the centre of teaching and learning". The framework recognises students as 'he uri whakaheke' (a descendant), 'he tangata' (a person), 'he puna kōrero' (a communicator), and 'he ākonga' (as a learner), [supporting the development of]..."skills and abilities that will enable them to succeed in a changing world, by immersing Māori knowledge in the Māori world".

== Reception ==
There was a mixed response from New Zealand politicians to the launch. Brooke van Velden from the ACT party said in a parliamentary debate that the history curriculum "focused too much on colonisation and dividing people into villains and victims...[and]...doesn't actually talk about the beauty of New Zealand history and the fact that we are a multiethnic society". James Shaw responded to van Velden's comments and said it was vital to be honest about the past, even it is not pleasant and New Zealanders need to just say "look this is what happened, what this is what took place, and there are consequences that we feel today for that, particularly for Māori". van Helden also suggested that the new curriculum would create a culture based on race and was not a true reflection of New Zealand's history with little attention given to achievements such as women's rights, scientific progress and technological innovations. Debbie Ngarewa-Packer, co-leader of Te Pati Māori, replied that ACT appeared to have a problem with teaching the history of tangata whenua, and by denying the effect of colonisation, were whitewashing history. Associate Education Minister Kelvin Davis said the curriculum "opened opportunities for children to learn about their own backyard, which many generations of Kiwis had been denied". In his role as Opposition education spokesperson, Paul Goldsmith stated that the curriculum did not focus enough on economic development although he acknowledged it was important to "localise history" to share stories from different regions in New Zealand and how they have influenced cultures.

When asked in an interview for a response to the view that the curriculum is likely to cause racial separation and [the] "erasing of a past age of racial harmony", Joanna Kidman, a sociologist of Ngāti Maniapoto and Ngāti Raukawa descent, commented that what some might have seen as a "golden age" of race relations was experienced differently by many and if the new curriculum includes the "voices of those who have often been left out of the historical narrative...that could be transformative". Kidman had earlier participated in collaborative research and co-authored Fragments from a Contested Past Remembrance, Denial and New Zealand History, which explored why it is difficult for New Zealanders to learn and teach difficult aspects of the nation's history and what they often chose to forget. Kidman noted that at times "state memory and tribal memory of past events often differ significantly", with New Zealand's history portrayed at times as "collective [and] unified...[missing out]...the messy bits". She concluded that it was important to recognised there were issues in New Zealand's history that remain dynamic and at times unresolved, and while the new curriculum might make some people uncomfortable, it could develop understanding of how the past was shaped and allow "a new way of looking at the kinds of future we can build as a nation".

Charlotte Macdonald from Victoria University said putting history of New Zealand systematically at the centre of schooling in the country was a sign of a "mature society" and Bruce Jepsen, President of Te Akatea, the Māori Principals' Association, stated that the curriculum has the potential to "transform education and society...[enabling citizens]...to think, speak, and teach in decolonising and honourable ways, and I say honourable ways in terms of Te Tiriti as a foundation".

The date of the announcement by Ardern, was 162 years on from the start of the First Taranaki War, and Wharehoka Wano, chief executive of Te Kāhui o Taranaki Iwi, stated it was a "travesty" most New Zealanders did not appreciate the significance of this day and the curriculum was "overdue".

Academic Melani Anae, one of the original members of the Polynesian Panthers, said the history would help Pacific children to make connections and engage in learning by relating to "real people, real life history." Fa’atili Iosua Esera, a school principal in Mangere East, believes Pasifika principals and teachers will have the chance to "incorporate their own local history into the lessons...[and identify]... any contribution that Pacific over the years have made to the New Zealand way of life".

It has been noted by two Wellington-based academics that the new curriculum could build the capacity of students to engage critically with the past and be able to make "informed, evidence-based response(s)...[rather than]...passive acceptance of a particular interpretation or an uncritical rejection". The same article concludes: "The capacity to think critically about the past is an important aspect of helping young people to successfully operate as citizens in a liberal, diverse, representative democracy...[and]...potentially goes some way to avoiding polarised and binary ways of thinking about the past (and the present) and encourages young people to be comfortable with complexity."

Writing in The Guardian, New Zealand historian Vincent O'Malley proposed that the new curriculum was one of the..."positive steps on the path towards a more historically aware, engaged and mature Aotearoa". In the same article, he made the point that:

the purpose of remembering our past, warts and all, in an honest and upfront manner has never been about making anyone feel guilty or ashamed about the actions of their ancestors. It has not been about creating discord or division but rather binding us together as a nation that can honestly confront its own past. That is not and has never been about assigning blame. It is just about taking ownership of our history.

In March 2023 two academics from the University of Auckland positioned the new curriculum as an "opportunity to foster inclusive, reflective, informed and critical understandings of local and national pasts and how they connect to our present and orient us to the future – and to each other", but note that teaching such a 'difficult history' presents challenges to educators. Exploring the research on why this had not been taught before in New Zealand, the writers suggest "critical mourning" as a strategy of acknowledging losses without romanticising the violent past..."and to present it as still developing, not yet settled, but a living legacy that we all contribute to".

With a focus on the new history curriculum, Te Pouhere Kōrero published the tenth volume of their journal early in 2023. Reported in the media as a resource to support the teaching of Māori history in schools, one of the contributors, Aroha Harris, said "the Māori perspective being included in the journal is good for anyone interested in learning the history of Aotearoa". In the chapter "The future is Māori", Harris notes that the first 'big idea' in the curriculum states: "Māori history is the foundational and continuous history of Aotearoa New Zealand". The case is made that if this is more than "ensuring Māori content", and has genuine influence over choice of topics and the training of teachers, Māori history can provide a "sturdy frame for the whole of the curriculum". Harris concludes that this can create the opportunity to "gather up all the threads of all our histories and connect them... demonstrate the ways we are connected to the past and why we are always connected to it. It can express in multiple ways that staying connected to the past is what allows us to make connections with each other in the present".

== See also ==
History of education in New Zealand
