= Vincent O'Malley =

New Zealand historian

Vincent O'Malley FRSNZ FRHistS
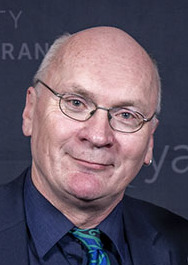
- O'Malley in 2023
- Known for: Historian of the New Zealand Wars
- Spouse: Joanna Kidman

Academic background
- Thesis: Rūnanga and Komiti: Māori Institutions of Self-Government in the Nineteenth Century, New Zealand Studies PhD thesis, Victoria University of Wellington, 2004

Academic work
- Notable works: Fragments from a Contested Past: Remembrance, Denial and New Zealand History: co-authored (2022); Voices from the New Zealand Wars/He Reo Nō Ngā Pakanga o Aotearoa (2021); The New Zealand Wars: Ngā Pakanga o Aotearoa (2019); The Great War for New Zealand: Waikato 1800-2000 (2016)
- Notable ideas: The New Zealand Wars were defining conflicts in the nation's history.; What a society chooses to remember or forget speaks to its priorities.
- Website: https://www.meetingplace.nz/

Vincent Michael O’Malley FRSNZ FRHistS (born 1967) is a New Zealand historian whose work focuses on the history of how relationships between Māori, European settlers (Pākehā) and colonial governments shapes the development of New Zealand as a nation.

In his publications, and as a presenter and media commentator, O'Malley takes public positions on the teaching of history in New Zealand schools, the importance of understanding the impact of the New Zealand Wars, interactions between Māori agency and Crown responses during the colonisation of the country and the role of the Waitangi Tribunal. O'Malley has received multiple research grants, won several literary awards and is involved in a wide range of professional associations. He is Research Director at HistoryWorks, a company he co-founded in 2004.

== Early life and education ==
O'Malley is the youngest of nine children in a working class Irish Catholic family from Christchurch, New Zealand. His father and brothers worked in the Addington Railway Workshops, but instead of following them in this line of work, he has noted:

I became the first member of my family to go to university and that opened up new possibilities for me. But I didn't have a plan to become a historian. It was just something that fell into place. I got offered a three-month contract researching Treaty claims for iwi in 1993, moved from Christchurch to Wellington to do that, and a quarter century later I'm still here doing the same thing.

The family lived in Riccarton and O'Malley attended Ilam Primary School, Kirkwood Intermediate, and high school at St Thomas of Canterbury College. He holds a BA (Hons), 1st Class, in History from the University of Canterbury and completed his PhD in New Zealand Studies through the Stout Research Centre at Victoria University of Wellington in 2004. O'Malley said that at university, he learned a lot "about the complexities of the relationships between Māori and the Pākehā migrants" from Tipene O’Regan, an academic with an Irish-Māori whakapapa.

He told Dale Husband that the first of the O'Malleys came from Ireland as assisted immigrants to Christchurch in the early 1860s, and acknowledged that his family's background may have shaped his views on the treatment of Māori. He has reflected before on parallels between the Māori experience and the Irish experience, saying Ireland was "the original blueprint for British imperialism" and many dispossessed Irish Catholic men found themselves fighting on the side of the empire in New Zealand.

== Career and associations ==
From October 2000 to July 2004, O'Malley was Research Manager at the Crown Forestry Rental Trust, set up under the Crown Forest Assets Act 1989 to protect Māori interests by ensuring that before the selling of land for forestry by the Crown, the Waitangi Tribunal would confirm who has ownership of the land. In July 2004 O'Malley co-founded HistoryWorks Limited, and as of 2022, is in the role of Research Director.

He was a joint principal investigator of a Marsden Fund (Royal Society of New Zealand) project on Remembering and forgetting difficult histories in New Zealand, focusing specifically on the New Zealand Wars, and has twice been awarded The New Zealand History Research Trust Fund Award in History, in 2019 for The New Zealand Wars and in 2010 for Cultural encounter on the New Zealand frontier: the meeting of Māori and Pakeha, 1769-1840.

O'Malley became a Professional Member (MRSNZ), Royal Society of New Zealand Te Apārangi in 2021 and in the same period, a Fellow of the Royal Historical Society (FRHistS) Since 2020 O'Malley has been a Member of The New Zealand Society of Authors and a mentor for the Mentor Programme run by the Society. In 2016 he took on the position as an editor for H-ANZAU (H-Net Humanities and Social Sciences Online, History and Culture of Aotearoa New Zealand and Australia) and continues in that role as of 2023. O'Malley was a Judge for Copyright Licensing New Zealand/New Zealand Society of Authors Writers' Awards in 2021 and 2022.

== Public policy positions ==
The introduction to a research-based book co-authored by O'Malley in 2022 states:

What a nation chooses to remember or forget speaks to its contemporary priorities and sense of identity...understanding how this process works enables us to better imagine a future with a different, or wider set of priorities

The authors claim that the narrative about how the modern nation of New Zealand is shaped by history remains contested and the ways in which the New Zealand Wars, which took place between 1843 and 1872, are remembered or forgotten, reflect "how memory and silence about this difficult past permeates people's lives in the present". With this as a focus, O'Malley takes public positions on "intergenerational problems" that have resulted from not recognising the influence of the New Zealand Wars on New Zealand society.

=== Support for the new history curriculum ===
When the New Zealand Prime Minister, Jacinda Ardern announced in September 2019 that New Zealand history would be taught in all schools from 2022, O'Malley noted the importance of an education system in developing a "more robust and truthful understanding of history", commenting that the "momentous decision to develop the new curriculum, could address the issue of most students leaving school with little knowledge or understanding of their own country".

From 2020 until 2021, O'Malley had input into the development of the draft history curriculum as a member of Ohu Matua Advisory Group on Aotearoa New Zealand Histories Curriculum established by the New Zealand Ministry of Education. The purpose of the advisory group was to collate a broad range of perspectives from students, families and communities and provide advice on the design and implementation of the curriculum.

He was also a member of a group of experts who worked on reviewing the draft document for the government. While the review report did identify some gaps in the curriculum that needed to be addressed, it concluded:

The drama and constantly changing nature of the circumstances in which people in Aotearoa New Zealand lived their lives is at the heart of an exciting history curriculum. How people navigated the constraints and opportunities of their times, and the meaning we make in the present about those who are both linked to us yet distanced by time, should lie at the heart of a powerful curriculum.

Writing in the Guardian, O'Malley said that New Zealand coming to terms with internal conflicts [is a]..."positive [step] on the path towards a more historically aware, engaged and mature Aotearoa".

Before the announcement of the new curriculum, there had been the campaign started in 2014 by a group of students from a New Zealand high school to raise awareness of the New Zealand Wars following visits to some of the battle sites. O'Malley acknowledged that the students' petition to the New Zealand Government in 2015 resulted, not only in a national day of commemoration for the victims of the New Zealand Wars, but also a public focus on the importance of teaching the history about this in the country's schools. An earlier article co-authored by O'Malley and Joanna Kidman holds that this action by the students was a "turning point in Pākehā remembrance" about how influential the New Zealand Wars had been in shaping the country's histories, reflecting "a greater willingness to face up to the bitter and bloody realities of these conflicts...[and]... to introduce local histories and studies of these conflicts into the school curriculum".

O'Malley participated in later research, described in the media as a "journey to understand why there is so much denial in the way we look at and talk about Aotearoa's past". The data from the research had shown a significant number of complaints against the students' petition, which according to O'Malley indicated many held a view of the country's history that was "steeped in political nostalgia and idealism...[a]... mythical version where James Cook is a hero and New Zealand had the greatest race relations in the world ", and it was challenging for them when confronted with an alternate reality. When asked about the raupatu (land confiscations) that happened because of the New Zealand Wars, O'Malley made the point that while many Pākehā choose to forget or ignore this difficult history, it is important to recognise and acknowledge the stories of the country's history that have been carried by iwi on their own.

=== Acknowledging the New Zealand Wars ===
O'Malley describes the New Zealand Wars as a "series of conflicts that profoundly shaped the course and direction of [the] nation's history" and stresses the importance of understanding and acknowledging the consequences of them. It has been said in a review that the main theme of the book The New Zealand Wars: Nga Pakanga o Aotearoa written by O'Malley in 2019, is that the wars had a "nasty, brutal and devastating" effect on some Māori communities and were a consequence of the drive for settlers to acquire land and "the government's determination to impose its sovereignty in the face of Māori resolve to maintain rangatiratanga". The reviewer holds that O'Malley's position of it as "no longer being acceptable to justify the wars on the basis of a colonial predestination, native savagery, or chivalrous contest", highlights the importance of New Zealanders knowing the true history of these wars. Another review, in the New Zealand Listener, notes that "O’Malley urges knowledge and understanding as a way forward... his book is a landmark study of the New Zealand Wars and an important contribution to change". The great war for New Zealand, Waikato 1800-2000, published in 2016, is described on the publisher's website as "a monumental new account of the defining conflict in New Zealand history...that shaped the nation in all kinds of ways: setting back Māori and Pākehā relations by several generations and allowing the government to begin to assert the kind of real control over the country that had eluded it since 1840". O'Malley's work on the Waikato War is seen as contributing "alternative scripts to the official government version of the history of the New Zealand Wars" by exploring factors such how an increased number of Europeans resulted in loss of Māori land and contributed to a breakdown in what had previously been friendly relations between the British and Waikato Māori. O'Malley is said by this reviewer to place most of the responsibility for the war directly on to Governor George Grey, saying that he provoked and exaggerated a fear there was to be a Kingitanga attack on Auckland to justify increasing troops for an invasion of Waikato, effectively choosing war. Research by O'Malley in 2013 that examines the events leading up to the invasion of Waikato by British Imperial Troops authorised by the governor George Grey, finds there is no valid justification for this pre-emptive action, noting in particular the lack of definitive evidence that there was to be an attack on Auckland. O'Malley concludes that "the government did have a choice between peace and war...[and]...it opted for the latter while denying Waikato Māori a similar opportunity to choose". O'Malley holds that by the time the Waikato War had begun in the 1860s, what had been a relationship based on "Māori willingness to engage with Pākehā, to welcome them to this country and to look after them...[became]...a manifestation of that desire for Pākehā to assert their authority and their dominance over the country".

When the National Day of Remembrance for the New Zealand Wars took place in Waitara in 2019, O'Malley's book The New Zealand Wars/ Ngā Pakanga o Aotearoa was noted in the media as providing background information about how land issues had arisen in Taranaki. It was said that the book explained how increased numbers of immigrants from Britain and Ireland had created high demand for Māori land in the mid-1850s, and despite attempts by local iwi to resolve issues, there were still violent interventions by the government troops. Although the lands were briefly returned to Māori, after the Crown admitted the purchase had been unjust, this was overturned soon after and the land again confiscated creating ongoing resentment which shows how the past can "resonate today". The media article noted O'Malley had previously said it is unfortunate that most of the New Zealand populace are dismissive of the Wars because "being honest about historical civil conflicts is essential to reconciliation and healing in communities and the nation"..

O'Malley is not surprised that many of the sites of the war are unrecognised or a source of embarrassment and says they should be protected and promoted. He believes understanding the history behind the names of streets is important, and in 2020 was commissioned and funded by the Hamilton City Council in conjunction with Waikato-Tainui to prepare an independent report examining culturally sensitive place names and sites in the city which would gather historical information to support discussion within the community about cultural issues. In the introduction to the report, O'Malley clarifies that the project was to assist councillors in considering the historical evidence that supported a possible name change of the city of Hamilton and the renaming of specific streets. This involved developing portraits of those who had streets named after them, including former New Zealand governor and politician Sir George Grey, Prussian-born soldier and artist Gustavus Ferdinand von Tempsky, and former Native Affairs Minister John Bryce. The report had followed a strong debate about Captain Hamilton, after whom the city is named, but O'Malley told local media that while [Hamilton] was involved in the occupation of Ngāruawāhia in December 1863, he was not a significant player in the history of New Zealand. On 29 November 2022 a ceremony was held in Hamilton to officially change the name of Von Tempsky Street to Puutikitiki Street, and Dawson Park to Te Wehenga Park. Hamilton Mayor Paula Southgate acknowledged that the process began with O'Malley's report [which had] "identified three street names as being particularly egregious to Māori", and she hoped people in the city would have an open mind toward the changes. Tureiti Moxon said it was "a great occasion as Māori history was becoming a bigger part of the city's fabric", noting that some of the street names were a reminder of a colonial past which had caused suffering and trauma [and] "precipitated the theft of a million acres of land from this region". The final decision to make the changes had followed considerable debate within the Hamilton Council. Three members expressed concern [that] "the change was a form of cancel culture", but Committee chair Mark Bunting said the process was "supported by mana whenua...[and]...Von Tempsky's unpalatable legacy was not in question...so changing the signs was not a difficult decision".

In the introduction to Voices from The New Zealand Wars He Reo nō ngā Pakanga o Aotearoa published in 2021, O'Malley discusses the value of using archived accounts of historical events such as the New Zealand Wars and the challenges of appraising "tendentious fragments from a contested past". He holds the view it is important to acknowledge that bias in some accounts may reflect the voices of privileged contributors - in this case Pākehā and male voices - and this needs to be considered when making judgements about historical events based on these sources. The conclusion is that the process requires a "conversation with the past - and a willingness to hear the different voices embedded in the archival record". Several reviews have recognised the significance of O'Malley's work in gathering these accounts. The book has been described as the combination of an "incredibly rich set of sources – extracts from diaries, memoirs, letters, official documents and newspaper reports – with meticulous scholarship and a perfect editorial balance", often showing the dilemmas Māori leadership had in deciding their approach to the Wars, the details behind the confiscation of land by the Crown and vivid details of "some of the atrocities committed during the wars such as the killing of settler families at Matawhero or the deliberate burning down of a whare at Rangiaowhia while several Māori were inside". Another review noted the importance of hearing Māori accounts of the New Zealand Wars, a point supported by O'Malley.

Making the assertion that no one cause can explain the war, O'Malley has written that while there was the demand for land for an increasing number of British settlers arriving in the country, the wider theme was the "tension between increasing Crown assertions of absolute sovereignty and Māori expectations of continuing authority". He notes that this is partly about an "unresolved ambiguity" in the Treaty of Waitangi as a result of two versions - one in English said to "proclaim sovereignty" over the country; the other in Te Reo, signed by the majority of Māori which is understood as meaning kawanatanga or governance was ceded with an understanding that Māori communities would retain tino rangatiratanga (full chiefly authority) over their lands, resource and affairs.

The legacy of the wars which resulted in high numbers of deaths, also includes, according to O'Malley, ongoing cultural and economic issues in New Zealand as a result of land confiscations. These were enabled by the New Zealand Settlements Act passed in 1863 and impacted the contribution Māori had made to New Zealand's economy at the time by the production of food sold both locally and in international markets. While in the same piece O'Malley does acknowledge that there was criticism of the confiscations by prominent Pakeha of the time such as a former Chief Justice Sir William Martin and Henry Sewell a lawyer and politician, he maintains that "cattle and crops were seized or destroyed, flour mills and homes torched, and the lands that had been key to this wealth confiscated...[with the result that]...generations of Māori were condemned to lives of landlessness and poverty as a consequence".

In 2015, on the verge of the Anzac Day commemorations in New Zealand, O'Malley questioned whether the large amount money allocated to this event was justified and took the position that the "casualty rates...[in the New Zealand wars]...might actually have been higher on a per capita basis than the horrendous losses suffered by New Zealand troops during World War I". O'Malley suggests that what he calls "historical amnesia" with respect to the New Zealand Wars, may be because they "do not rouse nationalist pride...[and]...who wants troubling introspection when we can have heart-warming patriotism instead?"

The point has been made by O'Malley that "any discussion of contemporary Māori poverty that fails to acknowledge the long history of invasion, dispossession and confiscation is missing a vital part of the story". He has said that the wars were more than just a question of land ownership and underpin the nature of relationships between Maori and Pākehā and how they can live together in New Zealand. Interviewed by Jesse Mulligan on RNZ in September 2024, O'Malley said the Wars were significant because they defined the kind of country New Zealand was at the time and "what it aspired to become", noting victory by the Crown and scant regard for the Treaty of Waitangi has resulted in many issues around acknowledging rangatiratanga for Māori that are still under debate. His position on the way forward is to "learn the details of some of those terrible incidents they are difficult to erase from the memory...[and]...understanding, mutual respect and dialogue will bring us together not tear us apart. It's about reconciliation, not recrimination".

=== Early interactions between Māori and European settlers ===
Referring to initial contacts between Māori and Pākehā, O'Malley said in an interview that the "process of discovery and encounter is a mutual one...[and to]...think that Māori [were] just sitting on the shore waiting for Abel Tasman or James Cook to turn up...[was]...certainly not the case". The Meeting Place: Māori and Pākehā Encounters, 1642-1840 written by O'Malley in 2012, is seen by one reviewer as being significant because it focusses on a time when Māori and the European settlers generally cooperated in meeting mutual needs to access goods and technology in a rough balance of power, although the settlers were dependent on the generosity of Maori. In the book, using a model, the 'middle ground', as first presented by Richard White in his history of the Great Lakes region of North America, O'Malley contends that some of the elements of what White called 'middle ground' - such as confrontation, enough of a balance of power to prevent one side compelling the other, and mutual need - existed in New Zealand from 1642 to 1840, and in particular in the years between 1814 and 1840. Another reviewer supports O'Malley's basic argument in the book that between 1769 and 1840, New Zealand was a site of "cultural interaction and exchange between Māori and Pākehā", and was an opportunity for an outcome that may have "avoided the harsh racism that described race relations by the later part of the century, and which New Zealand, like the other settler colonies, had to live with for a century". Beyond the Imperial Frontier: The Context for Colonial New Zealand (2014), is a series of essays collated by O'Malley that explore the ways Māori and Pākehā interracted in the years before 1840 when there was a degree of cooperation, to the decades after the signing of the Treaty of Waitangi which are seen as being more competitive. One reviewer said the essays "explore some of the legal, social, judicial, military and political instruments employed by the Crown to extend its areas of influence, setting those against Māori strategies developed in response".

A commentator has noted O'Malley shows evidence that, despite the settlers being dependent on Māori, some violent conflicts did occur. According to O'Malley these varied greatly in different parts of the country, and although there was a risk to the balance of power due to the numerical superiority of Māori and their increased access to firearms, appreciation of mutual needs by both parties meant there were incentives to maintain peace. O'Malley's writing of this period, according to a reviewer, "conveys lucidly and with vivid and pertinent examples, the way that the history of imperial encounter developed through a dynamic that was locally driven, as well as imperially determined, and one that was driven by the past rather than being directed by certain future".

Indicating that there were changes coming in the power relations between Māori and Pākehā, O'Malley has also written about an initiative before 1840 by James Busby, the official British Resident at the time in New Zealand, to develop a "centralised body of chiefs" though which he hoped to "indirectly govern the tribes", based on a concept described O'Malley as [running]..."contrary to customary Māori decision-making processes which involved a much wider group than rangatira}". O'Malley considers that this model did to some extent increase the power of the chiefs within their tribes and in their involvement with Europeans, many of whom preferred to work with a small group of chiefs rather than negotiate with larger hapū. While Busby may have had mixed success in implementing this model, O'Malley acknowledges that the British Resident did achieve two notable successes by confirming the selection of a national flag in March 1834, and the signing of He Wakaputanga o te Rangatiratanga o Nu Tirene (the Declaration of Independence) in October 1835. O'Malley holds that aiming to indirectly rule through rangatira, remained [in various guises]..."the prevailing objective of Crown officials for at least the next three decades".

=== Changing relationships between 1840 and 1900 ===
Reviewing a series of essays by O'Malley on this period, Carwyn Jones from Victoria University of Wellington, says that the works "tease out contestation between Crown and Māori authority...[addressing]... attempts by the Crown to engage with Māori through mechanisms and institutions of English law and highlight the agency of Māori in these processes, whether through active negotiation, direct resistance, or other creative responses".

In evaluating Māori responses to threats of losing land or becoming totally subservient to European culture during the nineteenth century, O'Malley argues in an article in Ethnohistory Journal, that colonisation had left Māori with "disease, depopulation, land loss, and the threat of being overwhelmed by a flood of incoming European migrants, particularly after formal British annexation following the signing of the Treaty of Waitangi in 1840", and that their challenge was to survive in the post-Waitangi era without being "entirely subsumed by the new colonial order".

The Treaty of Waitangi signed in 1840 was said by O'Malley to be significant because it introduced the Crown as a participant in complex land dealings with Māori to meet the expectations of higher numbers of settlers that they would gain land. There was also a change in relationships between Māori and Europeans as a result of attitudes of racial superiority brought by some of the settlers, disrupting what could have been a reasonable expectation of a mutually beneficial partnership. In the same piece, O'Malley suggests that instead, there was a "struggle between two competing visions of what the nation was and what it might become".

In 1852 New Zealand got a new constitution from Britain that allowed for a parliament to be set up, but as O'Malley notes the entitlement to vote was based on individual property holdings issued by the Crown, and as most Māori were joint holders of tribal land, they were not enfranchised. When the actual parliament sat in 1854, O'Malley records that it was made up entirely of Europeans advocating their own interests and excluding Māori who were ultimately disappointed in their call for a more inclusive parliament or a "tandem body that could sit alongside of it" to reflect a genuine relationship based on the Treaty of Waitangi where Māori and Pākehā could jointly make rules for the governance of the colony.

Agents of Autonomy: Māori Committees in the Nineteenth Century 1998 is the first of numerous works by O'Malley that explores how Māori organised themselves during this time when the Crown was attempting to secure large amounts of Māori land. The proactive way in which Māori overhauled Rūnanga and developed komiti (committees) in an effort to create a system of governance, has been described by O'Malley as a creative response..."in which mechanisms of tribal self-government were reinvented, mixing indigenous with exotic influences to establish new and much stronger bodies better suited to cope with the challenges confronting Māori in the new environment".

Māori initiatives to manage community affairs in keeping with their customs, meant that at some stage there would be an engagement with English law. O'Malley has written of how this played out in Northland, including an account of an unofficial murder trial prior to 1840, which had proceeded under English law with the consent of Māori. This was said to have convinced James Busby that northern Maori were willing to accept this form of justice. However this was not totally accepted by settlers and some chiefs, countering what is recorded as a naive assumption that "English law would be welcomed with open arms". The trials had in effect been an attempt to extend British law into areas that were controlled by Māori and the dilemma for the Crown, according to O'Malley, was to decide whether this approach would lead to more conflicts between settlers and tribes, or to follow an approach suggested by George Clarke Senior, a former missionary who had been appointed Protector of Aborigines in 1840, that Māori would be more likely to obey laws they had been involved in framing and implementing. Proposals he put forward in 1843 included establishing courts with the support of chiefs and having juries that, partially or exclusively, included Māori depending on whether the cases involved Europeans. Clarke's ideas gained little support and when George Grey was appointed as Governor in 1846, he made his position clear that all Māori should be subject to English law. O'Malley holds, however, that some of the systems put in place by Grey were based on the work of Clarke and included the setting up of a Resident Magistrates Court 1846 and the appointment of assessors, some of whom were local chiefs, to assist the Court with dispute resolution. O'Malley notes unofficial runanga were often called in to assist with "collective decision-making...[effectively meaning]...an intended instrument of English law was thus in some respects remoulded for customary Māori purposes".

One response by the Crown was an attempt to provide state authority to these Māori tribal communities. In what has been seen as the first example of this devolution, George Grey in 1861, developed a 'plan of native government' which O'Malley contends had no intention of "allowing the runanga (tribal councils or assemblies) ...to develop into state-sanctioned instruments of genuine self-government...[and]...extension of English law into what were perceived to be ungovernable Māori districts remained the priority throughout". In this paper however, O'Malley concludes that Grey's plan received little support and argues that, particularly in Northland where the scheme was fully implemented, Maori retained concerns about the possible intrusion of the government into areas over which rangatira had authority and control".

The intent and functioning of the Native Land Court, established under The Native Lands Act 1862 have, according to O'Malley, been interpreted differently by New Zealand historians. He notes that the generally accepted interpretation by most early twentieth-century historians was that the courts were just and fair to Māori because they ascertained their title to land. He examines a challenge to this approach by revisionists, including Alan Ward, that began in the 1950s and resulted in "established orthodoxy" which held that the Court did not further Māori interests and this has been a key tenet of the Waitangi Tribunal set up in 1975 to consider historical land claims. O'Malley maintains this confirms acceptance of what he calls "the newly established consensus of the court as an overwhelmingly negative institution". O'Malley then explores what he calls "neo-revisionist" approaches that conclude the court was not as bad as portrayed by earlier historians, citing Richard Boast who wrote in 2008 [that]..."just because the Native Lands Act came to have consequences that were widely perceived as disastrous...it does not prove that this was intended from the beginning". While he is generally sceptical about this perspective, O'Malley holds the position that it is important to see the debate as contributing toward understanding the role of the Native Land Court. In the essay, O'Malley further acknowledges the neo-revisionists made some valid points, including the likelihood many of the judges were sympathetic toward Māori aspirations and understood some of the language and customs, but concludes that there is more evidence the court was "an instrument of alienation" and despite some agency by Māori in their engagement with the process, the court essentially had the role of "encouraging land sales and the destruction of Māori tribal structures". A reviewer describes essays on the subject by O'Malley as "demonstrating a willingness to think differently about key events in New Zealand's colonial history... opening up a space for further conversations about New Zealand history and identity".

One outcome of the involvement of Māori with the Native Land Court is noted by O'Malley as a loss of around 22 million acres of their land by the end of the nineteenth century. Yet he is of the opinion that attempts by Māori to manage affairs in keeping with their customs through the innovative runanga and komiti, while unable to stem the tide of land loss, left a legacy of withstanding the policies of assimilation and "played a significant part in ensuring the survival of the Māori as a distinct — and still largely tribal — people".

=== Advocacy for Māori claims to the Waitangi Tribunal ===
One of O'Malley's roles has been to prepare reports for claims to The Waitangi Tribunal, and as a freelance historian has researched widely on the historical relationship between Māori and the Crown and presented evidence to the Tribunal.

O'Malley's reports for the Tribunal provide an overview of the historical background of complex events lying behind claims. In a report for the Tūhoe-Crown Settlement, an agreement ratified by the people of Ngāi Tūhoe on 4 June 2013, he writes that the tribe - who had never signed the Treaty of Waitangi - made demands for autonomy after the Crown assumed sovereignty of their lands. In the report, O'Malley explains how during the 1860s the Te Urewera district of the tribal lands became singled out by the Crown as an area harbouring Māori from other areas who were resisting the intrusion of the Crown into their affairs and there were brutal invasions of the area. The tribe was also subject to legislation and disputed land surveys that undermined their case, with the Crown later initiating divisive tactics within the tribe by attempting to play Rua Kenana off against other leaders in Tūhoe. When this was unsuccessful the police raided Kenana's settlement at Maungapohatu in 2016, arresting him on disputed charges of sly-grogging and killing his son, leading O'Malley to conclude: "by 1921, Tūhoe autonomy was all but finished." O'Malley maintains that the establishment of the Urewera National Park in 1954, continued to restrict access of Tūhoe to their customary resources and because of the struggle to develop the land he documents that as of 2014, "nearly five-sixths of all Tūhoe live outside Te Urewera and of those who remain a significant proportion suffer from severe socio-economic deprivation."

The Te Rohe Pōtae District Inquiry (Wai 898) involved over 270 claims around issues such as alienation and management of land, including the manner in which the Crown had constructed a main trunk railway through the district. The claim was made to redress what has been described in the media as "an act of aggressive land grabbing by the Crown...that saw Maori lose ownership of more than 640,000 acres of land." O'Malley produced an extensive report on the claim, commissioned by the Waitangi Tribunal in 2010. It presented the historical events around the land confiscations that lead to a breakdown in relations between Māori and the Crown, and concluded that the people of Te Rohe Potae became caught up in the Waikato War and despite claims at the time that they had been warned in a proclamation by Governor Grey of an impending invasion by British troops, had no "opportunity to comply with the demands set out in the proclamation" which were in effect an ultimatum, and as a result were unable to protect "their own lives and lands." Another companion report prepared concurrently is introduced by O'Malley as "problematising matters previously regarded as uncomplicated". These included many "conflicting accounts...[of]...several highly controversial incidents", the "chaotic, disorganised, confusing and poorly documented process" of land confiscations and the lack of a "single coherent Crown voice." The report concluded:

Responses to the raupatu on the part of Te Rohe Potae hapu and iwi, along with their wider kin, were remarkably diverse, encompassing a range of different tactics and strategies, though all underpinned by a shared sense of loss.

The Waitangi Tribunal released their final report on the claim in 2018, with a summary confirming there had been breaches of the Treaty of Waitangi that damaged the mana and autonomy of Māori in the tribal area. In an overview of the Report, the Māori Law Review in 2018, noted specifically that the Tribunal had identified the "cumulative impact of the Crown's Treaty breaches in the district has been breakdowns in social and political relationships, land loss, and enormous social, economic and cultural prejudice, the impacts of which continue to this day." This thought was echoed in one media report at the time, with a summary comment that: "the Waitangi Tribunal found the Crown caused serious social harm and acted dishonestly to Māori, engaging in an aggressive land grab that caused, and is still causing, the rohe and its people damage."

One reviewer says that while there has been research about the role of the Waitangi Tribunal [with]..."the capacity to enrich New Zealanders' knowledge of their nation's history and deepen their understanding of race relations today...most of that work has remained under the public radar but [O'Malley] draws on several facets of that historiography to place some key events under a sharper light."

O'Malley co-authored The Treaty of Waitangi Companion: Māori and Pākehā from Tasman to Today in 2010. In the preface to the book, the authors note that there are a wide range of interpretations of the Treaty, but it is important to understand it as part of the broader history of relationships between Māori and Pākehā. In an earlier publication exploring the historical scrutiny of the Treaty of Waitangi O'Malley cites the works of other New Zealand historians including Claudia Orange and James Belich that place the Treaty of Waitangi in the context of one of many important agreements reached between the Crown in New Zealand and Māori and holds that these need to be carefully considered in terms of how they affect later claims to the Waitangi Tribunal. In an updated version of this article published in 2014 as Beyond Waitangi: Post-1840 Agreements between Māori and the Crown, O'Malley suggests it is a "travesty of history" to label many of the transactions that happened within these agreements as "simple real estate deals", and concludes that the local treaties are a reminder of both "the piecemeal extension of Crown over the country...[and]...the way in which New Zealand history taps into a much older narrative of indigenous encounters with Europeans."

O'Malley has also written that, while the work of the Waitangi Tribunal is an important start, New Zealanders reconciling themselves to the nation's history is more than just about supporting the settlement of historical Treaty of Waitangi claims. He notes that the Waitangi Tribunal has said: "While only one side remembers the suffering of the past, dialogue will always be difficult. One side commences the dialogue with anger and the other side has no idea why. Reconciliation cannot be achieved by this means". In noting that iwi have carried a troubled history alone, O'Malley puts the challenge to New Zealanders to own, acknowledge, respect and pass on this history, not to "feel guilty or ashamed about the actions of their ancestors...[but]...to be big enough, and confident enough, to say, 'yes, this is part of our history too' (alongside the things we feel good about today, like all those people who stood up against injustices in the past when they saw them)."

In Contested Memory: Rā Maumahara and Pākehā Backlash, an analysis of the opposition to the petition presented to the New Zealand government in 2014 asking for a more honest acknowledgement of the New Zealand Wars, O'Malley and Joanna Kidman assert that some New Zealanders have been deeply troubled [by the challenge to]..."long-cherished and deeply ingrained myths about the history of their country". For example, the establishment of the Waitangi Tribunal in 1975 to investigate historical claims of Māori was seen by critics as a "grievance industry", reflected later in responses, such as the Orewa Speech by Don Brash in 2004, which attacked "race-based privileges for Māori". O'Malley and Kidman suggest [that] "for many Pākehā New Zealanders an emphasis on historical aggrievances, and even on ethnic or racial differences cut across an imagined nation identity that was both harmonious and homogenous". O'Malley is said to [lament]..."the more conservative approach taken as a consequence of [this] sustained academic critique and public hostility."

== Awards ==
In 2024 O'Malley was elected as a Fellow of the Royal Society Te Apārangi. In 2023, O'Malley was awarded the Royal Society Te Apārangi's Humanities Aronui Medal for "his contribution to the research, knowledge, and public understanding of New Zealand history, particularly of the New Zealand Wars and Māori-Pākehā relations throughout the nineteenth century".

O'Malley was announced as a semifinalist in the 2023 New Zealander of the Year Awards on 13 December 2022. Miriama Kamo, the patron of the awards, said that through a challenging year, each of the semifinalists had "demonstrated their unwavering commitment to making this country a better place for us all – stepping up to act as support and strength for whānau, for communities, for our country and beyond." O'Malley was noted for producing a "rich set of sources and voices to tell some of New Zealand's most important stories - painting a vivid and at times confronting picture of a past that many New Zealanders know little about."

On 1 December 2022 it was reported in the New Zealand media that O'Malley, Stephanie Johnson and James Norcliffe, were winners of the Prime Minister's Awards for Literary Achievement. Jacinda Ardern said, "the awards recognise not only [the writers'] literary achievements, but also the significant impact their work has had on the cultural landscape of Aotearoa". O'Malley expressed gratitude for the non-fiction award, noting how in recent years there had been an increased willingness by people in New Zealand to acknowledge and engage with the history of the country, and when young people [learn] "critical thinking skills, and the ability to analyse evidence and sources and make informed judgements" within the new history curriculum, "future generations [can be] historically literate."

In 2022, O'Malley won the General Non-Fiction Ockham New Zealand Book Award for Voices from the New Zealand Wars | He Reo nō ngā Pakanga o Aotearoa. Category convenor Nicholas Reid said the book "tells us of the past but is relevant to the present, when public debate feeds New Zealanders’ hunger to know how our country was formed...[and is]...nuanced in its balance of both Māori and Pakeha voices and it respects the attitudes and assumptions of people who lived in an era different from our own."

At the New Zealand Historical Association's conference in 2017, O'Malley was named as the winner of the Mary Boyd Prize for his article "Recording the Incident with a Monument": The Waikato War in Historical Memory which charted "changing perceptions of the Waikato War in national memory and consciousness."

In 2017 The Great War for New Zealand: Waikato 1800-2000 was a finalist for New Zealand Heritage Book Awards, Non-Fiction Category, and longlisted in the General Non-Fiction Category of the Ockham New Zealand Book Award. The book was also chosen by The NZ Herald as its pick for the best book of 2016. It is described in the press release as "refreshingly even-handed" in how it approaches the topic because, [while the]..."overwhelming weight of evidence points to [Māori] being the victims of undeserved aggression...[O'Malley]... acknowledges those Europeans who behaved honourably and those Māori whose actions contributed to the tragedy", concluding it deserves the award because it recognises "how New Zealand arrived at where it is today and, therefore, how to work towards a better and more honest future."

O'Malley was the 2014 J D Stout Research Fellow at Victoria University of Wellington with a project named: A history of the Waikato War. The Waikato War: Myth, History and the 'Art of Forgetting. During his time as a Fellow, O'Malley worked on The Great War for New Zealand, a history of the Waikato War.

O'Malley's book, The Meeting Place: Māori and Pakeha Encounters, 1642-1840, was a finalist in the General Non-Fiction Category of the NZ Post Book Awards for 2013.

== Further selected works ==
=== Journal articles ===
- Kidman, J., & O’Malley, V. (2020). Questioning the canon: Colonial history, counter-memory and youth activism. Memory Studies, 13 (4)
- O'Malley, V. & Kidman, J.(2018) Settler Colonial History, Commemoration and White Backlash: Remembering the New Zealand Wars. Settler Colonial Studies, Vol.8, No.3, 2018, pp. 298–313
- O'Malley, V. (2016) A Tale of Two Rangatira: Rewi Maniapoto, Wiremu Tamihana and the Waikato War. Journal of the Polynesian Society, Vol.125, No.4, 2016, pp. 341–357
- O'Malley, V. (2009) 'A Living Thing': The Whakakotahitanga Flagstaff and its Place in New Zealand History. Journal of New Zealand Studies, No.8, 2009, pp. 41–60
- O'Malley, V. (2008) A United Front Against Capitalism? Unemployed Workers' Organisations in Christchurch, New Zealand, during the Depression. Labour History Review, Vol.73, No.1, 2008, pp. 145–166

=== Books reviewed ===
- Ray, Arthur J. Aboriginal Rights Claims and the Making and Remaking of History. H-Empire, H-Net Reviews. March, 2017.
- Pickles, Katie; Coleborne, Catharine, eds. New Zealand's Empire. H-Empire, H-Net Reviews. July, 2016.
- Ballantyne, Tony. Entanglements of Empire: Missionaries, Māori, and the Question of the Body. H-Empire, H-Net Reviews. October, 2015.
- Russell, Lynette. Roving Mariners: Australian Aboriginal Whalers and Sealers in the Southern Oceans, 1790-1870. H-Empire, H-Net Reviews. July, 2013.
- Binney, Judith. Encircled Lands: Te Urewera, 1820–1921, (review no. 1167)

=== Presentations and lectures ===
- Contesting the Past: Remembrance, Denial and New Zealand History, (New Zealand Fabian Society Lecture, (Wellington, July 2022). In its promotion, this lecture by O'Malley was said to be relevant for New Zealanders because it reflected how "history has rarely felt more topical or relevant as, all across the globe, nations have begun to debate who, how and what they choose to remember and forget".
- The Great War for New Zealand and the Making of Auckland, (Auckland Museum Institute Humanities Lecture, online, July 2022). In this online talk, O'Malley looked at how War in the Waikato, [which]..."shaped the nation in many ways and caused incalculable misery and lasting harm for many Māori communities", was played out in Tāmaki Makaurau, leaving a legacy that has sealed the future of that city.
- Teaching and Learning About the Invasion of Waikato with Joanna Kidman and Tom Roa, (Te Pae Here Kaahui Ako, Teachers’ Only Day, Hamilton, 4 June 2021). As New Zealand was about to fully launch a new history curriculum, this talk was given to over 1000 teachers from 22 schools in Waikato. O’Malley, Tom Roa, a Principal Investigator for Te Pūnaha Matatini, and Joanna Kidman, asked teachers to "open their hearts" and embrace the importance of telling Waikato's "shatter zoned history." Local iwi Ngāti Wairere also made a promise that they would work in partnership with schools to support teachers in this learning.
- Frontier Town: History, Memory and Myth on the King Country Aukati, (University of Auckland History Department Public Seminar, 3 September 2020). O'Malley has described this webinar [as]..."drawing on research for a Marsden Fund project documenting how the New Zealand Wars are remembered and forgotten, this seminar traces the intersections of history, memory and myth in this Waikato frontier town."
- History Talk - Vincent O'Malley, (Otago Girls' High School, 16 October 2019). In this lecture to New Zealand high school students, O'Malley highlighted how as a result of laws introduced following the New Zealand wars, Māori lost much of their land, and greater awareness of issues like this, builds "understanding and appreciation of how and why New Zealand has developed the way it has today."
- Land Deeds as Treaties: The New Zealand Experience (A Paper Presented to the 17th Annual Australian and New Zealand Law and History Society Conference La Trobe University Melbourne July 1998).
- 'Begging with a Bludgeon': The East Coast Confiscations (A Paper Presented to the New Zealand Historical Association/Te Pouhere Korero Conference Victoria University of Wellington February 1996). In this paper O'Malley made the case that, while in 1995 the NZ Government announced a moratorium on the disposal of surplus Crown lands acquired under confiscation legislation passed in the 1860s, this applied only to districts confiscated under the New Zealand Settlements Act of 1863. It did not take into account the lands that were also confiscated under special legislation passed with respect to the East Coast, including the East Coast Land Titles Investigation Act of 1866, its 1867 amendment, and the East Coast Act of 1868.
