= Ceri Warnock =

British-born New Zealand environmental legal scholar

- Born: Ailsa Ceri Warnock

Academic background
- Education: Cardiff University; University of Auckland
- Alma mater: University of Oxford

Academic work
- Discipline: Environmental law, resource management
- Institutions: University of Otago

Ceri Warnock is a British-born New Zealand environmental lawyer and professor in the School of Law at the Auckland University of Technology.

== Academic career ==
Warnock has an LLB from Cardiff University and an LLM from the University of Auckland. She graduated from the University of Oxford with a DPhil.

Before moving to New Zealand, Warnock practiced as a barrister in England and Wales.

Warnock moved to the University of Otago as a lecturer in 2006 and was appointed associate professor, effective 1 February 2016. She was promoted to full professor with effect from 1 February 2019.

Warnock moved to Auckland University of Technology in 2026. It was announced in August 2026 that she would replace Professor Khylee Quince as Dean of the Law School, effective 28 September 2026, following the conclusion of Professor Quince's five year term.

Warnock was awarded the 2013 international Research Fellowship by the New Zealand Law Foundation.

== Selected works ==
- Warnock, Ceri; Suszko, Abby (2013), Resource management, LexisNexis NZ, ISBN 978-1-927149-78-2
- Warnock, Ceri; Baker-Galloway, Maree (2015), Focus on resource management law, LexisNexis NZ Ltd, ISBN 978-1-927248-74-4
- Warnock, Ceri (2020), Environmental courts and tribunals : powers, integrity, and the search for legitimacy, Hart Publishing, an imprint of Bloomsbury Publishing, ISBN 978-1-5099-4008-0
