= Elizabeth McLeay =

New Zealand political science academic

Academic background
- Education: University of Auckland
- Thesis: Parliamentary careers in a two-party system : cabinet selection in New Zealand. (1978)
- Doctoral advisor: Robert Chapman

Academic work
- Discipline: Political studies
- Doctoral students: Janine Hayward

Elizabeth McLeay is a New Zealand political scientist. She is currently an Emeritus Professor at Victoria University of Wellington.

== Qualifications ==
McLeay has a Bachelor of Arts from Victoria University of Wellington, a Postgraduate Diploma of Teaching from the Auckland Secondary Teachers' College (which has since been integrated into the University of Auckland), and a PhD from the University of Auckland. Her doctoral thesis investigated parliamentary careers and cabinet selection in New Zealand.

== Career ==
McLeay has taught at the City of London Polytechnic and the University of Auckland, but spent most of career teaching comparative government and politics at Victoria University of Wellington, from 1990 to 2009. From 2010-2012 McLeay was a Visiting Senior Research Fellow, at the Victoria University of Wellington's School of Law. As of 2019, McLeay is an Emeritus Professor and is currently researching the politics of prisoners' voting rights.

== Public academic ==
In 2010, McLeay co-signed a letter alongside 26 other constitutional experts, criticising the Canterbury Earthquake Response and Recovery Act 2010 which was passed after the 2010 Canterbury earthquake. In 2018, McLeay was part of a group of 19 law and politics academics who criticised the so-called "waka jumping" Bill, which was part of the Labour-NZ First Coalition Agreement. In both instances, McLeay and the constitutional experts were concerned about executive overreach, and the diminishing role of Parliamentary conventions.

In addition to the above, McLeay has submitted evidence to the House of Representatives on both the 2010 Electoral (Finance Reform and Advance Voting) Bill and the 2011 review of the Parliamentary Standing Orders.

== Books ==
McLeay's books include:

- The cabinet and political power in New Zealand (Oxford University Press, 1995)
- New Zealand Under MMP: A New Politics? (with Jonathan Boston, Stephen Levine and Nigel S. Roberts, Auckland University Press, 1996)
- Rethinking Women and Politics: New Zealand and Comparative Perspectives (ed. with Kate McMillan and John Leslie, Victoria University Press, 2009)
- What's the Hurry? Urgency in the New Zealand Legislative Process 1987-2010 (with Claudia Geiringer and Polly Higbee, Victoria University Press, 2011)
- In Search of Consensus: New Zealand’s Electoral Act 1956 and its Constitutional Legacy (Victoria University Press, 2018).

== Personal life ==
Her partner is Les Holborow.
