= Khylee Quince =

New Zealand criminal lawyer and academic

Khylee Quince is a New Zealand lawyer and academic in the field of criminal law.

== Biography ==
Quince practised in criminal and family law for three years, and in 1998 was appointed to the University of Auckland Law School. She teaches criminal law, advanced criminal law and youth justice.

In 2014, she and Alison Cleland co-authored Youth Justice in Aotearoa New Zealand and she has contributed to many legal texts including Feminist Judgments of Aotearoa New Zealand.

In 2020, Quince was appointed Dean of Law at Auckland University of Technology. She is the first dean of law of Māori descent at a New Zealand university.

Quince also serves as chair of the New Zealand Drug Foundation, the Sursum Foundation charitable trust and as a trustee on school boards. She is often engaged as an expert consultant by government and non-government organisations, including the Ministry of Justice, Department of Corrections, New Zealand Police and TVNZ. She is currently a member of the New Zealand Parole Board.

Quince is of Māori descent, and affiliates to Te Roroa, Ngāpuhi and Ngāti Porou iwi.
