= Janine Hayward =

New Zealand politics academic

- Born: Janine Alyth Deaker Hayward; 1969 (age 56–57)
- Relatives: Vera Hayward (great aunt)

Academic background
- Education: Victoria University of Wellington
- Thesis: In Search of a Treaty Partner: Who, or What, is 'the Crown'? (1995)
- Doctoral advisor: Elizabeth McLeay

Academic work
- Discipline: Political science
- Sub-discipline: Treaty of Waitangi politics; New Zealand's constitution
- Institutions: University of Otago

Janine Alyth Deaker Hayward (born 1969) is a New Zealand politics academic. She is currently a full professor at the University of Otago.

Hayward is the granddaughter of Jock Hayward, who was registrar of the University of Otago from 1948 to 1974.

== Academic career ==
Hayward completed her undergraduate degrees at the University of Canterbury and Victoria University of Wellington. In 1995, Hayward completed her PhD, with her thesis In Search of a Treaty Partner: Who, or What, is 'the Crown'?

She moved to the University of Otago, where she rose to full professor in 2016. Hayward's inaugural Professorial lecture was titled Te Tiriti o Waitangi, the Constitution, and our political imagination, and was delivered in November 2017. Hayward is currently the Head of the Politics Department at the University of Otago.

In 2018, Hayward gave a public lecture to celebrate 125 years of suffrage in New Zealand.

== Outside of academia ==
Hayward is the Chairwoman of the College Fellows of Hayward College, a residential hall named after her grandfather and great-aunt.

As Hayward is an expert on constitutional and Treaty of Waitangi politics, as well as electoral systems, Hayward comments on New Zealand elections often.

Hayward has submitted evidence to numerous pieces of legislation in the select committee phase, including the referendum that was held to decide whether or not New Zealand should change its flag, amongst others.

== Selected works ==
- Hayward, Janine. "Appendix: The principles of the Treaty of Waitangi." Rangahaua Whanui National Overview Report 2 (1997).
- Hayward, Janine, and Nicola Wheen, eds. The Waitangi Tribunal: Te Roopu Whakamana i te Tiriti o Waitangi. Bridget Williams Books, 2016.
- Hayward, Janine, ed. Local government and the Treaty of Waitangi. Oxford University Press, USA, 2003.
- Wheen, Nicola Rowan, and Janine Hayward, eds. Treaty of Waitangi settlements. Bridget Williams Books, 2012.
- Hayward, Janine. "Local government and Maori: Talking Treaty?." Political Science 50, no. 2 (1999): 182–194.
