= Aroha Harris =

New Zealand historian and writer

Aroha Harris MNZM
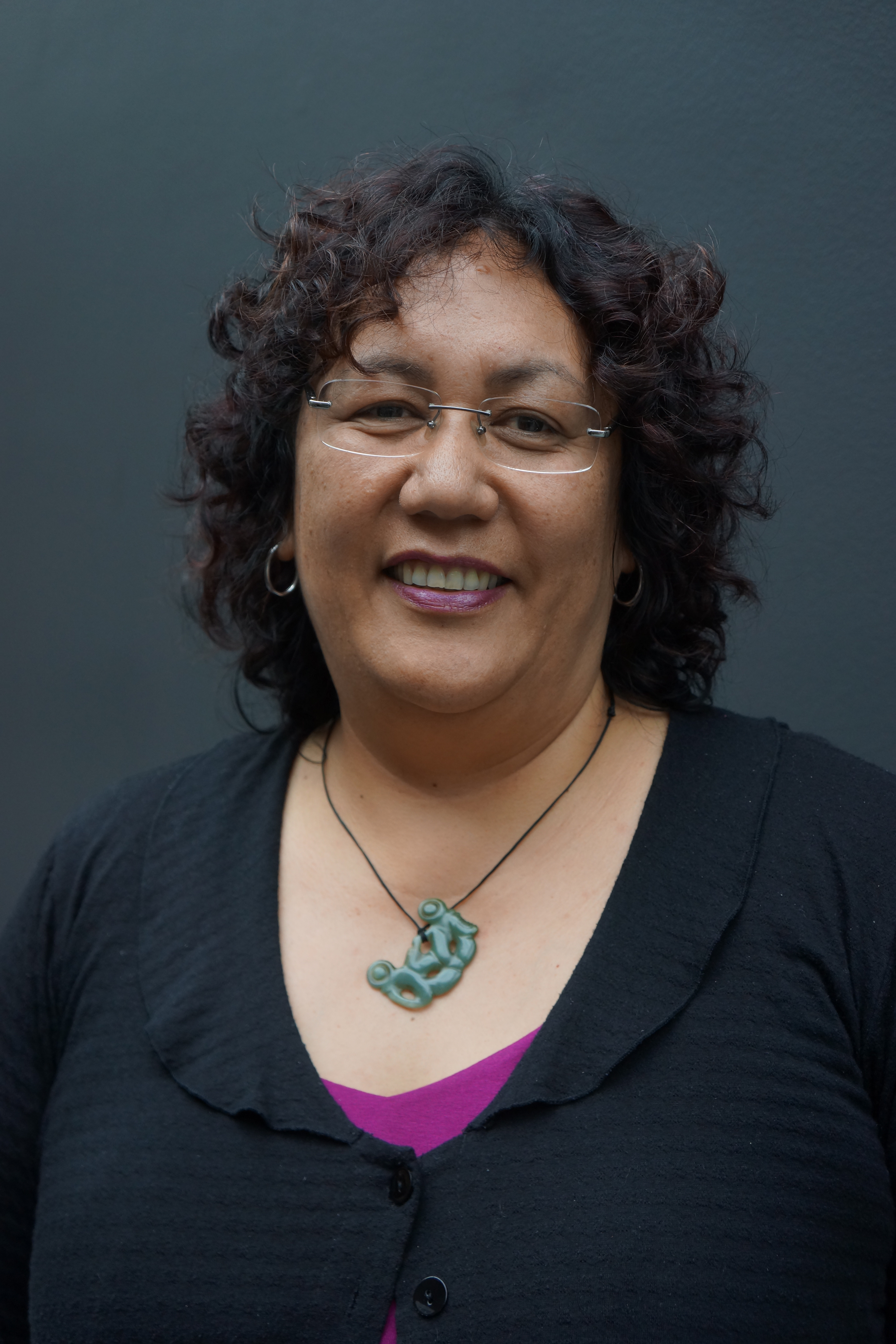
- At 2012 Frankfurt Book Fair
- Born: 1963 (age 62–63); Auckland, New Zealand

Academic background
- Education: Massey University; University of Auckland
- Thesis: Dancing with the state: Māori creative energy and policies of integration, 1945–1967 (2007)

Academic work
- Discipline: Māori and iwi history
- Institutions: University of Auckland; Waitangi Tribunal

Aroha Gaylene Harris MNZM (born 1963) is a Māori (Te Rarawa, Ngāpuhi) academic. As of 2020, Harris is an associate professor at the University of Auckland, specialising in Māori histories of policy and community development. She is also a member of the Waitangi Tribunal.

== Early life ==
Harris was born in Auckland in 1963, to parents Margaret (née Leef) and Milton Harris, a truck driver. She grew up in Te Atatū South, and was educated at St Joseph's Māori Girls' College in Napier, before completing her final year of high school at Auckland Girls' Grammar School. She credits her paternal grandmother, Violet Otene Harris, a Ngāpuhi and Mormon, as having a significant influence on her during childhood.

== Academic career ==
Harris has said that she studied history "partly because she’s a 'failed novelist' who wanted to write and be a storyteller". She earned a Bachelor of Arts degree in Māori studies at the University of Auckland in 1989, and went on to complete an MPhil in social policy at Massey University titled Maori land development schemes, 1945–1974, with two case studies from the Hokianga in 1996. After a PhD titled Dancing with the state: Māori creative energy and policies of integration 1945–1967 at the University of Auckland in 2007, Harris was employed at the University of Auckland, where she is an associate professor.

Harris was a founding member of Te Pouhere Kōrero, the New Zealand national association for Māori historians. She is a co-editor of the Te Pouhere Kōrero journal.

Her first book, Hikoi: Forty Years of Māori Protest, was published in 2004. It described political protest in the second half of the twentieth century, showing that individual protests are part of a cohesive movement.

She was appointed as a member of the Waitangi Tribunal in 2008, and is a member of the Te Rohe Potae (Wai 898) panel.

== Honours and awards ==
In 2017 Harris was selected as one of the Royal Society Te Apārangi's 150 women in 150 words, celebrating the contributions of women to knowledge in New Zealand.

Tangata Whenua: an illustrated history, a book co-authored with Judith Binney and Atholl Anderson, won the Royal Society Science Book Prize in 2015, and the illustrated non-fiction category award in the 2016 Ockham New Zealand Book Awards. In 2025, Tangata Whenua and Hikoi were listed in Books of Mana as 2 of the 180 most significant works of Māori-authored non-fiction.

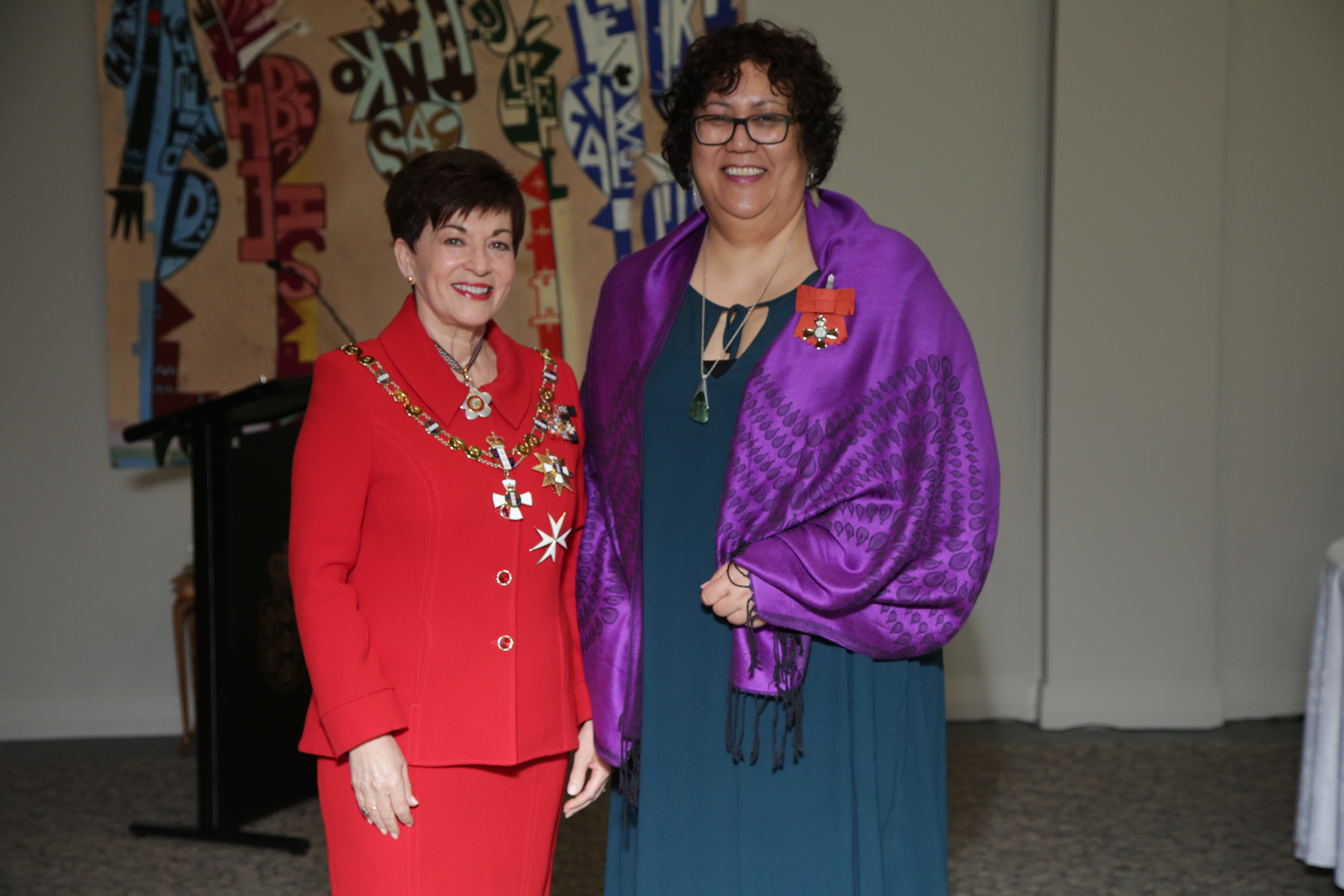
Harris (right), after her investiture as a Member of the New Zealand Order of Merit by the governor-general, Dame Patsy Reddy, at Government House, Auckland, on 22 July 2020

In the 2020 New Year Honours, Harris was appointed a Member of the New Zealand Order of Merit, for services to Māori and historical research.

A special Outstanding Contribution to Māori History award was given to Harris in 2021 at the New Zealand Historical Association Conference.

== Selected works ==
- Harris, Aroha G.; Waitangi Tribunal Division (1996). Crown acquisition of confiscated and Maori land in Taranaki, 1872–1881. Wellington: Waitangi Tribunal. ISBN 978-1-86956-160-4. OCLC 156739428. Wikidata Q105037711.
- Harris, Aroha G.; Melissa Matutina Williams; Anderson, Atholl John (2017). Tangata whenua: an illustrated history. Part three.: Te Ao Hurihuri: the changing world, 1920–2014. Wellington: Bridget Williams Books. ISBN 978-1-988533-45-2. OCLC 1108077788. Wikidata Q105037712.
- Harris, Aroha G. (2004). Hīkoi: forty years of Maori protest (in English and English). Wellington: Huia Publishers. ISBN 978-1-86969-101-1. LCCN 2005363354. OCLC 253321388. Wikidata Q105037714.
- Harris, Aroha G.; New Zealand Health Information Service; Health Research and Analytical Services; Population Health Services Section (1994), Measuring the effectiveness of health services for Maori consumers, Wellington: Ministry of Health, OCLC 152419248, Wikidata Q105037715
