= Huia Publishers =

New Zealand book publisher

Huia Publishers is a New Zealand publishing company based in Wellington, established in 1991. Huia publishes material in Māori and English for adults and children, including graphic novels, picture books, chapter books, novels and resources for kura kaupapa Māori (Māori language schools).

== Background ==
Huia was founded by Robyn Rangihuia Bargh and her husband Brian Bargh in 1991 in response to a lack of publishers focused on telling Māori stories with a Māori worldview. Bargh won the inaugural Te Tohu Toi Kē a Te Waka Toi award from Creative New Zealand in 2006 for 'making a difference in the literary sector.'

Along with the Māori Literature Trust, Huia have run the Te Papa Tupu programme that supports Māori writers to develop their skills.

In 2022 the Aotearoa New Zealand Festival programmed an event Thirty Years of HUIA with the then-directors of Huia, Eboni Waitere (Ngāti Kahungunu, Rangitāne) and Brian Morris (Ngāti Kahungunu, Rongowhakaata) and co-founder Robyn Bargh.

== Awards and recognition ==
In 2022, Huia was a finalist for the Bologna Prize for the Best Children’s Publisher of the Year at the annual Bologna Children's Book Fair in Italy. In 2024, Huia won the award.
