= List of honorary doctors of the University of Otago =

The list of Honorary Doctors of the University of Otago below shows the recipients of honorary doctorates bestowed by the University of Otago since 1962. Prior to this date honoris causa were conferred by the University of New Zealand; see the list of honorary doctors of the University of New Zealand.

Year	Recipient	Degree
1962	Robert J. T. Bell	LLD
1962	Percy Gowland	DSc
1962	Charles Hercus	LLD
1962	Hubert Ryburn	LLD
1962	Harry Skinner	LittD
1963	Charles Brasch	LittD
1963	Esmond de Beer	LittD
1965	Dick Willett	DSc
1967	Elizabeth Gregory	LLD
1967	Frederick Soper	DSc
1968	Muriel Bell	DSc
1968	Arthur Porritt	LLD
1968	Carl Smith	LLD
1969	Robert Aitken	LLD
1969	Harold Barrowclough	LLD
1969	Jack Bates	LLD
1969	Arthur Beacham	LLD
1969	John Beaglehole	LittD
1969	Clarence Beeby	LLD
1969	Basil Bibby	DSc
1969	Charles Coulson	DSc
1969	Derek Denny-Brown	DSc
1969	Jock Hayward	LLD
1969	Allen Johnston	LLD
1969	John A. Lee	LLD
1969	Douglas Lilburn	MusD
1969	William Morrell	LittD
1969	John Robson	LLD
1970	Arnold Nordmeyer	LLD
1972	Herbert Purves	DSc
1972	Robin Williams	LLD
1973	Kamisese Mara	LLD
1974	Jack Holloway	DSc
1975	Charles Burns	DSc
1975	Ronald Christie	LLD
1975	Eric D'Ath	DSc
1975	Russell Fraser	DSc
1975	Edward Sayers	DSc
1975	Horace Smirk	DSc
1975	John Stallworthy	DSc
1975	John Walsh	DSc
1975	Stanley Wilson	DSc
1976	Lloyd Geering	DD
1976	Harold Turner	DD
1978	Janet Frame	LittD
1978	Ruth Dallas	LittD
1978	John Harris	LLD
1978	Stuart Sidey	LLD
1979	Terry Rodgers	DSc
1979	Jack Somerville	LLD
1979	Garfield Todd	LLD
1981	Charles, Prince of Wales	LittD
1982	Maurice Joel	LLD
1984	Dan Davin	LittD
1984	Norman Davis	LittD
1989	Allan Wilson	DSc
1990	Shridath Ramphal	LLD
1990	Bruce Robertson	LLD
1990	Jim Valentine	LLD
1993	Silvia Cartwright	LLD
1993	Robin Irvine	LLD
1993	Haji Sulaiman bin Haji Daud	LLD
1993	Iona Williams	LLD
1994	Neville Bain	LLD
1994	Dorothy Fraser	LLD
1994	Douglas Girvan	LLD
1994	Alan Horsman	LittD
1994	Ralph Hotere	LLD
1994	William Southgate	MusD
1995	William Fyfe	DSc
1996	James Ng	LittD
1996	Peter Tapsell	LLD
1997	Murray Brennan	DSc
1997	Frank Holmes	LLD
1997	Alison Holst	DSc
1997	Mazlan binti Othman	DSc
1998	Judith Mayhew	LLD
1998	Judith Medlicott	LLD
1998	Hone Tuwhare	LittD
1999	Annette Baier	LittD
1999	Geoffrey Cox	LittD
1999	George Griffiths	LittD
1999	Julian Jack	DSc
2000	George Knight	DD
2000	Ian McDonald	DSc
2000	John Mackie	DSc
2000	Leo Moggie	LLD
2000	George Petersen	DSc
2000	Graham Stanton	DD
2001	Ahmad Azizuddin Bin Zainal Abidin	LLD
2001	Shona Dunlop MacTavish	LittD
2002	Christopher de Hamel	LittD
2002	Allan Hubbard	LLD
2003	Eion Edgar	LLD
2004	Graeme Fogelberg	LLD
2004	Paratene Ngata	LLD
2005	Thomas Davis	LLD
2005	Bill Manhire	LittD
2005	Michael Stedman	LLD
2005	Jeremy Waldron	LLD
2006	Malcolm Grant	LLD
2006	Beryl Howie	DSc
2007	John Gavin	DSc
2007	John Hall-Jones	LLD
2007	Mary McAleese	LLD
2007	Patricia Payne	MusD
2007	Mary Ronnie	LittD
2007	Robert Webster	DSc
2008	Lindsay Brown	LLD
2008	Mason Durie	LLD
2008	Ted McCoy	LLD
2008	Cilla McQueen	LittD
2009	Barbara Anderson	LittD
2009	Michael Cullen	LLD
2009	Shirley Murray	LittD
2009	Paul Oestreicher	DD
2009	Trevor Scott	LLD
2010	James Flynn	DSc
2010	Marilynn Webb	LLD
2011	David Skegg	LLD
2011	Brian Turner	LittD
2013	Audrey Eagle	DSc
2013	Helen Heslop	DSc
2014	Christine French	LLD
2014	Peter Gluckman	DSc
2014	Alan Mark	DSc
2014	Graeme Marsh	DCom
2015	Ian Farrant	DCom
2017	Stanley Paris	LLD
2017	Graeme Hart	DCom
2018	John Ward	LLD
2018	Norman Geary	DCom
2019	Forrest Miller	LLD
2019	Bridget Williams	LittD
2019	Bill English	LLD
2019	Viopapa Annandale-Atherton	LLD
2019	Atholl Anderson	LLD
2019	Brigid Inder	LLD
2019	Bill Robertson	DSc
2019	John Judge	DCom
2019	Clive Ross	LLD
2019	Julian Smith	LLD
2019	Carla Van Zon	LLD
2019	Bridget Williams	LittD
2021	Harlene Hayne	LLD
2022	Royden Somerville	LLD
2022	Ian Taylor	DCom
2023	Donald Malcolm McRae	LLD
2023	Mindy Chen-Wishart	LLD
2023	Wilson Isaac	LLD
2023	Mai Chen	LLD
2024	Richard Faull	DSc
2024	Stephen Higgs	LLD
2024	Linda Holloway	LLD
2024	Helen Nicholson	LLD
2025	Ulu Aiono	DCom
2025	Richard Blaikie	DSc
2025	John Broughton	DSc
2025	Edward Ellison	LLD
2025	David Gerrard	DSc
2025	Joji Malani	DSc
2025	David Paterson	LLD
2025	Dinah Reddihough	DSc
2025	Margaret Sparrow	DSc
2026	Jonathan Lemalu	MusD
2026	Jocelyn Harris	LittD
2026	Aseta Redican	DSc
