= 1965 New Zealand bravery awards =

The 1965 New Zealand bravery awards were announced via two special honours lists dated 20 April and 23 September 1965, and recognised two men for their actions when three boys were trapped in a water main tunnel in the Wellington suburb of Khandallah in June 1964. Further bravery awards were also included in that year's New Year and Queen's Birthday Honours.

== British Empire Medal (BEM) ==
Civil division, for gallantry

- David Bryan John Painter – constable, New Zealand Police; of Wellington.

In recognition of his great courage and tenacious devotion to duty during rescue operations at a tunnel at Khandallah on the evening of Sunday the 14th day of June 1964.

== Queen's Commendation for Brave Conduct ==
- Donald William Jones – of Linden

In recognition of his gallant services during rescue operations when three boys were trapped in a water main tunnel at Khandallah on the evening of Sunday, 14 June 1964.
