= Lindsay Brown =

Lindsay Brown may refer to:

- Lindsay Brown (baseball) (1911–1967), American baseball player
- Lindsay Brown (accountant) (1943/1944–2020), New Zealand accountant
