= Jocelyn Harris =

New Zealand Jane Austen scholar; co-founder of Dunedin Collective for Woman

Jocelyn Harris CNZM
- Born: Jocelyn Margaret Wood; 1939 (age 86–87); Dunedin, New Zealand
- Title: Professor Emerita
- Board member of: TVNZ
- Relatives: Angus Ross (stepfather)
- Awards: LittD (honoris causa) (Otago); Companion of the New Zealand Order of Merit; Chevalier de l'ordre de Mérite

Academic background
- Education: PhD, Birkbeck, University of London
- Thesis: Sir Charles Grandison and the Little Senate : the relation between Samuel Richardson's correspondence and his last novel (1966)

Academic work
- Discipline: English literature
- Sub-discipline: 18th-century English literature
- Institutions: University of Otago
- Main interests: 18th-century literature; Women's literature; Jane Austen
- Notable works: The History of Sir Charles Grandison (as editor); Jane Austen and the Art of Memory
- Website: www.jocelynharris.co.nz

Jocelyn Margaret Harris CNZM (née Wood; born 1939) is a New Zealand academic known for her studies of Jane Austen's creative process, and for her promotion of the teaching and study of women's literature at the University of Otago.

Harris was a founding member of the Dunedin Collective for Woman, and from 1970 until 2005 taught at the University of Otago, of which she remains professor emerita.

Harris is a Companion of the New Zealand Order of Merit and a Chevalier de l'ordre de Mérite. The University of Otago awarded her an honorary Doctor of Literature degree in 2026.

== Personal life ==
Harris was born Jocelyn Margaret Wood in 1939 in Dunedin, where her father, Win Wood, was a school-teacher and her mother Margot (née Garrett) was an Otago history graduate and radio presenter. Harris was raised by her mother after her father died as an artillery major in North Africa. In 1950 Margot remarried military historian Angus Ross, who later became Otago's professor of history.

Jocelyn attended Otago Girls' High School, then followed her mother and step-father into study at the University of Otago. As an undergraduate, she was elected "lady vice-president" of the Student Association in 1961.

She studied for her PhD at Birkbeck College, University of London, where her title was 'Sir Charles Grandison and the Little Senate: the relation between Samuel Richardson's correspondence and his last novel'. In 1970 she returned to Dunedin to take up a faculty role at Otago's Department of English.

== Academic career ==
In her teaching and as a senior academic, Harris 'almost single-handedly established a place for the academic study of women's writing and in particular, contemporary New Zealand women's writing within the full spectrum of studies in "English" literature offered at the University of Otago.'

In her own academic writing, it was Harris' analysis of Austen's debt to Richardson in her Jane Austen and the Art of Memory that established her standing as a scholar of international reputation. That was followed by A revolution almost beyond expression: Jane Austen's Persuasion in 2007, and Satire, Celebrity, and Politics in Jane Austen in 2017. Her first major publication was the 1972 edition of The History of Sir Charles Grandison for Oxford University Press.

Harris also served as a representative for academic staff on the Otago University Council, and was the first president of the Otago University Staff Women's Caucus.

Harris was appointed a Companion of the New Zealand Order of Merit, for services to education, in the 2009 New Year Honours.

The University of Otago awarded Harris the degree of LittD (honoris causa) in August 2026.

== Community service ==
Harris was one of the founding members of the Dunedin Collective for Woman. In the 1980s, she was a panelist on the 'agony aunt' television series Beauty and the Beast. Harris served on the board of Television New Zealand in the 1990s. Her work as the honorary consul for France in Dunedin was recognised by the award of Chevalier of the National Order of Merit.

Harris was also involved in many protest movements including the Save Aramoana Campaign.

== Works ==
=== Authored books ===
- Harris, J. (2017) Satire, Celebrity, and Politics in Jane Austen, Bucknell University Press. ISBN 9781611488395
- Harris, J. (2007) A revolution almost beyond expression: Jane Austen's Persuasion. Newark, DE: University of Delaware Press, 280p. ISBN 9780874139662
- Harris, J. M. (2003) Jane Austen's Art of Memory. Cambridge University Press, 271p. ISBN 9780521542074
- Harris, J. M. (1987) Samuel Richardson Cambridge University Press. ISBN 9780521315425

=== Edited books ===
- Zunshine, L., & Harris, J. (eds.). (2006). Approaches to teaching the novels of Samuel Richardson. New York: The Modern Language Association of America, 216p.
- Harris, J. M. (ed.). (2001). Samuel Richardson,The History of Sir Charles Grandison (3 parts). Reprint, Dunedin: Otago University Printery (under licence from Oxford University Press), 681p. ISBN 0192817450
- Waite, G. G., Harris, J. M., Murray, H. M., & Hale, J. K. (eds.). (1998). World and Stage: Essays for Colin Gibson. Dunedin: Otago Studies in English 6, 280p.

== See also ==
- Gibson, Colin; Marr, Lisa (eds.). New Windows on a Woman's World: Essays for Jocelyn Harris. Otago Studies in English 9. University of Otago, 2005. ISBN 1-877139-89-0
- List of honorary doctors of the University of Otago
