= Andrée Lévesque =

Canadian historian (born 1939)

Andrée Lévesque Professor Emerita
- Born: 1939 (age 86–87)

Academic background
- Education: Duke University

Academic work
- Discipline: History
- Sub-discipline: History of 20th-century Quebec, history of the political Left, Women's history
- Institutions: University of Otago, University of Ottawa, McGill University
- Notable works: Éva Circé-Côté, libre-penseuse

Andrée Lévesque (born 1939) is a historian specialising in the 20th century history of Québec, the history of the political Left, and women's history. After studies in geography at the University of Montreal and the Université Laval, she gained her Masters and PhD at Duke University.

She lived for eight years in New Zealand, where she was a founding member of the Dunedin Collective for Woman and taught women's history at the University of Otago in 1975 and 1976. She taught at the University of Ottawa from 1978 to 1984, then at McGill University of which she remains Professor Emerita. In 1996, she taught at the Université libre de Bruxelles (Free University of Brussels) in the group chaired by Suzanne Tassier.

Her works focus on marginalised groups and individuals, whether political groups such as the Communist Party of Canada and Québec, or social groups such as convicted women. Her inquiry into the history of resistance to the established order are exemplified by her biographies of the communist militant Jeanne Corbin and of the québécoise free-thinker Éva Circé-Côté.

Lévesque is a member of the Groupe d'histoire de Montréal. She is a founder of the Archive of Past Memories (Archives Passe-Mémoires) that collects autobiographical writings.

== Works ==
- Les filles de Jeanne: Histoires de vies anonymes, 1658-1915. Montréal, Éditions du Remue-Ménage, 2024.
- Chroniques d’Éva Circé-Côté. Lumière sur la société québécoise, 1900–1942. Montréal, Éditions du Remue-Ménage, 2012.
- Éva Circé-Côté, libre-penseuse, Montréal, Éditions du Remue-ménage, 2010. Prix Clio 2011 de la Société historique du Canada.
- « Militer », Éliane Gubin (et al.), Le Siècle des féminismes, Éditions de l’Atelier, Paris, 2004.
- Madeleine Parent militante, edited by A. Lévesque. Éditions du remue-ménage, Montréal, 2003.
- Scènes de la vie en rouge. L’époque de Jeanne Corbin (1906–1944). Éditions du Remue-ménage, Montréal, 1999.
- Résistance et transgression. Études en histoire des femmes au Québec, Éditions du Remue-ménage, Montréal, 1995.
- La Norme et les déviantes. Des femmes au Québec pendant l'entre-deux-guerres, Editions du remue-ménage, Montréal, 1989.
- Virage à gauche interdit. Les communistes, les socialistes et leurs ennemis au Québec, 1929–1939, Montréal, Boréal, 1984.
- Co-edited with David Sheppard, Norman Bethune: His Time and His Legacy. Norman Bethune son époque et son héritage, Ottawa, Canadian Association of Public Health, 1982.
- Co-edited with Kathy Arnup and R. Pierson, Delivering Motherhood: Ideology and Maternal Practice in 19th and 20th Century Canada, London, Croom Helm, Routledge Keagan Paul, 1989.

== Translations ==
- Red Travellers. Jeanne Corbin and her Comrades, Montréal & Kingston, McGill-Queen’s University Press. (Translation of Scènes de la vie en rouge. L’époque de Jeanne Corbin (1906–1944) by Y. Klein), 2006. Robert Kenny Prize 2008.
- Editor, Madeleine Parent Activist, Toronto, Sumac Press, 2005.
- Making and Breaking the Rules. Women in Quebec, 1919–1939, Toronto, McClelland & Stewart. (Translation of La Norme et les déviantes by Y. Klein), 1994.

== Sources ==
- « Éva Circé-Côté : une vie à contre-courant », interview with Andrée Lévesque, author of Éva Circé-Côté libre penseuse 1871–1949, Canal Savoir, 3 novembre 2011. https://www.youtube.com/watch?v=escV7JeKUhE
- Jean-François Nadeau, « Une Tête à Papineau – Éva Circé-Côté », by Andrée Lévesque. Le Devoir, 29 mai 2010.
- Michel Lapierre, « Le feu méconnu d’Éva Circé-Côté », Le Devoir, 12 novembre 2011.
- Michel Pigenet, « Andrée Lévesque. Scènes de la vie en rouge. L’époque de Jeanne Corbin». Le Mouvement social, no 199, 2002.
- Phyllis Senese, « La Norme et les déviantes, Andrée Lévesque », The Canadian Historical Review, 1990.
