= Mary Ronnie =

New Zealand librarian (1926–2023)

Mary Ronnie QSO
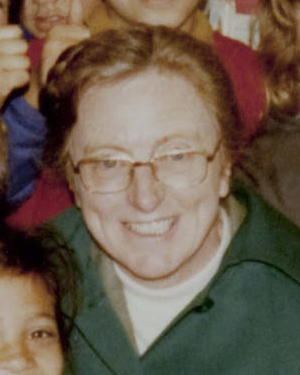
- Ronnie in 1978

New Zealand National Librarian
- In office 1976–1981

Personal details
- Born: Mary Allan Ronnie; 12 June 1926 Glasgow, Scotland
- Died: 17 March 2023 (aged 96)
- Spouse: Peter O'Connor (m. 1981; died 1994)
- Education: University of Otago
- Occupation: Librarian; historian

Mary Allan Ronnie QSO (12 June 1926 – 17 March 2023) was a New Zealand librarian. She was New Zealand's first female National Librarian, from 1976 to 1981, and the first woman in the world to head a national library. Before becoming National Librarian she was head of Dunedin Public Library, and afterwards she served as Auckland City Librarian.

== Early life ==
Ronnie was born in Glasgow, Scotland, on 12 June 1926, emigrating as a child to Dunedin, New Zealand, with her family in 1937. She attended Arthur Street School and Otago Girls' High School. In 1942 she got her first job in a library, an after-school position, in Dunedin Public Library. There she was influenced by the City Librarian, Archie Dunningham, and Dorothy Neal White (author of books on children's literature). After leaving school, she enrolled at the University of Otago but, finding university study not to her liking, she obtained a full-time job in the public library. She was to return to university later, studying part-time and gaining a Bachelor of Arts in English, philosophy and history in 1951. She completed the Certificate of the New Zealand Library Association in 1946, and in 1952 spent a year studying at the Library School in Wellington. In 1965, she completed a Master of Arts degree in history part-time, while working in the library.

== Career ==
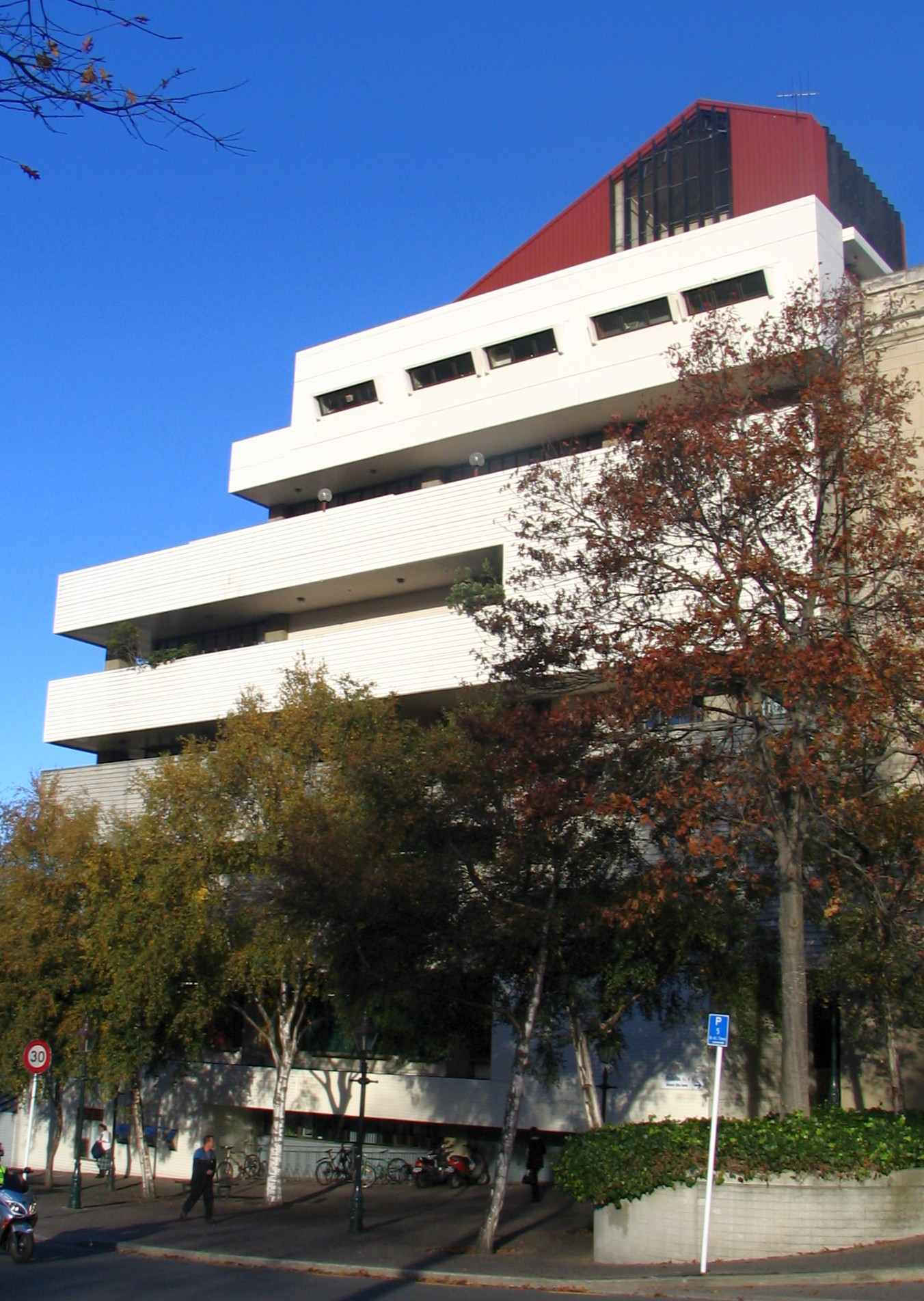
Dunedin Public Library 2016

Ronnie spent eight years as Head of Lending at Dunedin Public Library, a period that she regarded as one of her most productive. She gained overseas experience in branch libraries working in Glasgow for a year in 1960–61. In 1961, she became Deputy City Librarian in Dunedin, a position she held for eight years, succeeding Ada Fache in 1968 to become City Librarian. During her eight years in the latter position, she oversaw the building of a new library in Dunedin.

In 1976, Ronnie moved to Wellington to become National Librarian after being encouraged by colleagues to take up the position. Ronnie took early retirement from the National Library in 1981; she would have had to retire in 1986 as the government service stipulated retirement at age 60. Her early retirement was prompted by her marriage to Peter O'Connor, an associate professor of history at the University of Auckland, and her move to live in Auckland. Also, preparations were underway to build a new National Library, and she felt that the planning for the new building should be done by someone who would work in the building long-term.

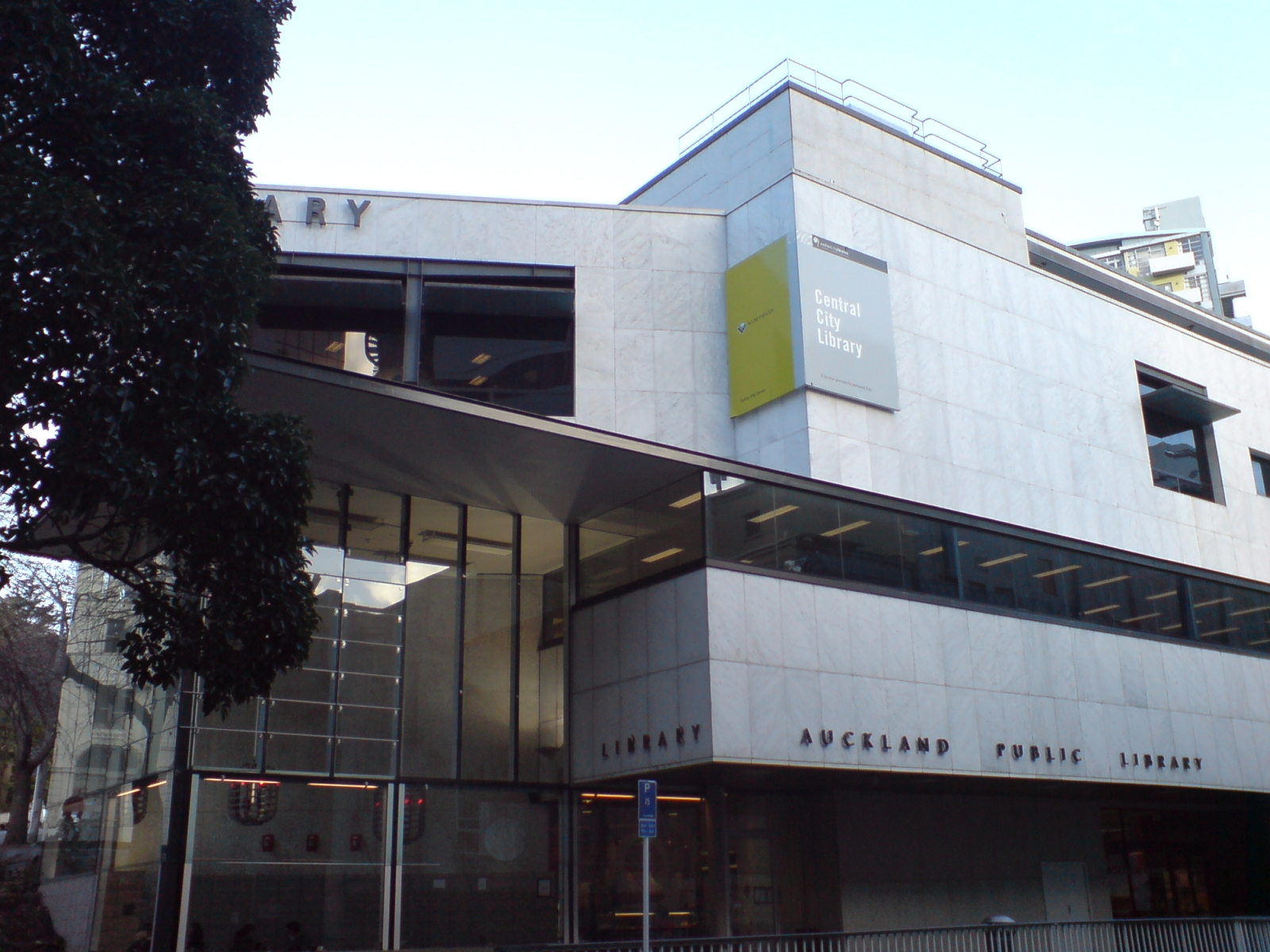
Auckland City Library 2008

After moving to Auckland, Ronnie became Auckland City Librarian from 1982 to 1984. In 1987, she joined the Graduate Department of Librarianship, Archives and Records at Monash University in Melbourne, serving as Head of Department and Acting Professor of the Department from 1989 to 1992.

From 1973 to 1974, Ronnie was president of the New Zealand Library Association. She also served on the University of Otago Council from 1974 to 1975.

Ronnie also wrote about libraries. Her writings included:

- a history of Otago and Southland libraries
- a history of Wellington Public Libraries
- histories of Dunedin Public Library
- the National Library Act 1965
- regional library services
- education for librarianship

Ronnie expressed her optimism about the future of public libraries both as a resource of printed materials but also for the opportunities afforded by digital technologies. She was a champion for public libraries as focal points in their communities, advocating that they be located where people are. She likened them to supermarkets with self-service and labelled items but with the additional feature of help when customers need it. In awarding her an honorary doctorate, David Skegg, the Vice-Chancellor of the University of Otago, recognised her commitment to high quality and accessible library services, her leadership in the library profession and her scholarship.

== Death ==
Ronnie died in Dunedin on 17 March 2023, at the age of 96.

== Honours and awards ==
In 1977, Ronnie was awarded the Queen Elizabeth II Silver Jubilee Medal. In the 1982 Queen's Birthday Honours, she was appointed a Companion of the Queen's Service Order for public services. She was conferred an honorary Doctorate of Literature (LittD) by the University of Otago in 2007, and received a Dunedin Public Libraries Citation in 2007.
