= Raylene Ramsay =

Researcher of French culture; in New Zealand

Professor Emerita Raylene Lammas Ramsay FNZAH FRSNZ

Academic background
- Education: MA (University of Otago); DU (University of Poitiers)

Academic work
- Discipline: French culture, French language
- Institutions: University of Auckland

Raylene Lammas Ramsay (born 1945) is a professor emerita of French culture, in New Zealand. She has published on avant-garde French novelists, French women politicians, and has translated Kanak poems and published a cultural history of New Caledonia. She is a Fellow of the New Zealand Academy of Humanities and was elected a Fellow of the Royal Society Te Apārangi in 2009.

== Education ==
Ramsay attended Otago Girls' High School, where she won a university entrance scholarship in 1964. She undertook doctoral studies under the direction of Ida Frandon (1907–1997) at the University of Poitiers, publishing her thesis, a study of the works of writer and film director Alain Robbe-Grillet, in 1972.

== Career ==
Ramsay has written extensively on the avant-garde novelists Nathalie Sarraute, Marguerite Duras, and Alain Robbe-Grillet, and the nature of their autobiographical writing. Ramsay's book Robbe-Grillet and Modernity: Science, Sexuality, and Subversion was published by the University Press of Florida in 1992, followed by The French New Autobiographies: Sarraute, Duras and Robbe-Grillet in 1996.

French Women in Politics, published in 2003, analysed the writings by and about French women politicians and included interviews with Huguette Bouchardeau, Simone Veil and Édith Cresson, among others.

Returning to New Zealand from North America in 1994, Ramsay was Head of the School of European Languages and Literatures at University of Auckland from 2000 to 2004. She expanded her focus to include Francophone languages of the Pacific, and published a translation of the poems of Kanak leader Déwé Gorodey, and other works on the cultural history of New Caledonia. Since her retirement in 2014, she has been Professor Emerita.

== Awards ==
Ramsay was made Chevalier dans l'Ordre des Arts et des Lettres in 2006, for her "outstanding contribution to French culture".

Ramsay is a Fellow of the New Zealand Academy of Humanities, and was elected Fellow of the Royal Society Te Apārangi in 2009.

== Personal life ==
Ramsay married veterinary surgeon and former All Black Michael O'Callaghan on 30 January 1971 in Poitiers, France.

== Selected publications ==
- Ramsay, Raylene, editor. Nights of Storytelling: A Cultural History of Kanaky-New Caledonia. University of Hawai’i Press, 2011.
- Ramsay, Raylene (1999). "Chapter 9. Postmodernism and the Monstrous Criminal". Detecting texts: the metaphysical detective story from Poe to postmodernism: 199–214. doi:10.9783/9780812205459.199. Wikidata Q109897263.
- Ramsay, Raylene (2008). "In the belly of the canoe with Ihimaera, Hulme and Gorod. The waka as a locus of hybridity". International Journal of Francophone Studies. 11 (4): 559–579. doi:10.1386/ijfs.11.4.559_1. Wikidata Q109897260.
- Gorode, Dewe, The Wreck (1 September 2011); Translated by Walker-Morrison, Deborah; Ramsay, Raylene L. ISBN 9781877484162 Little Island Press Ltd
