= Bridget Williams Books =

New Zealand book publisher

- Founded: 1990
- Founder: Bridget Williams
- Country of origin: New Zealand
- Headquarters location: Wellington, New Zealand
- Distribution: David Bateman Ltd
- Nonfiction topics: New Zealand history; Women's and Māori history; Contemporary topics
- Imprints: BWB Texts
- Official website: www.bwb.co.nz

Bridget Williams Books is a New Zealand book publisher, established in 1990 by Bridget Williams.

== Establishment ==
Williams established the company in 1990 when the company she was working for, Allen & Unwin, was sold. She purchased the titles which she had developed as Allen & Unwin's managing director and started her own publishing company. Williams' vision for the company was for it to publish "good books that sell" – books with significant messages. Her personal interests in women's and Māori history, and New Zealand general history, have influenced the books that the company publishes.

From 1995 to 1998, the company published under a joint imprint with Auckland University Press, before returning to independent publisher status in 1998.

== Development ==
In 2006, the company established the Bridget Williams Publishing Trust, which applies for grants from philanthropic organisations to support publication of specific titles. For example, in 2013 the J.R. McKenzie Trust provided funding towards the publication and promotion of Inequality – A New Zealand Crisis.

In 2011, Tom Rennie was hired as associate editor, and began to develop a digital publishing strategy for the company. As a result, in 2013, BWB Texts were released – a series of short texts on topics of New Zealand interest, published first as e-books and later as paperbacks. Certain titles in the series are funded by Creative New Zealand, and others are funded through the Bridget Williams Books Publishing Trust.

== Awards ==
- In 1996, Redemption Songs won Book of the Year at the Montana New Zealand Book Awards
- In 1997, The Story of Suzanne Aubert won Book of the Year at the Montana New Zealand Book Awards.
- In 2010, Encircled Lands: Te Urewera 1820–1921 won the NZ Post Book of the Year Award.
- In 2015, Tangata Whenua: An Illustrated History won the Royal Society of New Zealand Science Book Prize, and the Kōrero o Mua (History) category of the Ngā Kupu Ora Aotearoa Māori Book Awards
- In 2015, Bridget Williams Books won the NZ Book Industry Special Award, for the innovative publishing list and the expansion into digital publishing.
