= Olga Stringfellow =

New Zealand writer

- Born: Olga Elsa Brown; 4 June 1923; Dunedin, New Zealand
- Died: 1995
- Occupations: Journalist; writer
- Relatives: Peter Brown (brother)
- Writing career
- Genres: Romantic and historical fiction

Olga Elsa Stringfellow (née Brown; 4 June 1923 – 1995) was a New Zealand journalist and author of romantic and historical fiction.

== History ==
Stringfellow was born in Dunedin as Olga Elsa Brown on 4 June 1923. She was educated at the Otago Girls' High School in Dunedin, and the Elam School of Fine Arts.

She was married in 1943 (later divorced) and moved to the United Kingdom in 1949. After working in journalism, with the Modern Woman and The Sketch, and as a columnist for the Scottish Daily Express, she became an author. Her published works include the historical novels Mary Bravender (1960), set at the time of the New Zealand Wars, and A Gift for the Sultan (1962), based on the true account of a Scottish woman captured by pirates, sold into slavery, and eventually becoming a wife of the Sultan of Morocco.

Stringfellow was also a recognised touch healer. She counted Middle Eastern princes and New York millionaires amongst her patients.

During the 1970s, she lived returned to New Zealand, living on Auckland's North Shore.

In her later years, Stringfellow lived at Hartley Wintney, near Basingstoke, Hampshire.

Her brother Peter Brown was the leading New Zealand landscape artist.

== Written material ==
=== Books out of print ===
- Olga Stringfellow, Mary Bravender (1960)
- Olga Stringfellow, A Gift for the Sultan (1962)
