= Bob Walton (police commissioner) =

New Zealand police officer

Bob Walton CMG OBE QPM ED

22nd Commissioner of Police
- In office 1978–1983
- Preceded by: Ken Burnside
- Succeeded by: Ken Thompson

Personal details
- Born: Robert Josiah Walton; 8 December 1921 Auckland, New Zealand
- Died: 16 July 2008 (aged 86) Wellington, New Zealand
- Spouse: Marjorie Beryl Frost (m. 1947)
- Children: 1
- Education: Mount Albert Grammar School
- Occupation: Police officer

Robert Josiah Walton CMG OBE QPM ED (8 December 1921 – 16 July 2008) was a New Zealand police officer who served as Commissioner of Police between 1978 and 1983. His tenure was marked by the end of the Bastion Point occupation, the Mount Erebus disaster, the 1981 Springbok tour, and the Royal Commission of Inquiry into the convictions of Arthur Allan Thomas for the murders of Harvey and Jeannette Crewe.

Born in Auckland on 8 December 1921, Walton was educated at Mount Albert Grammar School. During World War II, he saw service in the Middle East, Italy and Japan, and later served in the Royal New Zealand Army Service Corps (Territorials), retiring as colonel commandant in 1986. In 1947, Walton married Marjorie Beryl Frost, and the couple went on to have one child.

Walton joined the New Zealand Police, and led the investigations into the Bassett Road machine gun murders in 1963. From 1966 to 1974, he headed the Criminal Investigation Branch, and in 1971 studied at the Royal College of Defence Studies in London. He served as deputy police commissioner from 1974 to 1978, and police commissioner from 1978 to 1983, when he retired.

In retirement, Walton lived in Wellington, and was president of the Wellington Bowling Centre between 1992 and 1993, and a member of the New Zealand Bowling Association council from 1993 to 1996. He died at his home in Wellington on 16 July 2008.

== Honours and awards ==
In 1953, Walton was awarded the Queen Elizabeth II Coronation Medal. In the 1965 Queen's Birthday Honours, he was appointed an Officer of the Order of the British Empire (Military). In 1977, he received the Queen Elizabeth II Silver Jubilee Medal. In the 1979 New Year Honours, he was awarded the Queen's Police Medal, and in the 1983 Queen's Birthday Honours, he was appointed a Companion of the Order of St Michael and St George.

Police appointments
| Preceded by Ken Burnside | Commissioner of Police of New Zealand; 1978–1983 | Succeeded by Ken Thompson |
