= Yoka Neuman =

New Zealand feminist and gay rights activist (1928–2021)

- Born: Johanna Maria Dijkstra; 21 June 1928; Singkep, Dutch East Indies
- Died: 21 November 2021 (aged 93); Dunedin, New Zealand
- Known for: Feminist and gay rights activism
- Spouse: Hans Neuman (m. 1956; died 1973)
- Partner(s): Jill Dunwoodie (from 1980; died 2008)
- Children: 3

Johanna Maria "Yoka" Neuman (née Dijkstra ; 21 June 1928 – 21 November 2021) was a New Zealand feminist and gay rights activist. Based in the Dunedin area, she was the founder of the Lesbian Mothers' Defence Fund and a founding member of the Dunedin Women's Refuge.

== Early life and family ==
Neuman was born Johanna Maria Dijkstra on the island of Singkep in the Dutch East Indies on 21 June 1928, the eldest of four children of Bertha and Abraham Jan Dijkstra. Her father, an engineer, worked at a tin mine on Singkep. Owing to her aversion to the Indonesian heat, Neuman was sent to Holland to live with her maternal grandparents in The Hague in 1937. In 1940, her mother and younger siblings joined her in Holland, which was shortly thereafter occupied by the German army. The family's home was requisitioned by the German forces in 1943 and the family was moved to Hengelo, where they experienced the Dutch famine of 1944–1945. Meanwhile, in 1942 her father had been imprisoned in a Japanese prisoner-of-war camp in Indonesia, and the family was reunited in Holland in 1945. Abraham Dijkstra ten years later.

After World War II, Yoka Dijkstra worked in various jobs: in bookshops in both England and Holland; as an au pair in England; and as a secretary in a Leiden ear, nose and throat clinic. It was there that she met Johannes Jacobus (Hans) Neuman, a medical student, in 1953, and they married in 1956. Their first child was born in the Netherlands in 1960

== Life in New Zealand ==
The Neuman family migrated to New Zealand in 1961, settling in Dunedin, where Hans had intended completing his medical studies. They had two more children, in 1962 and 1964. Hans and Yoka Neuman became naturalised New Zealand citizens in 1968. Hans Neuman worked as a psychiatric assistant at Seacliff Psychiatric Hospital, and died in 1973 after suffering a stroke.

As a mother with young children, Yoka Neuman became involved in community activities, including with her local playcentre and the Save Manapouri campaign. Following her husband's death, Neuman found part-time work as a hospital cleaner, but was obliged to give that up and receive a widow's benefit when the Department of Social Welfare became aware of her situation.

After the Royal Commission on Contraception, Sterilisation and Abortion was established in 1975, Neuman advocated for women's reproductive rights and supported the passing of the Contraception, Sterilisation, and Abortion Act 1977. In 1976, she was a founding member of the Dunedin Women's Refuge. Neuman studied at Logan Park High School in 1978 to receive her Sixth Form Certificate, as she had been unable to complete her high school education in Holland as high schools there were evacuated and closed during World War II.

In 1979, Neuman came out as lesbian, and the following year began a relationship with Jill Dunwoodie, a teacher at Tahuna Normal Intermediate School, and they remained together until Dunwoodie's death in 2008.

After coming out, Neuman advocated for the feminist and gay rights movements. She established the Lesbian Mothers' Defence Fund (LMDF) to support lesbian mothers in gaining custody of their children when leaving heterosexual relationships as a reaction to the submission by Families Need Fathers to the Guardianship Amendment Bill that sought to prevent children from being brought up in homosexual households. Through this, the legal term "domestic partnership" became more widely accepted in New Zealand. Neuman led the LMDF until 1992.

Neuman was part of the Dunedin Collective for Woman (from 1972), and helped establish Rape Crisis Dunedin and the Women's Resource Centre. She also supported the opening of New Zealand's first women's bookshop, Daybreak, in Dunedin, where she was a volunteer.

In 1990, Neuman received the New Zealand 1990 Commemoration Medal.

== Death ==
Neuman died at a rest home in Dunedin on 21 November 2021, at the age of 93.
