= Dunedin Collective for Woman =

1970s feminist group in New Zealand

- Formation: 1971
- Dissolved: 1982
- Purpose: Women's rights

The Dunedin Collective for Woman (DCW) was a feminist group active in Dunedin, New Zealand in the 1970s. Set up as an umbrella organisation for special interest groups and projects, its four foundational aims were equal pay, quality childcare, women's control of their own bodies, and an end to sex stereotyping.

In its ten years of existence, members of the Collective set up a preschool and a women's refuge, published books and exhibitions, and promoted better and legal access to fertility control and abortion services in New Zealand.

== Formation ==
The first eight members were Denny Boothe, Jocelyn Harris, Pat Lawson, Andrée Lévesque, Judith Medlicott, Edith Mercier, Penny Moore, and Diana Strang. Another notable member was founder of Lesbian Mothers' Defence Fund, Yoka Neuman.

The Collective was organised non-hierarchically, with shared decision-making and shared responsibilities. It ran from 1971 to 1982. As it grew, new cells of eight members were founded, each with a nucleus of experienced members. Growth was rapid; the Collective could call on over 80 active, committed members within a few years.

Some of the original members were academics or had accompanied academic husbands to America and Canada, and returned with radical ideas learnt from feminist groups agitating for change there.

== Activities ==
The Collective had a very active public profile. All members were encouraged to write and produce the “Woman” newsletter, and to stand up and speak at many different public engagements to numerous community groups. They participated in radio talkback shows, ran courses in Women’s Liberation and Women’s Studies, and protested particularly against beauty contests.

In a 1972 survey the DCW found that 75% of the public wanted liberalised abortion laws.

Collective members with a common interest in fertility control set up Knowhow, an advisory service on sexual matters, in 1973. First Sex, Second Sex was a published booklet on sex role stereotyping in learn-to-read books for school entrants. After New Zealand's abortion laws were tightened in 1975, Knowhow transformed into Sisters Overseas Service (SOS), helping women to go to Australia for abortions.

A preschool founded by the Collective in 1973 moved to a house in Frame Street in 1974, which it shared with a women's centre. Collective members and supporters protested outside the Supreme Court in Dunedin in 1974 on abortion law reform.

During International Women's Year (1975), the Collective produced the Cure-All-Ills All Star Travelling Women's Medicine Show.

Herstory, an exhibition on women in New Zealand history, led to the first Herstory Diary published in September 1976. For each week, the diary features words and pictures about a woman or an event involving women from New Zealand's past. The idea was new and popular, and has been continued in New Zealand.

Members were active in introducing a university extension women's studies course, became involved in the founding of the Dunedin Community Child Care Centre, and went on to set up Dunedin's first women's refuge.

Collective members opened New Zealand's first feminist bookshop, Daybreak, which ran for six years from 1976 to 1983. The name referred to a nineteenth-century New Zealand women's journal with a socialist and feminist viewpoint.

== Legacy ==
Ōtepoti Collective Against Sexual Abuse (ŌCASA) was founded as Rape Crisis Dunedin in 1980.

The Dunedin Community Child Care Centre has grown into a network of four centres, now called Pioneers.
