= Peter Brown (New Zealand artist) =

New Zealand artist (1921–2005)

Charles Fredrick Peter Brown (12 April 1921 – 14 October 2005) was a New Zealand born artist of the school of traditional realism.

Brown served in the RAF throughout World War II and the drawing and sketching he did while a German prisoner of war from 1943 helped him decide to pursue art seriously as a career. After escaping from the prison camp, and on returning to New Zealand, the Rehabilitation Department (an organisation set up to assist returned servicemen back into the workforce) assisted Brown to study commercial art and he began his training at the Elam Art School of the University of Auckland in 1946.

In 1948, Brown was asked to teach by Archie Fisher, then Head of the Elam Art School, so he became a part-time lecturer from 1948 to 1950, before he had even completed his studies. In 1951 he completed his studies, and he continued as a full-time lecturer at Elam from 1952 to 1959, when he left to undertake independent study and painting. During his time at Elam, he was an active participant in Elam's Rutland Group where he was known for his portrait painting.

He was invited to attend the Slade School of Art in London in 1960.

After returning to New Zealand, he settled in Napier and taught at the Hawkes Bay Art School. He was awarded the Kelliher Prize for Landscape Painting in 1974. He went on to move to Gisborne and was active in the Gisborne art community until shortly before his death in October 2005.

His sister Olga Stringfellow was a well-known journalist and novelist.

== Holdings ==
Peter Brown's artworks are held in the collections of the:

- Royal Scottish Academy
- Scottish National Portrait Gallery
- Royal Society of Portrait Artists
- Rutland Group (Auckland)
- New Group (Auckland)
- American Watercolor Society
- Chelsea Art Society
- Artists of Chelsea
- Army Art Society
