= Lisa Zunshine =

American scholar of literature and cognitive science

- Born: August 24, 1968 (age 57)
- Occupations: Writer, Literary scholar

Lisa Zunshine (born 24 August 1968) is an American literary scholar, who publishes in British literature, comparative literature, film/media studies, and cognitive literary theory. She is the author or editor of thirteen books, including Getting Inside Your Head: What Cognitive Science Can Tell Us about Popular Culture (Johns Hopkins UP, 2012),The Oxford Handbook of Cognitive Literary Studies (Oxford UP, 2015), and The Secret Life of Literature (MIT Press, 2022).

== Early life and education ==
Zunshine came to the United States as a refugee, from Latvia, when she was twenty-one, and became a U.S. citizen in 1998. She graduated with a Ph.D. from the University of California, Santa Barbara in 2000.

== Career ==
She is a retired professor of English at the University of Kentucky, Lexington, and was a Guggenheim fellow in 2007.

== Books ==
- Black Women’s Stories of Everyday Racism: Narrative Analysis for Social Change, with Simone Drake, Jim Phelan, and Robyn Warhol. 2024
- The Secret Life of Literature. 2022
- Getting Inside Your Head: What Cognitive Science Can Tell Us About Popular Culture. 2012
- The Oxford Handbook of Cognitive Literary Studies. 2015
- Approaches to Teaching the Works of John Dryden. Co-edited with Jayne Lewis. 2013
- Introduction to Cognitive Cultural Studies. 2010
- Acting Theory and the English Stage. 2008
- Strange Concepts and the Stories They Make Possible: Cognition, Culture, Narrative. 2008
- Why We Read Fiction: Theory of Mind and the Novel. 2006
- Approaches to Teaching the Novels of Samuel Richardson. Co-edited with Jocelyn Harris. 2006
- Philanthropy and Fiction. 2006
- Bastards and Foundlings: Illegitimacy in Eighteenth-Century England. 2005
- Nabokov at the Limits: Redrawing Critical Boundaries. 1999
