= John Gibbs Churchill =

New Zealand trade unionist, politician and mayor of Otaki

Jack Churchill OBE JP
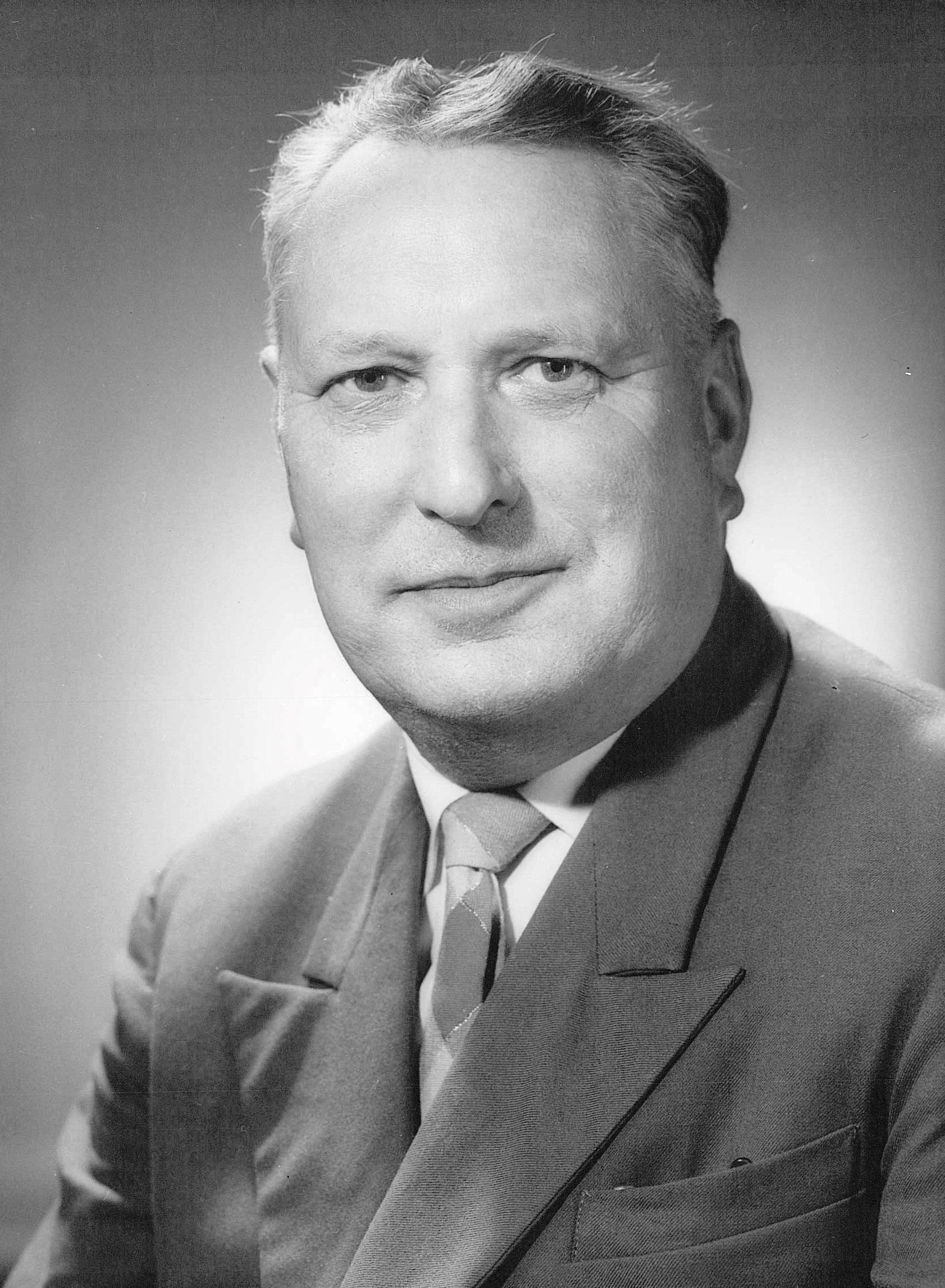
- Churchill c. 1960

7th Mayor of Otaki
- In office 1969–1975
- Preceded by: Otho Henry Edward Yates
- Succeeded by: Murray Scott

Personal details
- Born: 7 February 1905 Wellington, New Zealand
- Died: 2 December 1975 (aged 70) Ōtaki, New Zealand
- Party: Labour
- Spouse: Hilda Kate Barley (m. 1929)
- Profession: Mechanician

John Gibbs Churchill OBE JP (7 February 1905–2 December 1975) was a New Zealand trade unionist and local politician. For six years he was the mayor of Otaki.

== Biography ==
=== Early life and career ===
Churchill was born 7 February 1905 in Wellington. He was educated at Terrace School and then Wellington College. In 1929 he married Hilda Kate Barley. That same year he entered employment with the New Zealand Post Office as a Mechanician. He rose to become a Senior Mechanician and then a Departmental Welfare Officer.

Churchill was a leading figure in the New Zealand Post Office and Telegraph Association. In 1937 he was elected on to the executive of the association and two years later was elected as Vice-President. He then served as its President from 1943 to 1946 when he resigned to take up a position on the association's permanent staff as associate secretary. He later became General Secretary of the association from 1958 to 1964 when he retired. In 1960 Churchill went on a nine-week overseas visit in his capacity as General Secretary, primarily to attend a Post and Telegraph congress in Vienna as New Zealand's delegate. He also visited Canada, United States and United Kingdom to examine their post office conditions and automation.

=== Political career ===
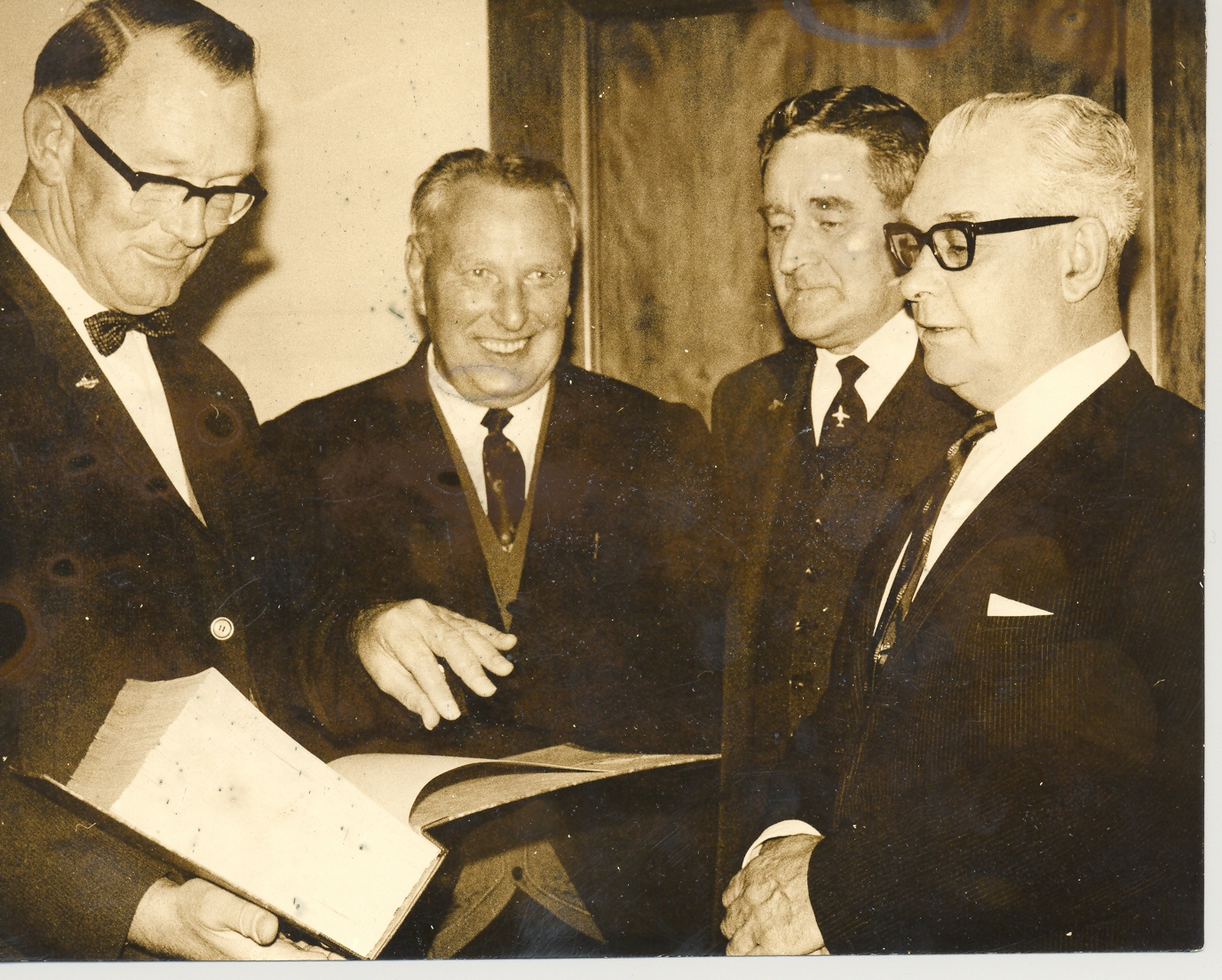
Churchill (centre-left) with Prime Minister Keith Holyoake in 1969

In 1950 Churchill won a seat on the Wellington City Council on a Labour ticket which he was to hold until 1964 when he decided not stand for re-election. He had twice stood for the council previously but been unsuccessful. Political scientist George Betts said Churchill was one of Wellington's most influential and competent councillors who bucked the trend which saw union secretaries regularly fail to be elected to local bodies. In 1957 Churchill suggested to the Town Clerk that the council design a flag for the city for official occasions and to be flown at civic buildings, parks and reserves. His suggestion was approved by the city's Public Relations & Cultural Committee leading to the City Council to subsequently adopt the idea of a city flag. The local newspaper The Evening Post were also enthusiastic for a city flag and, after a long period of public design submissions, one was found to be favourable by the City Council and the design was officially adopted as the flag of Wellington City in 1963.

He became leader of the Labour members on the council and was twice nominated for the position of deputy mayor. He lost in a ballot among fellow councillors to Harry Nankervis after the 1959 elections and again in 1962 to Denis McGrath (both from the Citizens' Association which held majorities on the council). Despite being in the minority on the council Churchill was elected chairman of the works committee and Citizens' councillors who were chairmen of the other committees would seldom make any decisions without consulting him. He suffered a heart attack in 1963, which contributed to his decision to retire from the city council in December 1964. The council decided against holding a by-election to fill the vacancy caused by his retirement and his vacated seat remained empty until the 1965 elections. An Evening Post editorial praised Churchill as possessing the ability to "get things done" with "consistently sound" judgment. It also stated he did not put party interests above the city's welfare earning the respect of opposition councillors; "The nod from Jack Churchill has, at times, meant more to the opposition than any support they might muster within their own ranks."

He stood for the Wellington Harbour Board unsuccessfully in 1956, polling higher than any other unsuccessful candidate. When a vacancy occurred on the board following the death of Sir Will Appleton, Churchill was expected to be awarded the vacated seat. However, he was defeated in a ballot of councillors eight votes to seven in favour of Nesbit Douglas Binnie (former general manager of Port Line) despite Binnie not having contested the previous election. Later an allegation surfaced that Citizens' Association members had met privately the morning before and had been influenced on nominating Binnie over Churchill. Churchill was later elected to the Harbour Board in 1962, remaining a member until 1971 when he was defeated. Despite leaving Wellington, he was elected to serve on the board in his final three terms as a representative for Wellington, the first person outside the city to represent it on that body.

He and his wife moved to Ōtaki in 1965 and in 1967 he was elected to the Otaki Borough Council in a by-election. In 1969 he stood for the mayoralty unopposed. He was similarly re-elected in the next two elections unopposed. He served as Mayor of Otaki until his death in 1975. While mayor he chaired a tense meeting in October 1970 to discuss proposed works estimated to cost $22,000. One councillor (H. W. Hakaraia) protested that he was not satisfied with the given answer to his question about the works. After an adjournment Churchill sought reassurance from Hakaraia that he would resume his seat and obey the meeting chair in future. Hakaraia did not agree and Churchill moved a motion he be suspended for the remainder of the meeting which was carried without dissent. Hakaraia refused to leave and the police were called to remove him.

=== Later life and death ===
In the 1965 Queen's Birthday Honours, Churchill was appointed an Officer of the Order of the British Empire, in recognition of his service as general secretary of the Post Office Association. In 1973 he was appointed to the newly-constituted board of trustees of the National Art Gallery, Museum and War Memorial having been nominated by local bodies. In May 1974, he was appointed to the board of the Wellington Savings Bank by the Third Labour Government.

Churchill died at his home in Ōtaki on 2 December 1975 aged 70. He was survived by his wife, son and five grandchildren.

== Honorific eponym ==
Churchill Park, located in Seatoun, was named after him in recognition of his many years as chairman of the Wellington City Council Reserves Committee. The now demolished Churchill Park in Ōtaki was likewise named after him.

== Publications by Churchill ==
- Churchill, J. G. (1955). Mr Chairman : a guide to chairmanship and meeting procedure. Wellington: Standard Press. OCLC 429794033.

== Notes ==
Political offices
Preceded by Otho Henry Edward Yates	Mayor of Otaki; 1969–1975	Succeeded by Murray Scott
Trade union offices
Preceded by Sam Mather	General Secretary of the Post Ofiice Association; 1958–1965	Succeeded by Ivan Reddish
