= Eric D'Ath =

New Zealand pathologist

Eric D'Ath CBE
- Born: Eric Frederick D'Ath; 25 March 1897; Pātea, New Zealand
- Died: 18 June 1979 (aged 82); Dunedin, New Zealand

Academic background
- Education: University of Otago

Academic work
- Discipline: Pathology
- Institutions: University of Otago

Eric Frederick D'Ath CBE (25 March 1897 – 18 June 1979) was a New Zealand pathologist, and was professor of pathology and medical jurisprudence at the University of Otago from 1929 until 1962.

In the 1965 Queen's Birthday Honours, D'Ath was appointed a Commander of the Order of the British Empire, in recognition of his services as professor of pathology and medical jurisprudence at the University of Otago. In 1975, he was conferred an honorary Doctor of Science degree by the University of Otago.
