= Judith Medlicott =

New Zealand lawyer (1942–2024)

Judith Medlicott CNZM

15th Chancellor of the University of Otago
- In office 1993–1998
- Preceded by: Jim Valentine
- Succeeded by: Eion Edgar

Personal details
- Born: Judith Olwyn Sloan; 6 March 1942 Invercargill, New Zealand
- Died: 4 May 2024 (aged 82) Dunedin, New Zealand
- Children: 3
- Education: University of Otago
- Profession: Lawyer

Judith Olwyn Medlicott CNZM (née Sloan; 6 March 1942 – 4 May 2024) was a New Zealand lawyer and advocate. She served as chancellor of the University of Otago from 1993 to 1998, and was the New Zealand Mastermind champion in 1988.

== Early life and education ==
Judith Olwyn Sloan was born in Invercargill, New Zealand on 6 March 1942. She was educated at Otago Girls' High School in Dunedin. She took up her law studies in 1972, after a Master of Arts degree, marriage and three children. In 1971, she was one of the eight original members of the Dunedin Collective for Woman. She was admitted to the bar in 1975. Both her degrees were completed at the University of Otago.

== Career ==
Medlicott's first position was at Dunedin law firm Cook Allan & Co. in 1975; she was made partner in 1980. In 1986, she left to form her own practice. At this time, she also founded OWLS, the Otago Women's Law Society. Her legal work often centred around issues of significance to women, such as Family Court and relationship property issues. She was also frequently appointed by the Family Court to represent children in custody and welfare cases.

In 1988, Medlicott won the New Zealand Mastermind TV competition.

Medlicott was chancellor of the University of Otago from 1993 to 1998. She served on a number of community boards, including Radio New Zealand, the Otago District Health Board, the New Zealand Law Practitioners Disciplinary Tribunal and the Ashburn Hall Charitable Trust.

== Later life and death ==
In 2003, Medlicott was one of 140 prominent New Zealanders who signed a petition seeking a Royal Commission into the controversial conviction of childcare worker Peter Ellis.

Medlicott died in Dunedin on 4 May 2024, at the age of 82.

== Honours and awards ==
In the 1998 Queen's Birthday Honours, Medlicott was appointed a Companion of the New Zealand Order of Merit, for services to the legal profession, education and the community. The same year she received an honorary doctorate of law from the University of Otago.

In 2014, Medlicott was awarded a life membership of OWLS, in recognition of her inspirational career and service to the legal community.

Academic offices
Preceded by Jim Valentine	Chancellor of the University of Otago; 1993–1998	Succeeded by Eion Edgar
