= Mick O'Callaghan (rugby union, born 1946) =

- Born: Michael William O'Callaghan; 27 April 1946 (age 80); Rotherham, New Zealand
- Education: Culverden District High School; Christchurch Boys' High School
- Alma mater: Lincoln College; Massey University; École nationale vétérinaire de Toulouse; University of Cambridge
- Scientific career
- Fields: Veterinary science
- Workplaces: Massey University; Tufts University
- Thesis: Assessment of sino-atrial and atrio-ventricular nodal function in the conscious horse by intra-atrial electrostimulation (1978)
- Height: 1.75 m (5 ft 9 in)
- Weight: 72 kg (159 lb)

Rugby union career
- Position: Wing
Senior career
Years	Team	Apps	(Points)
1970–71	Stade Poitevin		
1971–73	Stade Toulousain		
1974–77	Cambridge University		
Provincial / State sides
Years	Team	Apps	(Points)
1967–69, 1978–80	Manawatu		
1970	Waikato		
International career
Years	Team	Apps	(Points)
1968	New Zealand	3	(0)

Michael William O'Callaghan (born 27 April 1946) is a former New Zealand rugby union player. A wing three-quarter, O'Callaghan represented Manawatu and Waikato at a provincial level, and was a member of the New Zealand national side, the All Blacks, in 1968. He played three Test matches for the All Blacks against the touring French team that year. In 1980, he won the National Provincial Championship (NPC) with Manawatu and was also part of its successful Ranfurly Shield era from (1976-78).

After studying veterinary medicine at Massey University, O'Callaghan completed a master's degree at the National Veterinary School of Toulouse in France, where he played first for Stade Poitevin and then Stade Toulousain. He then undertook doctoral studies at the University of Cambridge; the title of his thesis, completed in 1978, was Assessment of sino-atrial and atrio-ventricular nodal function in the conscious horse by intra-atrial electrostimulation. While at Cambridge, he was awarded blues for rugby every year from 1974 to 1977. O'Callaghan then returned to Massey where he was on the faculty of the School of Veterinary Medicine, before moving to Tufts University School of Veterinary Medicine for 10 years, including three years as head of department. He then spent 15 years at Genzyme in Massachusetts as a research and development executive leader, before joining Audentes Therapeutics as senior vice president, preclinical development and translational medicine.

== Personal life ==
O'Callaghan married New Zealand scholar of French culture, Raylene Ramsay, in Poitiers in 1971.
