= Mayor of Otaki =

Mayor of a borough in New Zealand

The Mayor of Otaki officiated over the Otaki Borough of New Zealand, which was administered by the Otaki Borough Council. The office existed from 1921 until 1989, when Otaki Borough and was amalgamated into the new Kāpiti Coast District Council as part of the 1989 local government reforms. There were 10 holders of the office.

== List of mayors ==
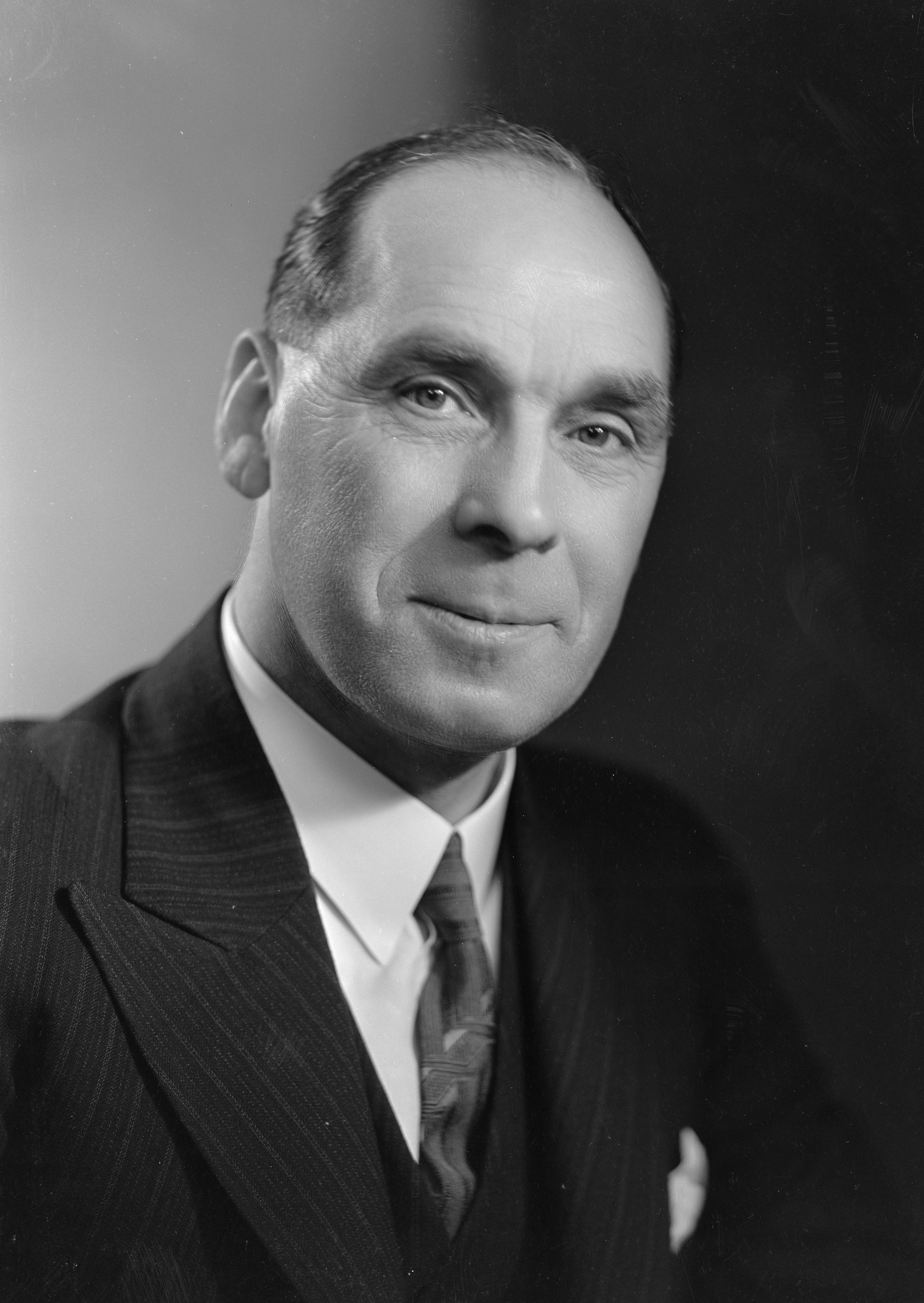
Robert McKeen (1953–1959)

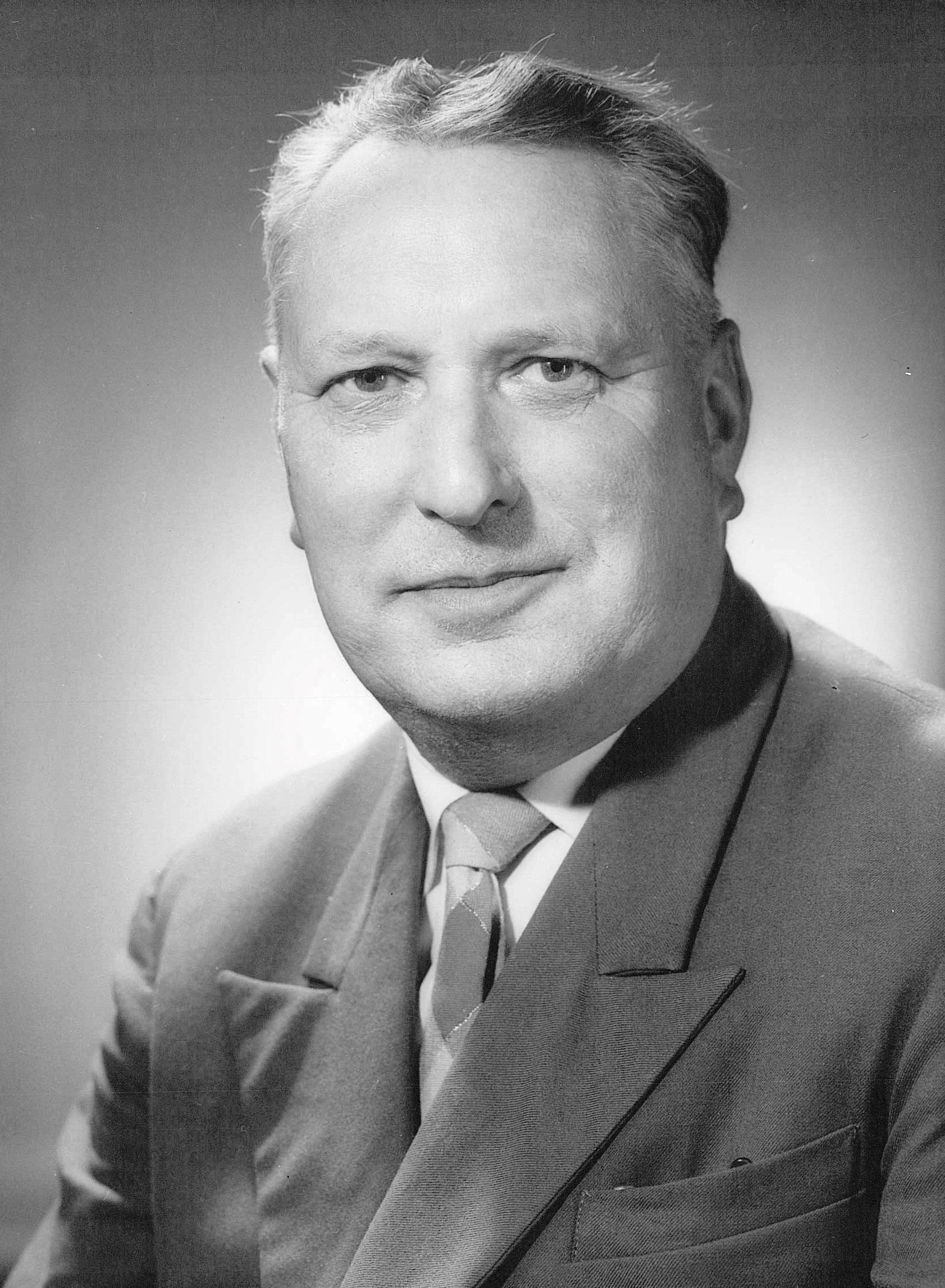
John Gibbs Churchill (1969–1975)

Mayors of Otaki were:

| | Name | Term |
|---|---|---|
| 1 | James Poole Brandon | 1921–1929 |
| 2 | Charlie Atmore | 1929–1933 |
| 3 | Timothy O'Rourke | 1933–1939 |
| (2) | Charlie Atmore | 1939–1953 |
| 4 | Robert McKeen | 1953–1959 |
| 5 | Frederick Robert Knight | 1959–1963 |
| 6 | Otho Henry Edward Yates | 1963–1969 |
| 7 | John Gibbs Churchill | 1969–1975 |
| 8 | Murray Scott | 1976–1983 |
| 9 | Kerin Patterson | 1983–1986 |
| 10 | Wally Ludlam | 1986–1989 |
