= Bridget Williams =

New Zealand publisher

Bridget Williams ONZM MBE
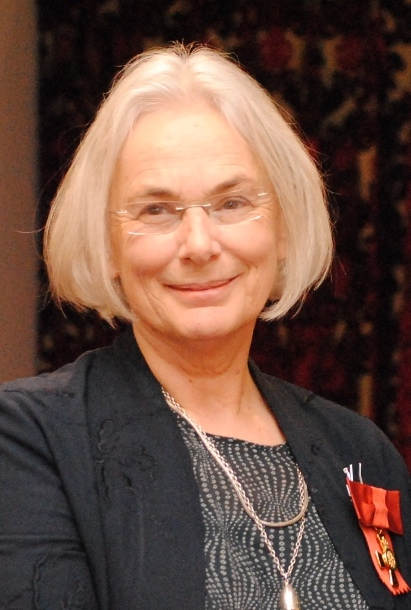
- Williams in 2012
- Born: 1948 (age 77–78)
- Education: University of Otago
- Known for: founder of independent publishing companies Port Nicholson Press and Bridget Williams Books
- Relatives: Robin Williams (father)

Bridget Rosamund Williams ONZM MBE (born 1948) is a New Zealand publisher and founder of two independent publishing companies: Port Nicholson Press and Bridget Williams Books.

== Early life and family ==
Born in 1948, Williams was the daughter of Mary Williams (née Thorpe) and her husband mathematician and public servant Robin Williams. Williams attended Wellington Girls' College, and, in 1966, moved to Dunedin to study an arts degree in English literature at the University of Otago, where her father was appointed vice-chancellor the following year.

== Career ==
Williams' publishing career began when she and her husband were living in Oxford, England, while her husband, economist Geoff Bertram, studied for a PhD. Williams found work as a research assistant for Professor Helen Gardner, working on editing The New Oxford Book of English Verse, and for Professor Richard Ellmann, a biographer. These connections led on to work as an editor at Oxford University Press (OUP).

When Williams returned to New Zealand in 1976, she continued to work for OUP, collaborating with W. H. Oliver on the Oxford History of New Zealand, the first general history of New Zealand to have been published in over 20 years. In 1981 Williams left OUP to start her own independent company, Port Nicholson Press, which she founded with Roy Parsons and Lindsey Missen.

Four years later Williams sold the company to Allen & Unwin (Australia) and became managing director of Allen & Unwin (New Zealand). Two of her major projects while at Allen & Unwin went on to win the Goodman Fielder Wattie Book Award: the multi-volume Dictionary of New Zealand Biography; and Claudia Orange's The Treaty of Waitangi.

In 1990 she founded Bridget Williams Books, focusing on non-fiction books on New Zealand history, women's history, Māori history and contemporary topics. The company is recognised for making a significant contribution to the body of New Zealand historical work. Notable publications include The Book of New Zealand Women and the first general history of Māori, Tangata Whenua: An Illustrated History. In 1997, The Story of Suzanne Aubert won Book of the Year at the Montana New Zealand Book Awards. In 2010, Encircled Lands: Te Urewera 1820–1921 won the NZ Post Book of the Year Award.

From 1995 to 1998, Williams published under a joint imprint with Auckland University Press.

Williams has also been active in publishing events and organisations. She was a founding member of the Listener Women's Book Festival, and involved in both the Independent Publishers network and the Publishers' Association of New Zealand.

== Recognition ==
In 1982, Williams was awarded a Winston Churchill Fellowship. In the 1996 New Year Honours, she was appointed a Member of the Order of the British Empire, for services to book publishing, and in the 2012 Queen's Birthday and Diamond Jubilee Honours she was made an Officer of the New Zealand Order of Merit, for services to publishing.
