= Eion Edgar =

New Zealand businessman and philanthropist (1945–2021)

Sir Eion Edgar KNZM
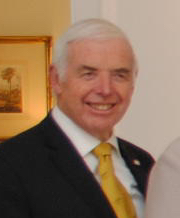
- Edgar in 2012

16th Chancellor of the University of Otago
- In office 1999–2003
- Preceded by: Judith Medlicott
- Succeeded by: Lindsay Brown

Personal details
- Born: Eion Sinclair Edgar; 30 January 1945 Dunedin, New Zealand
- Died: 14 June 2021 (aged 76) Queenstown, New Zealand
- Children: 3 sons
- Education: University of Otago
- Profession: Accountant

Sir Eion Sinclair Edgar KNZM (30 January 1945 – 14 June 2021) was a New Zealand businessman and philanthropist. He was the chairman of Forsyth Barr Group, a major investment company based in Dunedin, for 20 years until his retirement in 2018, and was chancellor of the University of Otago between 1999 and 2003.

== Biography ==
Edgar was born and raised in Dunedin to parents George, an accountant and sharebroker, and Caroline Edgar. He was educated at Anderson's Bay Primary School and John McGlashan College before attending the University of Otago. He graduated with a Bachelor of Commerce degree in 1967 and completed his accounting professional qualifications the following year. He began working for Forsyth Barr in 1972. Edgar and his wife Jan moved to Queenstown in 1994. They had three sons.

Edgar served as chancellor of the University of Otago from 1999 until 2003, and was awarded an honorary doctorate in Law from the university. He was also a director of the Reserve Bank of New Zealand, chairman of the New Zealand Stock Exchange, and president of the New Zealand Olympic Committee (he was given the title of honorary president for life upon his retirement from the post in 2009). He was also a trustee of the Arts Foundation of New Zealand and of the Halberg Disability Foundation.

Edgar was chairman of numerous charitable trusts and organisations, including the Edgar Olympic Foundation, New Zealand Dementia Prevention Trust, and Winter Games NZ Charitable Trust. He was the official patron of Diabetes New Zealand, the New Zealand Sports Hall of Fame and the New Zealand Football Foundation. He helped in the creation of the University of Otago's Edgar Diabetes and Obesity Research Centre, and also in the creation of the southern hemisphere's largest single-building indoor sports arena, Dunedin's Edgar Centre. He served as a chairman of Forsyth Barr for 20 years, stepping down in 2018. In that role, he was instrumental in the company's sponsorship of Forsyth Barr Stadium, Dunedin's main international sports complex.

Edgar died in Queenstown on 14 June 2021, aged 76, having been diagnosed with pancreatic cancer in late 2020.

== Honours and awards ==
Edgar's business and philanthropic work has earned him numerous awards, including being named as 2004 NBR New Zealander of the Year, and induction into the New Zealand Business Hall of Fame in 2004. In the 1996 Queen's Birthday Honours, he was appointed a Companion of the New Zealand Order of Merit, for services to business management and the community, and he was promoted to Distinguished Companion of the New Zealand Order of Merit, for services to education, business and sport, in the 2003 Queen's Birthday Honours. Following the restoration of titular honours by the New Zealand government in early 2009, Edgar accepted redesignation as a Knight Companion of the New Zealand Order of Merit in the 2009 Special Honours, thereby adopting the appelation sir.

Academic offices
Preceded by Judith Medlicott	Chancellor of the University of Otago; 1999–2003	Succeeded by Lindsay Brown
