= Éva Circé-Côté =

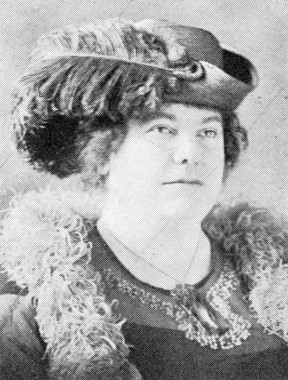
- Born: Éva Circé; January 31, 1871
- Died: 1949
- Other names: Colombine, Musette, Jean Nay, Fantasio, Arthur Maheu, Julien Saint-Michel, Paul S. Bédard
- Occupation: Journalist

Éva Circé-Côté (1871–1949), born Éva Circé in Montreal, was a journalist, a poet, and a librarian who established Montreal's first public library in 1903. She wrote under several pseudonyms during her lifetime, including Colombine, Musette, Jean Nay, Fantasio, Arthur Maheu, Julien Saint-Michel, and Paul S. Bédard.

== Works ==
=== Plays ===
- 1903 : Hindelang et DeLorimier (historical drama in five Acts)
- 1904 : Le Fumeur endiablé (One-act play)
- 1921 : Maisonneuve (historical drama in four Acts)
- 1922 : L'Anglomanie (3-act play, awarded the prix de l'Action française)

=== Poetry ===
- 1903: Bleu, Blanc, Rouge. Poésie, paysages, causeries. (Collection of poems and essays, under the pseudonym Colombine), Déom Frères éditeurs, Montréal, 1903

=== Essays ===
- 1924: Papineau, son influence sur la pensée canadienne; essai de psychologie historique, Ève Circé-Côté (editor), R.A. Regnault & cie imprimeurs, Montréal, 1924. Republished: Lux, Montréal, 2002, 266 pages ISBN 978-2-922494-54-9.

=== Articles available on-line ===
- 1916 : L'éducation de nos filles : elles doivent être protégées pour les luttes de la vie
- 1916 : Incapacité intellectuelle et civile de la femme
- 1917 : Travail égal - salaire égal
- 1918 : Le rôle de la femme en politique
- 1921 : Décence et hypocrisie
- 1923 : Restons chez-nous: L'exode des Canadiens aux États-Unis
