= Otago Girls' High School =

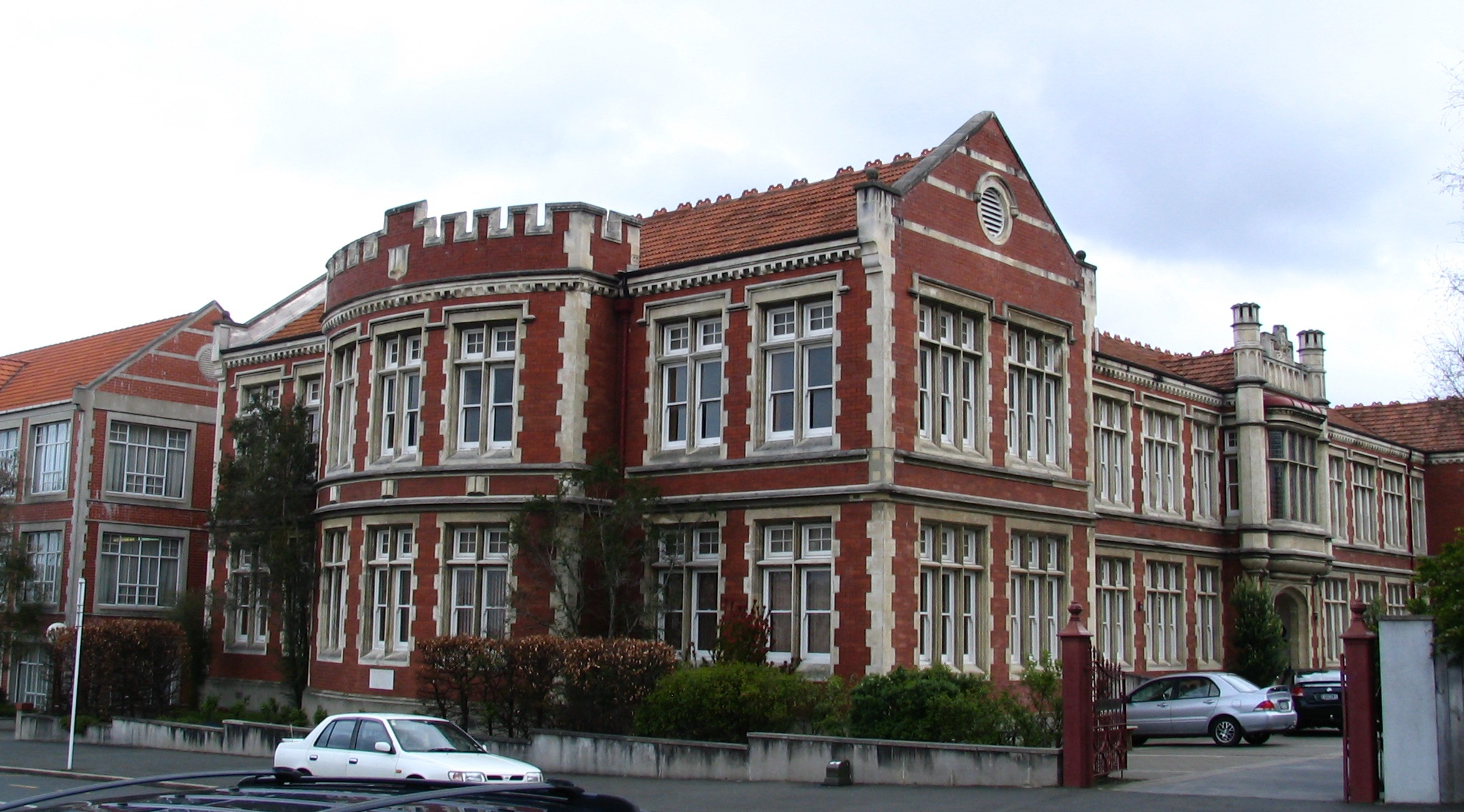

Location
- 41 Tennyson Street; Dunedin; Otago 9016; New Zealand; 45.874981°S 170.499946°E

Information
- Type: State
- Motto: Latin: Recti Cultus Pectora Roborant ("The 'right' learning builds a heart of oak")
- Established: 6 February 1871; 150 years ago
- Ministry of Education Institution no.: 378
- Principal: Bridget Davidson
- Years: 9–13
- Gender: Girls-only
- Enrolment: 717 (July 2026)
- Houses: Allan; Benjamin; Cruikshank; Williams
- Song: The Chambered Nautilus
- Socio-economic decile: 8P
- Newspaper: Nautilus
- Website: www.otagogirls.school.nz

Otago Girls' High School (OGHS) is a secondary school in Dunedin, Otago, New Zealand. It was opened 6 February 1871, after a long campaign by Learmonth Whyte Dalrymple. It is one of the oldest girls' state-run secondary schools in the Southern Hemisphere and has been described as the sixth oldest school of this type in the world.

The school has its own radio show on Otago Access Radio.

== History ==
=== Buildings ===
At its foundation the school occupied a neo-classical building on its present site which it shared with Otago Boys' High School. A new building on another site was built for the boys which they moved to in 1885. In 1910 the present main block was opened, designed by Edmund Anscombe (1874–1948) and the old building on Tennyson Street was demolished. Temporary structures were replaced in the 1970s by Ministry of Education blocks, contextualised by the use of brick to the Anscombe building. In the 1980s the main block was scheduled for demolition. After protest it was restored and extended with an addition designed by Ted McCoy, and in 1987 was listed as a Category I Historic Place. The school has since acquired part of the old King Edward Technical School site. It has erected structures there accessible by way of a pedestrian underpass beneath Smith Street.

=== Racist attack ===
The school gained international attention in February 2022 after a Muslim student was beaten by her peers for wearing a hijab, which resulted in the student being hospitalised with a concussion. The incident led to an international and domestic outcry, with support for the student coming from Bella Hadid, Sonny Bill Williams, among others. Two of the students responsible for the attack were subsequently expelled while a third was referred to counselling. Principal Bridget Davidson confirmed that the school was working with the victims, Muslim community and Police to address the bullying and assault. Otago Muslim Association chairman Mohammad Rizwan welcomed the outcome.

== Enrolment ==
As of July 2026, Otago Girls' High School has 717 students, of which 108 (15.1%) identify as Māori.

As of 2026, Otago Girls' High School has an Equity Index of 439, placing it amongst schools whose students have below average socioeconomic barriers to achievement (roughly equivalent to decile 7 under the former socio-economic decile system).

== Notable alumnae ==
- Mina Arndt – artist
- Ethel Benjamin – New Zealand's first female lawyer
- Kelly Brazier – rugby union player
- Kushana Bush – artist
- Silvia Cartwright – former Governor General of New Zealand
- Ann Chapman – first woman to lead an Antarctic expedition
- Mai Chen – constitutional lawyer
- Constance Clyde – writer
- Margaret Cruickshank – New Zealand's first female medical doctor
- Elizabeth Gunn – paediatrician
- Alison Holst – cook
- Grace Joel – painter
- Millie Lovelock – student journalist, singer-songwriter-guitarist
- Juliet Marillier – author
- Shona McFarlane – artist, journalist and broadcaster
- Mandy Mayhem, performer, artist and local politician
- Judith Medlicott – family lawyer and former University of Otago Chancellor
- Emily Hancock Siedeberg – New Zealand's first female medical graduate
- Patricia Payne (mezzo-soprano) – opera singer
- Raylene Ramsay – French culture researcher
- Olga Stringfellow – writer
- Nancy Tichborne – watercolour artist
- Yvette Williams – first New Zealand woman to win an Olympic gold medal

== Notable faculty ==
- Katherine Browning
- Jessie Buckland
- Janet Hesketh
- Bridie Lonie
- Clare Mallory
- Maria Marchant
