= 1965 Birthday Honours (New Zealand) =

Awards list for New Zealand

The 1965 Queen's Birthday Honours in New Zealand, celebrating the official birthday of Elizabeth II, were appointments made by the Queen on the advice of the New Zealand government to various orders and honours to reward and highlight good works by New Zealanders. They were announced on 12 June 1965.

The recipients of honours are displayed here as they were styled before their new honour.

== Order of Saint Michael and Saint George ==
=== Knight Grand Cross (GCMG) ===
- The Right Honourable Walter Nash CH. For political and public services.
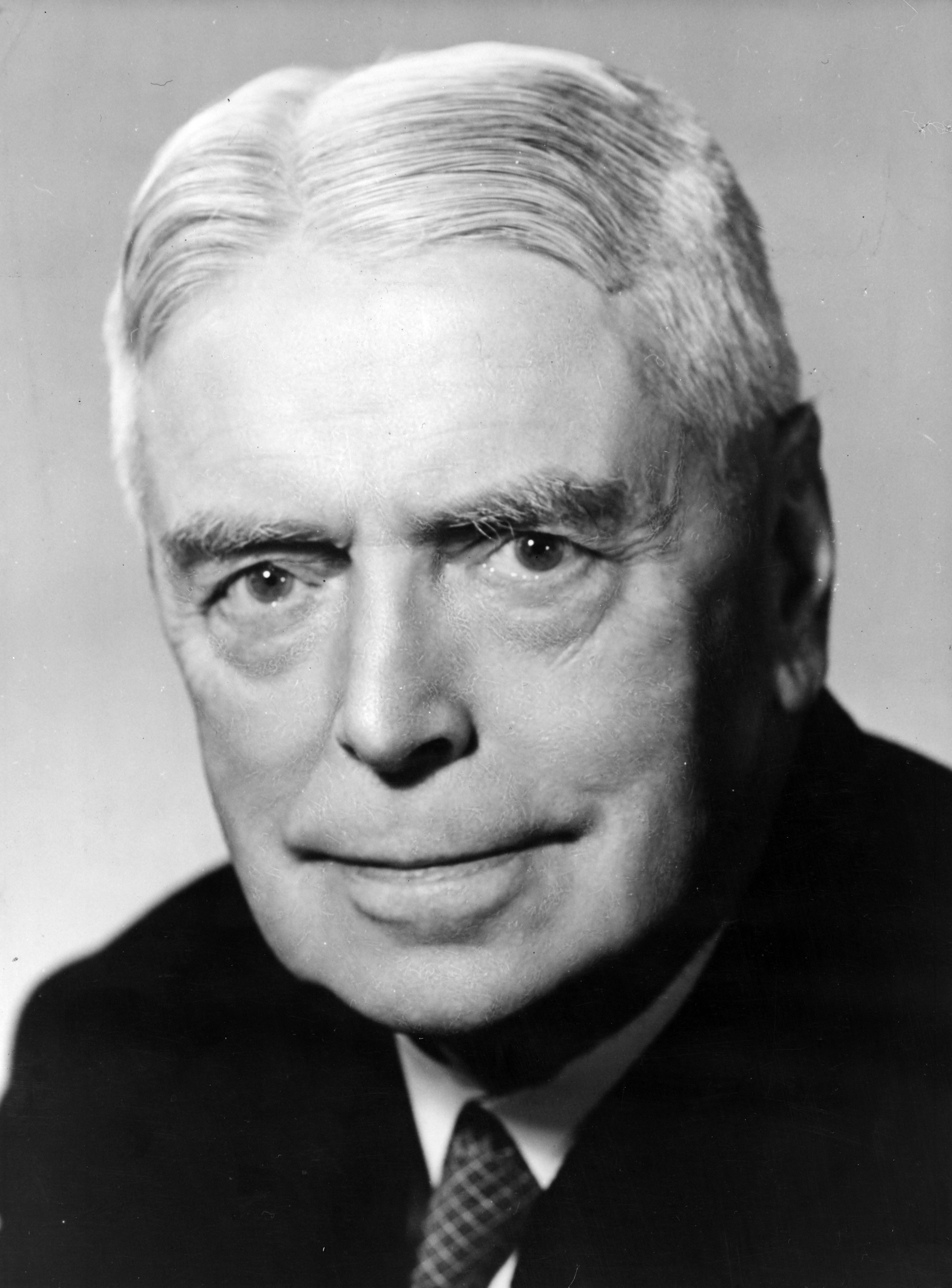
Sir Walter Nash

=== Knight Commander (KCMG) ===
- The Honourable William Stanley Goosman. For political and public services.
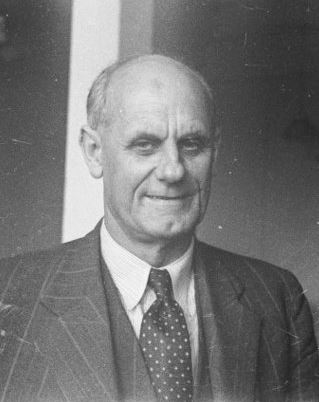
Sir Stanley Goosman

=== Companion (CMG) ===
- Cuthbert Stuart Hogg. For services to sport and administration, especially as chairman of the New Zealand Rugby Union and chairman of the New Zealand Tariff and Development Board.
- The Right Reverend William John Simkin – formerly Bishop of Auckland. For services to the community.

== Order of the British Empire ==
=== Commander (CBE) ===
Civil division

- Archibald Douglas Burns – Auditor-General.
- Eric Frederick D'Ath MB ChB – lately professor of pathology and medical jurisprudence, Otago Medical School, Dunedin.
- Percival Bernard Marshall – lately general manager, New Zealand Dairy Products Marketing Commission.
- Reginald Charles Frank Savory – of Auckland. For services to local government and technical education.

Military division

- Air Commodore Theodore Jasper Maclean de Lange DFC – Royal New Zealand Air Force.
- Wing Commander Robert Maxwell McKay AFC – Royal New Zealand Air Force.
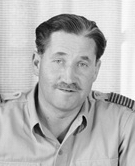
Theo de Lange

=== Officer (OBE) ===
Civil division

- John Atirau Asher – of Taupō. For services to the Māori people.
- Clifford Lyle Bishop – mayor of Eastbourne.
- Percy Charles Edward Brunette FRCSE MRCP. For services to the community, especially, to Nelson Hospital.
- John Gibbs Churchill JP – lately general secretary of the Post Office Association.
- John Alfred Cushen – of Invercargill. For services to the community.
- Donald George Grant – of Dannevirke. For services to the beef cattle industry.
- Ena Nellie Hollis JP – matron-in-chief, Waikato Hospital, Hamilton.
- Lloyd Mandeno – of Auckland. For services to engineering.
- Gilbert Murray Rennie JP – mayor of Palmerston North.
- George Milne Spence – of Blenheim. For services to the community and civil aviation.

Military division

- Lieutenant-Colonel Robert Josiah Walton ED – Royal New Zealand Army Service Corps (Territorial Force).
- Lieutenant-Colonel Edward William Whiteacre – Royal New Zealand Army Ordnance Corps (Regular Force).
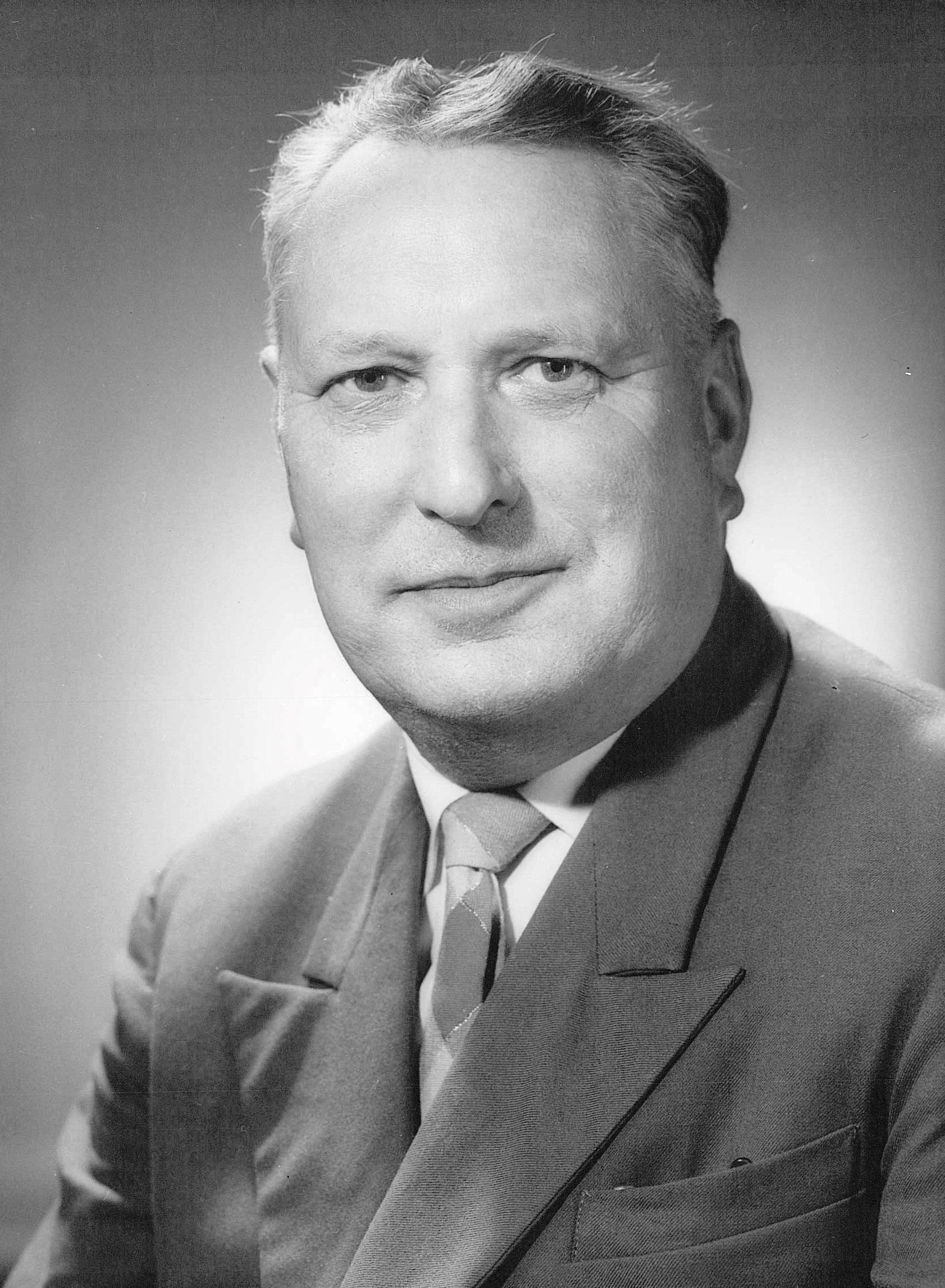
Jack Churchill

=== Member (MBE) ===
Civil division

- Donald William Bain – general secretary in New Zealand of the Royal Overseas League.
- Ernest Black – of Balfour. For services to farming.
- William Brown – of Dunedin. For services to the community.
- Robert Edinborough Chamberlain – of Masterton. For services to farming.
- Rosetta Frances Elliott – matron of Oakley Hospital, Auckland.
- William David Harris – of Pahiatua. For services to the dairy industry.
- John Elden Hatchwell – honorary chief instructor of the Taranaki Surf Association.
- Edith Mary Kenwood. For services to the community, especially as president of the Kaikohe Red Cross Society.
- William Roland Pierce Jaques ED – honorary secretary of the Nelson branch of the Heritage Movement.
- John Frank Johnson – mayor of Whangarei.
- Elizabeth May Martin. For services to the community, especially in connection with the Dominion Federation of New Zealand Country Women's Institutes.
- Margaret Wilson Meikle. For services to the community in Oamaru.
- Leslie Richmond Rex – of Niue. For services as a teacher and official interpreter.
- Nelle Margaret Scanlan – of Paraparaumu Beach. For services to journalism and New Zealand writing.
- Isabel Veronica Shrimpton – secretary of the Canterbury Chamber of Commerce and the Christchurch Junior Chamber.
- Vivian Smith JP – of Taihape. For services to local government.
- Gwendolen Lucy Somerset – of Wellington. For services to pre-school and adult education.
- Mark Wallace JP – of Hokitika. For services to local government and farming.

Military division

- Lieutenant Commander Albert Henry Edginton VRD – Royal New Zealand Naval Volunteer Reserve (Retired).
- Major William Henry Dyson – Royal New Zealand Signal Corps (Regular Force).
- Warrant Officer Class I Noel Peter O'Dwyer – Royal New Zealand Armoured Corps (Regular Force).
- Captain Robert Henry O'Leary – Royal New Zealand Army Medical Corps.
- Major (now Lieutenant-Colonel (temporary)) Ross David Yetton – Royal New Zealand Infantry Regiment (Regular Force).
- Squadron Leader Kelvin Reid Bremner MB ChB – Royal New Zealand Air Force.
- Warrant Officer William Perry Sinclair – Royal New Zealand Air Force.
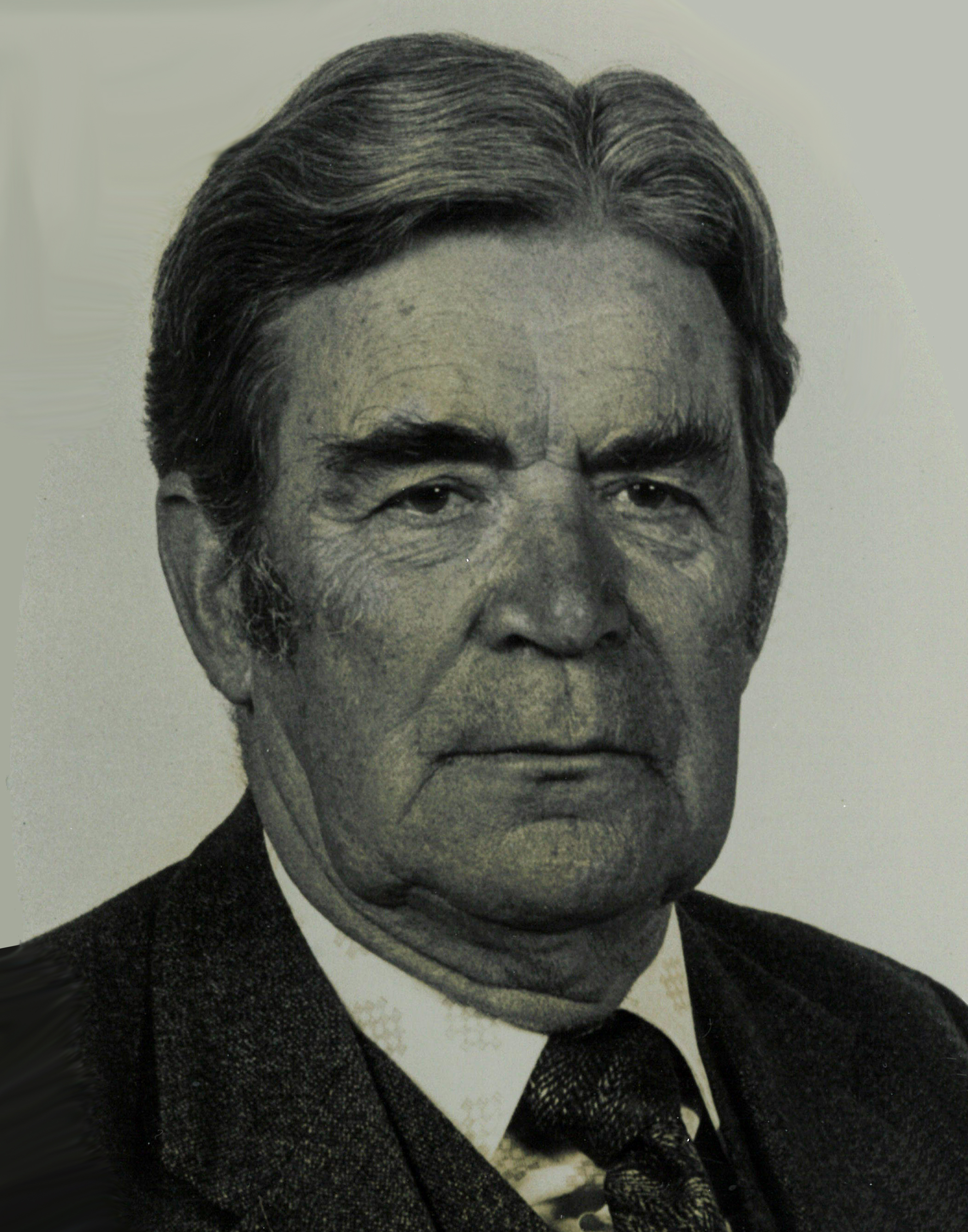
Donald Bain

== Companion of the Imperial Service Order (ISO) ==
- Ronald George Trounce Lewis MB ChB JP – deputy Director-General of Health.
- Robert Taylor Wright JP – lately director of the Commodity Division, Department of Industries and Commerce, Wellington.

== British Empire Medal (BEM) ==
Civil division, for gallantry

- Robina Olive Lovell – matron, Tauranga Hospital Board's old people's home, Te Puke. For services when a fire broke out in an old people's home.
- Terence Ross Mortensen – constable, New Zealand Police, Wellington. For rescuing three boys overcome by poisonous gas in a tunnel.
- David Bryan John Painter – constable, New Zealand Police, Wellington. For rescuing three boys overcome by poisonous gas in a tunnel.

Military division

- Chief Petty Officer Edward James Button – Royal New Zealand Navy.
- Chief Petty Officer Thomas Edwin Easterbrook – Royal New Zealand Navy.
- Engine Room Artificer First Class Sydney Arthur Phipps – Royal New Zealand Navy.
- Master-at-Arms (Recruiter) Paul Manchester Tasker – Royal New Zealand Navy.
- Staff-Sergeant Selwyn Lawrence Keane – Royal New Zealand Infantry Regiment (Territorial Force).
- Flight Sergeant Ralph Irving Simpson – Royal New Zealand Air Force.
- Corporal Albert Ernest Hardy – Royal New Zealand Air Force.

== Royal Red Cross ==
=== Member (RRC) ===
- Principal Matron Mary Webster Wilson – Royal New Zealand Nursing Corps (Regular Force).

== Air Force Cross (AFC) ==
- Squadron Leader Daniel John Cotton – Royal New Zealand Air Force.
- Squadron Leader Brian Stanley-Hunt – Royal New Zealand Air Force.

== Queen's Police Medal (QPM) ==
- Alphonsus Gerard Quin – assistant commissioner, New Zealand Police Force.
- Claude Alexander Guy McRae – superintendent, New Zealand Police Force.
