= Alison Holst =

New Zealand chef

Dame Alison Holst DNZM CBE QSM
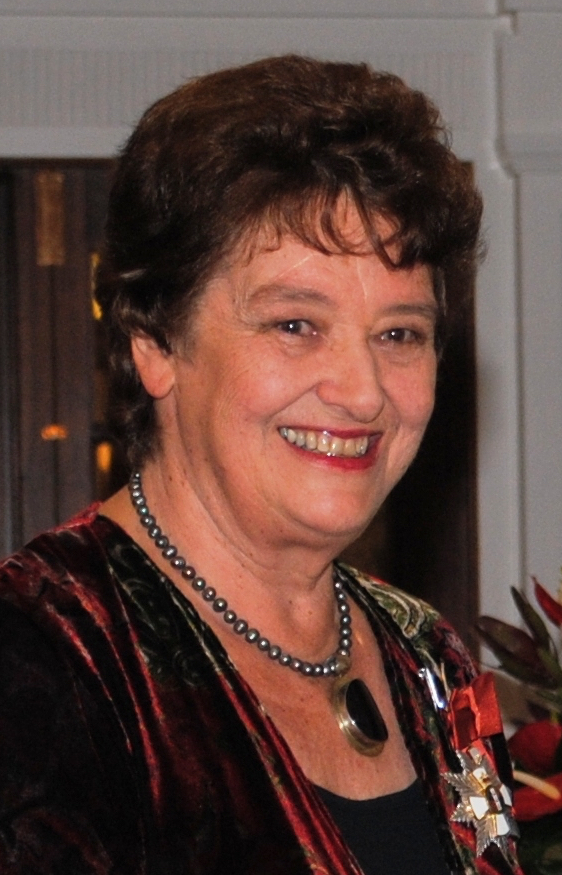
- Holst in 2011
- Born: Alison Margaret Payne; 1938 (age 87–88); Opoho, Dunedin, New Zealand
- Known for: Food writing Television chef
- Relatives: Patricia Payne (sister)

Dame Alison Margaret Holst DNZM CBE QSM (née Payne, born 1938) is a New Zealand food writer and television celebrity chef.

== Biography ==
Alison was born in Dunedin, and graduated from the University of Otago, then a constituent college of the University of New Zealand, with a Bachelor of Home Science and subsequently spent a year at Teachers' College. She then began lecturing in the Foods Department at the School of Home Science before starting her television career. Her first television programme premiered in 1965, making New Zealand's first female television cook. The following year she published her first cookbook. Since then (as of 2010) her cookbooks have collectively sold more than four and a half million copies of 100 titles, and she has appeared on numerous other television and radio shows as well as writing newspaper columns and magazine articles.

Since 1990 she has co-written several cookbooks with her son, Simon Holst. In November 2010 Holst appeared on Radio New Zealand's afternoon programme to deny rumours that she had been asked to be the next governor-general.

Holst has described the style of food in most of her books as 'everyday food' and the recipes are generally written for home cooks and intended to be easy and reasonably cheap to make, as well as nutritious. Since 1994 she has marketed a brand of bulk wholefoods under the name Alison's Pantry through the Foodstuffs supermarket company.

Her cook book Meals with the Family from 1967 is held in the collections at New Zealand’s national museum Te Papa Tongarewa.

In 2015, it was revealed that Alison Holst had been diagnosed with dementia.

== Honours ==
In the 1983 Queen's Birthday Honours, Holst was awarded the Queen's Service Medal for public services. In the 1987 New Year Honours, she was appointed a Commander of the Order of the British Empire, for services to home science. In 1997, the University of Otago conferred Holst with an honorary Doctor of Science degree.

In the 2011 New Year Honours, Holst was appointed a Dame Companion of the New Zealand Order of Merit, for services to the food industry.

== Personal Life ==
Alison Holst was born in Ōpoho, Dunedin in 1938. Her father was a lecturer at Dunedin Teacher's College, her mother was a nurse. She is the eldest of three sisters, her sister Patricia Payne is an opera singer, and Clare Ferguson a food stylist. She has two children, who would often join her on set. Holst retired in 2015, after having published over 100 books.

== See also ==
- List of New Zealand television personalities
