= Lindsay Brown (accountant) =

New Zealand accountant (died 2020)

Lindsay Brown MNZM
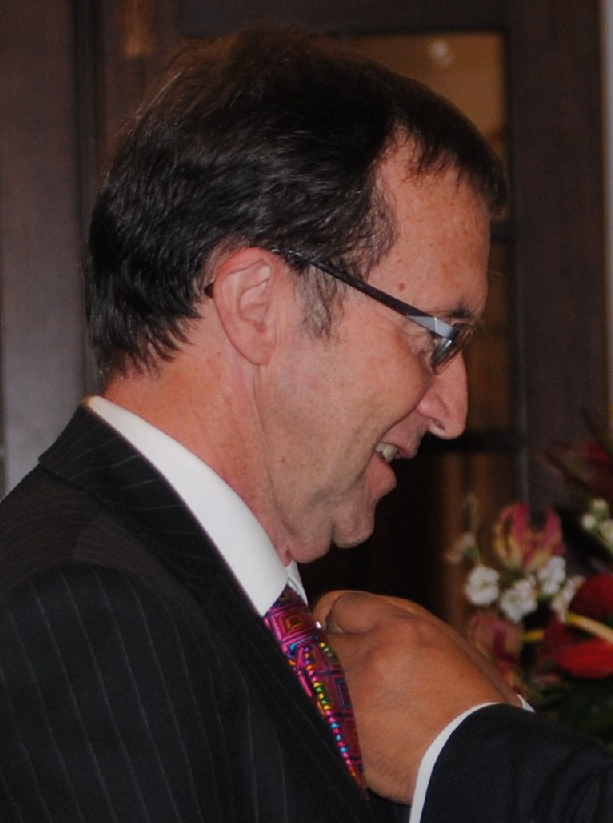
- Brown in 2011

17th Chancellor of the University of Otago
- In office 1 January 2004 – 31 December 2008
- Preceded by: Eion Edgar
- Succeeded by: John Ward

Personal details
- Born: Lindsay John Brown; 11 September 1943 St Kilda, Dunedin, New Zealand
- Died: 6 August 2020 (aged 76) Dunedin, New Zealand
- Profession: Accountant

Lindsay John Brown MNZM (11 September 1943 – 6 August 2020) was a New Zealand accountant. He served as chancellor of the University of Otago from 2004 to 2008.

== Biography ==
Born in the Dunedin suburb of St Kilda on 11 September 1943, Brown was the son of Vivien Mary and John Henry Brown. He graduated with a Bachelor of Commerce degree in accountancy from the University of Otago. He went on to become a partner in the international accounting firm Deloitte, and was managing partner of the Dunedin office for 10 years.

Brown was a member of the Council of the University of Otago for 16 years, and was chancellor for five years, from 2004 to 2008, having previously served as pro-chancellor. He subsequently chaired the advisory board of the School of Business at the University of Otago. He was also a member of the national board of the Cancer Society of New Zealand, and served as chair of the Otago Southland division of the organisation.

On 10 December 2008, Brown was conferred with an honorary LLD degree by the University of Otago. In the 2011 New Year Honours, he was appointed a Member of the New Zealand Order of Merit, for services to the community.

Brown died in Dunedin on 6 August 2020, aged 76.

Academic offices
| Preceded by Eion Edgar | Chancellor of the University of Otago; 2004–2008 | Succeeded by John Ward |
