= 2024 Birthday Honours (New Zealand) =

Awards list for New Zealand

2024 King's Birthday Honours
- Previous: 2024 New Year Honours; Next: 2024 New Zealand bravery awards
- Type: New Zealand royal honours: New Zealand Order of Merit; King's Service Order; King's Service Medal; Distinguished Service Decoration
- Date: 3 June 2024
- Country: New Zealand

Highlights
- Total recipients: 174

The 2024 King's Birthday Honours in New Zealand, celebrating the official birthday of King Charles III, were appointments made by the King in his right as King of New Zealand, on the advice of the New Zealand government, to various orders and honours to reward and highlight good works by New Zealanders. This was the first honours list to include appointments to the renamed King's Service Order (formerly the Queen's Service Order) and award of the associated King's Service Medal (previously the Queen's Service Medal), following the death of Elizabeth II and the accession of Charles III in 2022. The honours were announced on 3 June 2024.

The recipients of honours are listed here as they were styled before their new honour.

== New Zealand Order of Merit ==
=== Dame Companion (DNZM) ===
- Theresa Elizabeth Gattung CNZM – of Auckland. For services to women, governance and philanthropy.
- Joan Withers – of Papakura. For services to business, governance and women.
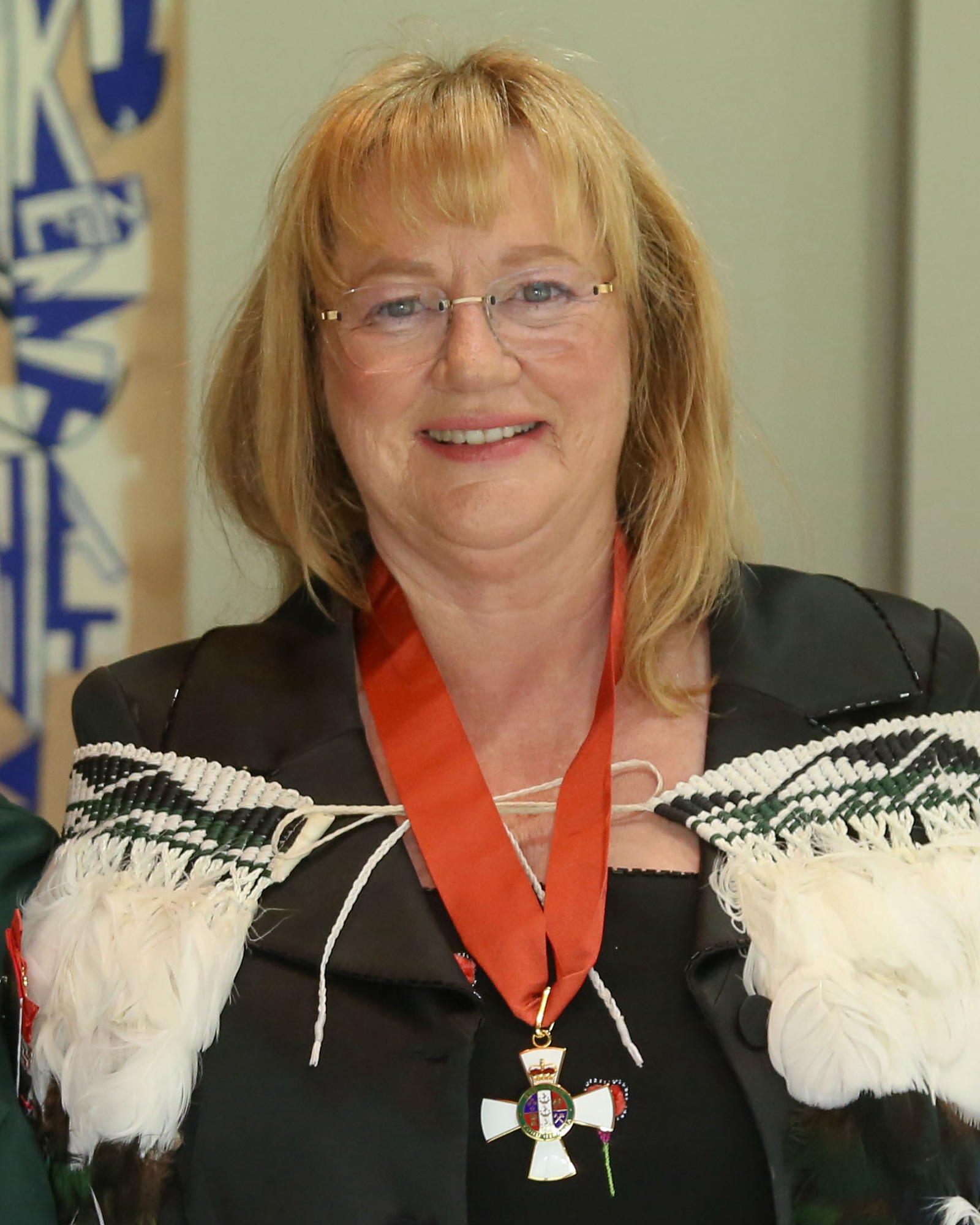
Dame Theresa Gattung

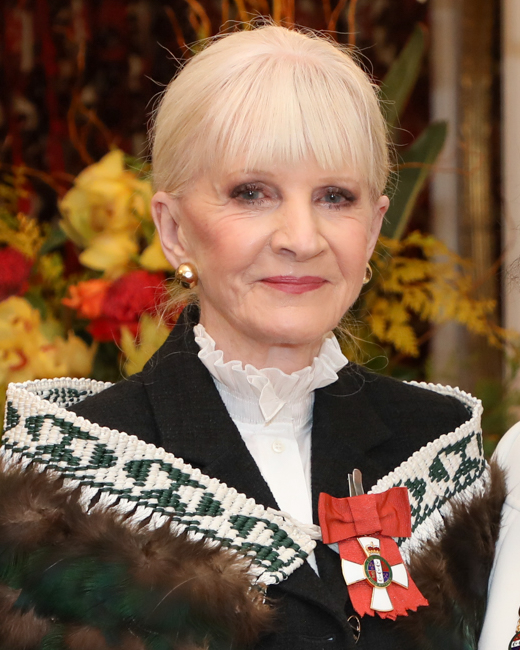
Dame Joan Withers

=== Knight Companion (KNZM) ===
- Peter Joseph Beck – of Auckland. For services to the aerospace industry, business and education.
- Professor Peter John Hunter MNZM – of Auckland. For services to medical science.
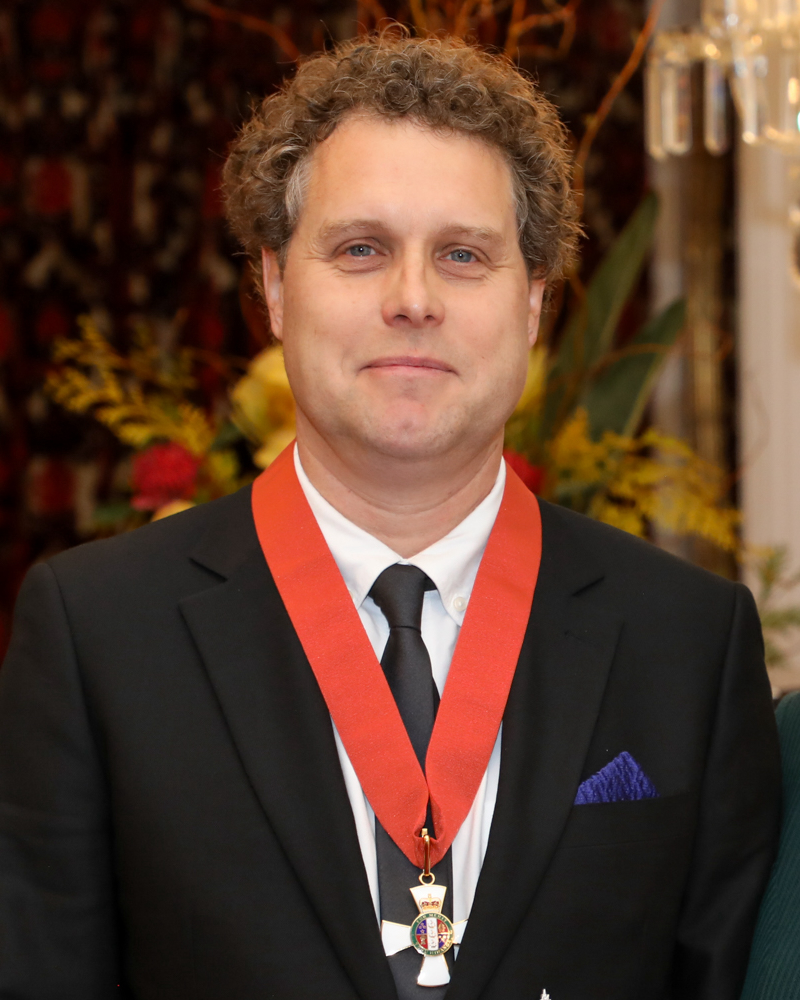
Sir Peter Beck

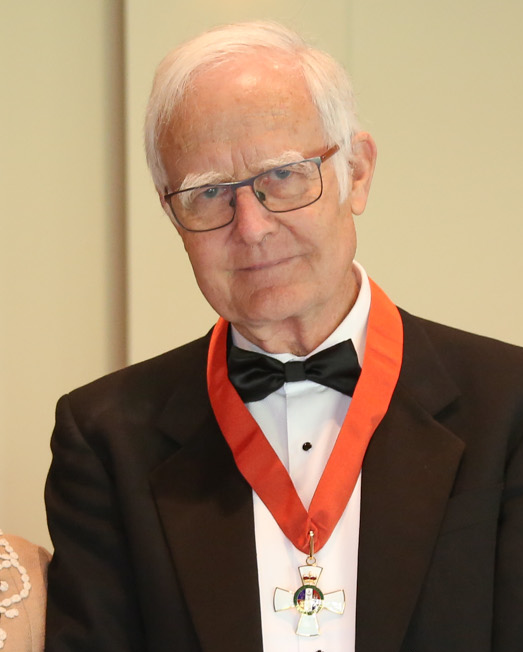
Sir Peter Hunter

=== Companion (CNZM) ===
- Vincent Alexandra Ashworth – of Morrinsville. For services to agriculture.
- Arihia Darryl Bennett MNZM – of Kaiapoi. For services to Māori, governance and the community.
- James Boult ONZM – of Queenstown. For services to local government, tourism and the community.
- Anne Candy QSO JP – of Auckland. For services to Māori and local government.
- Rodney Adrian Duke – of Auckland. For services to philanthropy and business.
- William Beau Holland MNZM – of Tauranga. For services to community governance and philanthropy.
- Mary Helen Lee – of Wānaka. For services to snow sports and tourism.
- Lesley Joan Milne – of Auckland. For services to rowing.
- Dr John Charles Peek – of Auckland. For services to fertility treatment and reproductive health,
- Catherine Ann Grant Sadleir – of London. For services to sports governance and women.
- Christopher John Seed – of Wellington. For services to the State.
- Air Marshal Kevin Ronald Short – of Wellington. For services to the New Zealand Defence Force.
- Megan Faye Tamati-Quennell – of Wellington. For services to Māori and First Nations art.
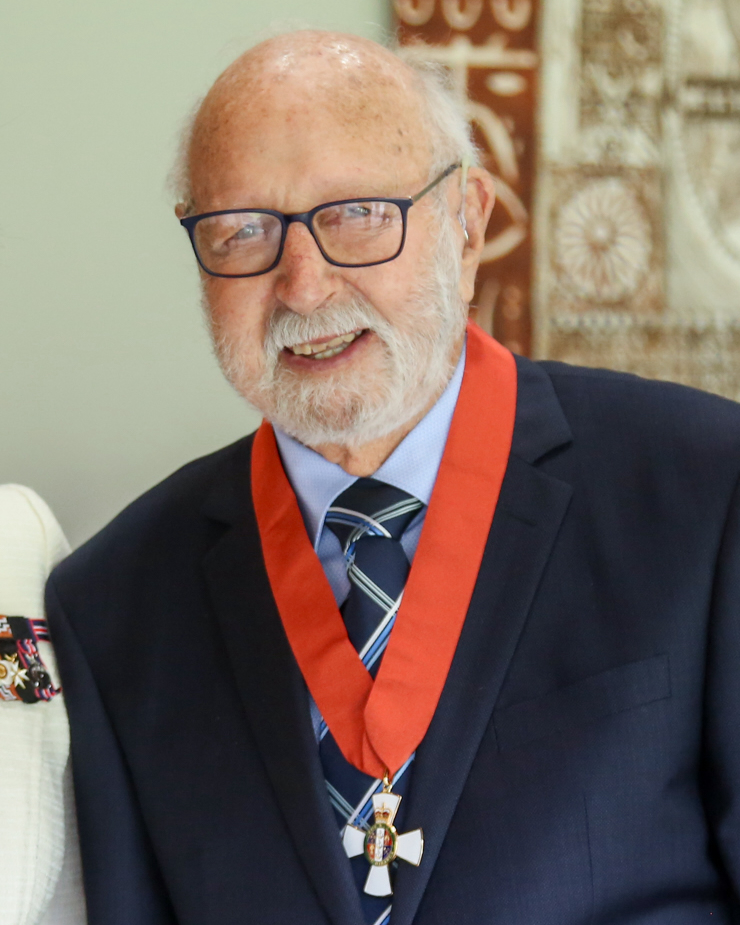
Vince Ashworth

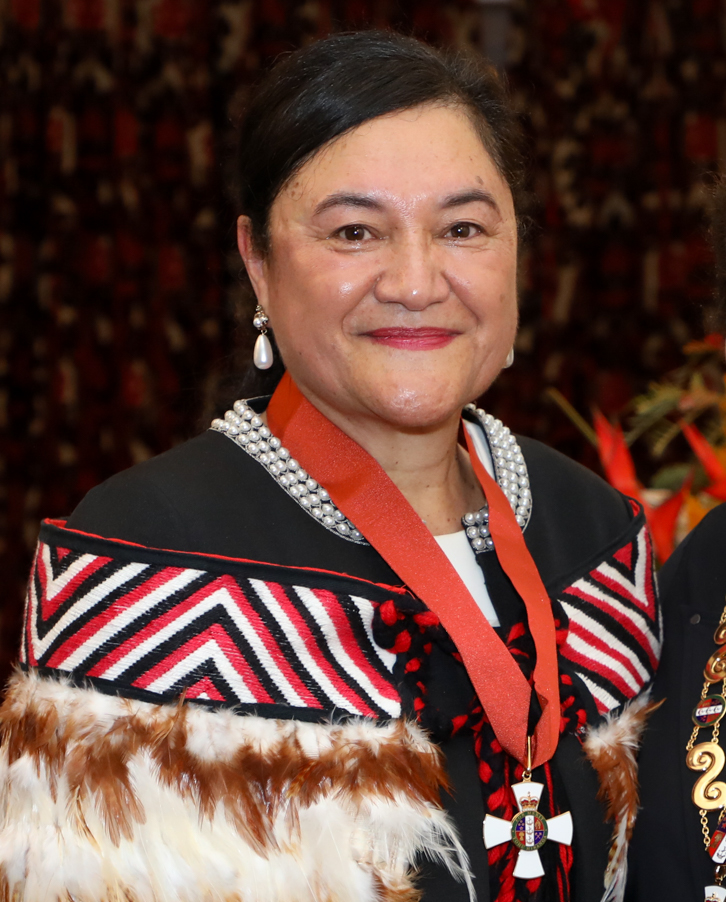
Arihia Bennett

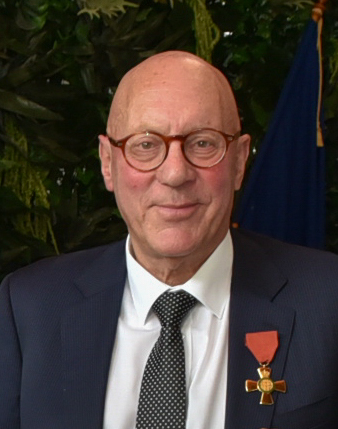
Jim Boult

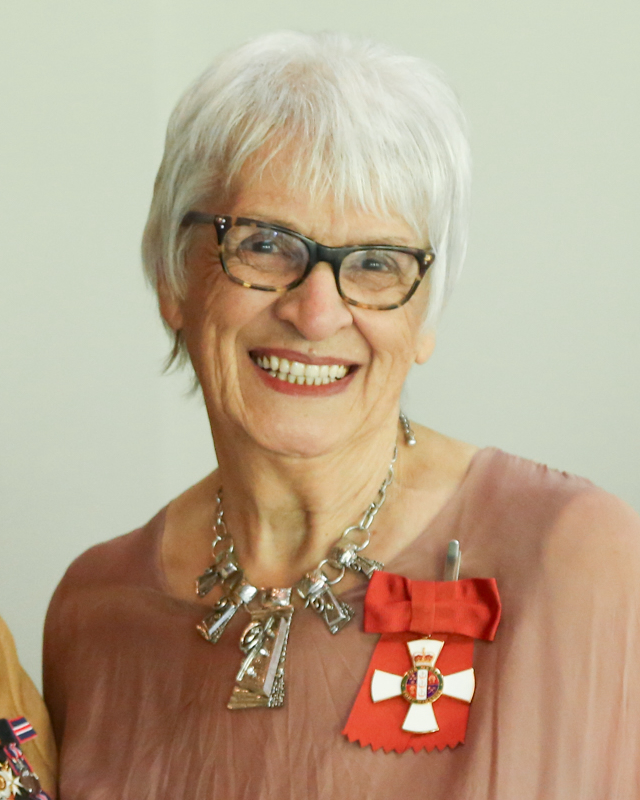
Anne Candy

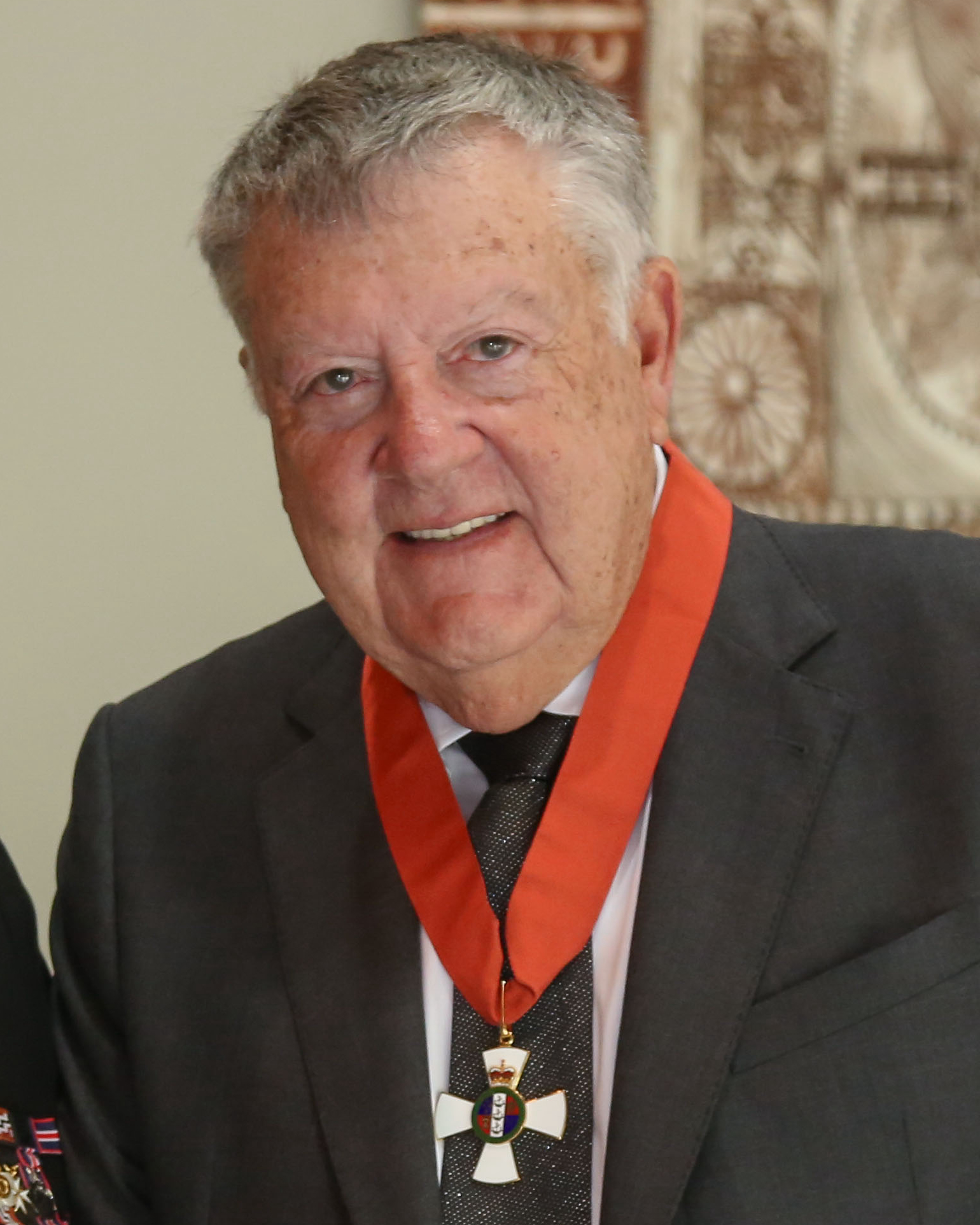
Rod Duke

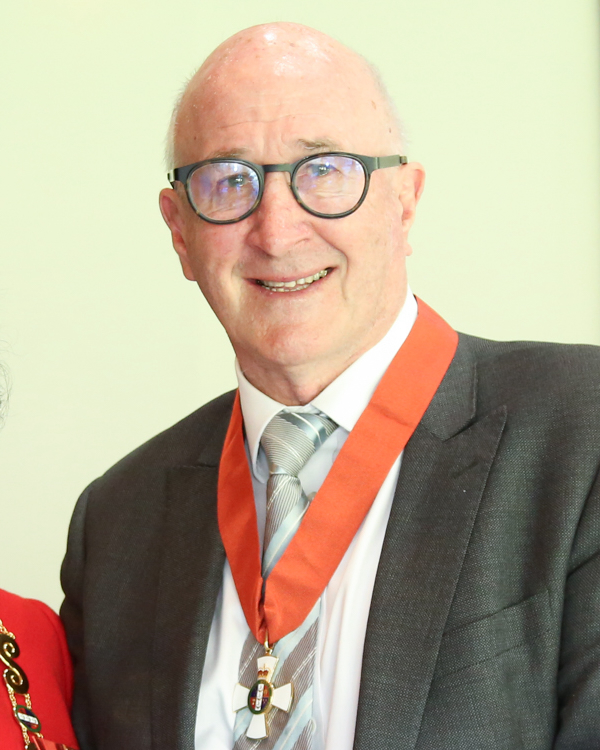
Bill Holland

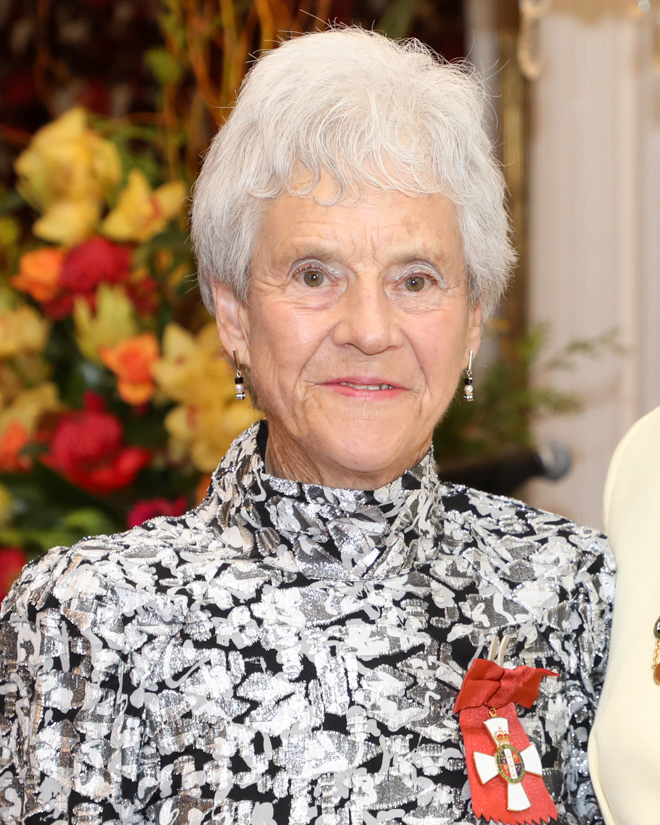
Mary Lee

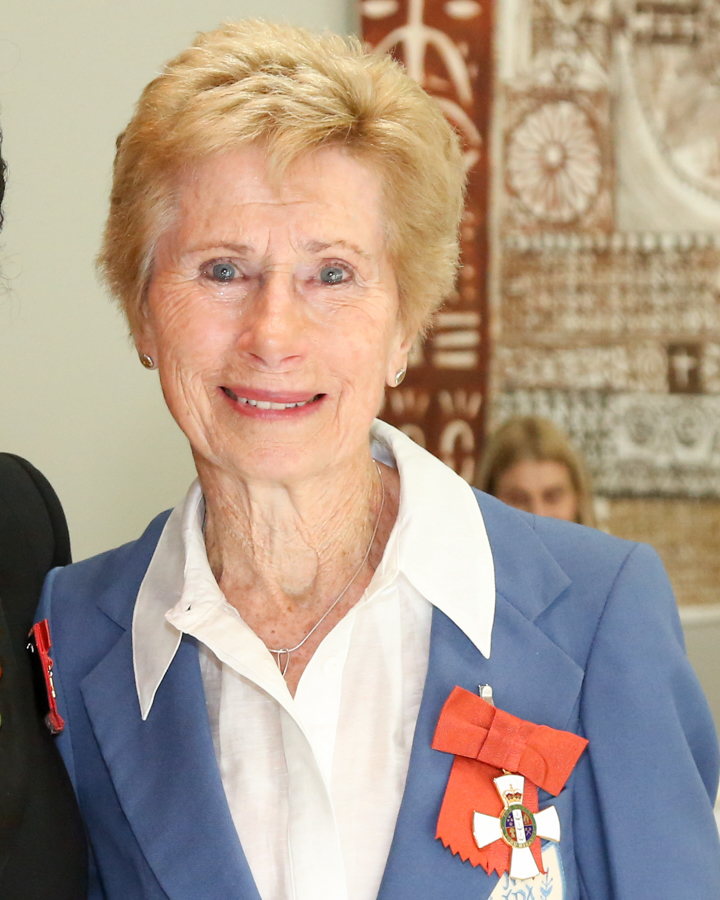
Lesley Milne

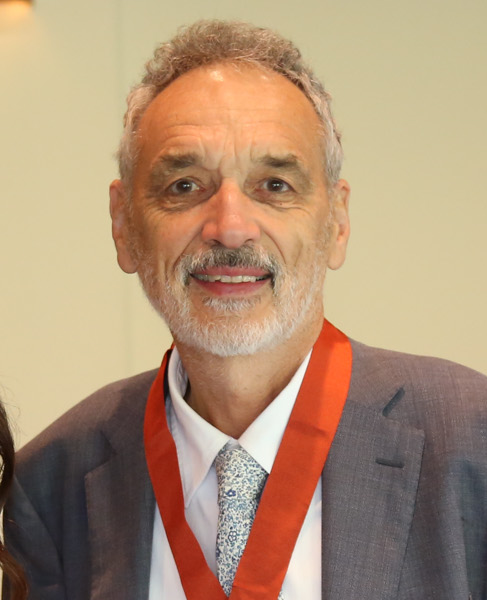
John Peek

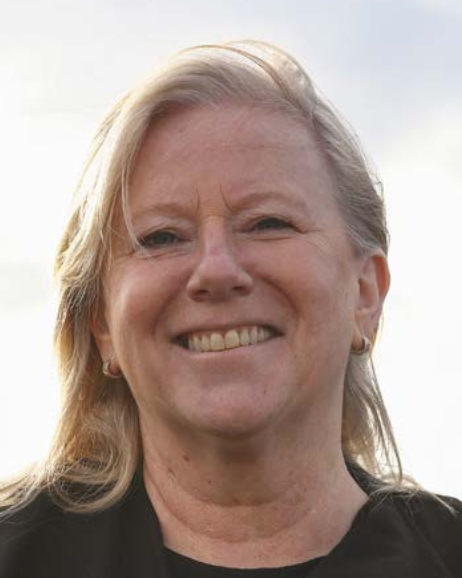
Katie Sadleir

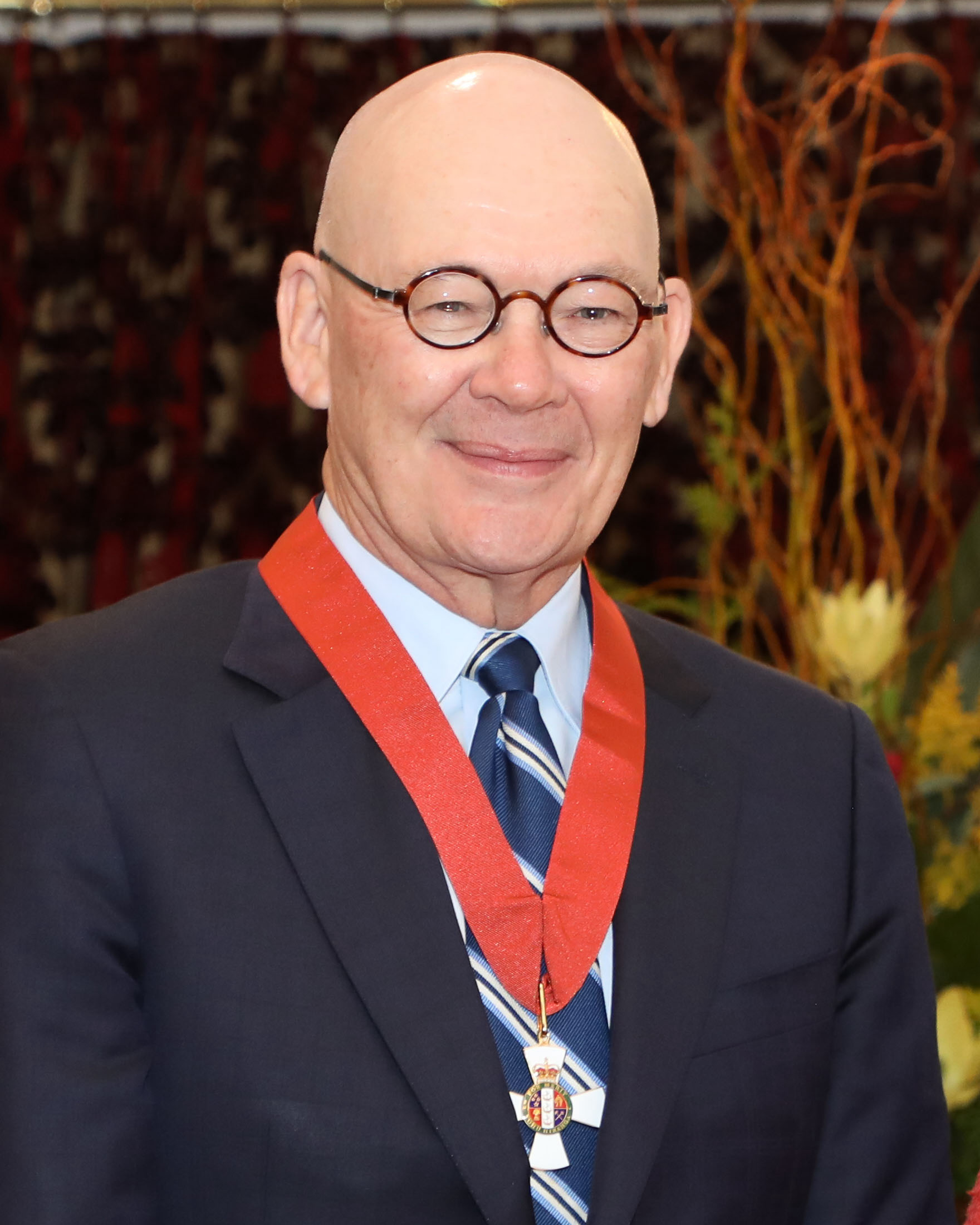
Chris Seed

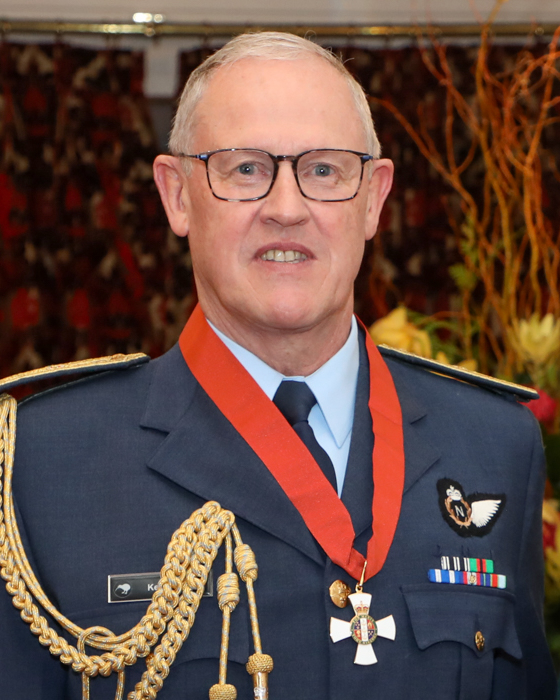
Kevin Short

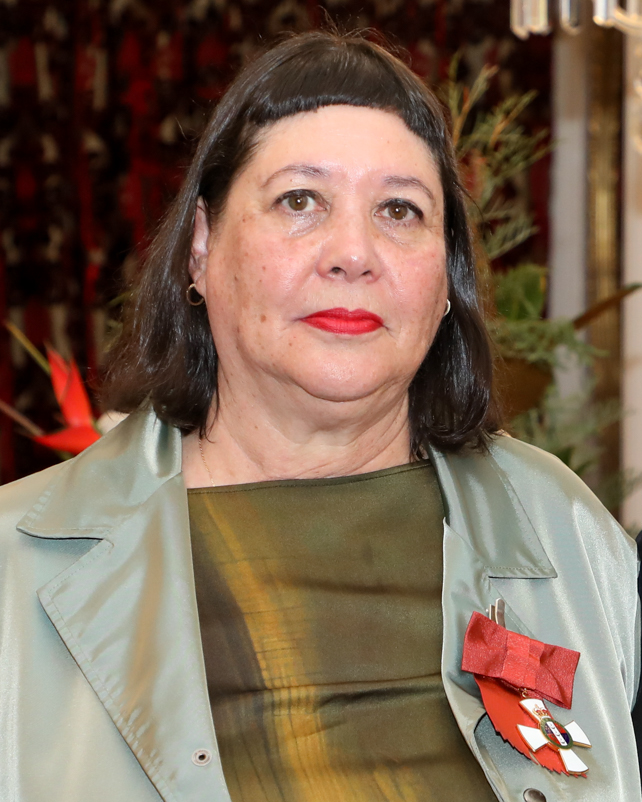
Megan Tamati‑Quennell

=== Officer (ONZM) ===
- Professor Fiona Margaret Alpass – of Palmerston North. For services to health psychology and seniors.
- Associate Professor Rohan Valentine Ameratunga – of Auckland. For services to immunology.
- Andrew Howard Barnes – of Waiheke Island. For services to business and philanthropy.
- Professor Ian Peter Bissett – of Auckland. For services to colorectal surgery and education.
- Andrea Jane Blair – of Taupō. For services to the geothermal industry and women.
- Dr Patricia Elizabeth Florence Bradbury – of Auckland. For services to sport and education.
- Richard Adrian Coon – of Picton. For services to business and philanthropy.
- Stephen Clifford Cox – of Ōhaupō. For services to cycling.
- Noel Llewellyn Davies – of Auckland. For services to engineering business and the community.
- Tanya Handley Drawbridge (Tanya Ashken) – of Wellington. For services to sculpture, silversmithing and jewellery.
- Andrew Scott Dunn – of Oamaru. For services to people with Parkinson’s disease.
- Peter Ralph Fegan JP – of Wānaka. For services to Fire and Emergency New Zealand and the community.
- Allison Elizabeth Ferguson – of Auckland. For services to netball.
- Meri Gibson – of Christchurch. For services to dragon boating and breast cancer awareness.
- Tere Ngawai Gilbert – of Hamilton. For services to early childhood and Māori language education.
- Gordon John Glentworth – of Hāwera. For services to the livestock and dairy industries.
- Ian Fraser Grant – of Masterton. For services to literature and historical preservation.
- Sarah Elizabeth Flora Haydon – of Warkworth. For services to people with disabilities.
- William Paul Jansen – of Porirua. For services to wildlife conservation.
- Robert David Jury – of Lower Hutt. For services to structural engineering and design.
- The Very Reverend Taimoanaifakaofo Kaio – of Auckland. For services to the Pacific community.
- Christopher John Lewis – of Newport Coast, California. For services to tennis.
- Patricia (Trish) Elizabeth Clare Lindsay – of Invercargill. For services to netball and governance.
- Alexander James (Jamie) Mackay – of Dunedin. For services to broadcasting and the rural community.
- Deborah Ann Manning – of Dunedin. For services to the community and the environment.
- Leslie Noel McCutcheon – of Levin. For services to the Thoroughbred and harness racing industries.
- Gemma Elizabeth New – of Atlanta, Georgia. For services to music direction.
- Dr Colin Francis John O’Donnell – of Christchurch. For services to wildlife conservation.
- Professor Nicola Sheila Peart – of Dunedin. For services to the law.
- Anapela Polataivao – of Auckland. For services to Pacific performing arts.
- Professor Phillippa Jane Poole – of Auckland. For services to medical education.
- Dr William Howell Round – of Hamilton. For services to medical physics and biomedical engineering.
- Professor Christine Vivienne Stephens – of Waikanae. For services to health psychology and seniors.
- Lisa Jadwiga Valentina Warrington – of Dunedin. For services to theatre and education.
- Dr Murray John Williams – of Paekākāriki. For services to wildlife conservation and science.
- Sheryll Christine Wilson – of Christchurch. For services to early childhood education.
- Adrienne Karen Winkelmann – of Auckland. For services to the fashion industry.
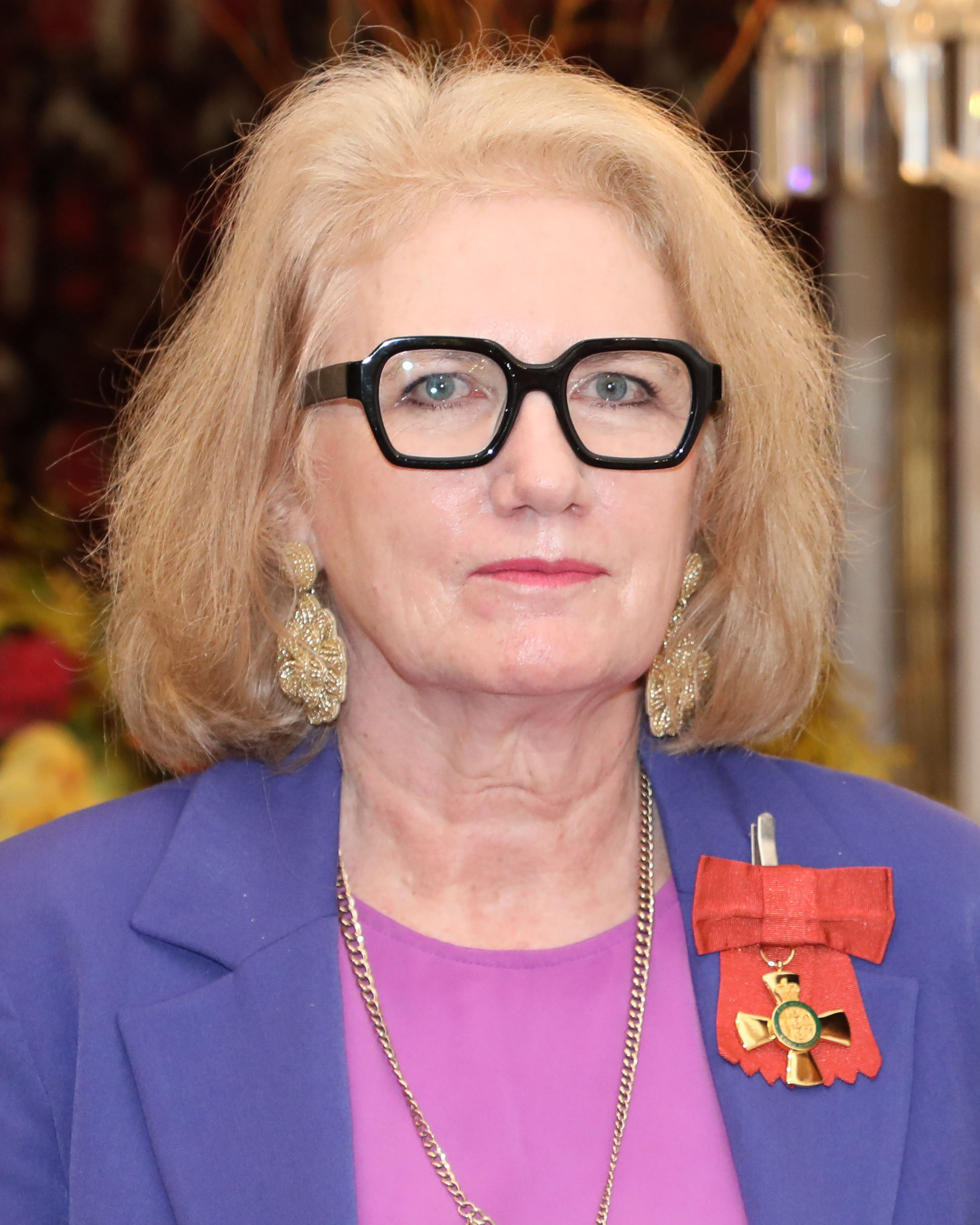
Fiona Alpass

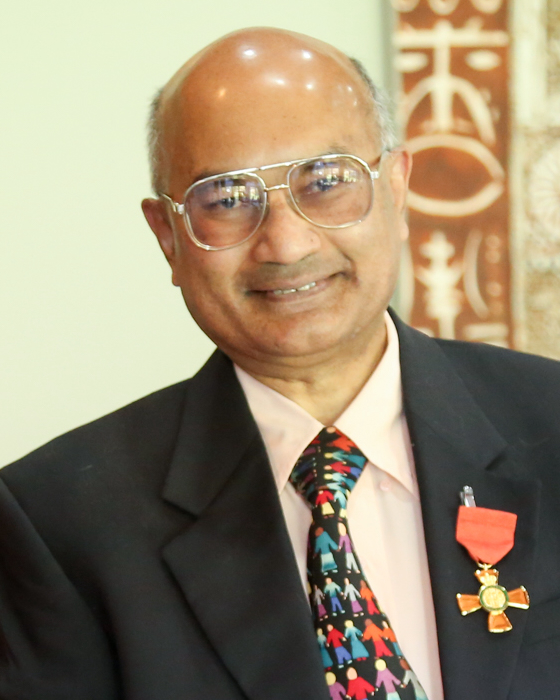
Rohan Ameratunga

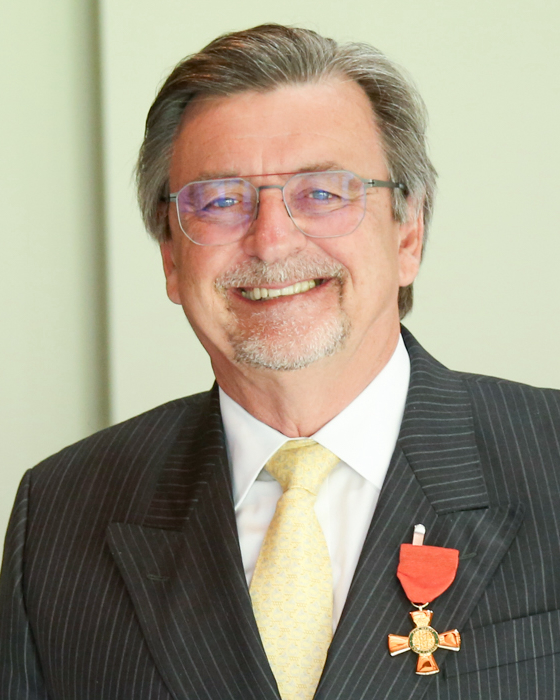
Andrew Barnes

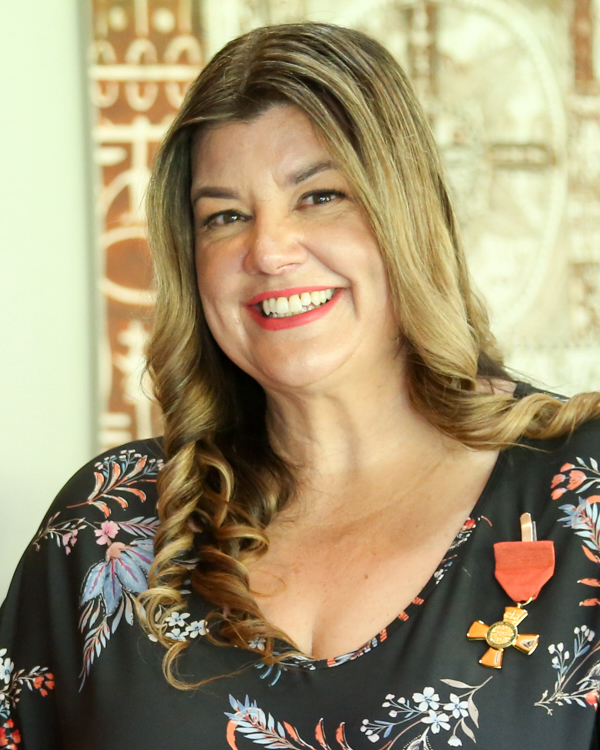
Andrea Blair

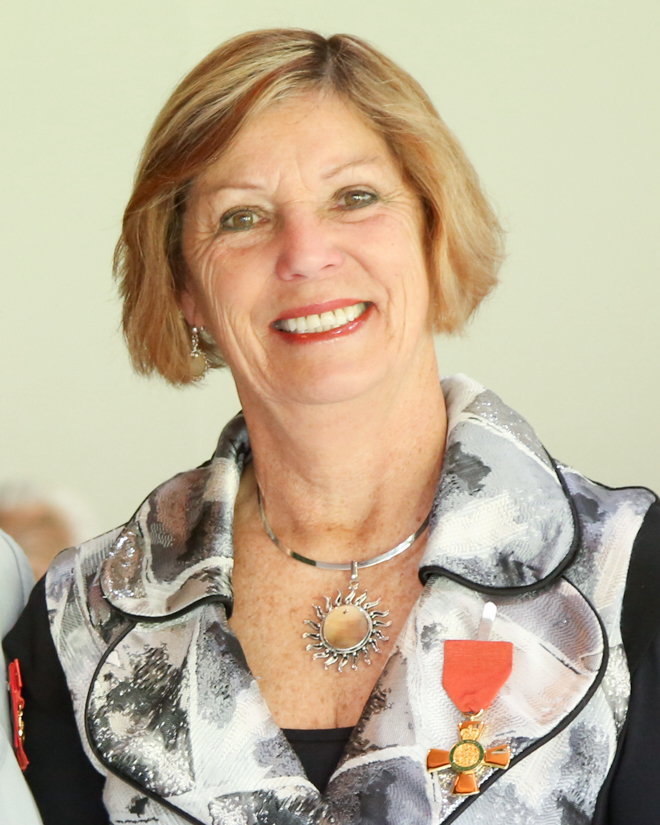
Trish Bradbury

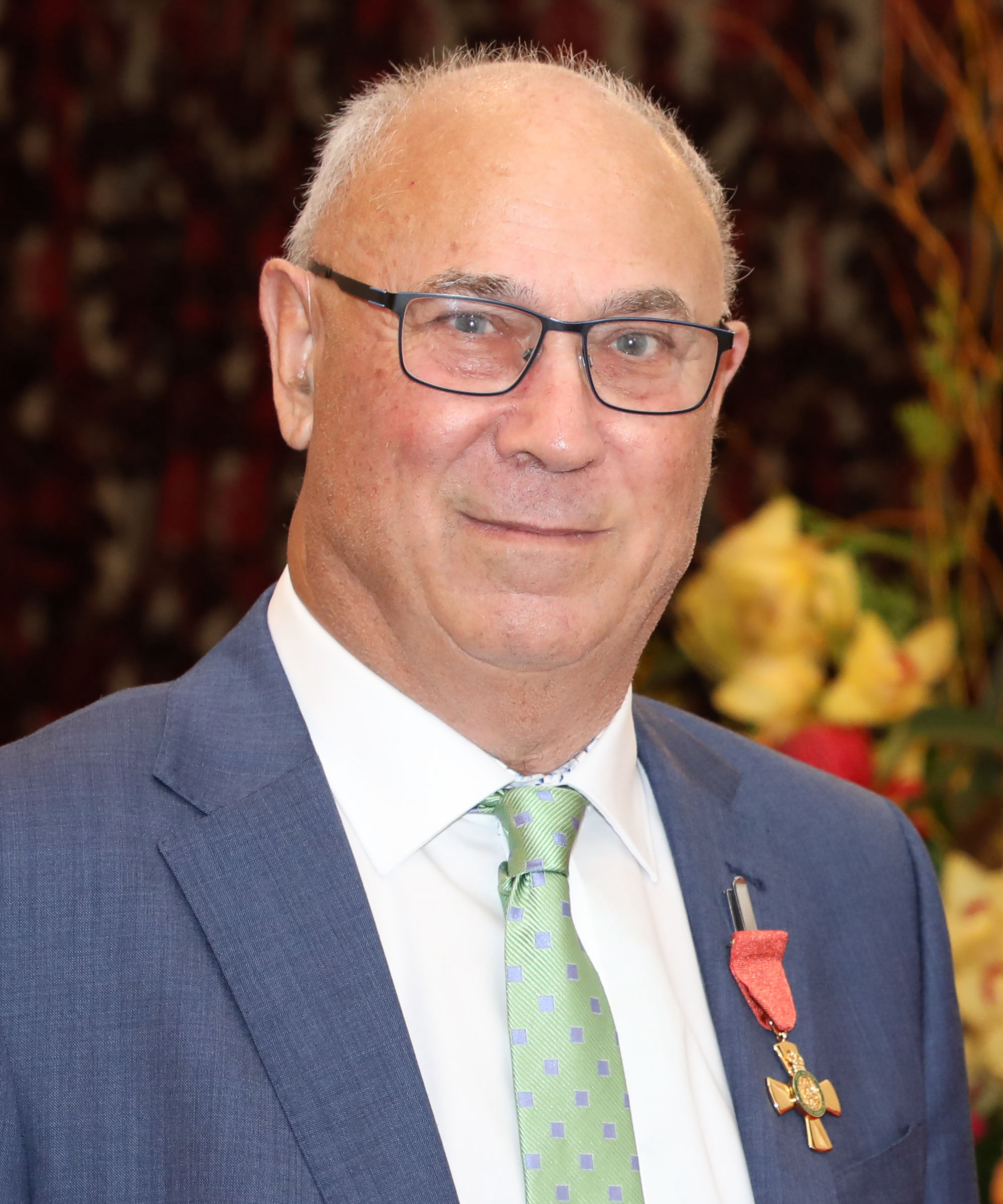
Richard Coon

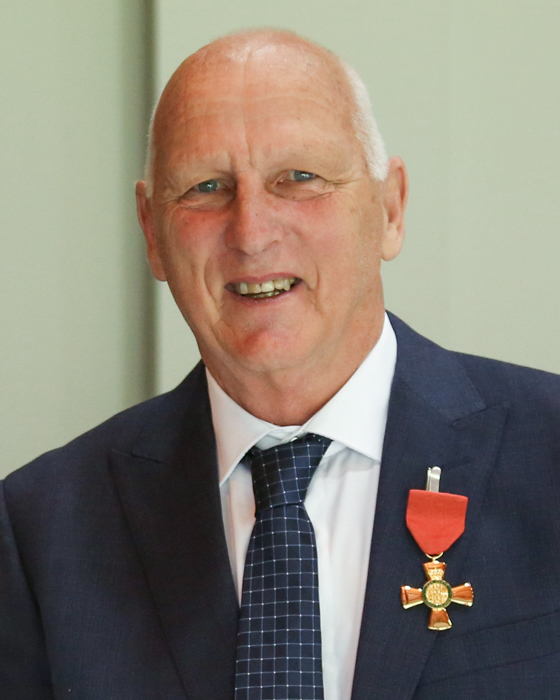
Stephen Cox

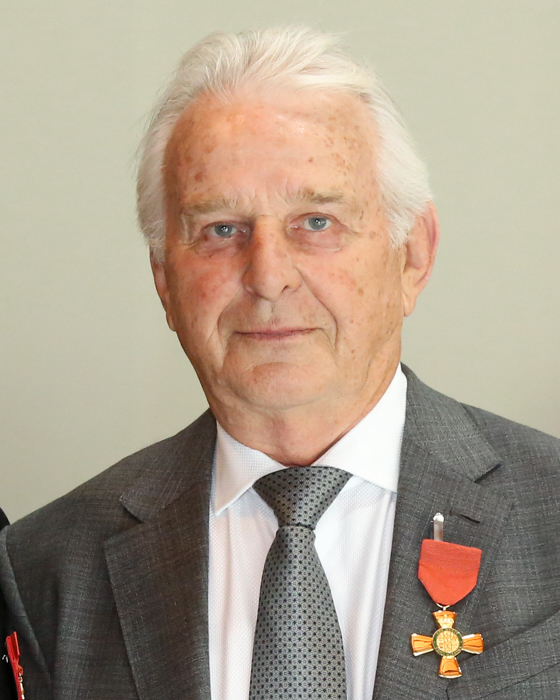
Noel Davies

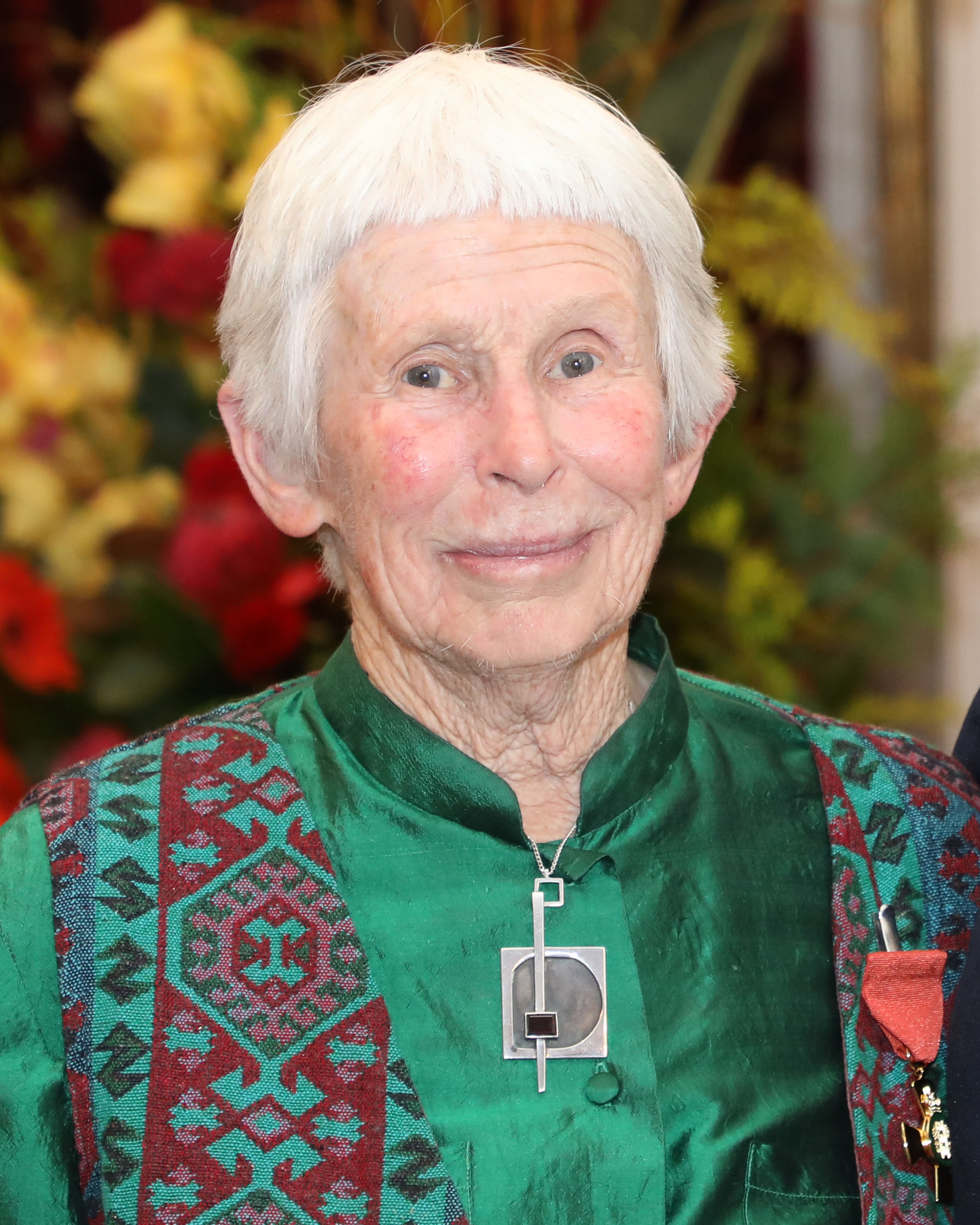
Tanya Ashken

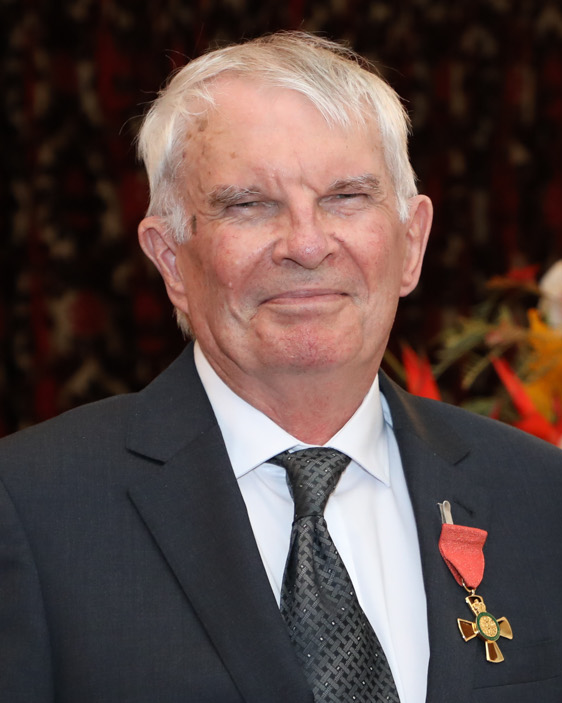
Andrew Dunn

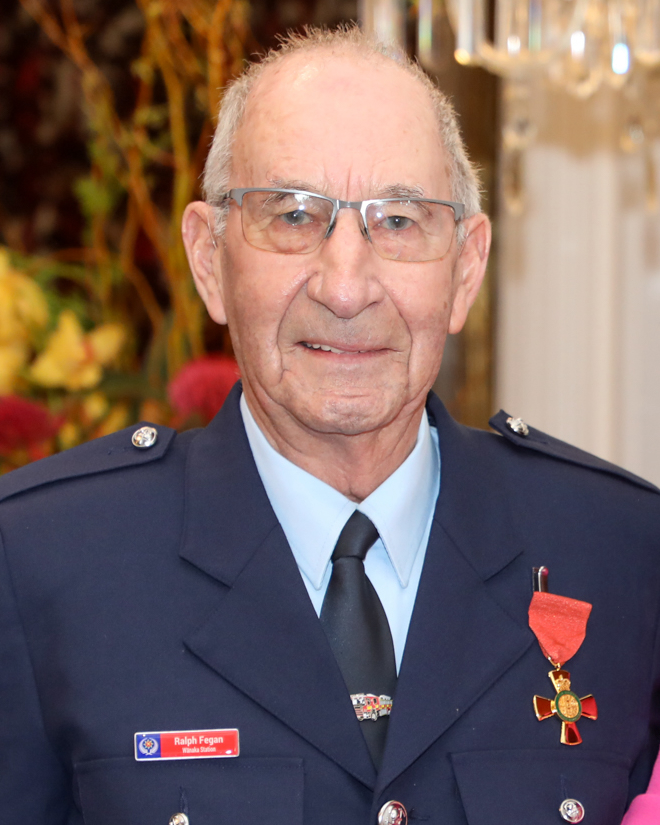
Ralph Fegan

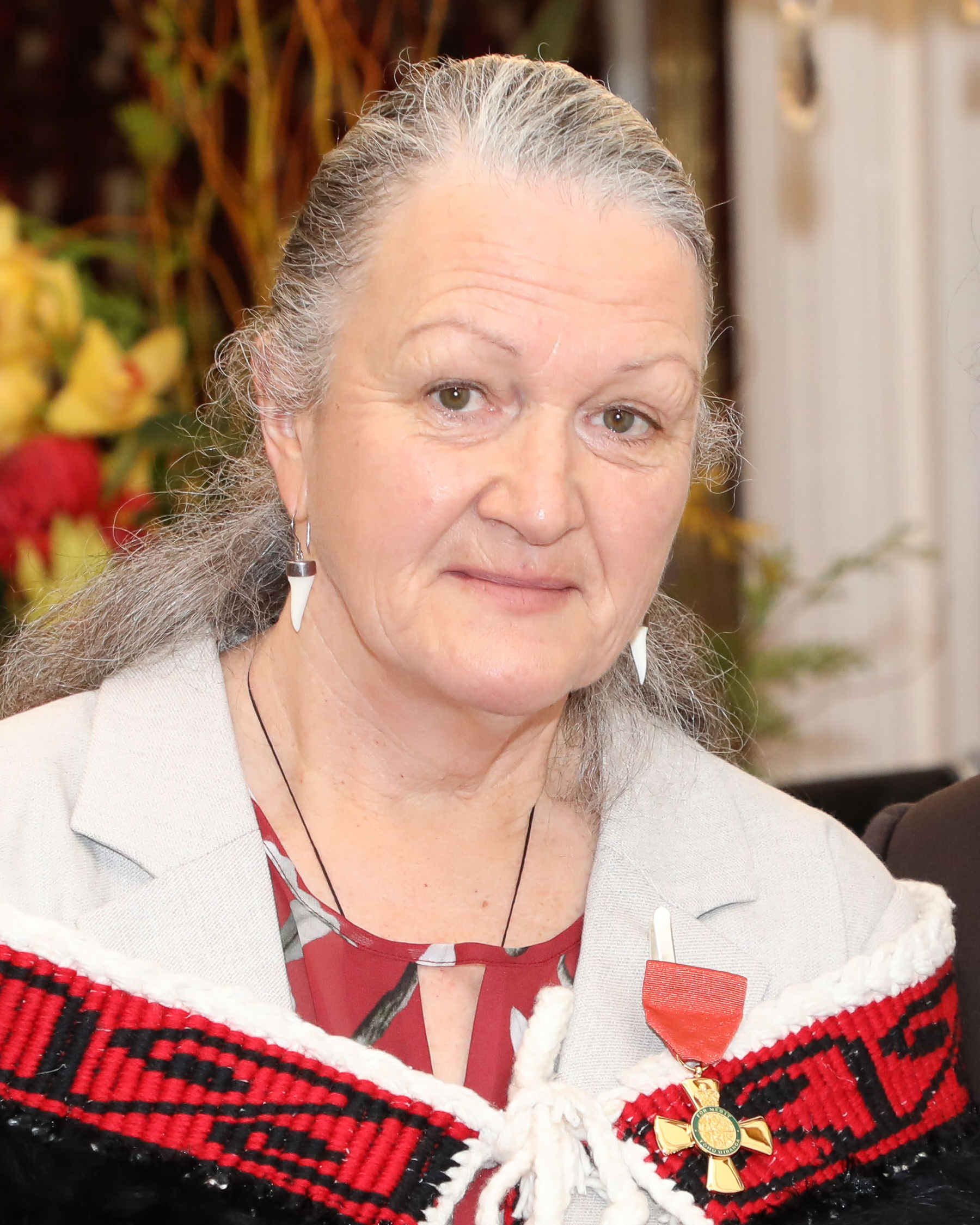
Tere Gilbert

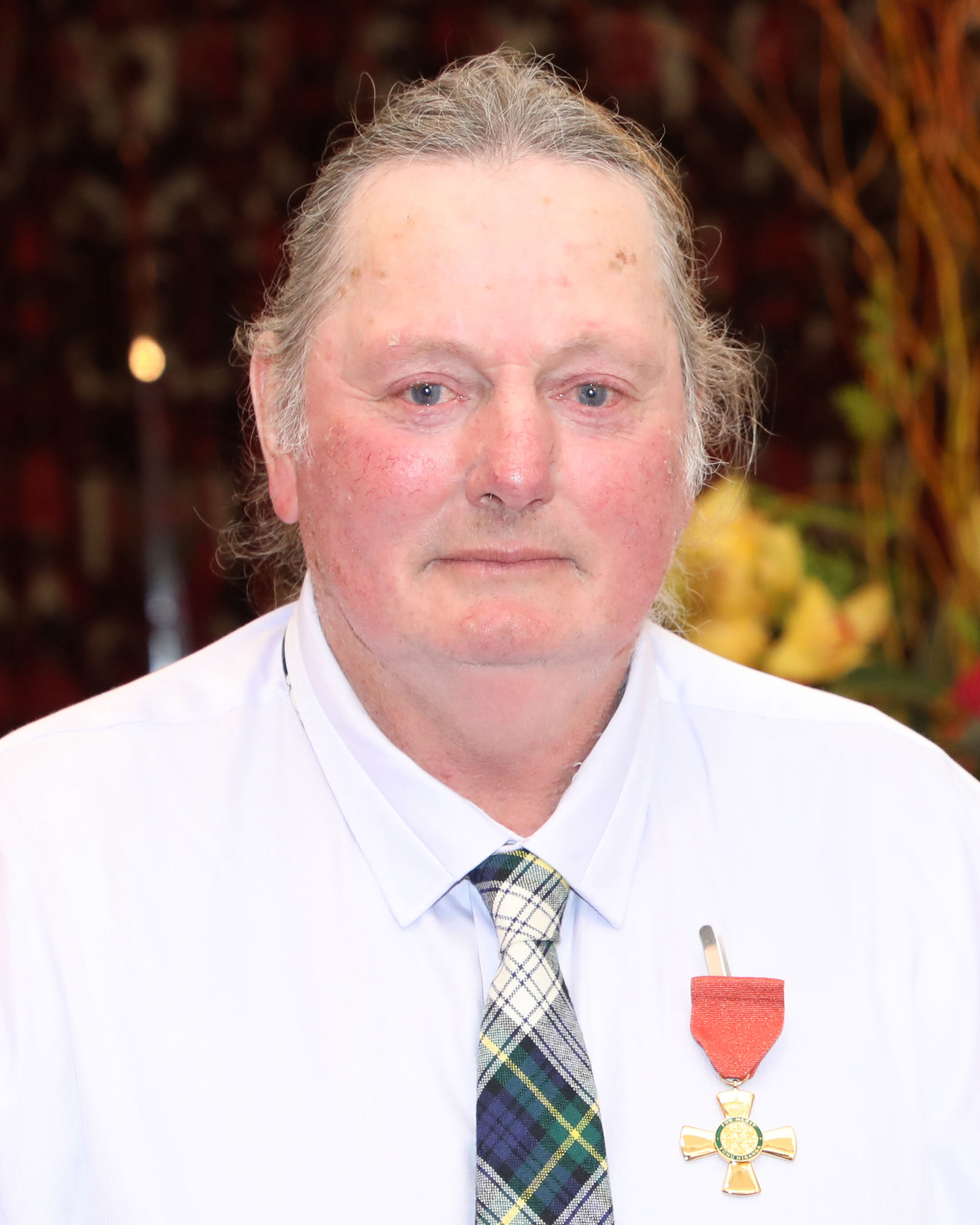
Gordon Glentworth

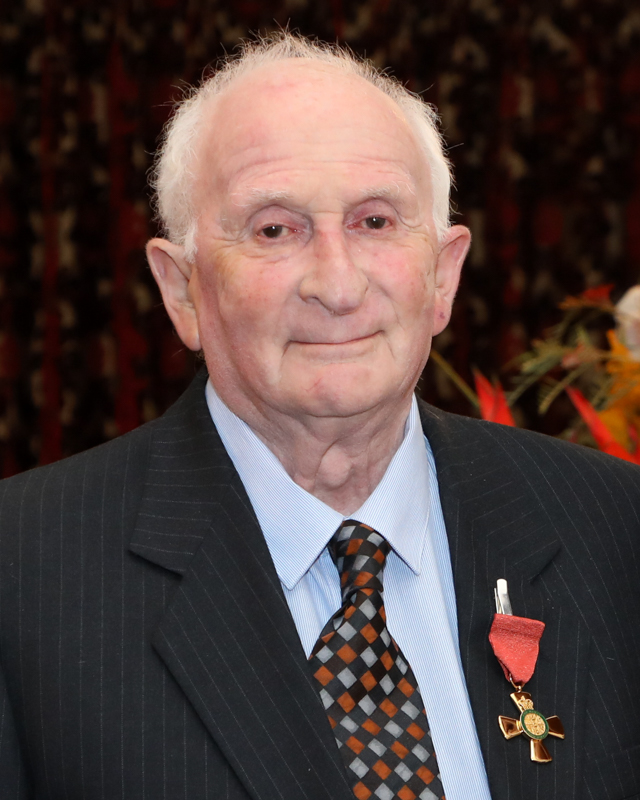
Ian Grant

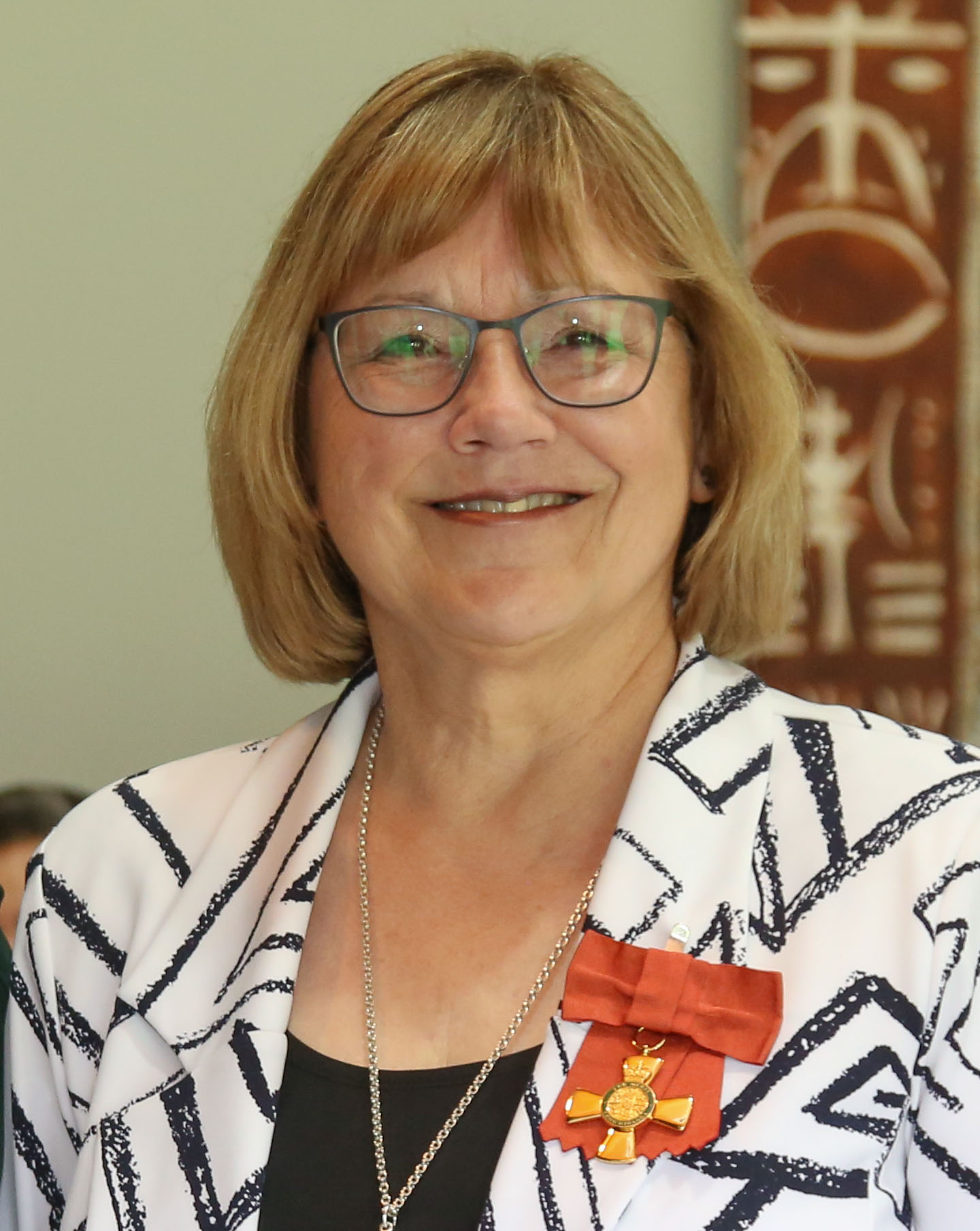
Sarah Haydon

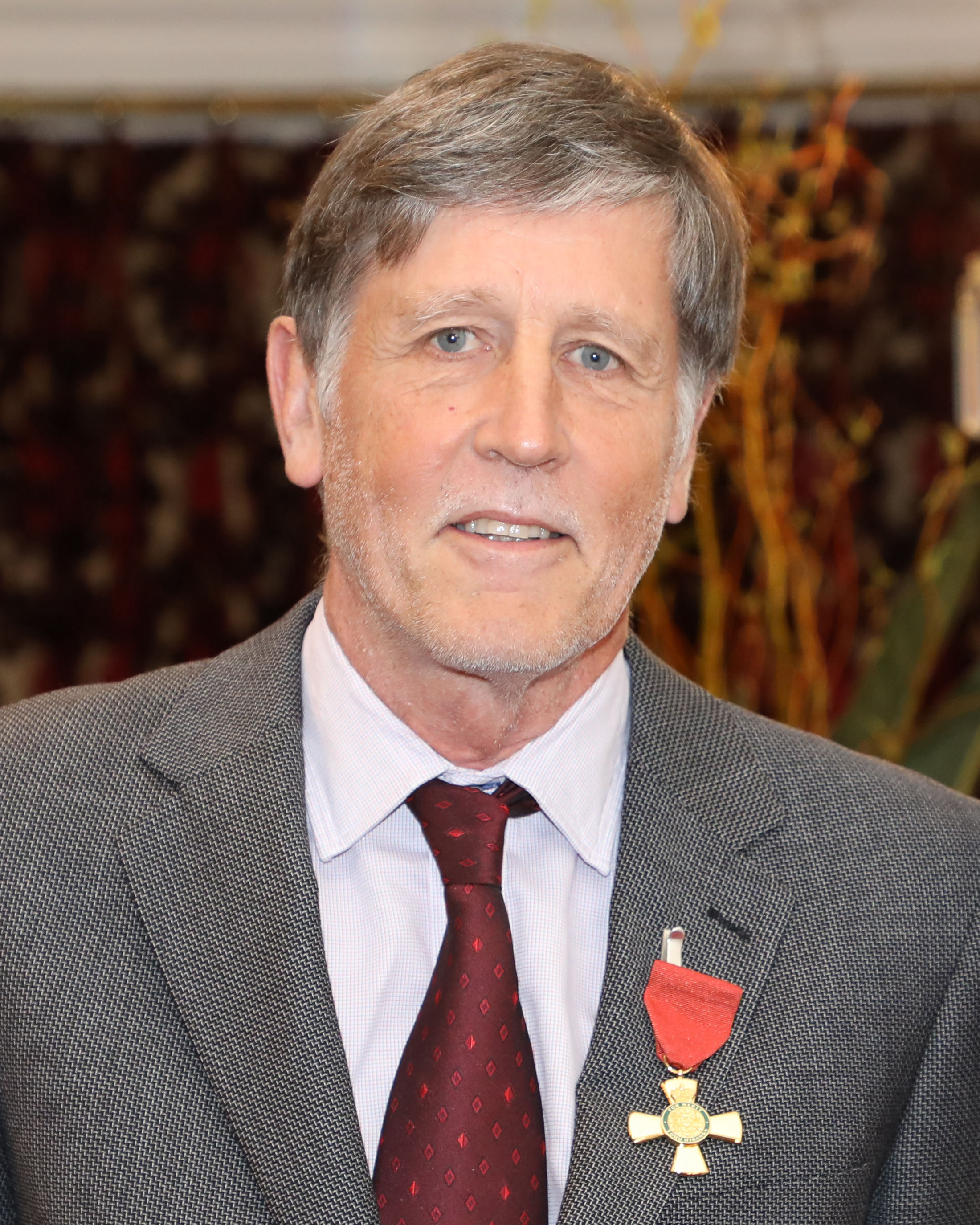
Scratch Jansen

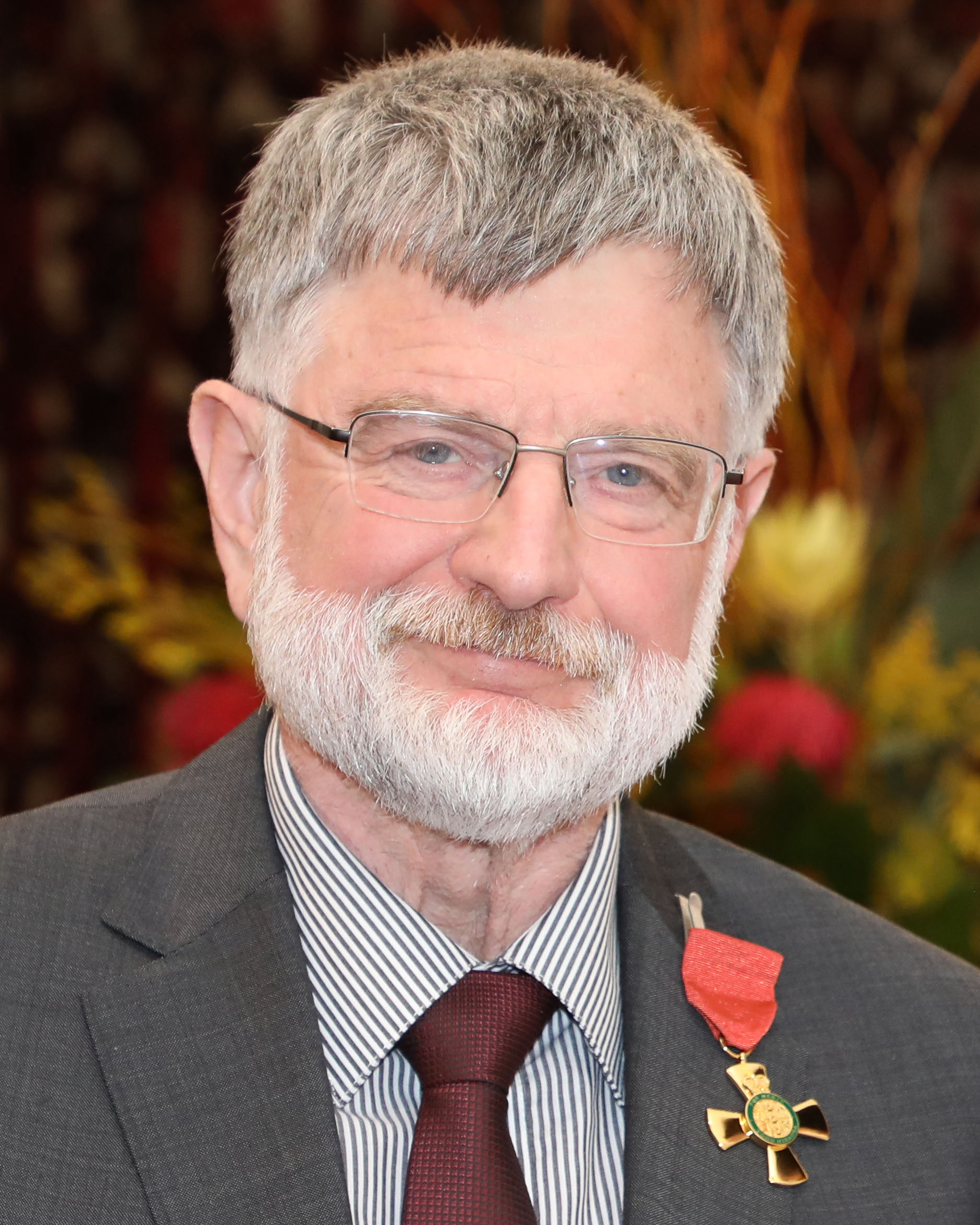
Rob Jury

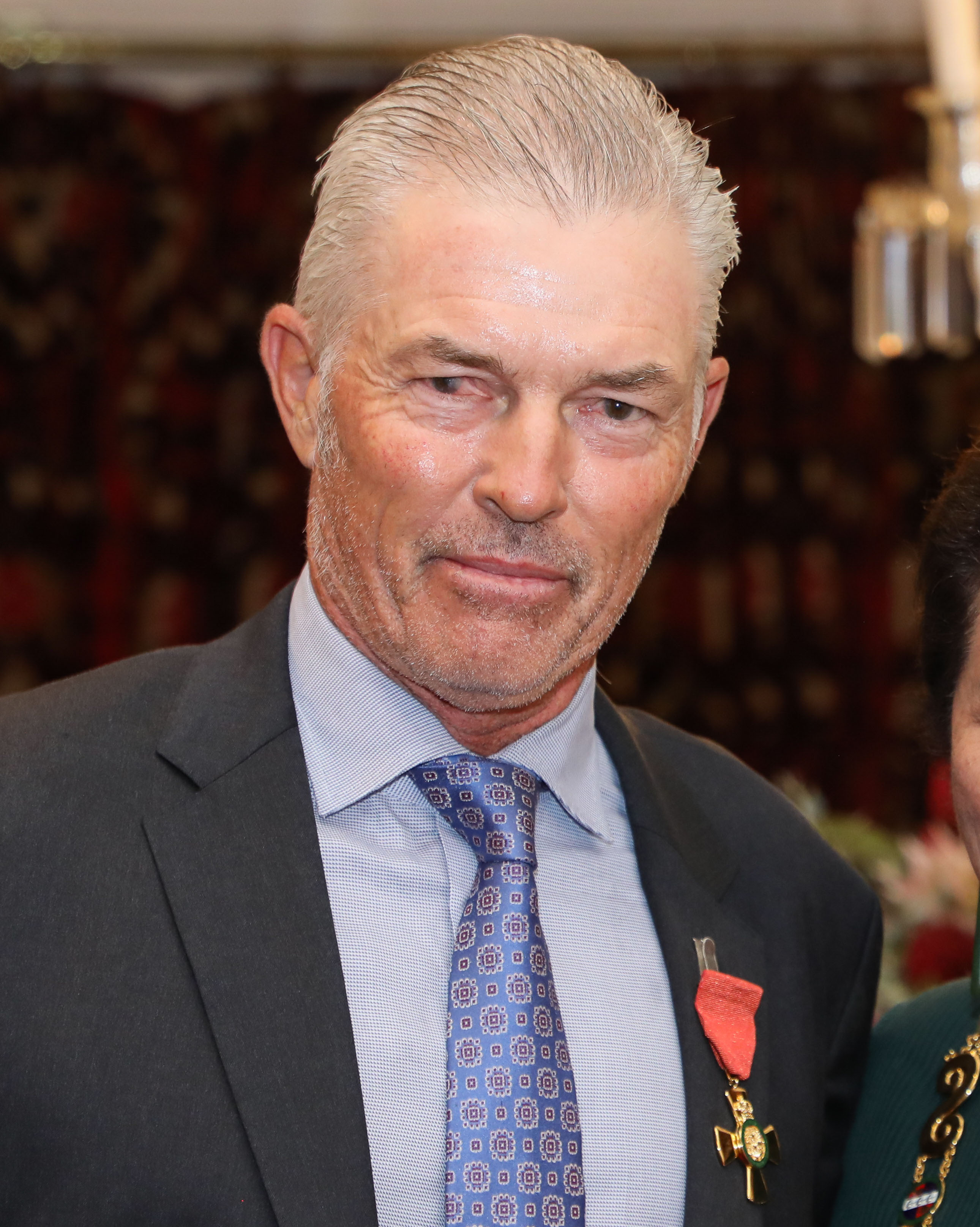
Chris Lewis

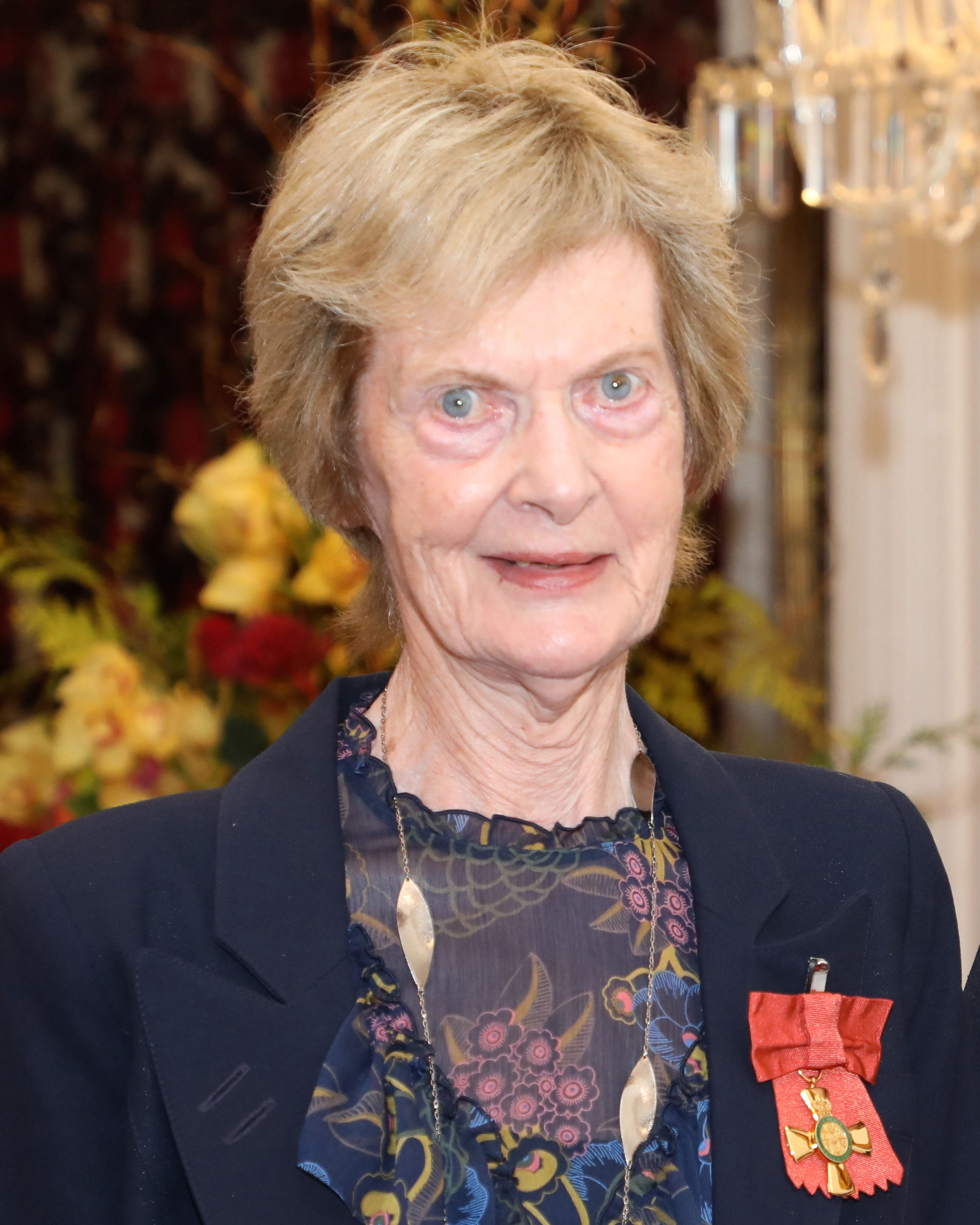
Trish Lindsay

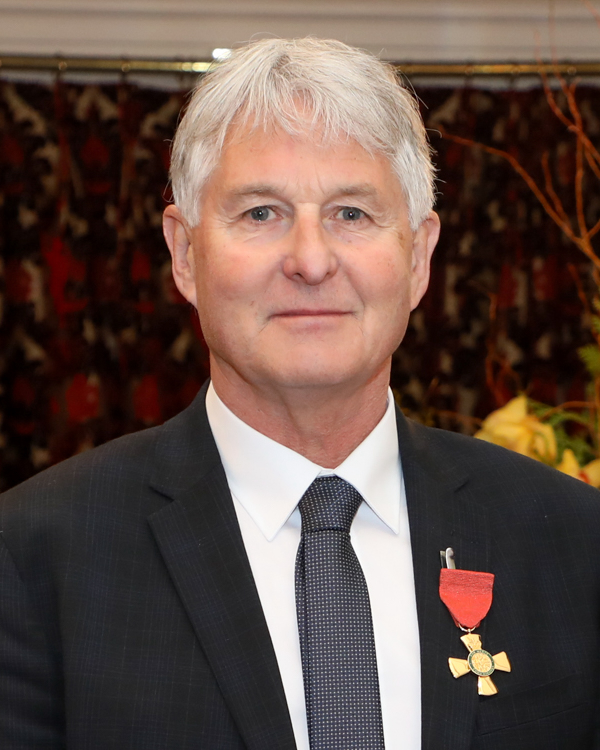
Jamie Mackay

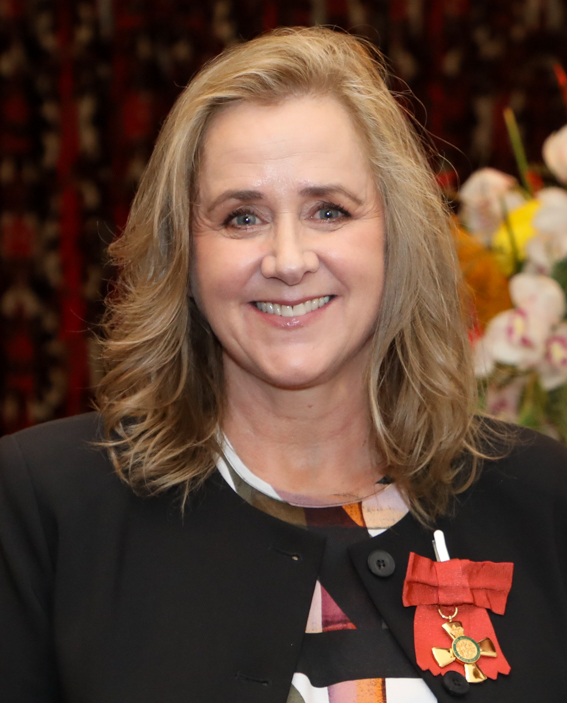
Deborah Manning

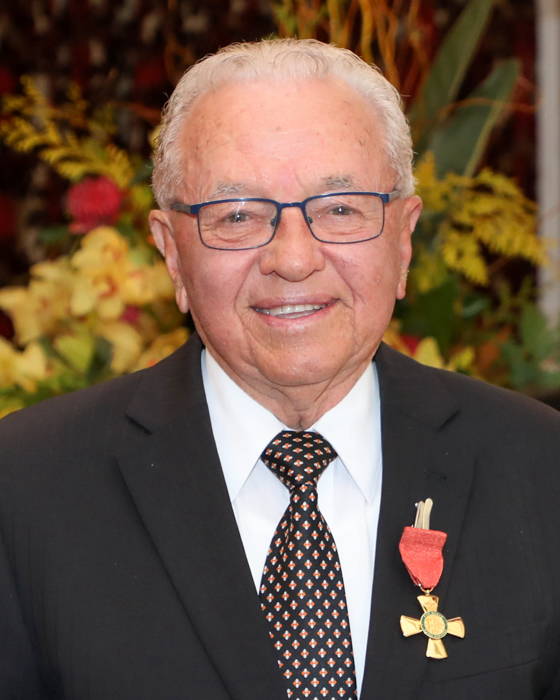
Noel McCutcheon

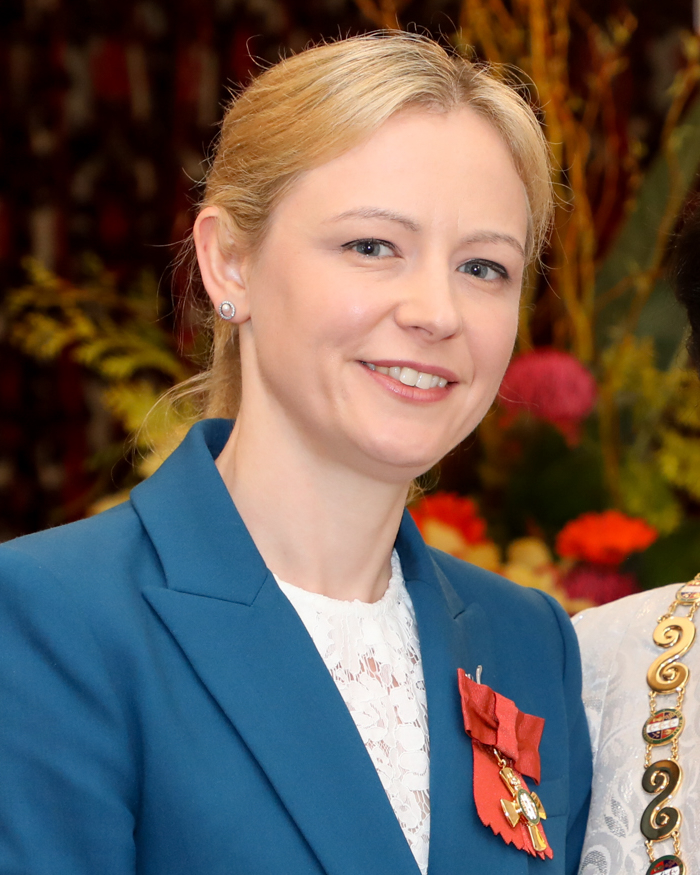
Gemma New

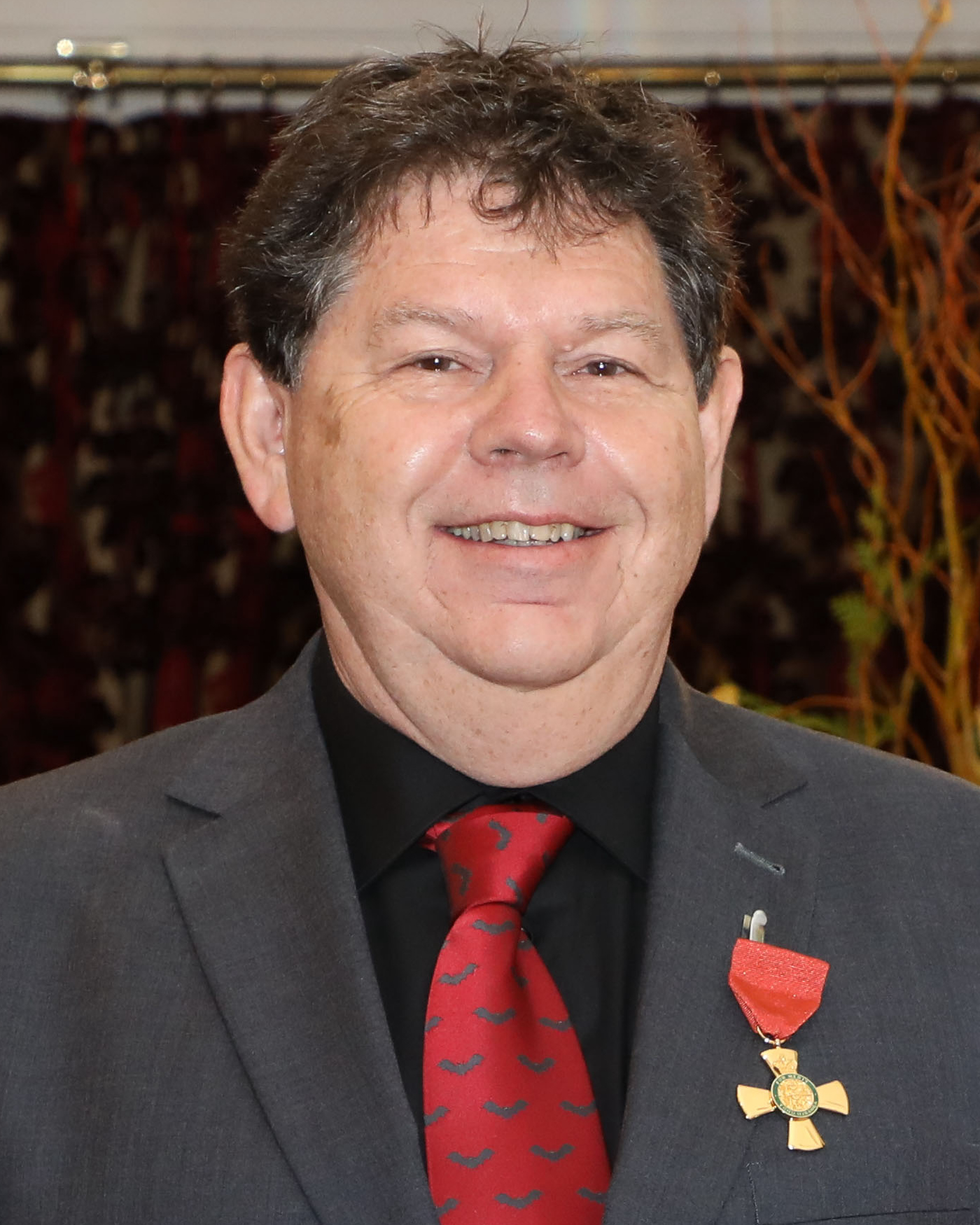
Colin O'Donnell

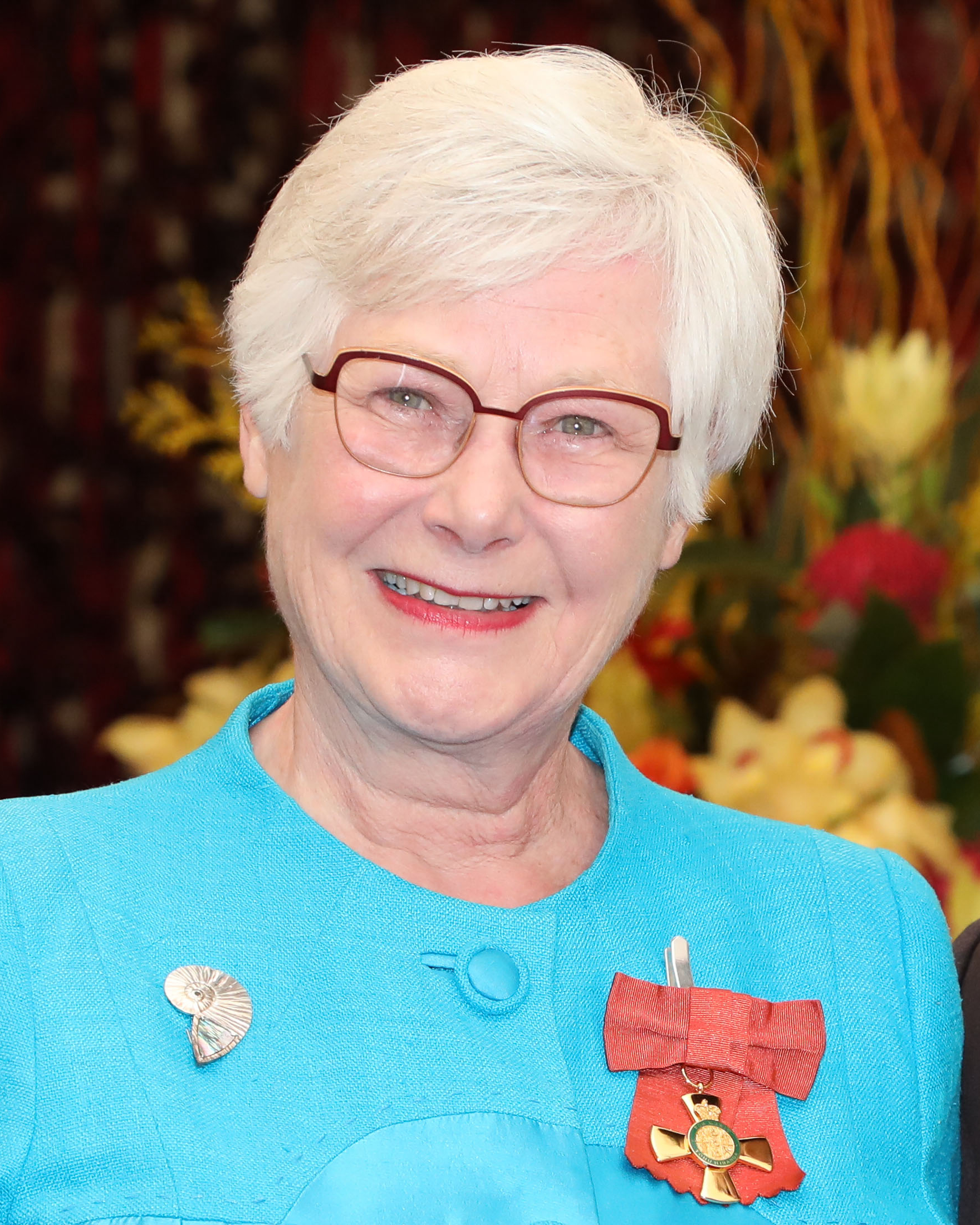
Nicola Peart

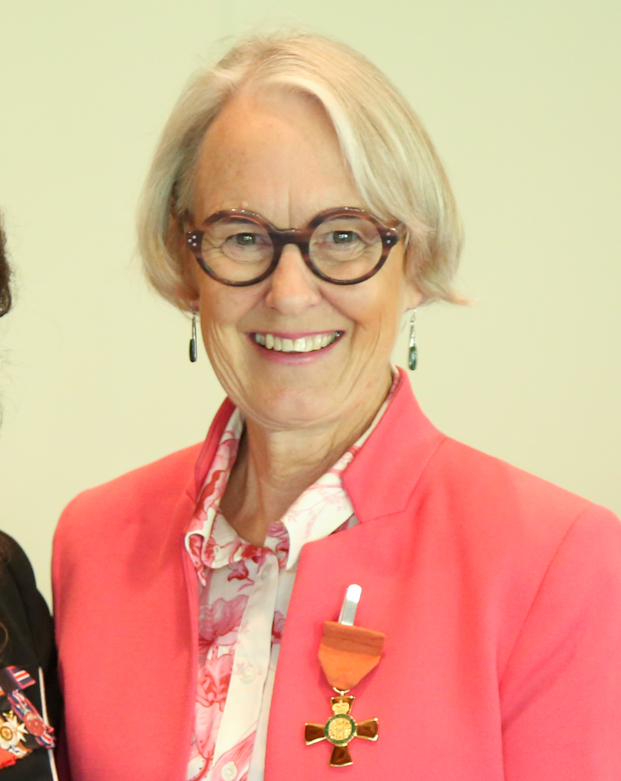
Phillippa Poole

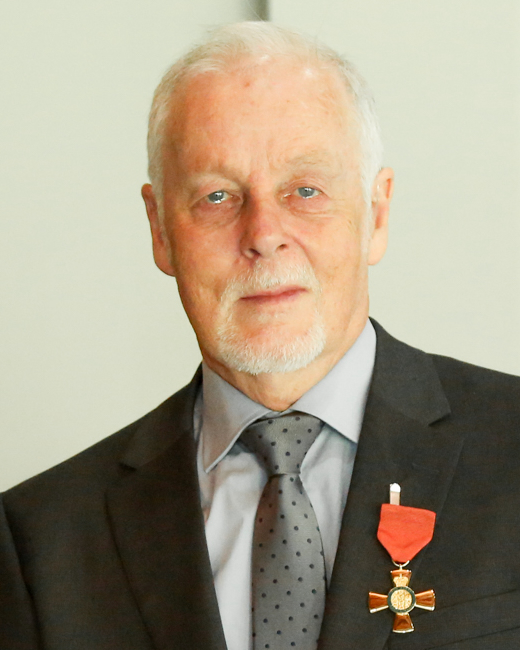
Howell Round

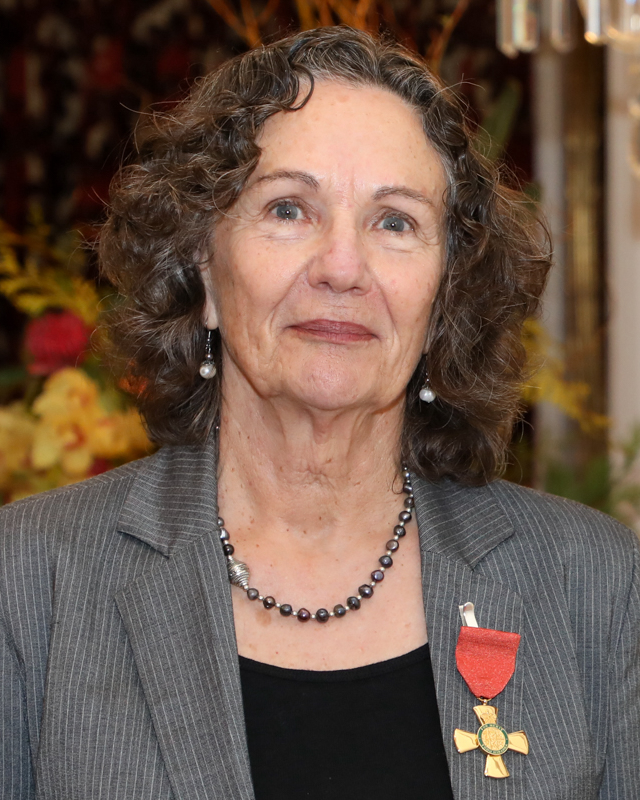
Christine Stephens

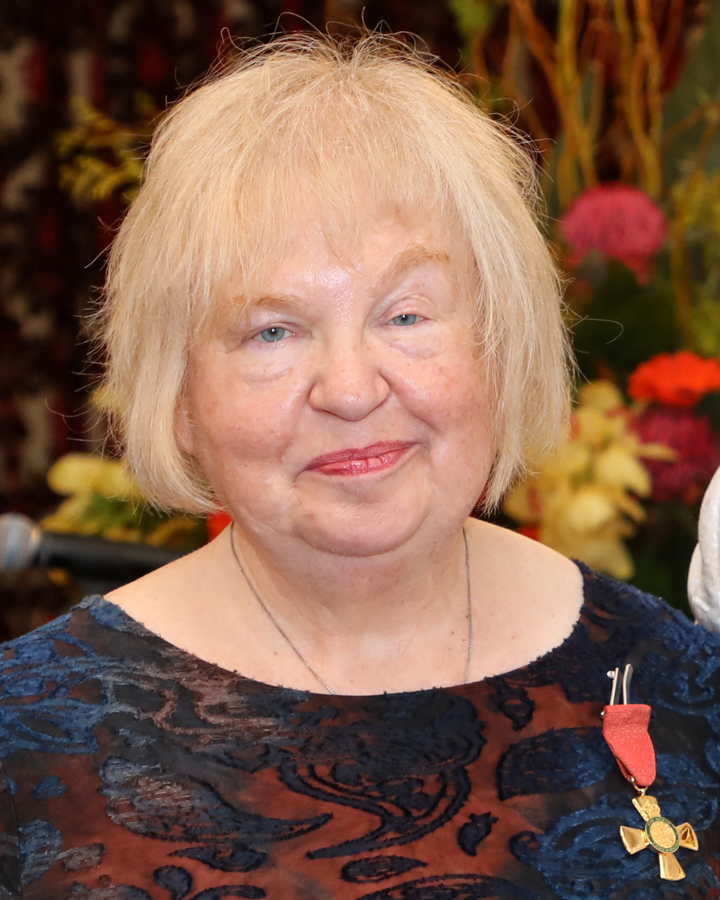
Lisa Warrington

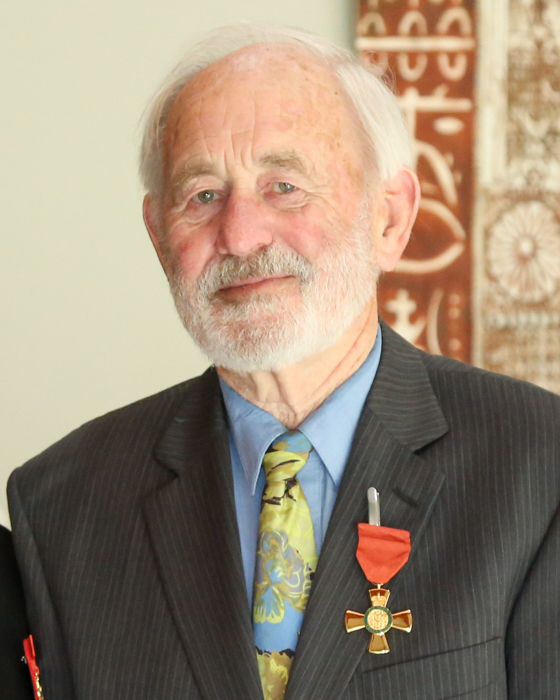
Murray Williams

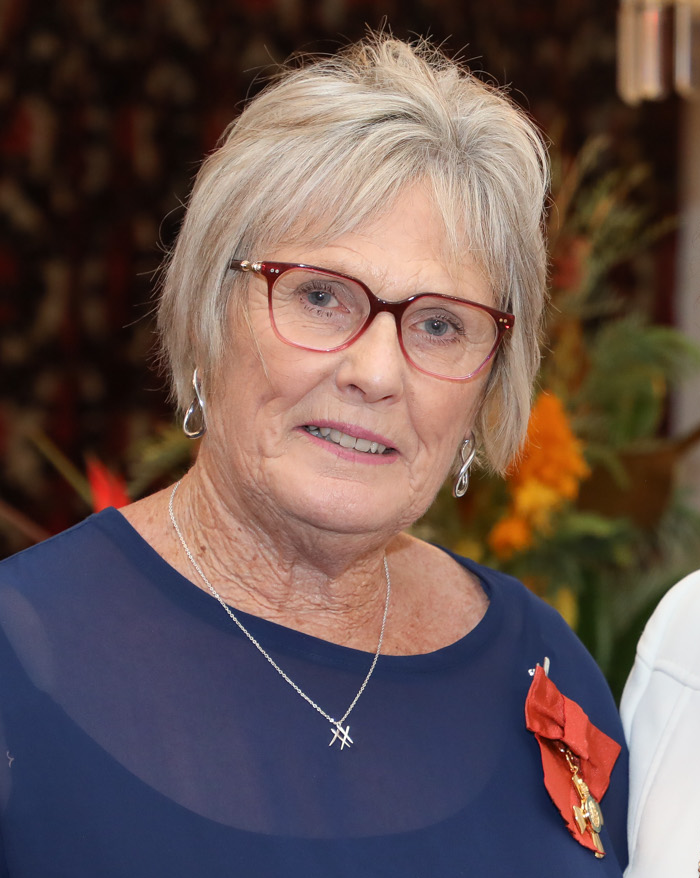
Sherryll Wilson

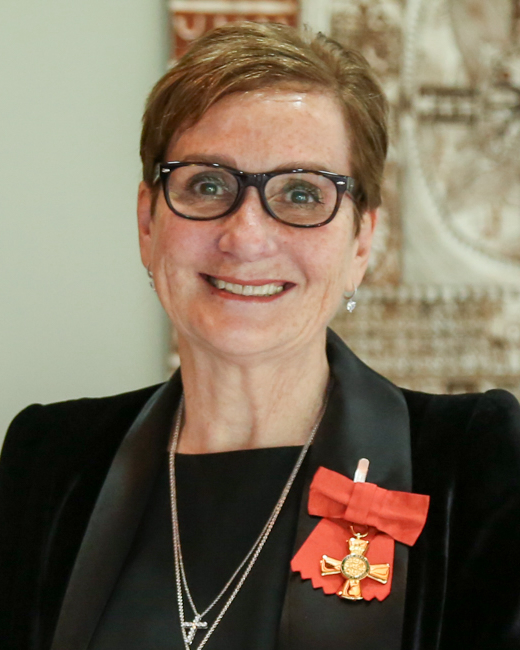
Adrienne Winkelmann

=== Member (MNZM) ===
- Jeanette Mary Banfield – of Paraparaumu. For services to philately.
- Karen Lee Bartlett – of Havelock North. For services to the community and social services.
- Dr Suzanne Joy Yerex Blackwell – of Auckland. For services to clinical and forensic psychology and the law.
- Barry James Britten Brown – of Auckland. For services to structural engineering.
- Jane Caroline Cartwright – of Christchurch. For services to health governance.
- Frank Philip Chapman – of Nelson. For services to health.
- I-Hua (Eva) Chen – of Auckland. For services to the Asian community.
- Phillip Ching Chuen Lam – of Auckland. For services to martial arts.
- Christine Margaret Clark – of Ashburton. For services to alcohol and drug harm reduction.
- Professor John Patrick Vincent Collins – of Auckland. For services to surgical education and breast cancer management.
- Fleur Barbara Corbett – of Kerikeri. For services to conservation.
- Thomas Leslie John Coyle – of Kaukapakapa. For services to the New Zealand Police, disaster victim identification and theatre.
- Mark Bryan Crompton – of Hokitika. For services to meteorology and the community.
- Detective Niall Patrick Deehan – of Paraparaumu. For services to the New Zealand Police.
- James Alexander Doy – of Auckland. For services to theatre, particularly youth theatre.
- Anthony John Dreaver – of Paraparaumu. For services to the community.
- Reid Fletcher – of Gisborne. For services to the wine industry.
- Brian George Foley – of Dunedin. For services to the plumbing industry and the community.
- Ian Edward Godfrey – of Auckland. For services to surf lifesaving and water safety education.
- Keith Raymond Gordon – of Albany. For services to diving and maritime history.
- Inspector Freda Anne Grace – of Wellington. For services to the New Zealand Police.
- Elizabeth Mary Greive – of Auckland. For services to child poverty reduction.
- John Warner Haldane – of Whakatāne. For services to arts administration, particularly music.
- Grant Arthur Harrison – of Whangārei. For services to volleyball.
- David Henshaw – of Lyttelton. For services to archery.
- Dr Barbara Eva Hochstein – of Rotorua. For services to radiology and education.
- Jolie Hodson – of Auckland. For services to business, governance and women.
- Leigh Allen Hopper – of Whitianga. For services to property development and philanthropy.
- Kerry Noel Henry Hudson – of Gisborne. For services to land management.
- The Venerable Joseph Anthony Huta – of Rotorua. For services to the Anglican Church, Māori and the community.
- Dianne Patricia John – of Picton. For services to ornithology.
- Keith Jones – of Lower Hutt. For services to metrology.
- Stephen Emil Kafka – of Tauranga. For services to conservation and wildlife research.
- Bridget Piu Kauraka – of Wellington. For services to the Cook Islands community.
- Rex Kerr – of Paraparaumu. For services to the community and rugby.
- Murray Grant King – of Richmond. For services to the dairy industry.
- Frederick James Lewis – of Gisborne. For services to philanthropy and sport.
- Samuel Lewis – of Te Awamutu. For services to business and the community.
- Hun Kuk Lim – of Auckland. For services to the Korean community.
- Jee Chin Lim (Venerable Abbess Manshin) – of Auckland. For services to the community.
- Allister Morrison Macgregor – of Edendale. For services to pipe bands.
- Allan John (Allen) McCaw – of Milton. For services to the apiculture industry.
- Anthony William McGovern – of Cambridge. For services to the racing industry.
- John Trevlyn McKenzie – of Dunedin. For services to education.
- Lorraine Cranmer Mentz – of Auckland. For services to education and philanthropy.
- Ereti Paku Mitchell – of Perth, Scotland. For services to New Zealand–United Kingdom relations.
- Maureen Shirley Morris – of Whangārei. For services to nursing.
- Vivian Warburton Naylor – of Auckland. For services to people with disabilities.
- Linda Rosemary Nelson JP – of Auckland. For services to people with intellectual disabilities.
- Frances Mary Latu Oakes JP – of Oamaru. For services to mental health and the Pacific community.
- Julie Leslie Paterson – of Auckland. For services to women and sport.
- Leitualaalemalietoa Lynn Lolokini Pavihi – of Auckland. For services to Pacific education.
- Catherine Gabrielle Petrey – of Lower Hutt. For services to the New Zealand Police, arms control and the community.
- Dr David Telfer Robie – of Auckland. For services to journalism and Asia-Pacific media education.
- Dr Louise Gladys Rummel – of Auckland. For services to nursing education.
- Merrick Clifford Sanderson – of Whangārei. For services to orthopaedic surgery.
- Dr Emma Louise Scotter – of Auckland. For services to motor neuron disease research.
- Rachel Jane Smalley – of Auckland. For services to broadcasting and health advocacy.
- Akinihi Miraka Smith – of Kaitaia. For services to Māori and the Anglican Church.
- Graham Frederick Smith – of Waitara. For services to horticulture.
- Orquidea Nallely Gabriela Tamayo Mortera – of Auckland. For services to diversional and recreational therapy and education.
- Amohaere Judith Tangitu – of Whakatāne. For services to Māori health.
- Glenn Lindsay Teal – of Auckland. For services to Fire and Emergency New Zealand and the community.
- Allison Jane Todd – of Wellington. For services to equestrian coaching and water safety.
- Kristine Ellen Tynan – of Christchurch. For services to people with long-term conditions and older adults.
- Jocelyn Isobel Urbahn – of Foxton. For services to surf lifesaving and squash.
- Sally Ann Walker – of Whangaparāoa. For services to health advocacy.
- Detective Inspector Lewis Robert Warner – of Tauranga. For services to the New Zealand Police and the community.
- Lisa Anne Whittle – of Wellington. For services to wildlife conservation.
- Adine Rachel Wilson – of Auckland. For services to netball.
- Nicola Jane Wilson – of Auckland. For services to mental health advocacy, particularly disordered eating.
- Abann Kamyay Ajak Yor – of Auckland. For services to ethnic and migrant communities.

Honorary

- Allyn (Aliya) Sue Danzeisen – of Hamilton. For services to the Muslim community and women.
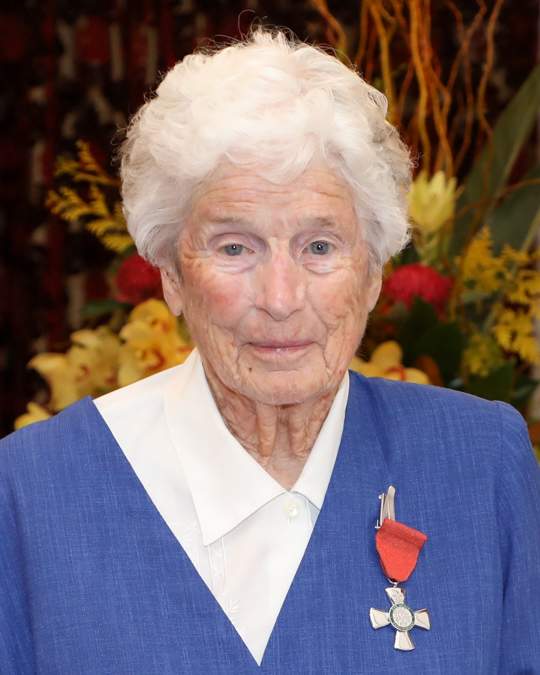
Jenny Banfield

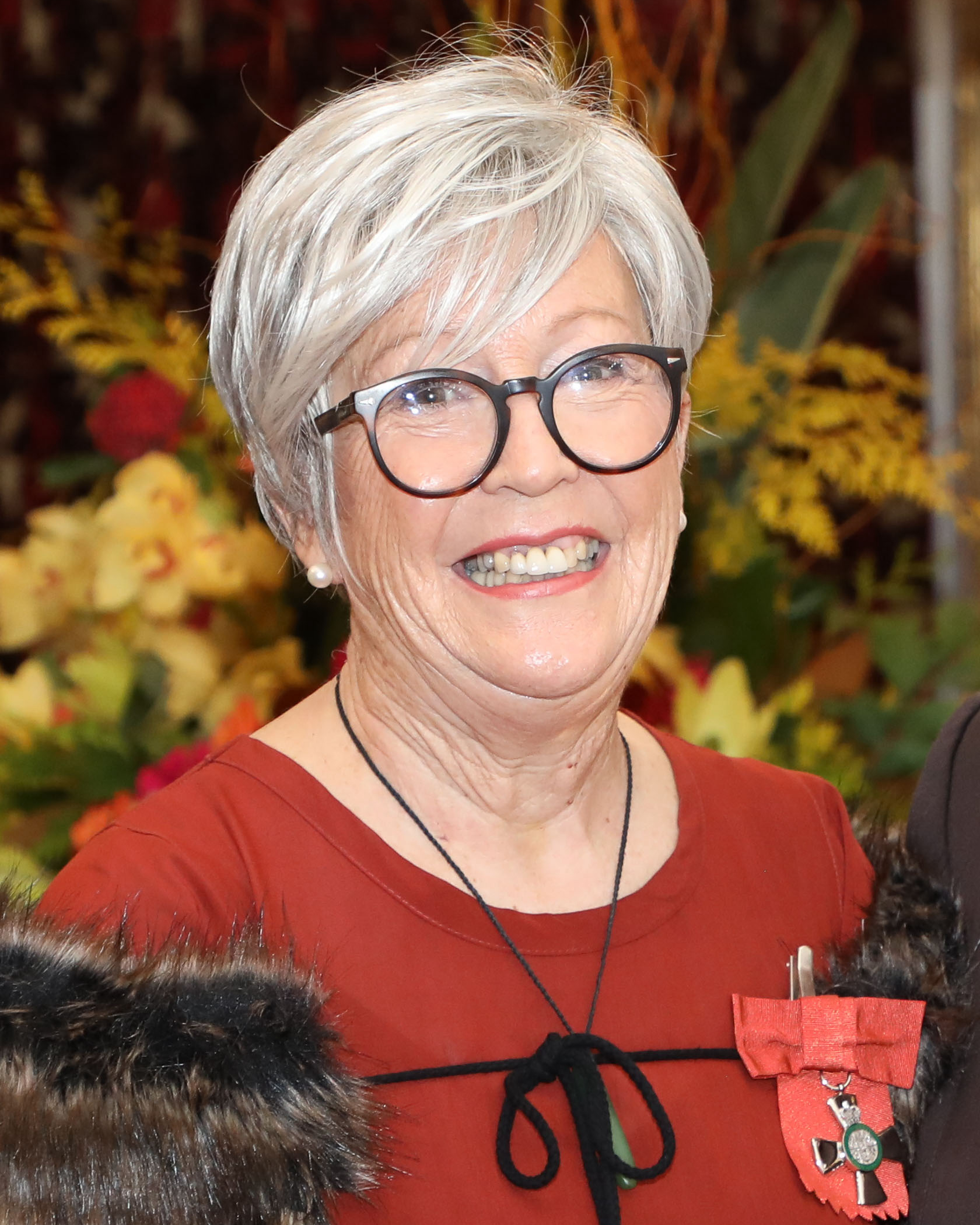
Karen Bartlett

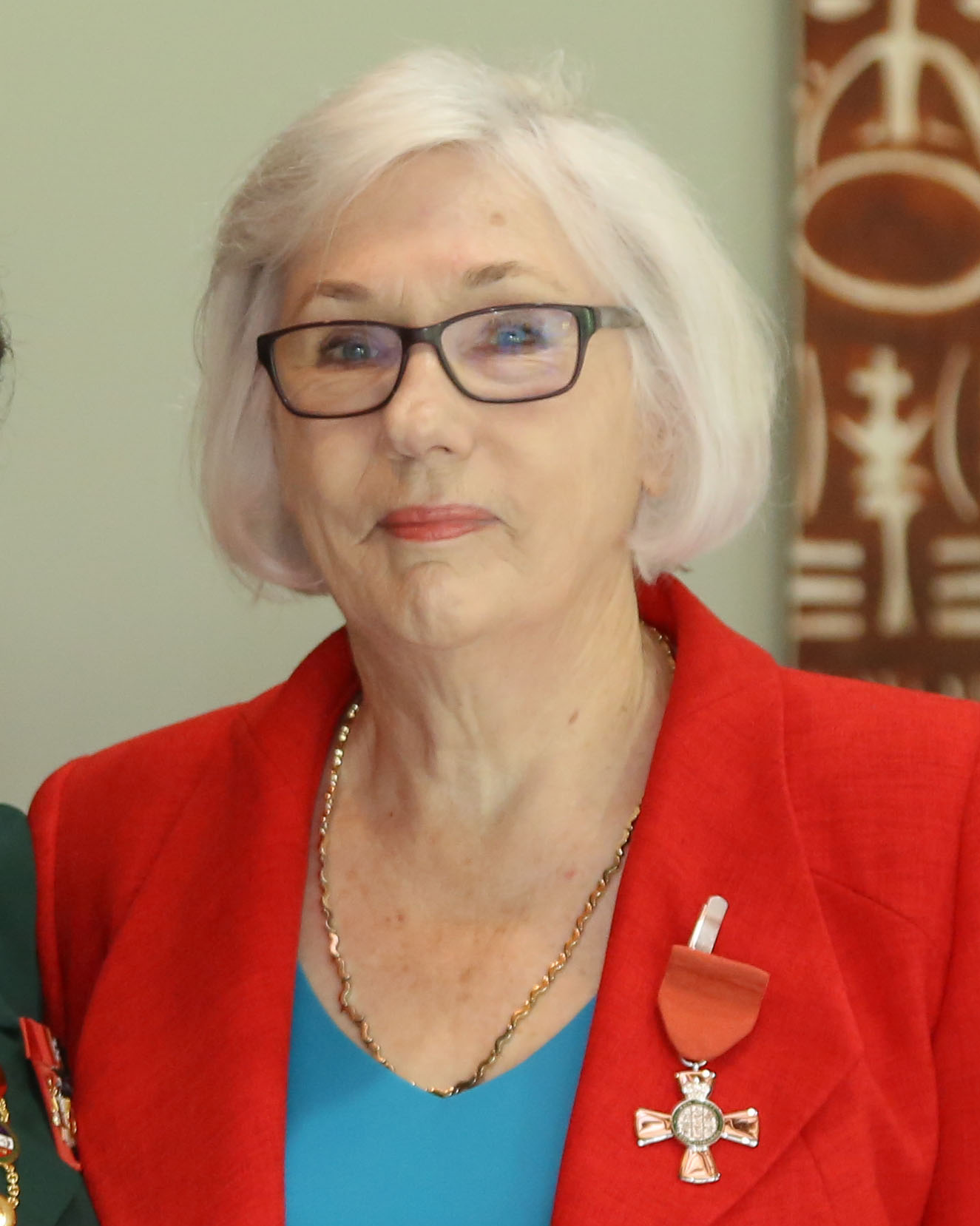
Suzanne Blackwell

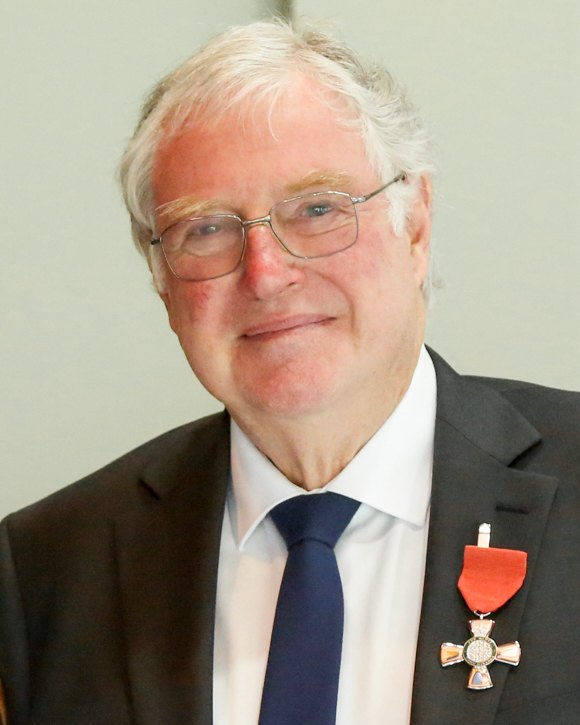
Barry Brown

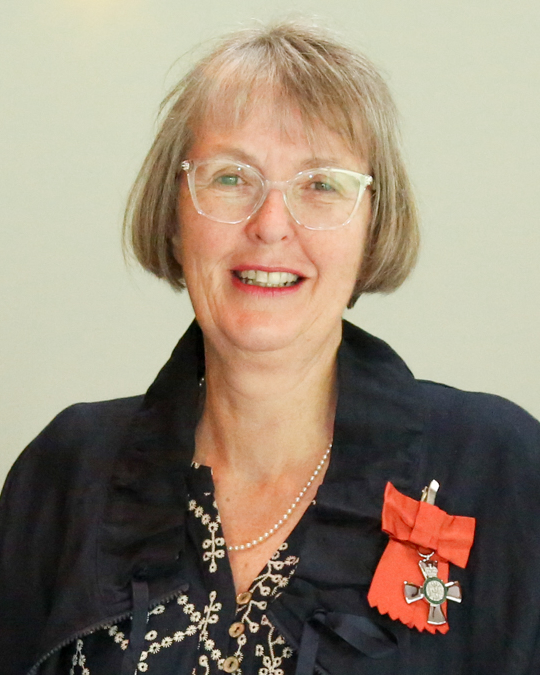
Jane Cartwright

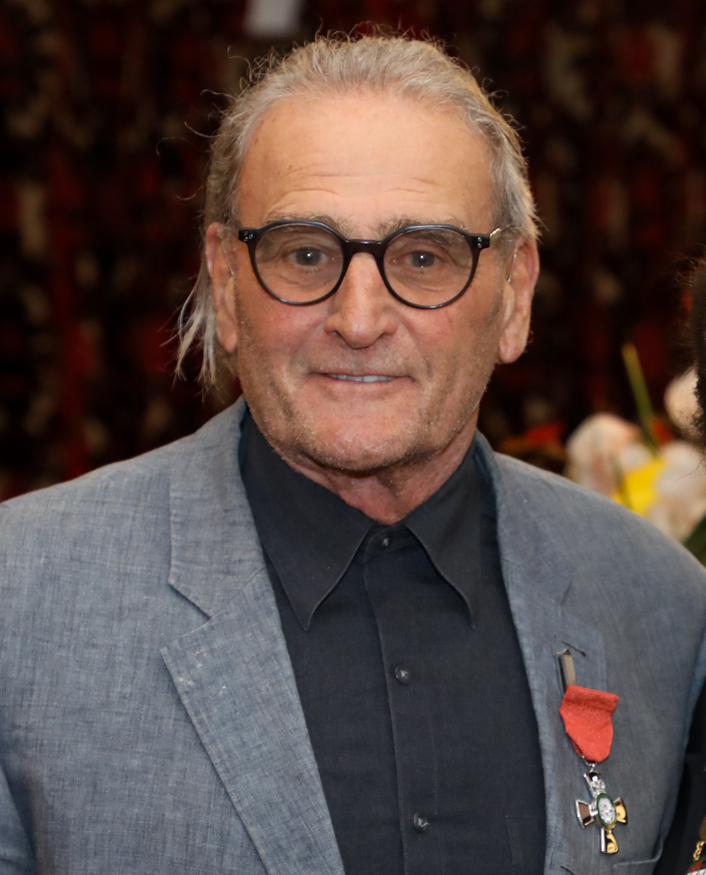
Philip Chapman

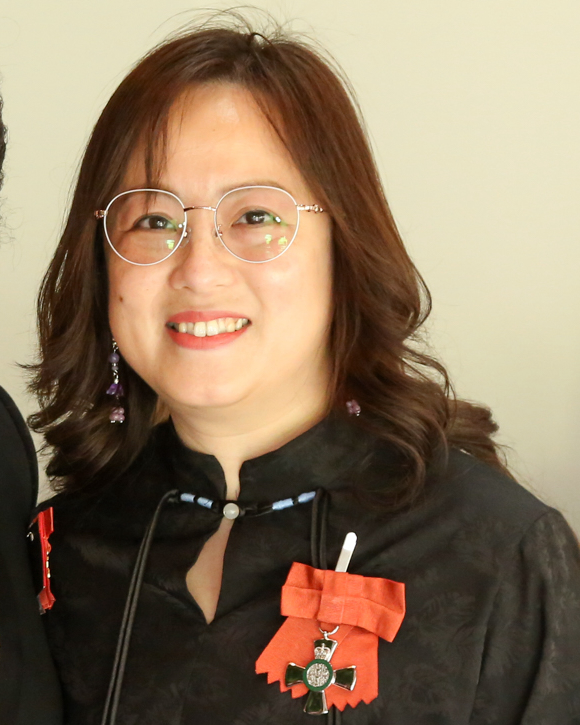
Eva Chen

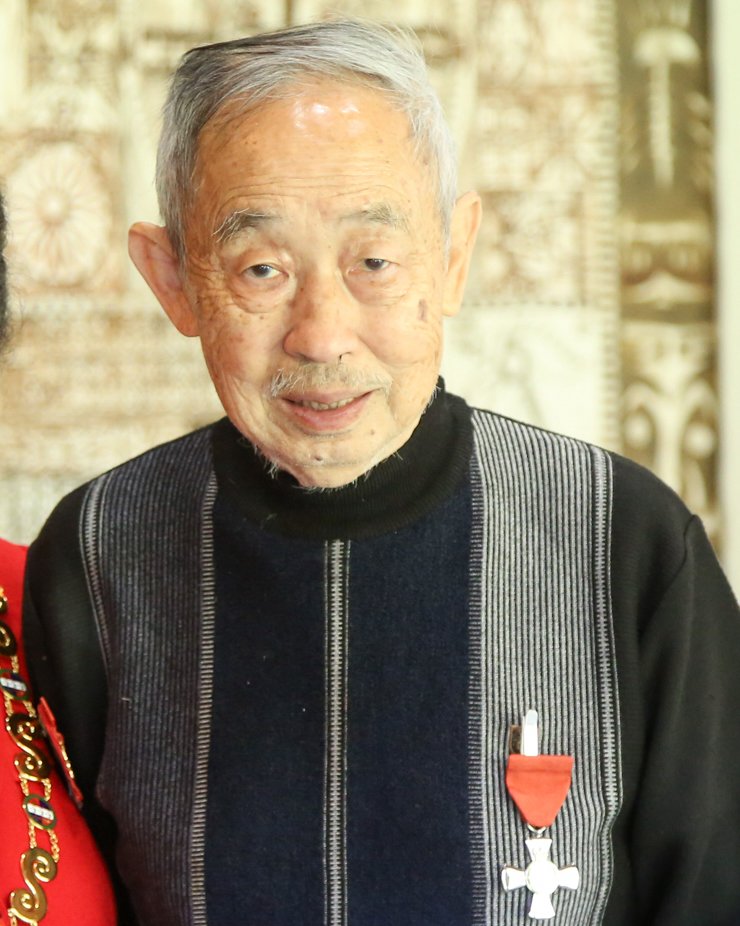
Phillip Lam

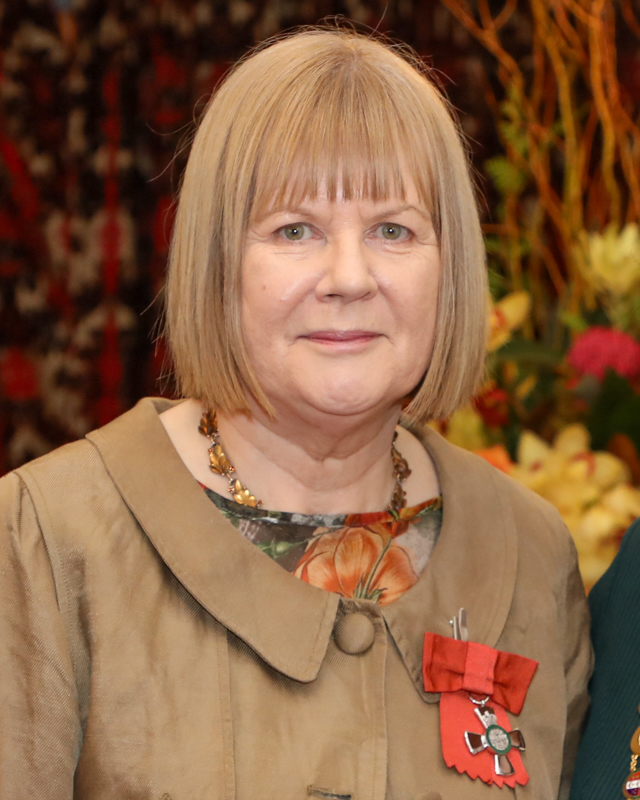
Chris Clark

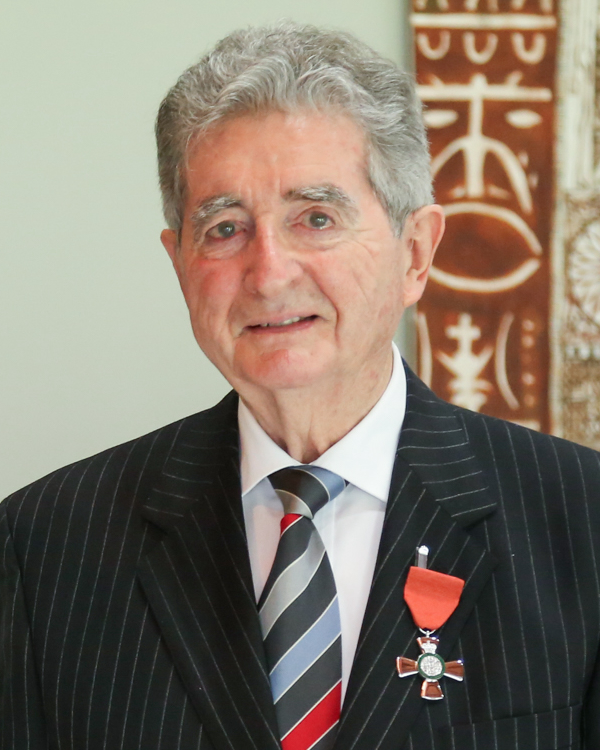
John Collins

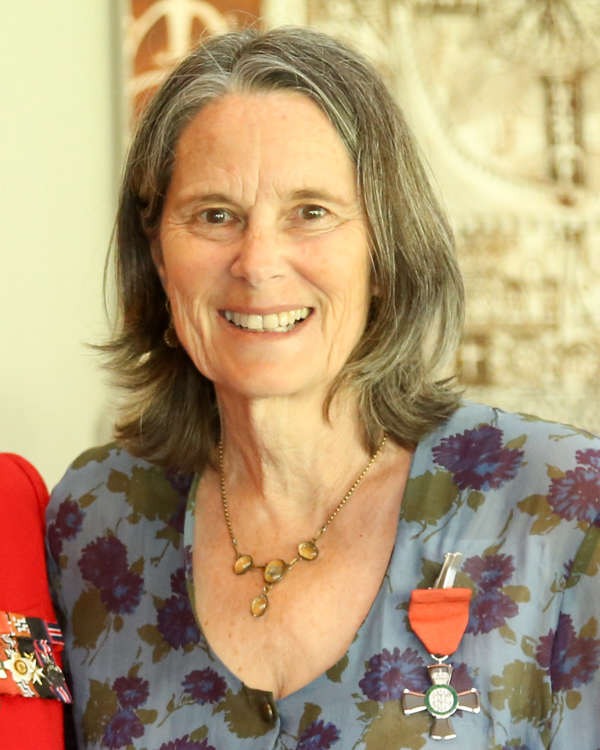
Fleur Corbett

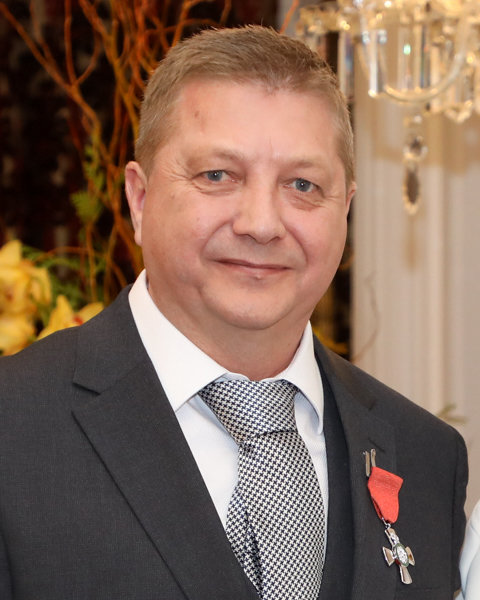
Thomas Coyle

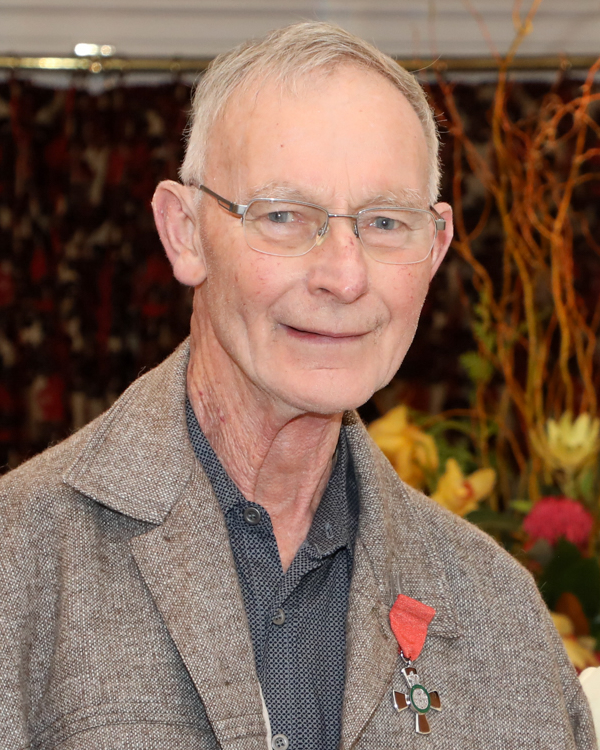
Mark Crompton

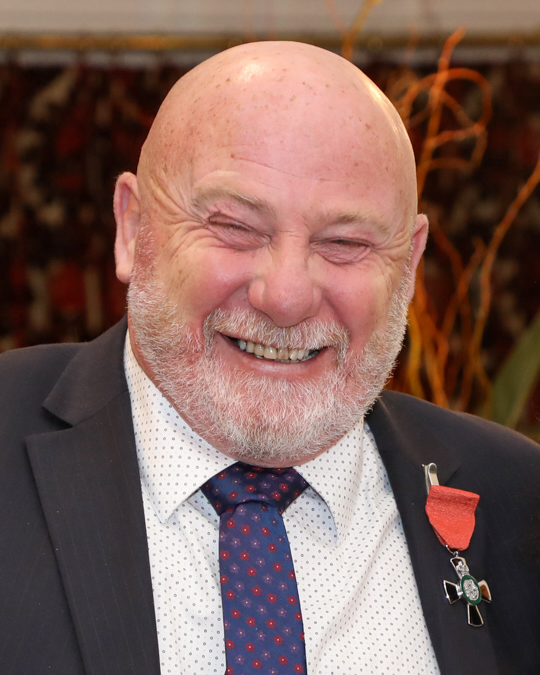
Niall Deehan

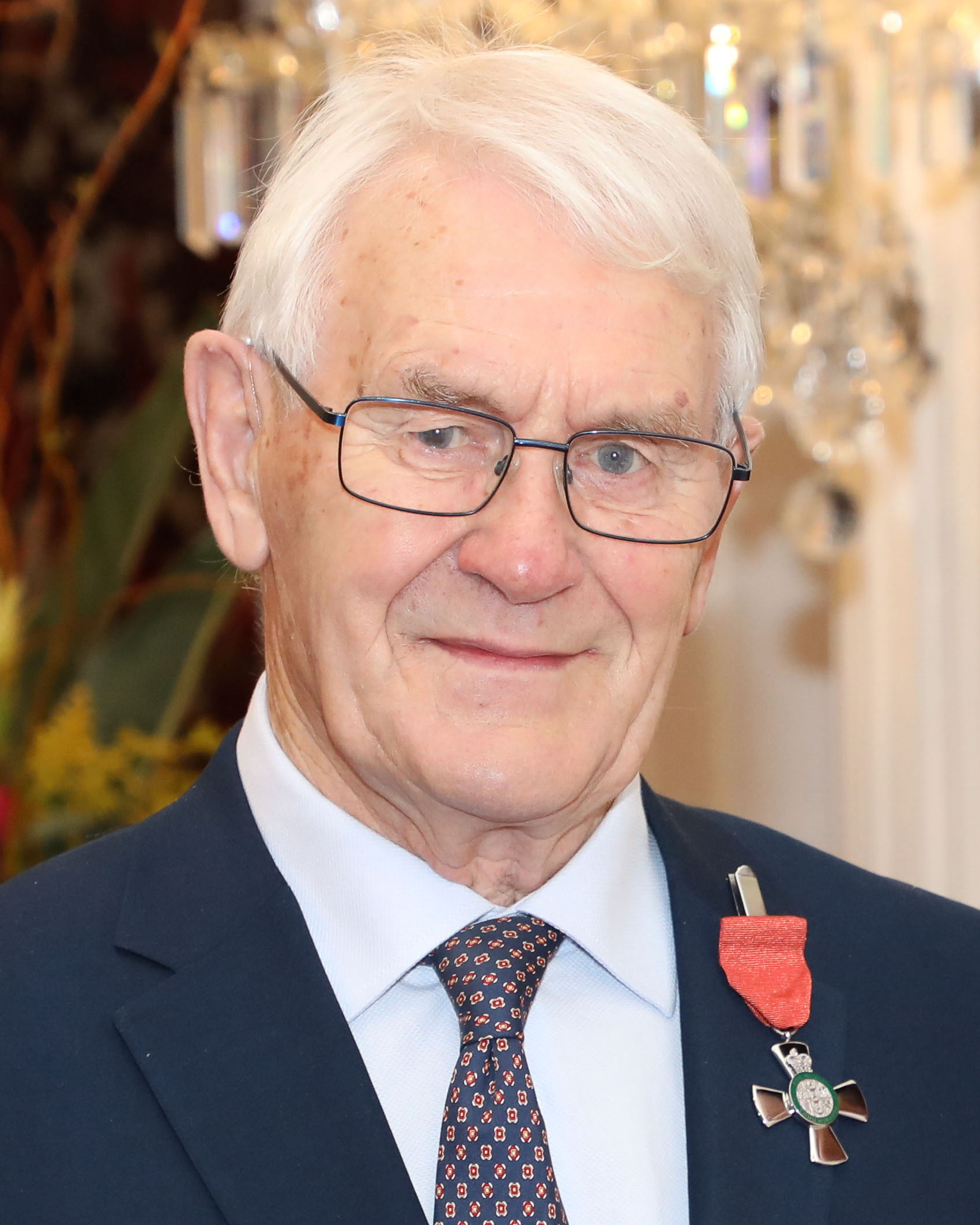
Anthony Dreaver

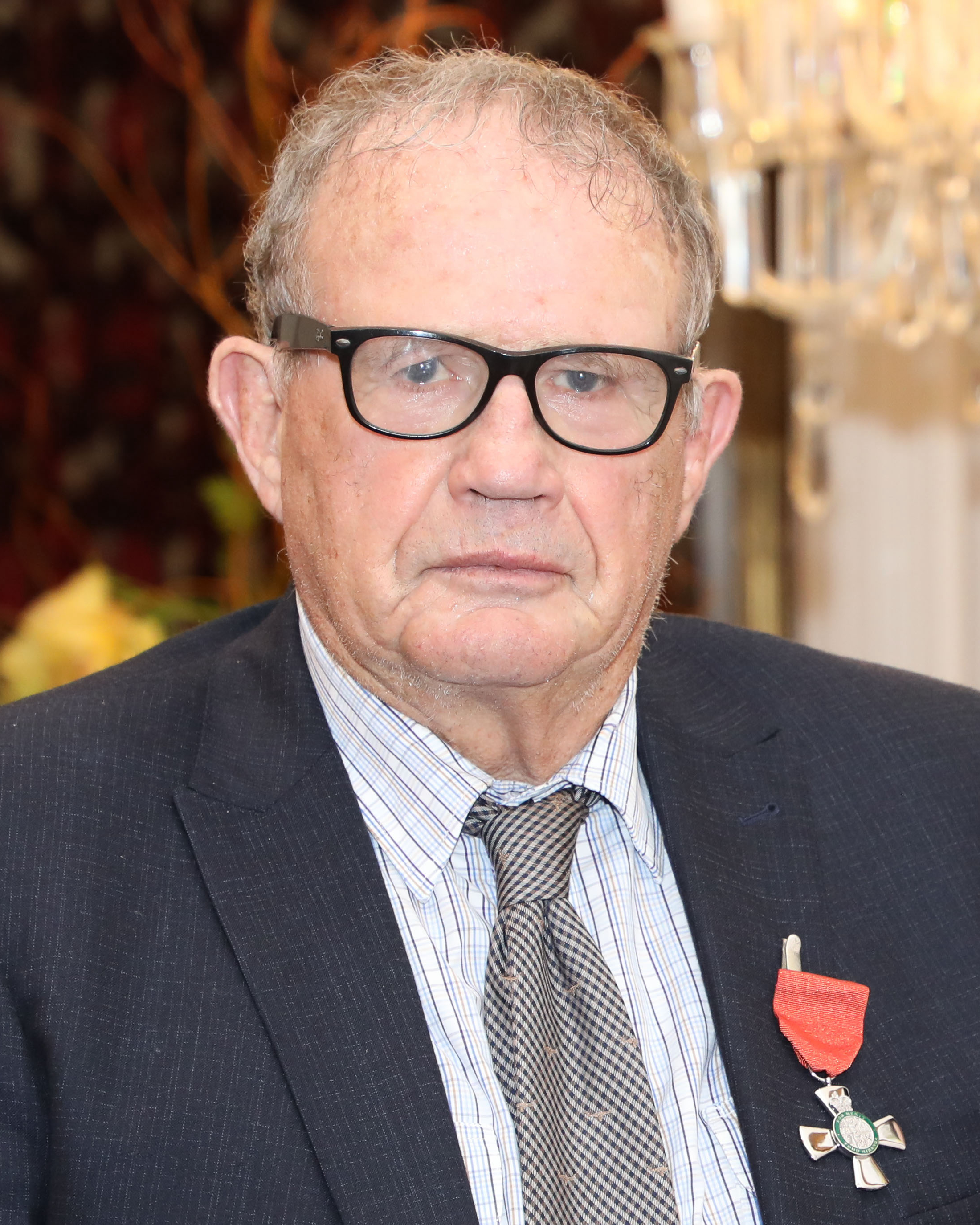
Reid Fletcher

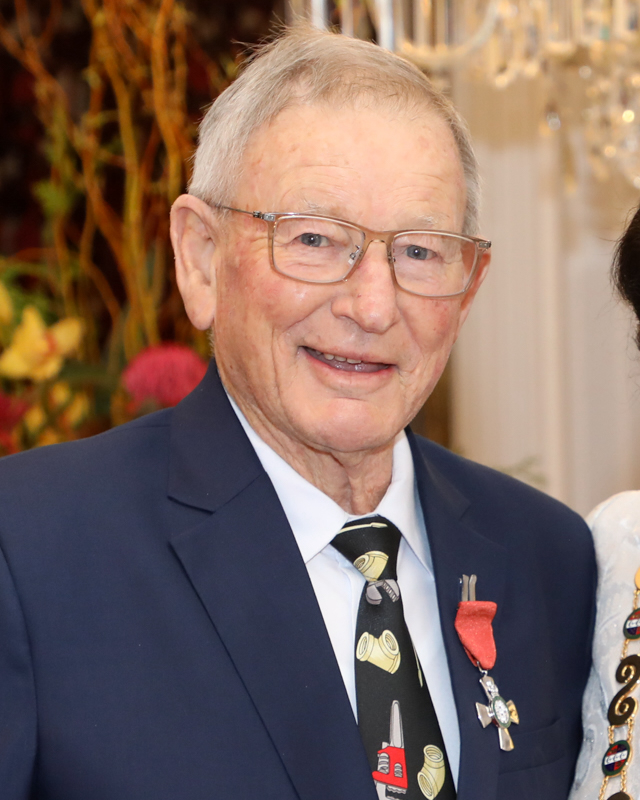
Brian Foley

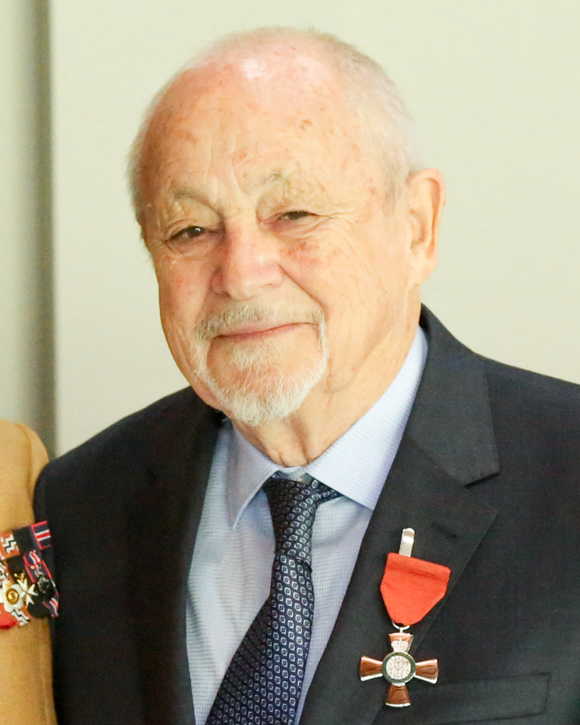
Keith Gordon

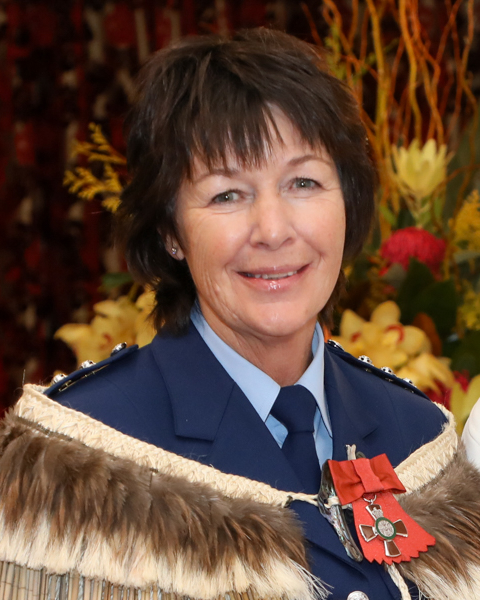
Freda Grace

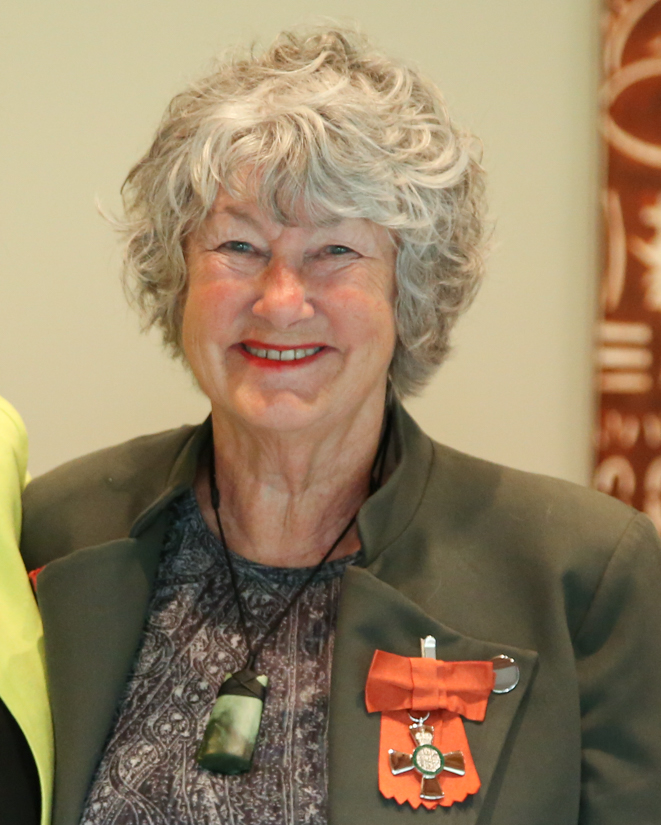
Liz Greive

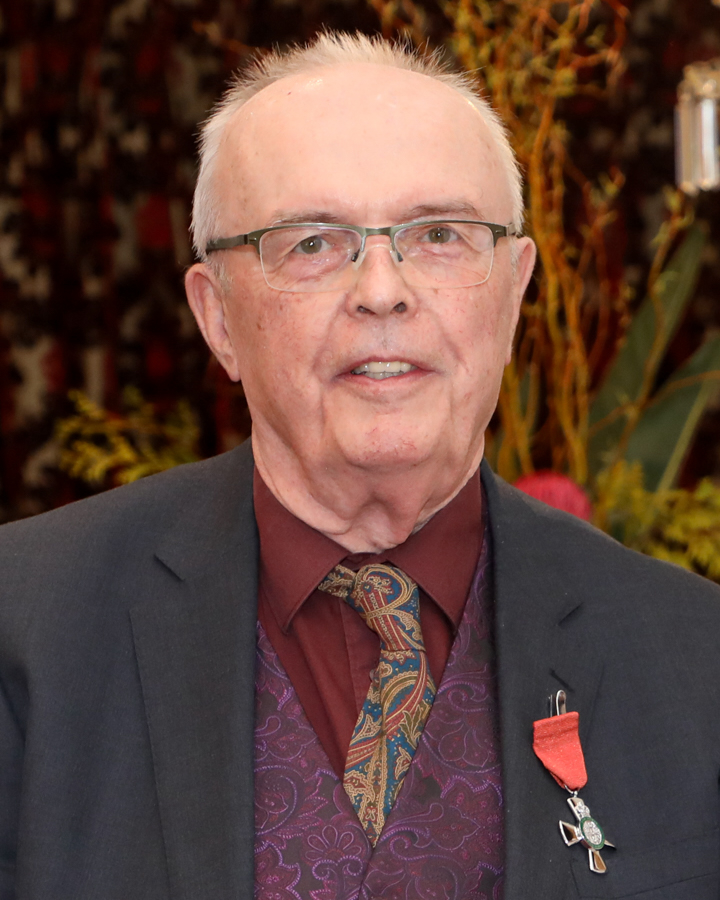
Warner Haldane

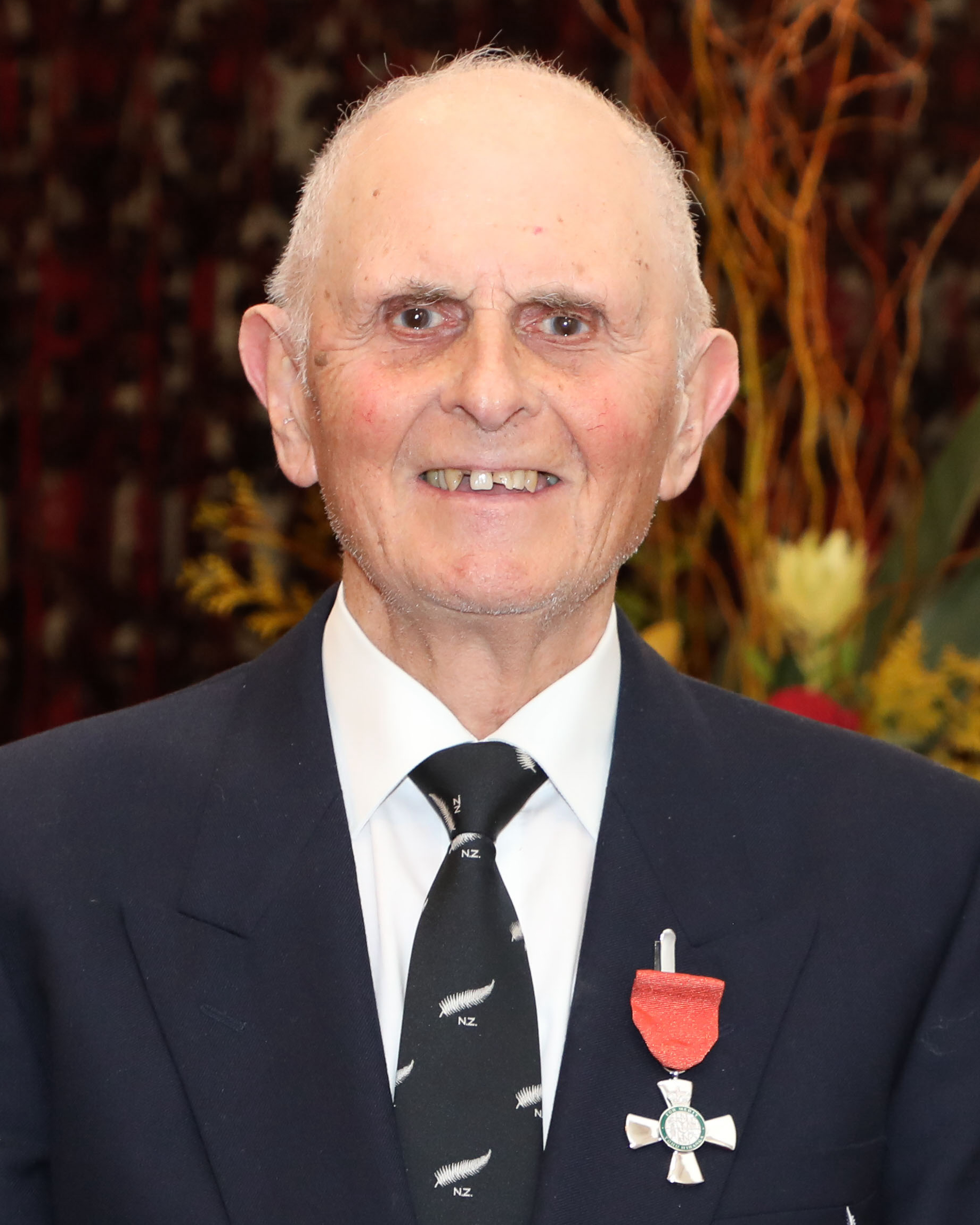
Dave Henshaw

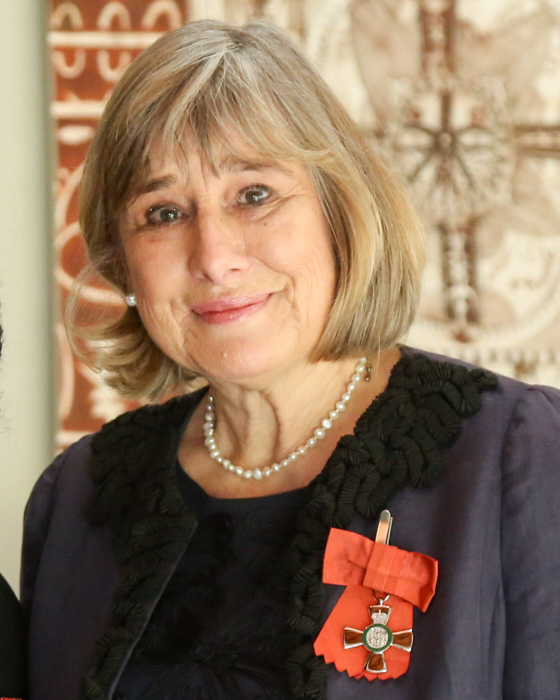
Barbara Hochstein

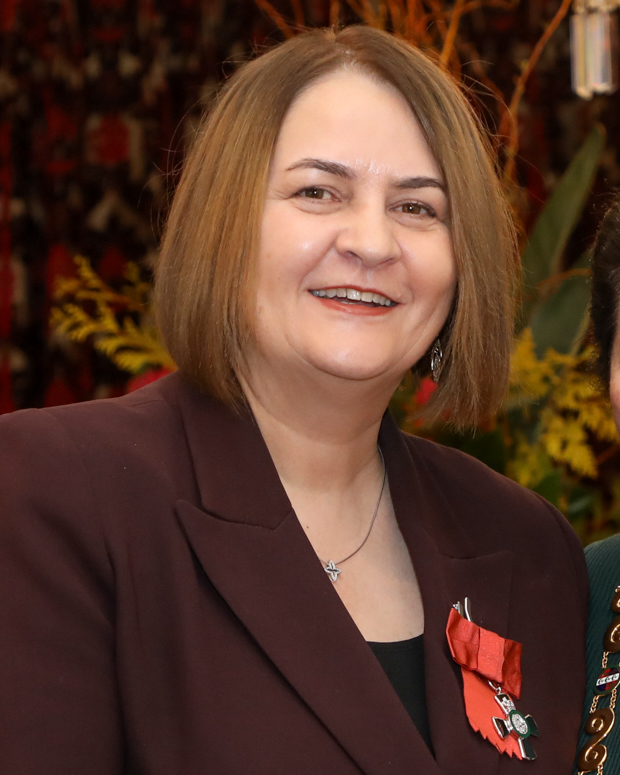
Jolie Hodson

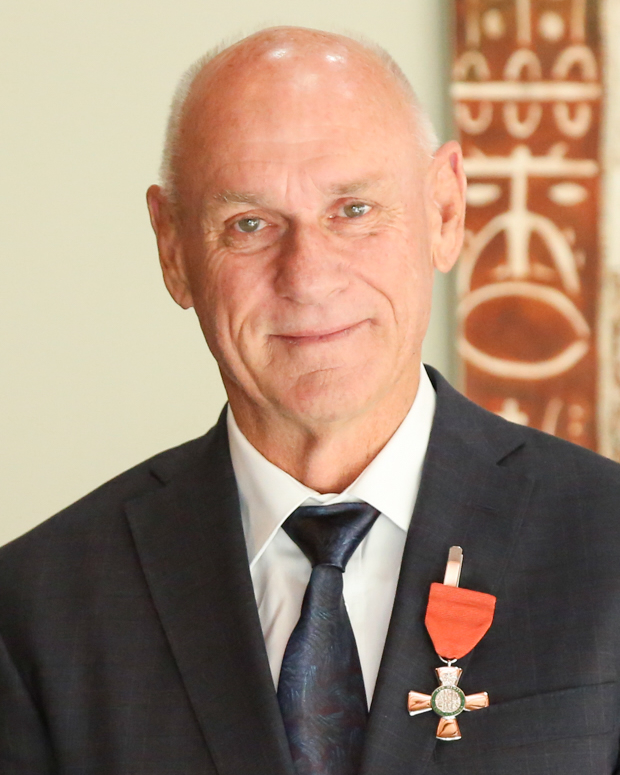
Leigh Hopper

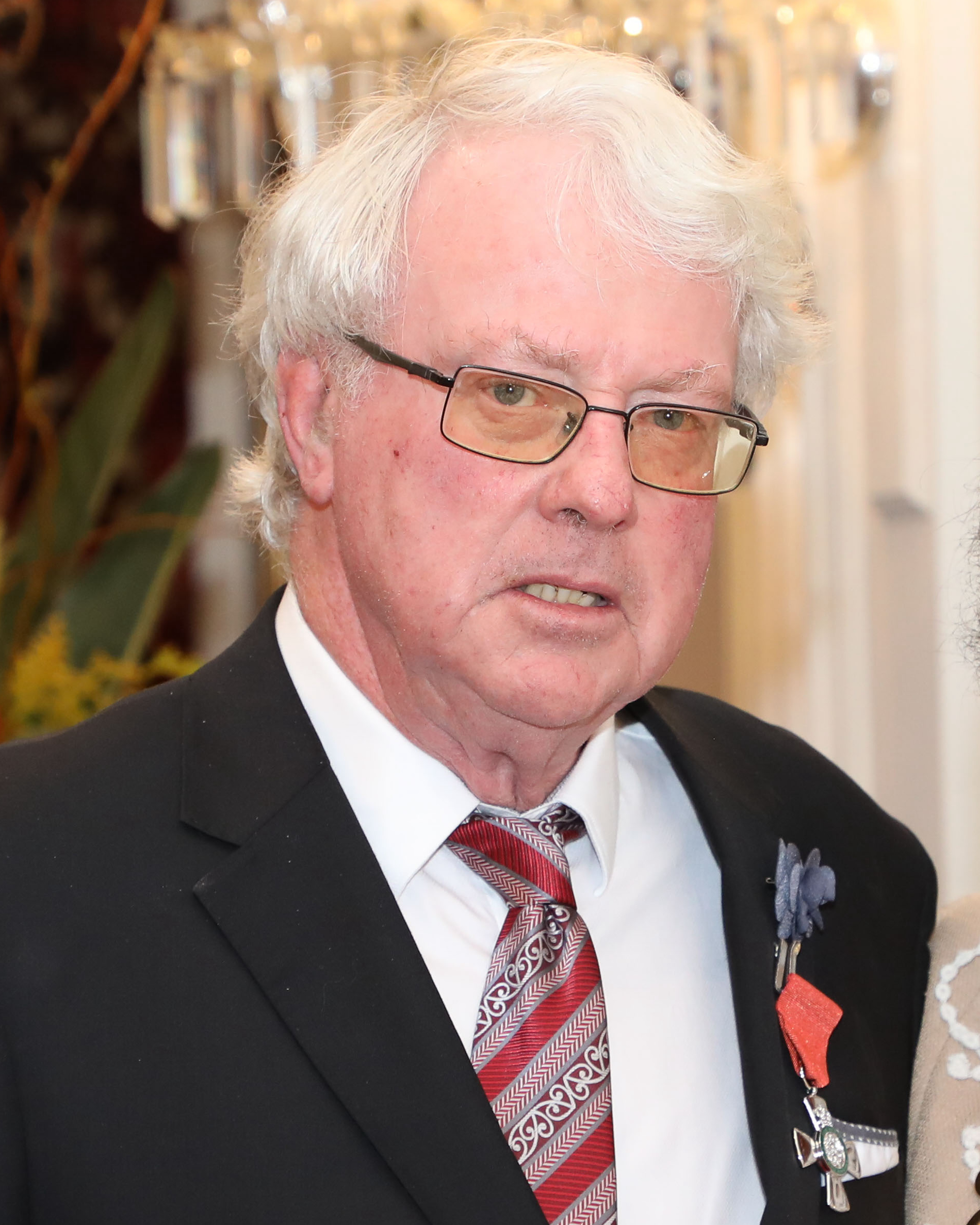
Kerry Hudson

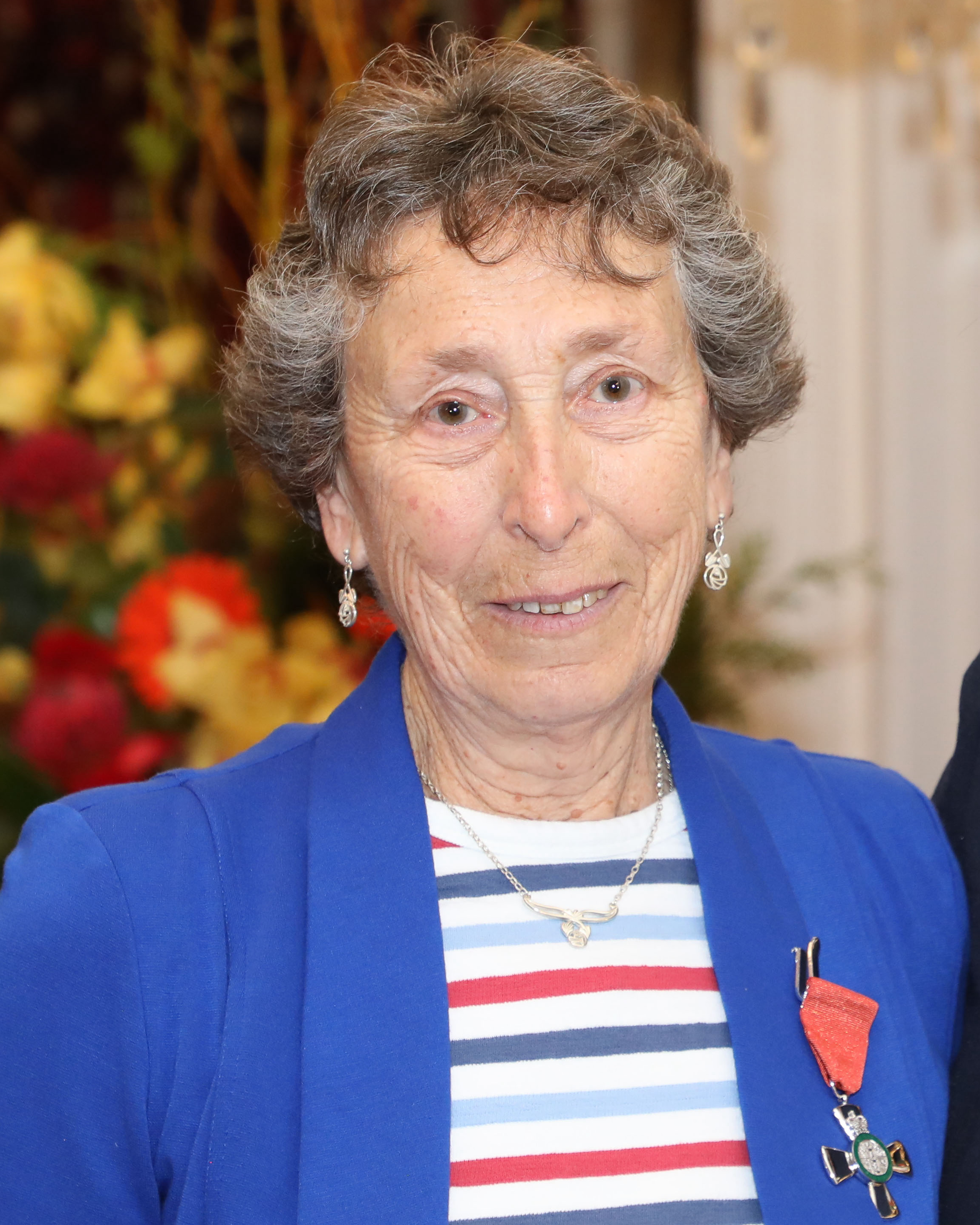
Dianne John

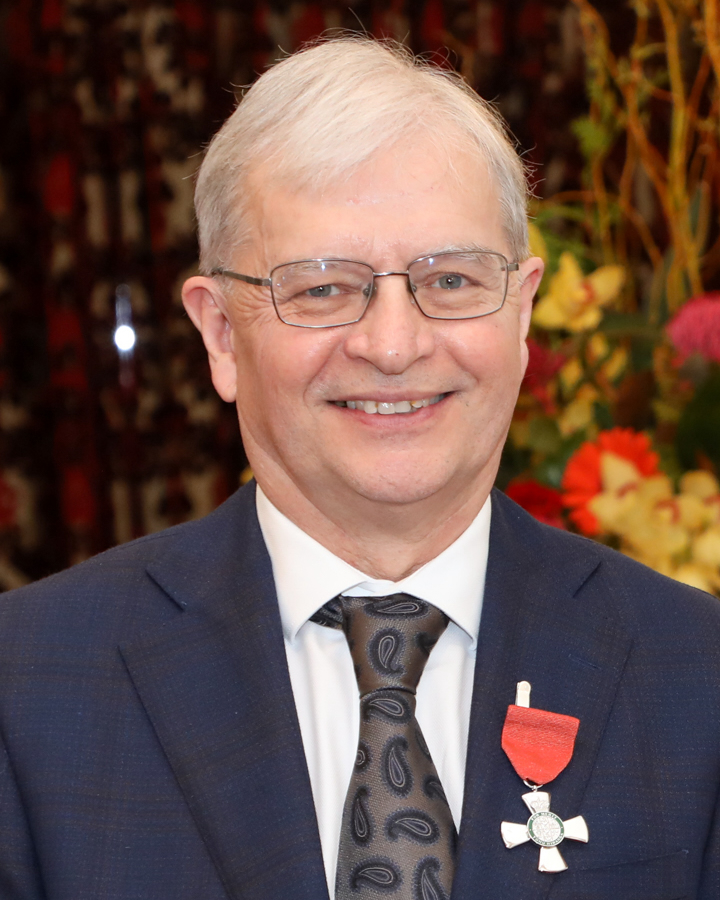
Keith Jones

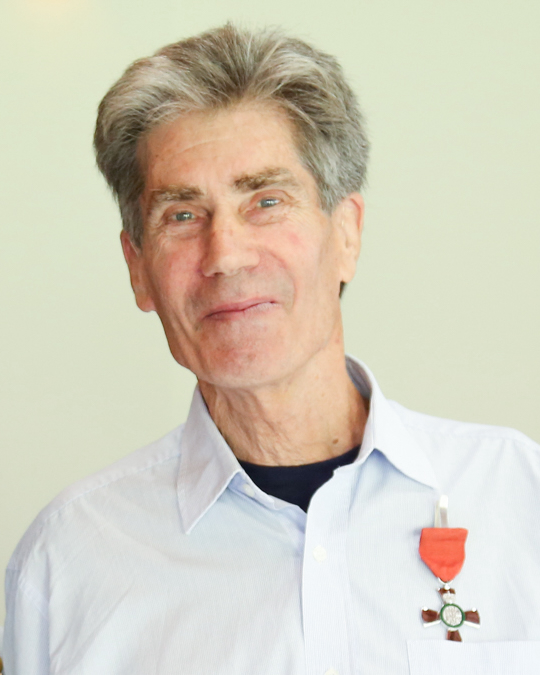
Stephen Kafka

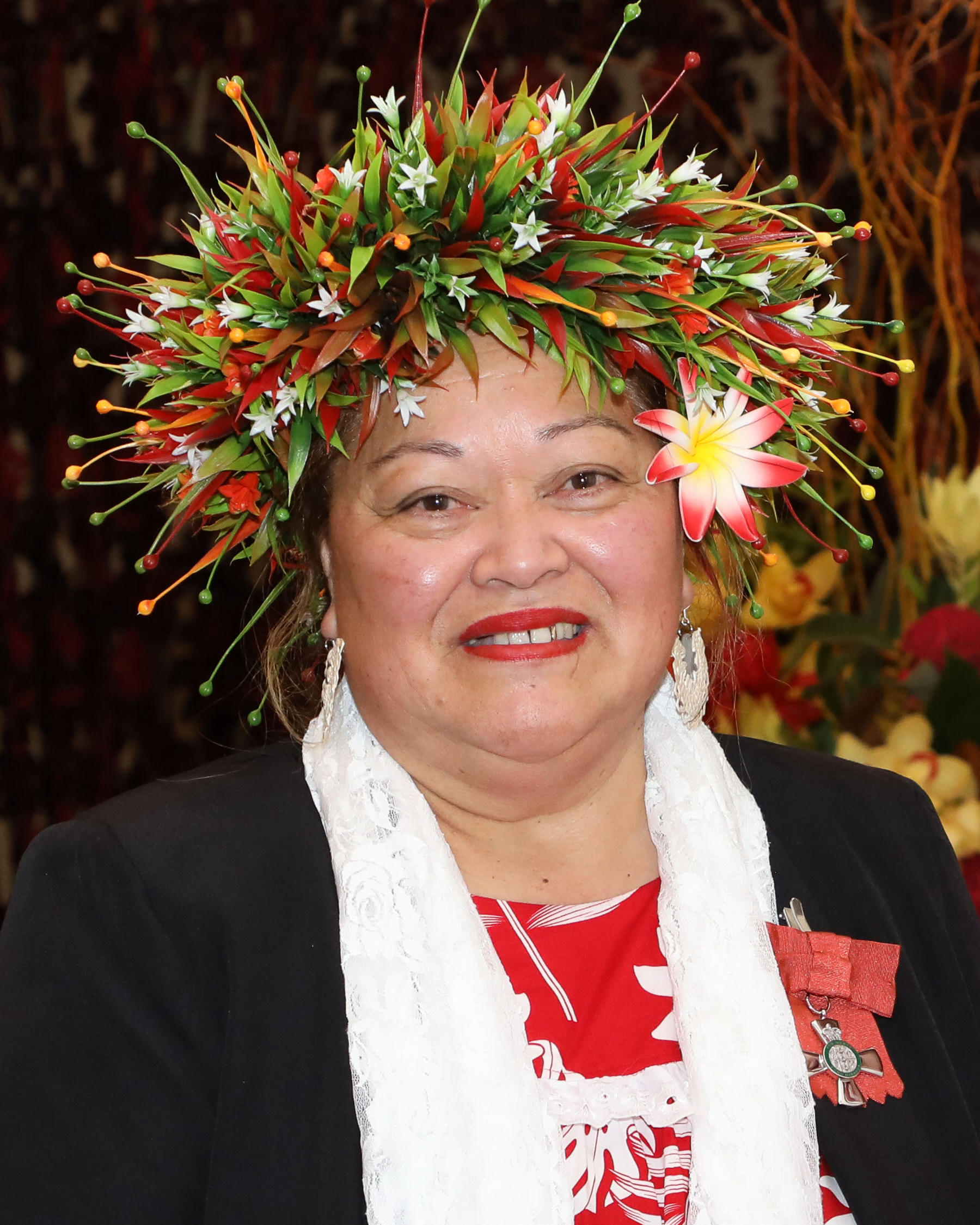
Bridget Kauraka

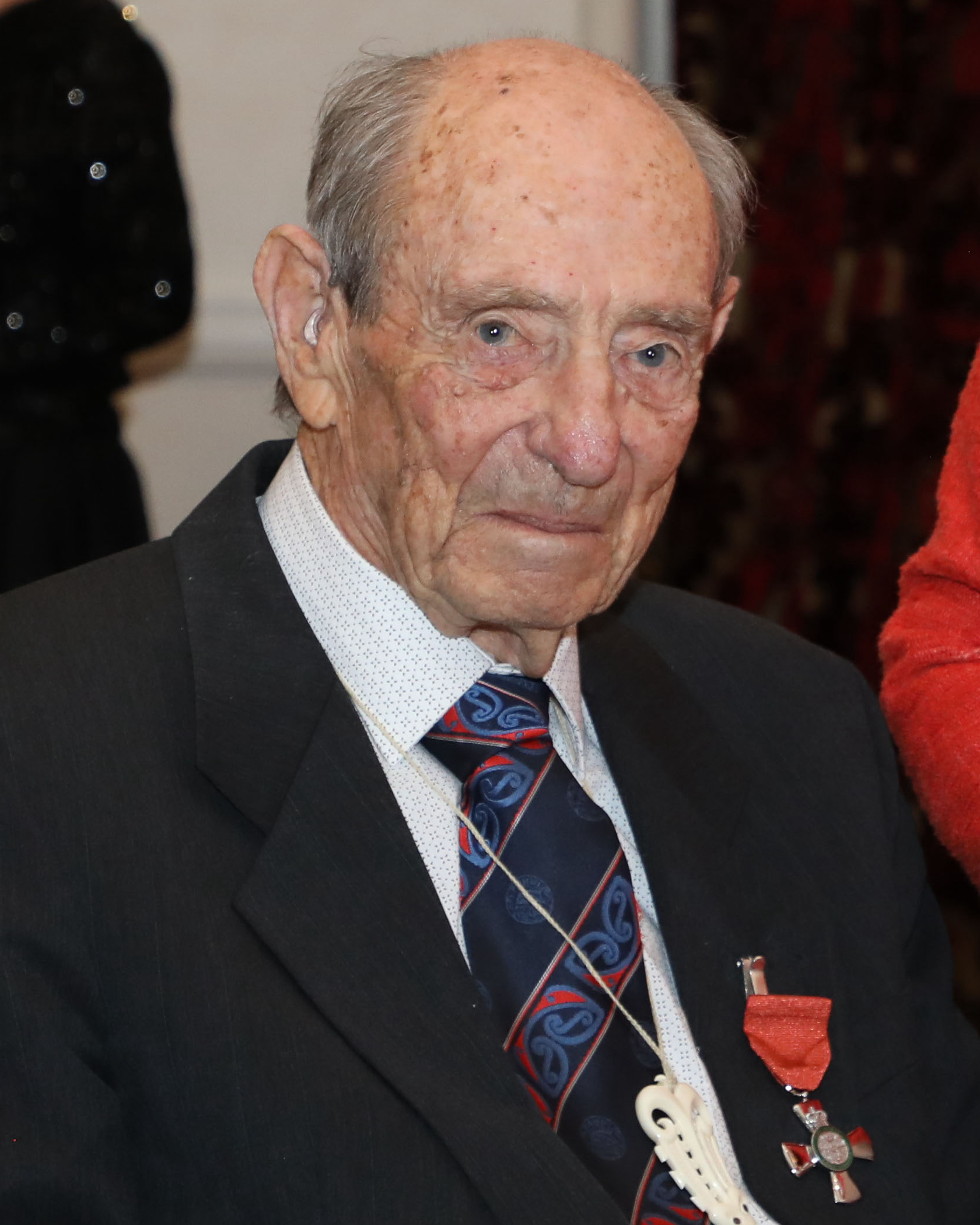
Rex Kerr

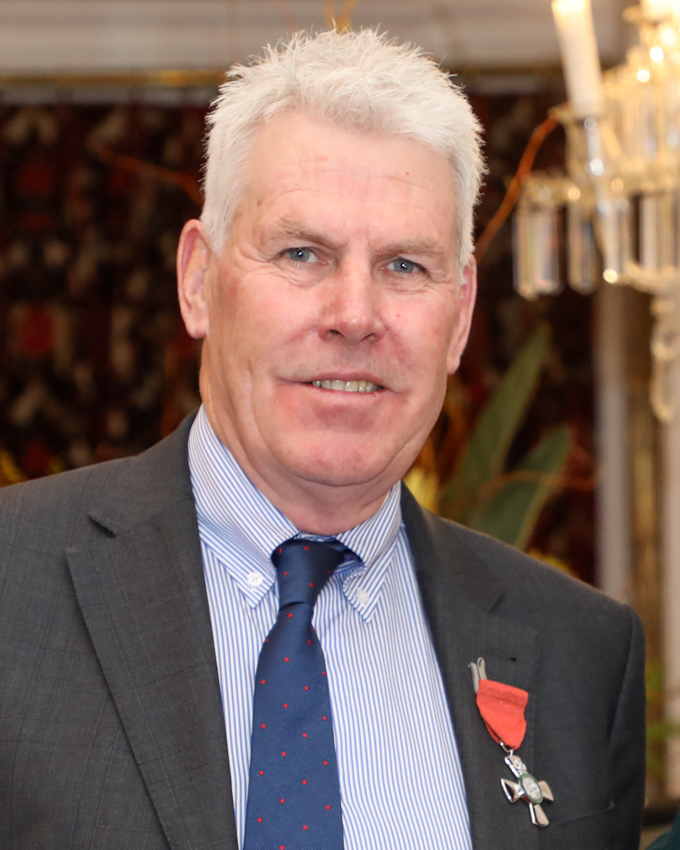
Murray King

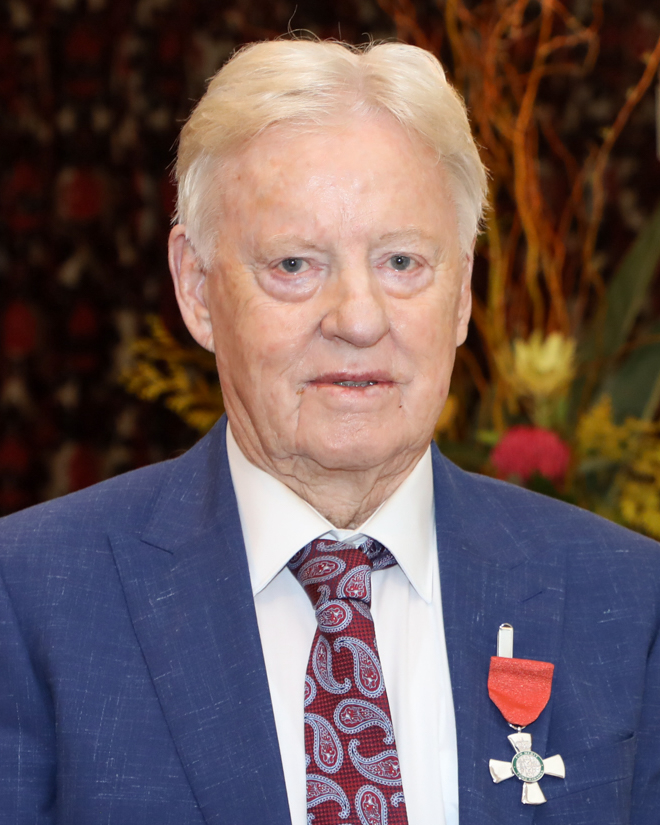
Fred Lewis

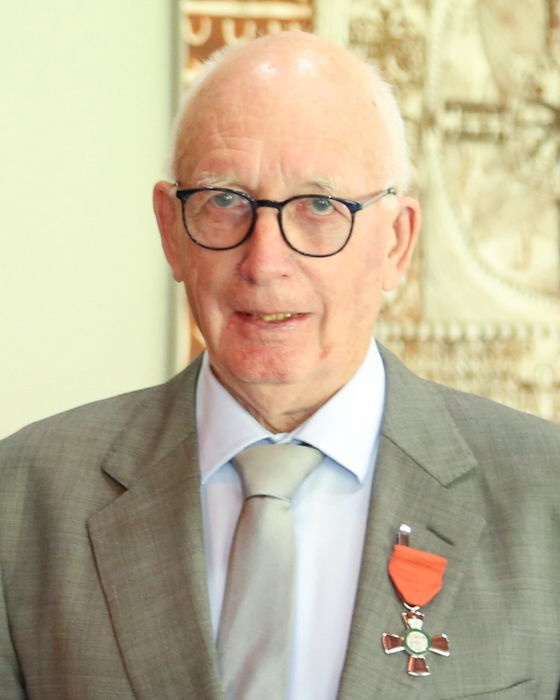
Sam Lewis

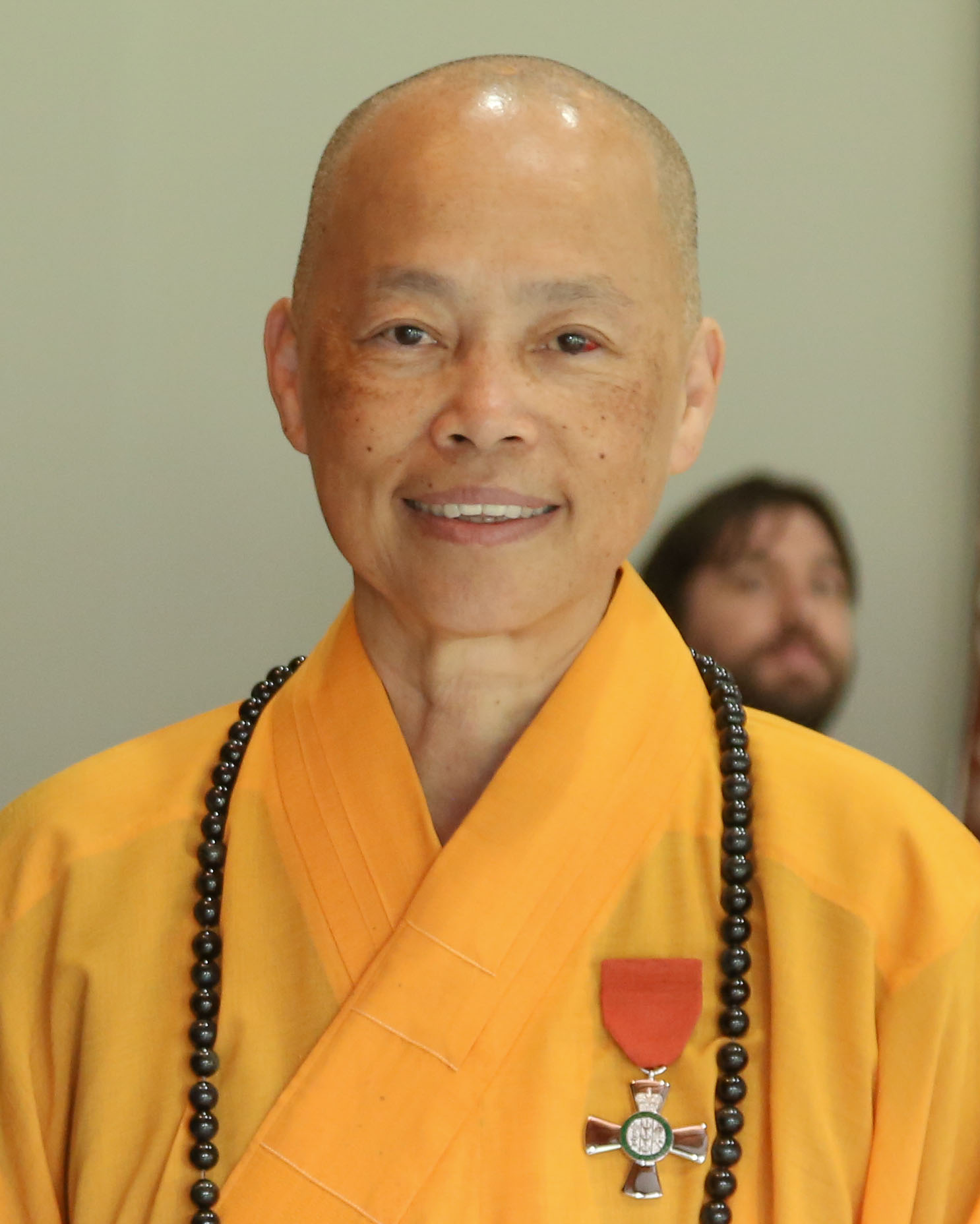
Abbess Manshin

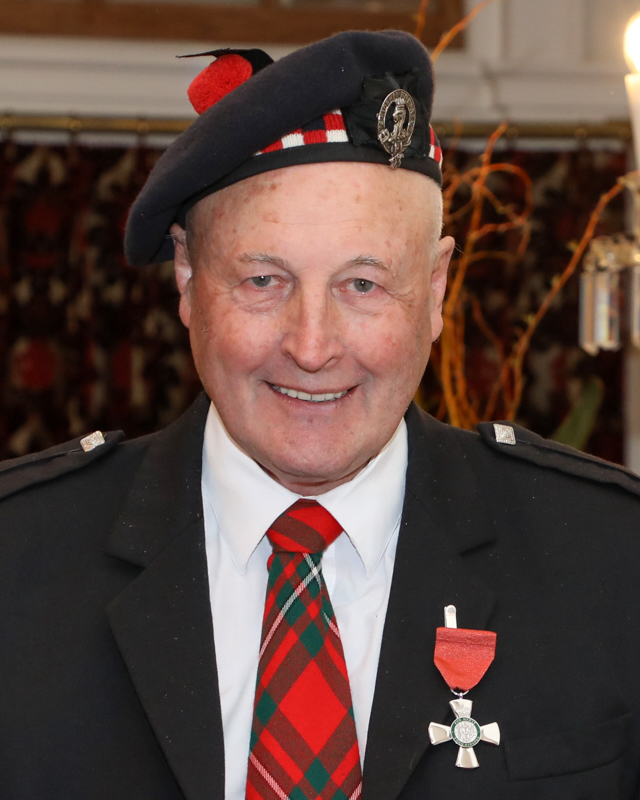
Allister Macgregor

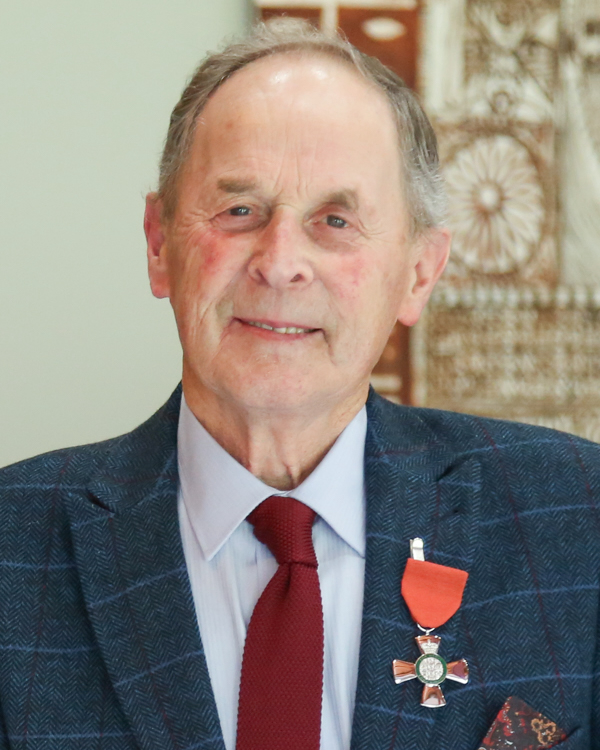
Allen McCaw

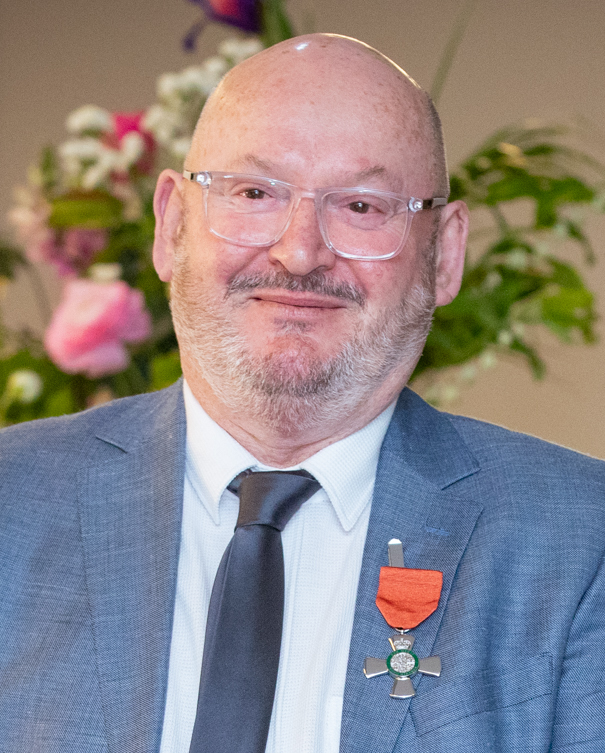
John McKenzie

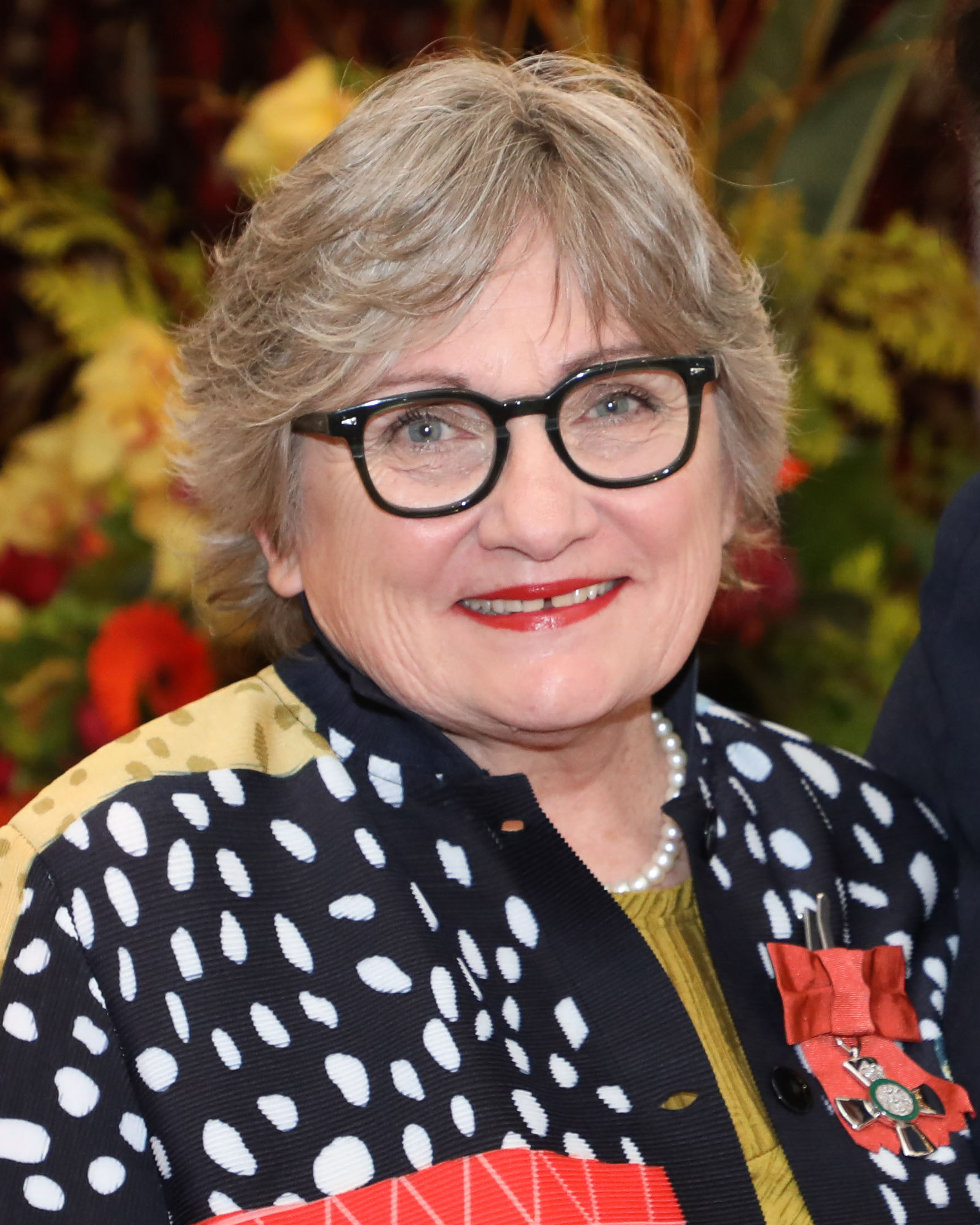
Lorraine Mentz

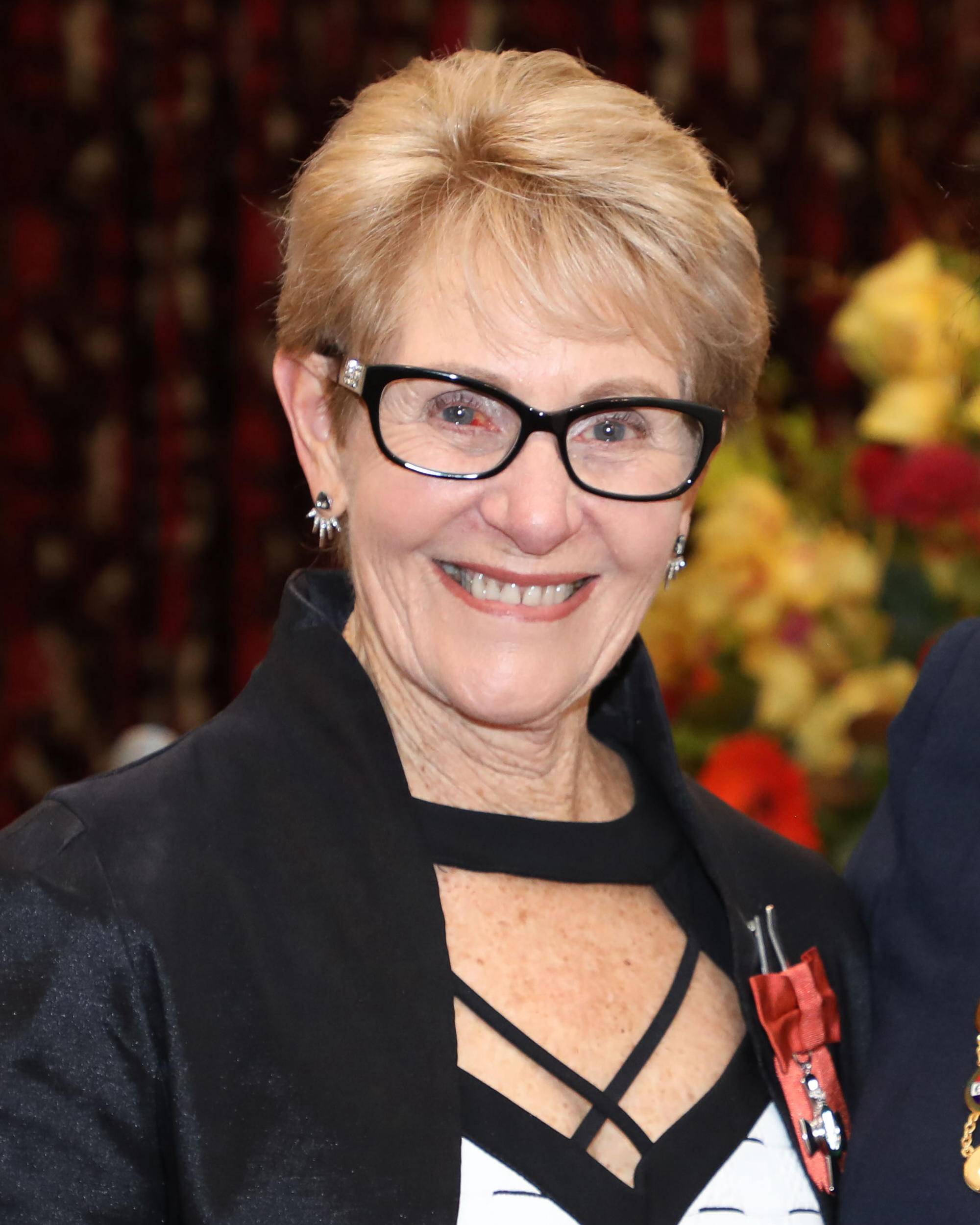
Maureen Morris

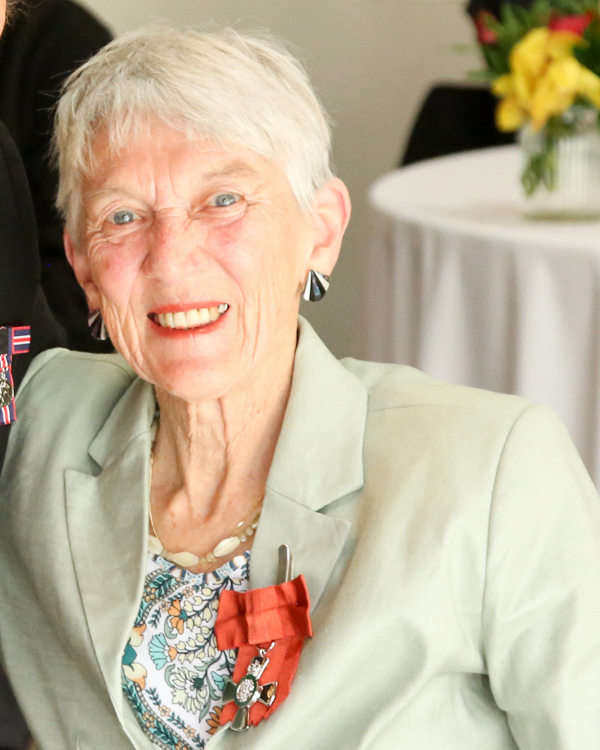
Vivian Naylor

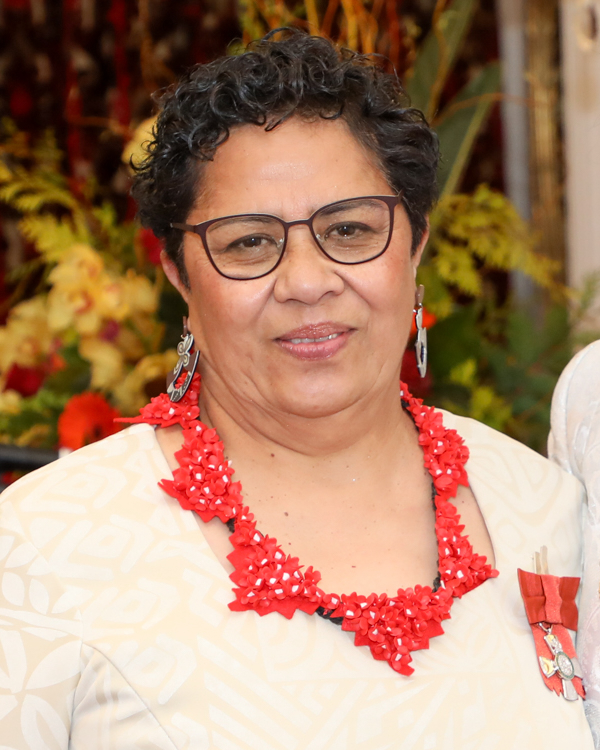
Frances Oakes

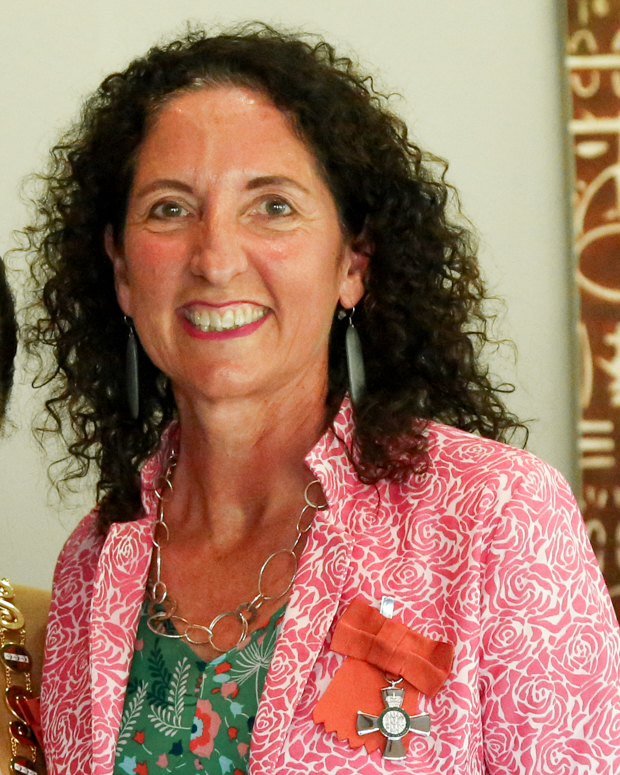
Julie Paterson

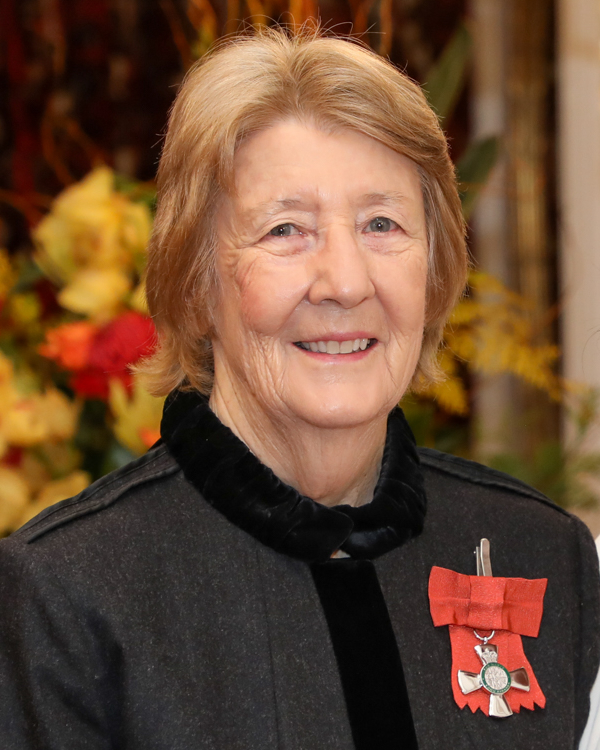
Catherine Petrey

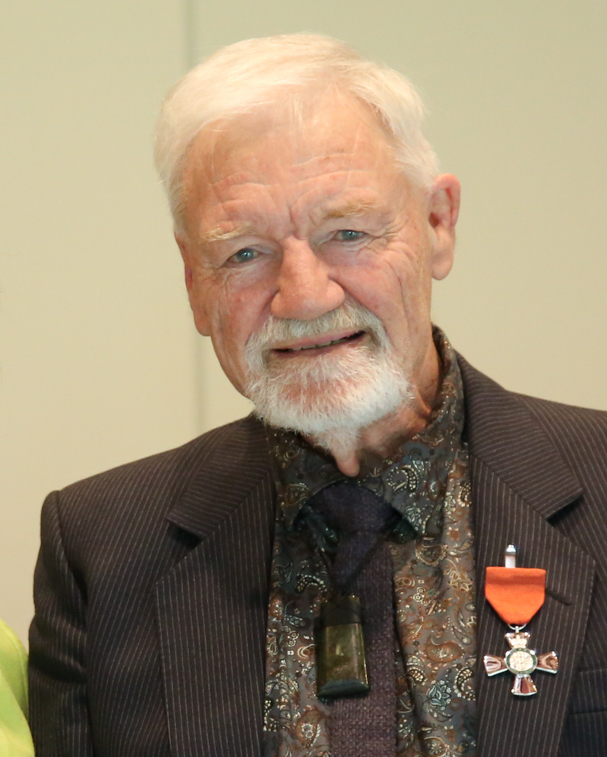
David Robie

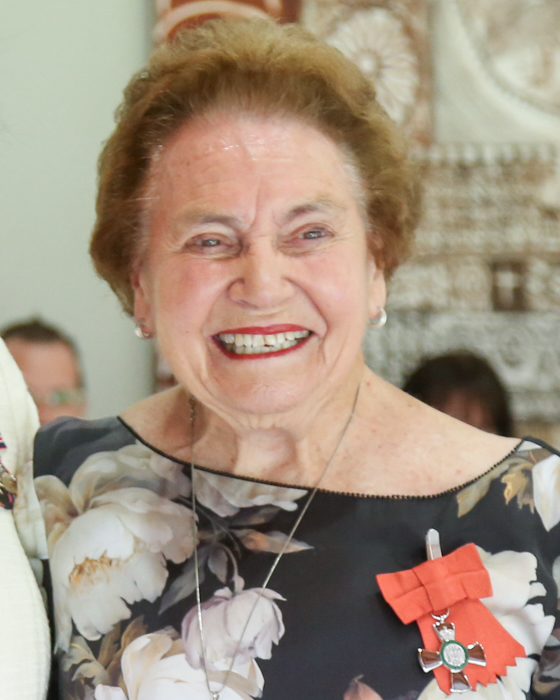
Louise Rummel

Merrick Sanderson

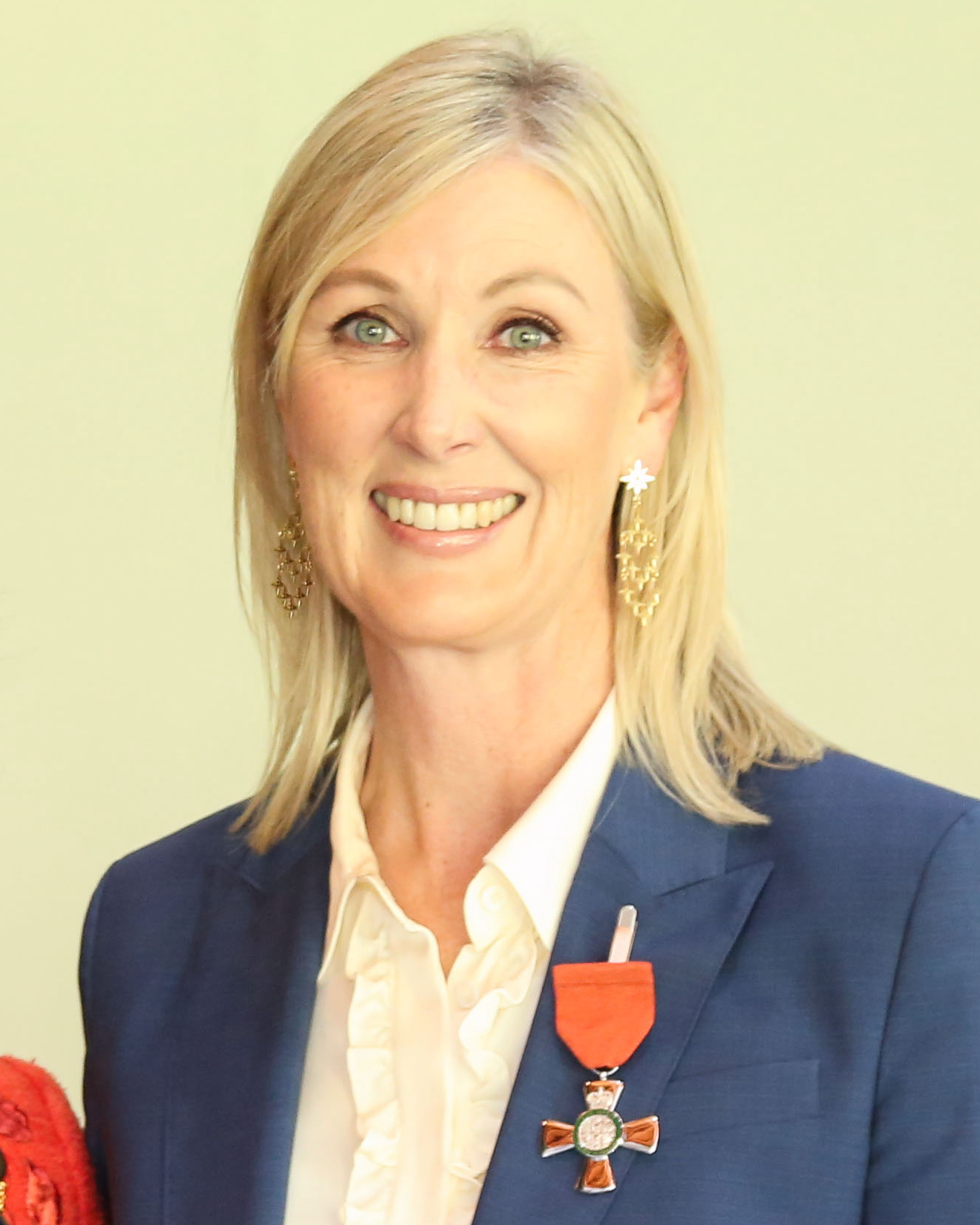
Rachel Smalley

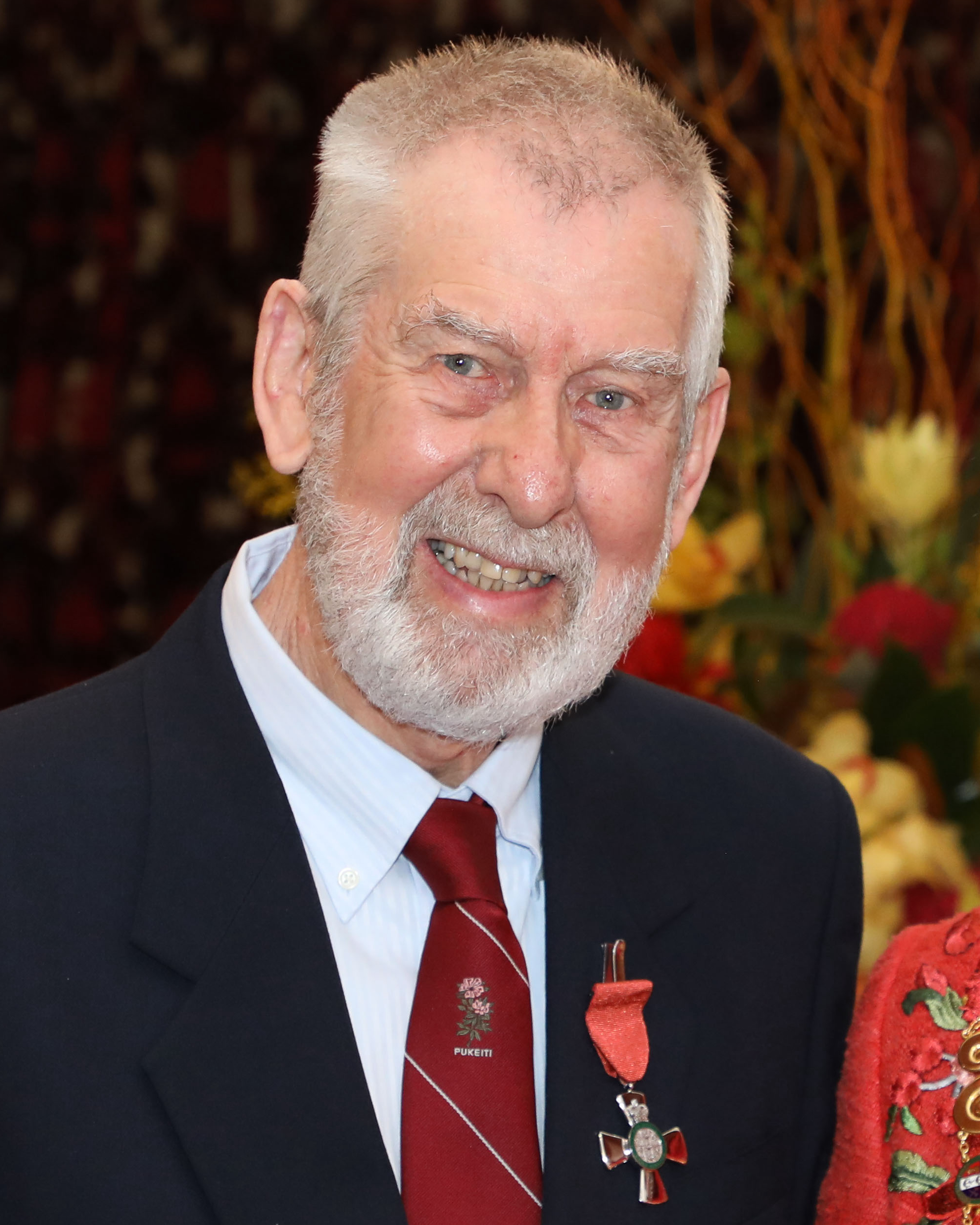
Graham Smith

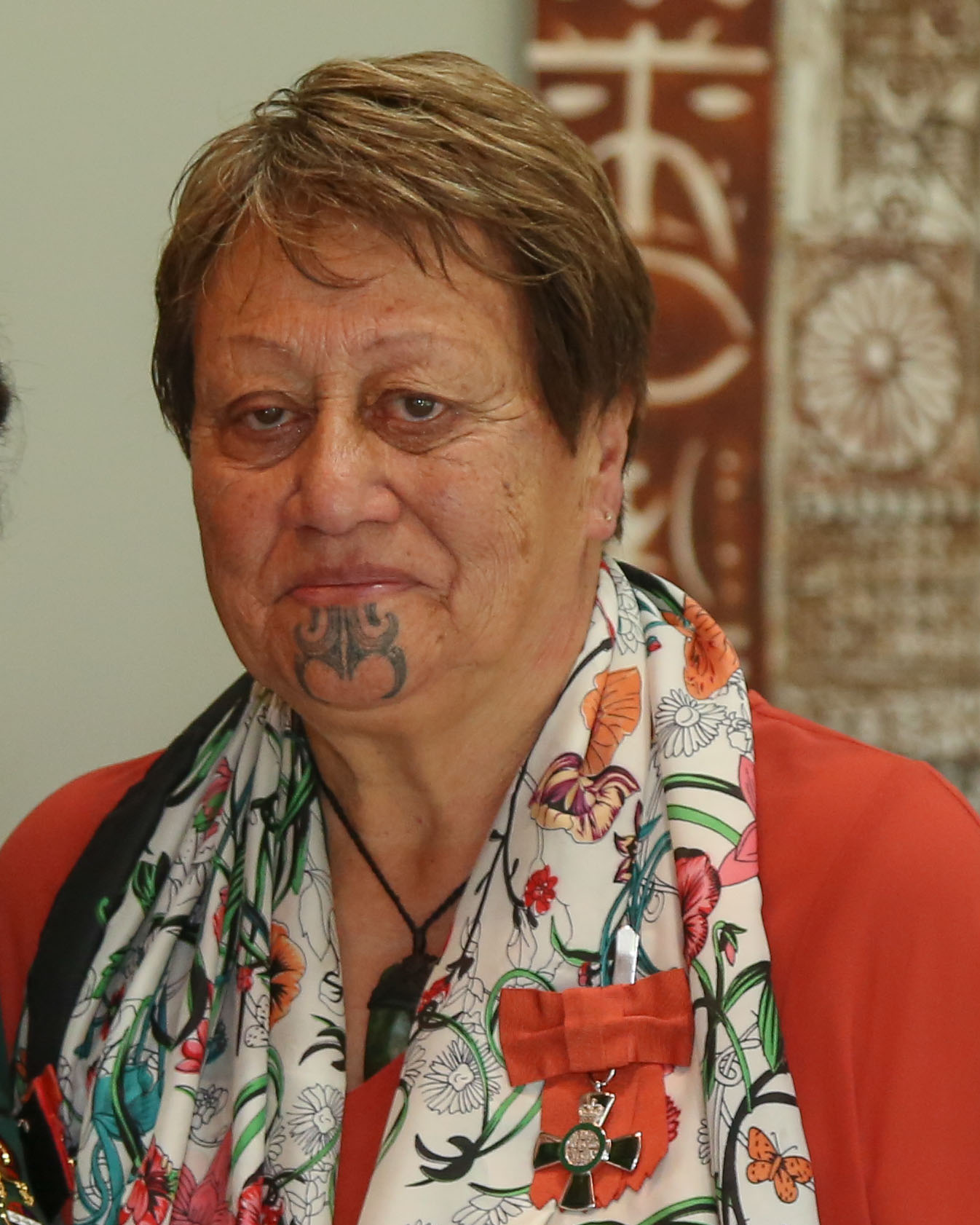
Amohaere Tangitu

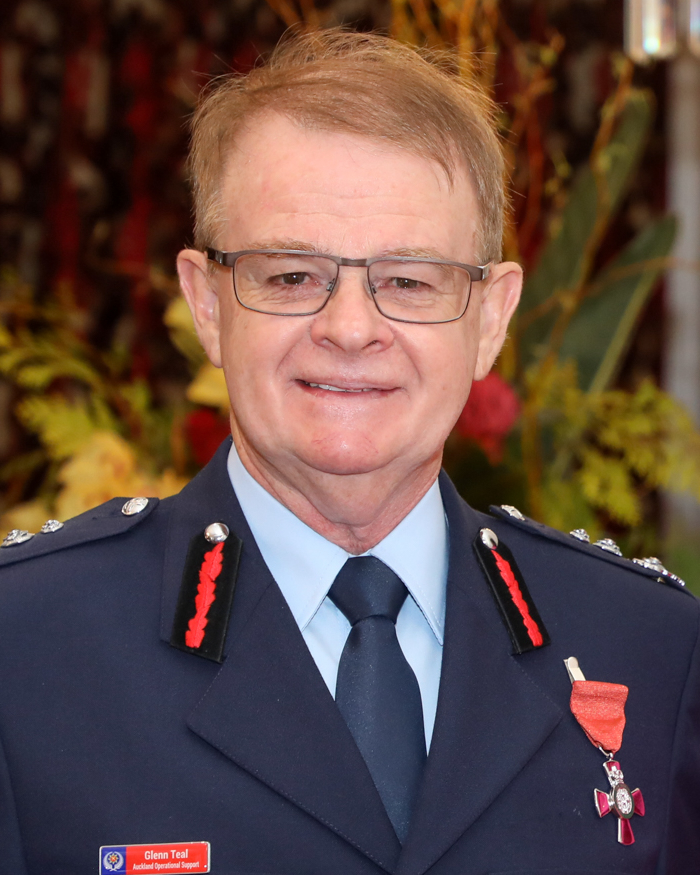
Glenn Teal

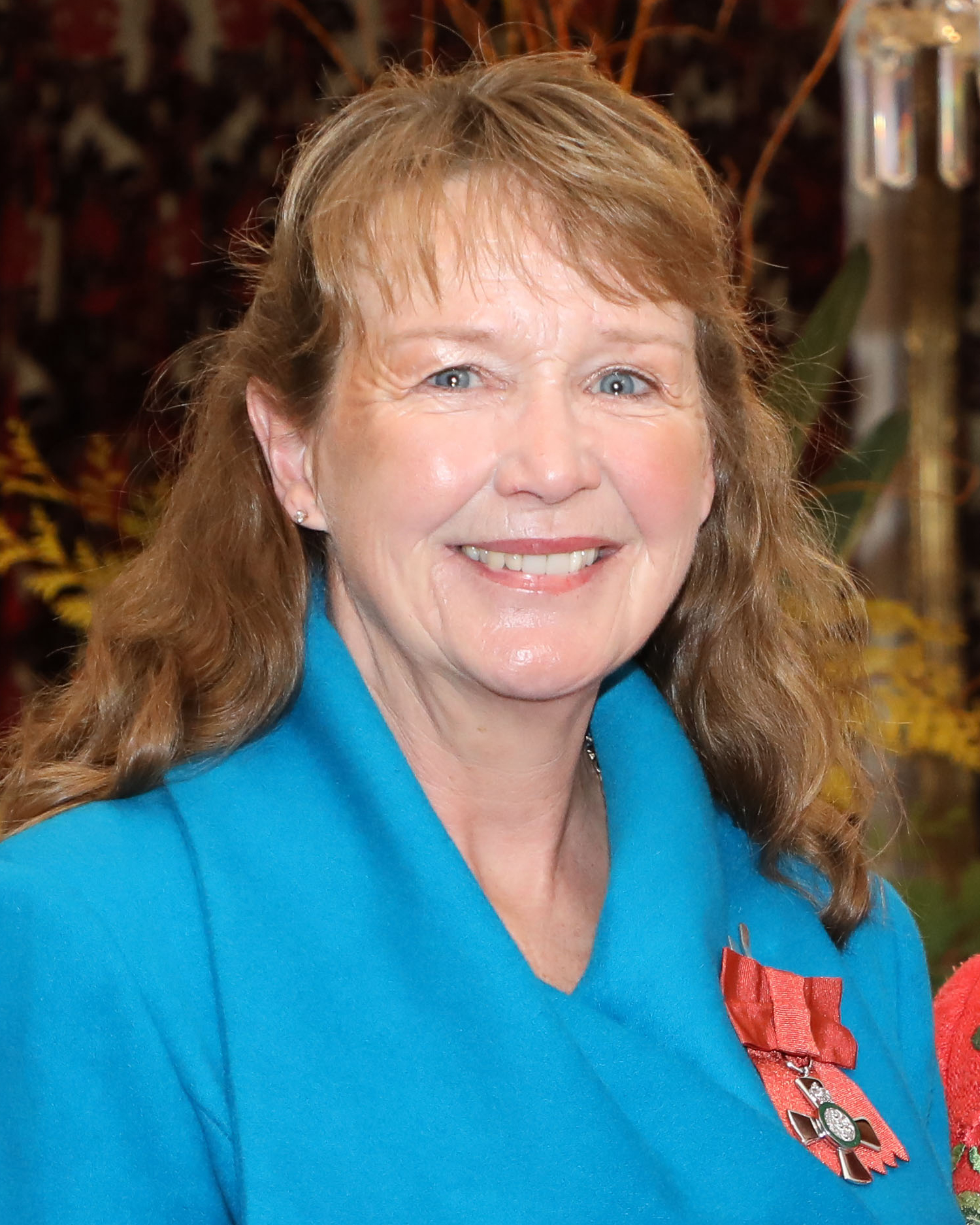
Ally Todd

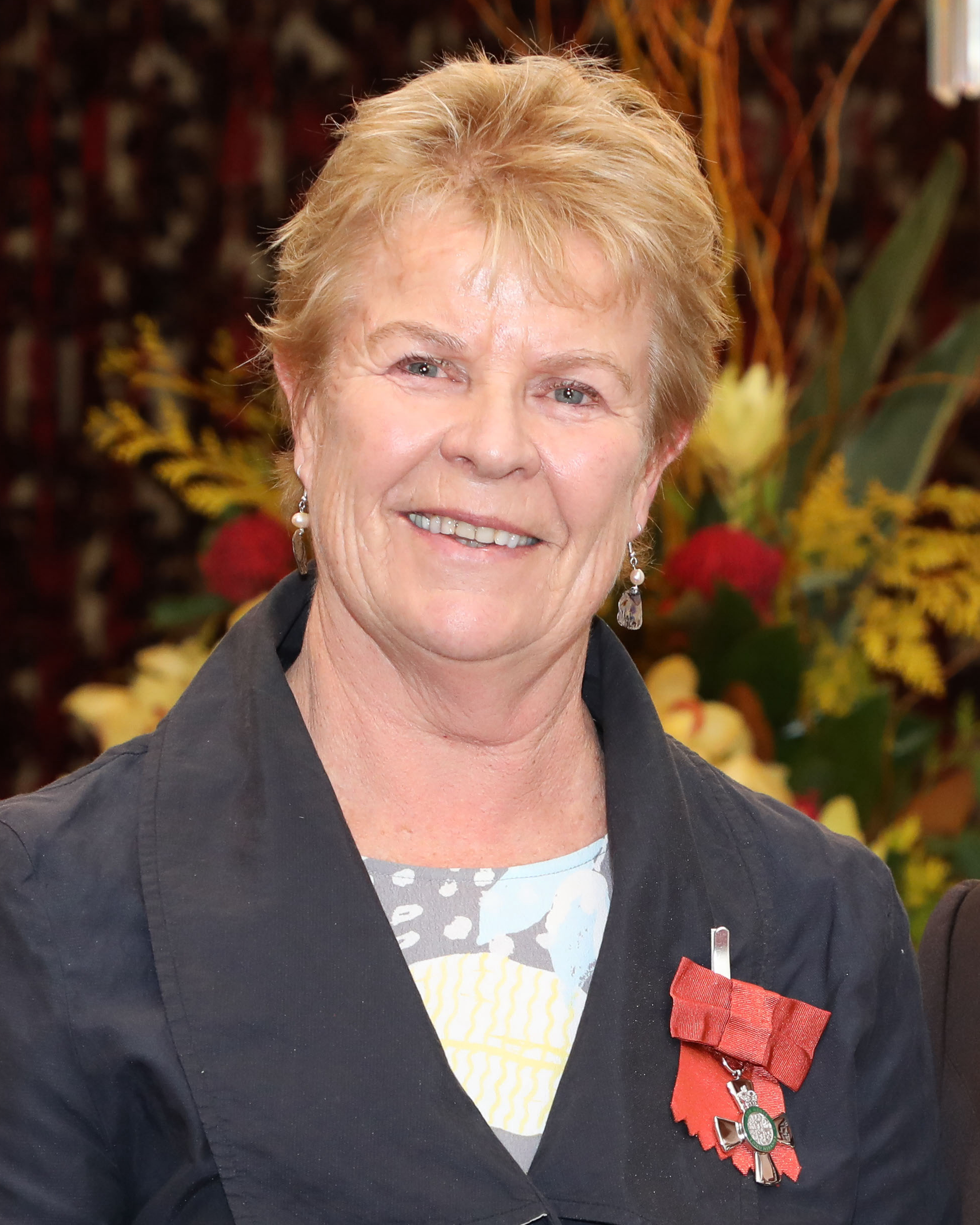
Kris Tynan

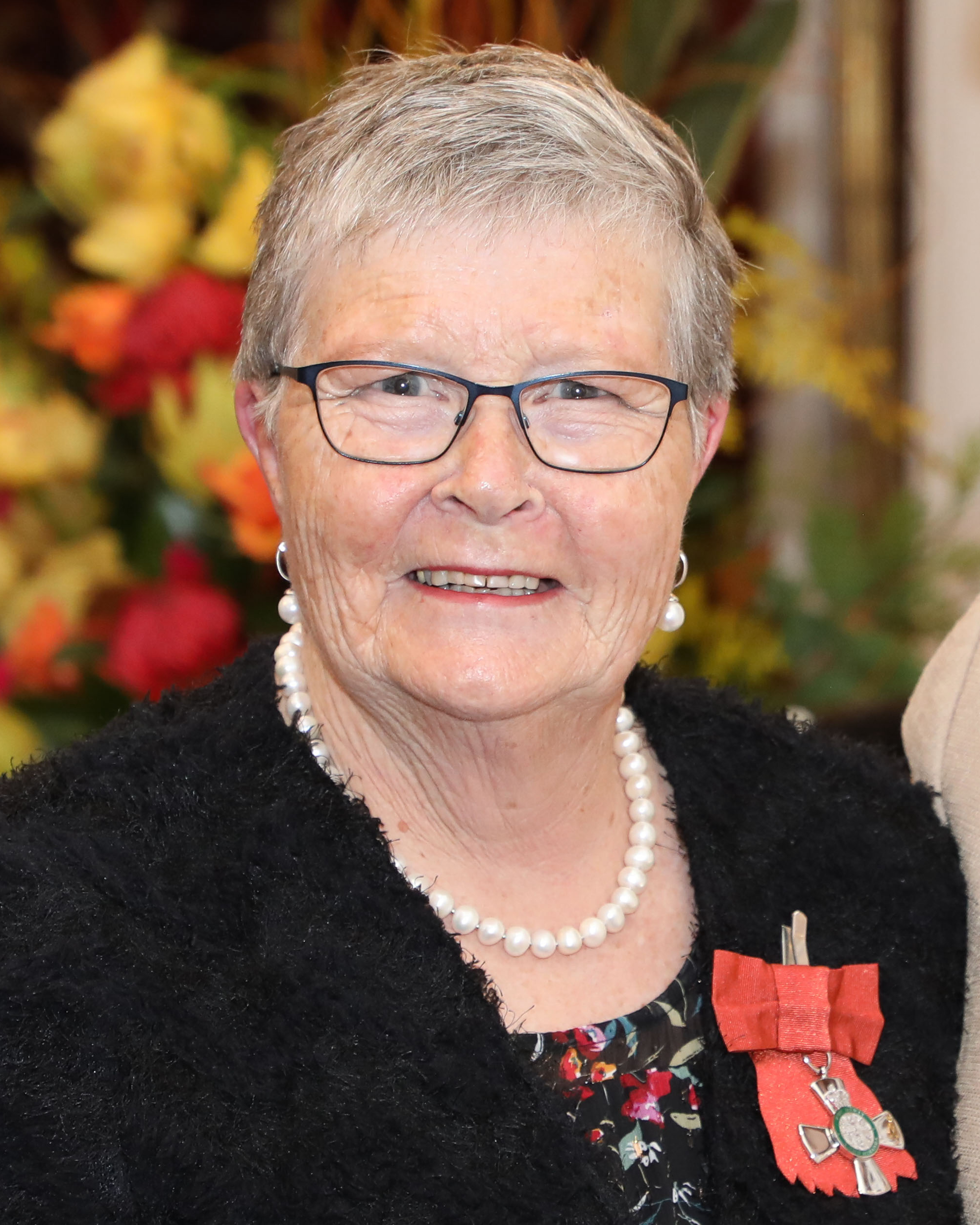
Joss Urbahn

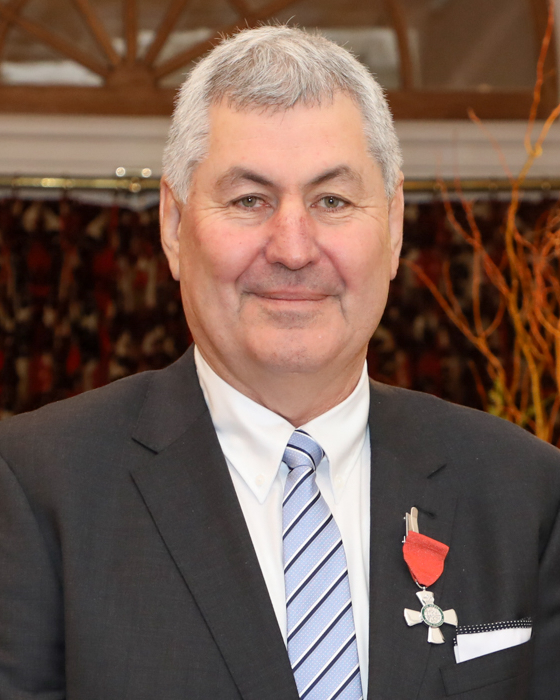
Lewis Warner

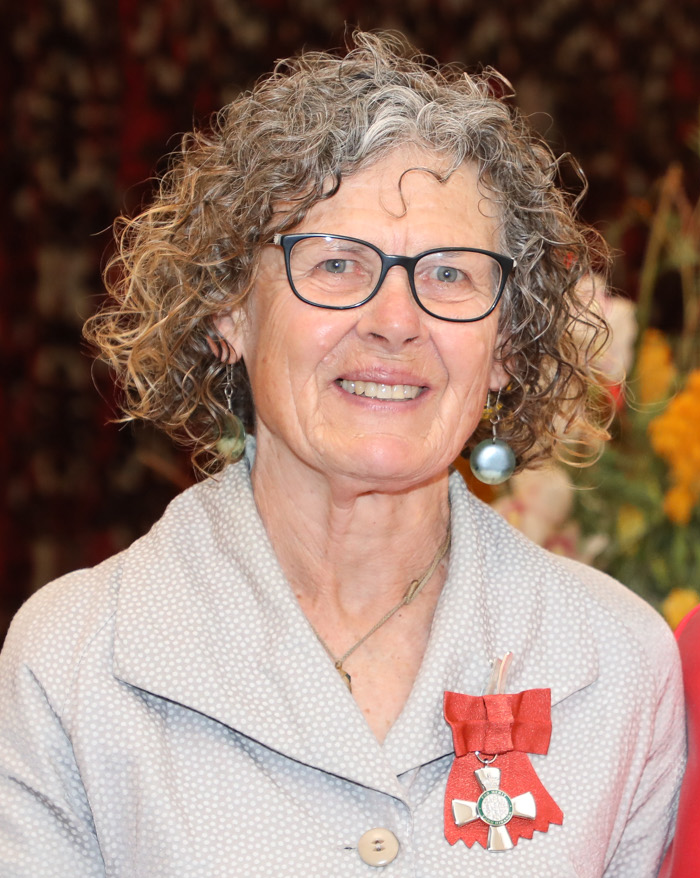
Lisa Whittle

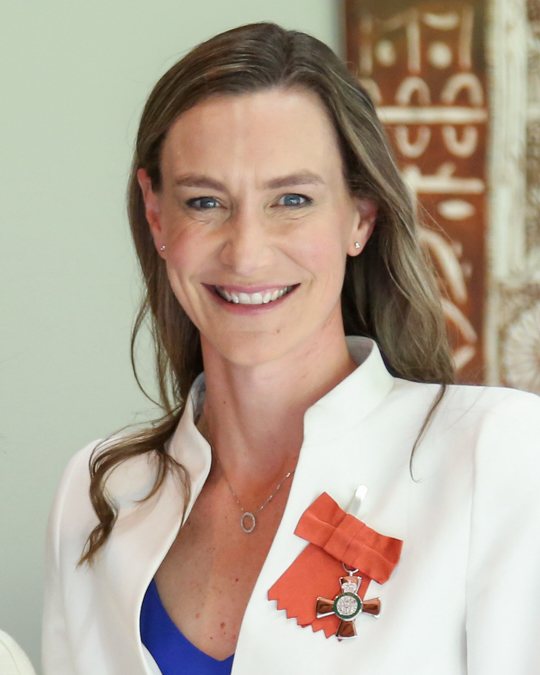
Adine Wilson

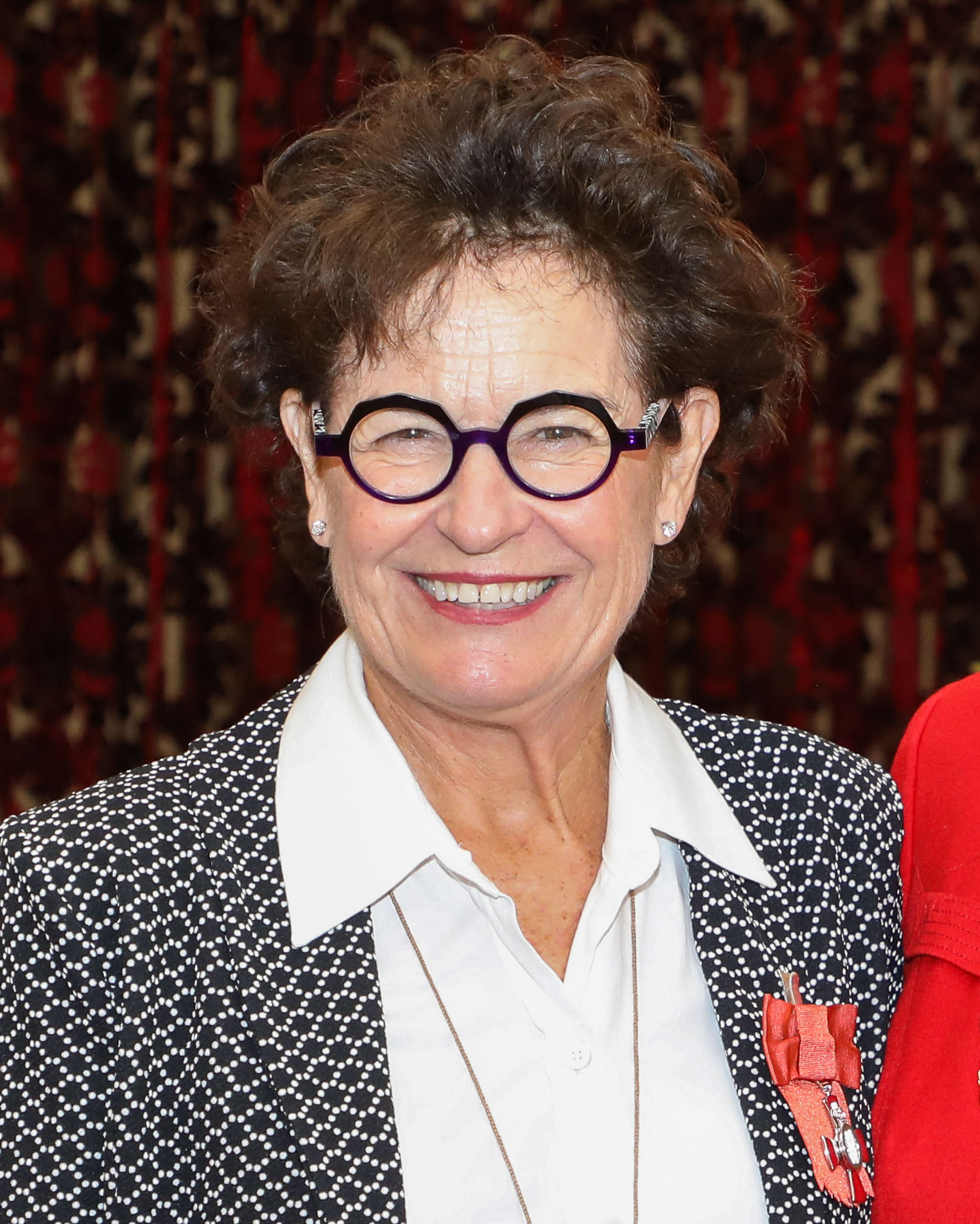
Nicki Wilson

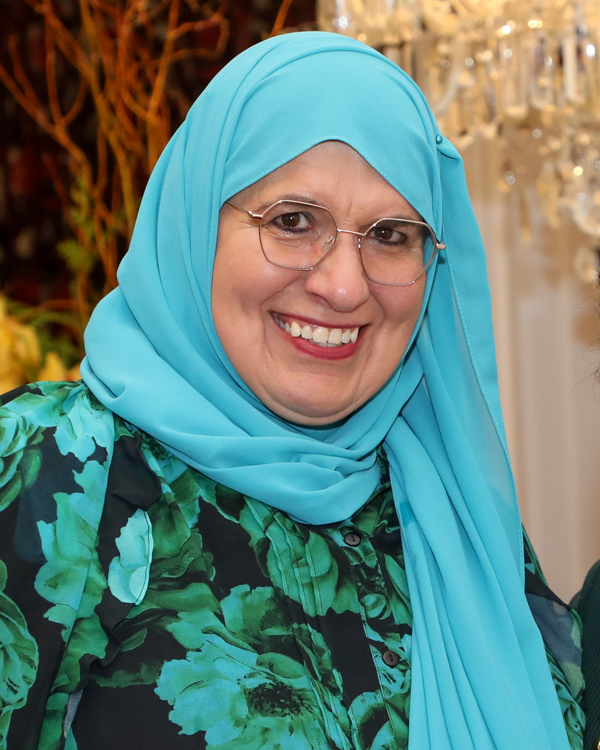
Aliya Danzeisen

== Companion of the King's Service Order (KSO) ==
- Daniel Edward Allen-Gordon – of Tauranga. For services to youth and charitable governance.
- Josephine Huti Anderson – of Te Kūiti. For services to Māori.
- Colleen Brenda Brown MNZM – of Auckland. For services to people with disabilities, local government and the community.
- Elizabeth Hera Cunningham JP – of Christchurch. For services to governance.
- Michael John Hollings – of Wellington. For services to education and Māori.
- Karen Sandra Morrison-Hume – of Raglan. For services to the community.
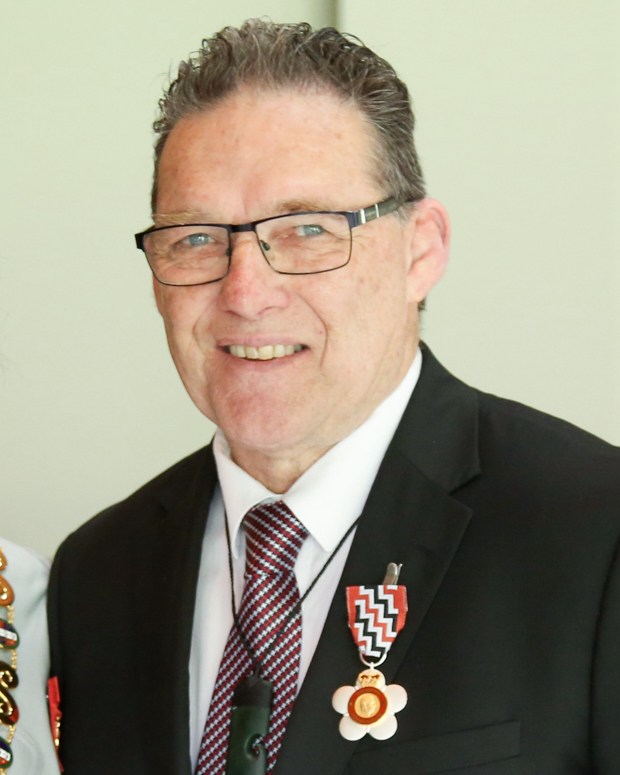
Dan Allen-Gordon

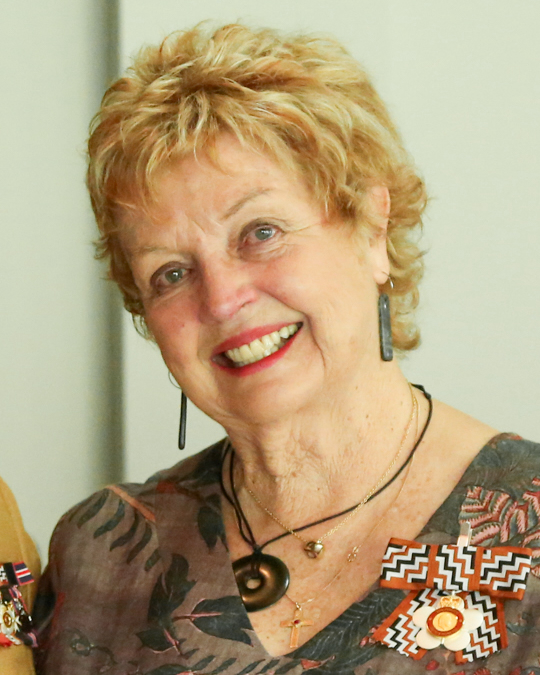
Colleen Brown

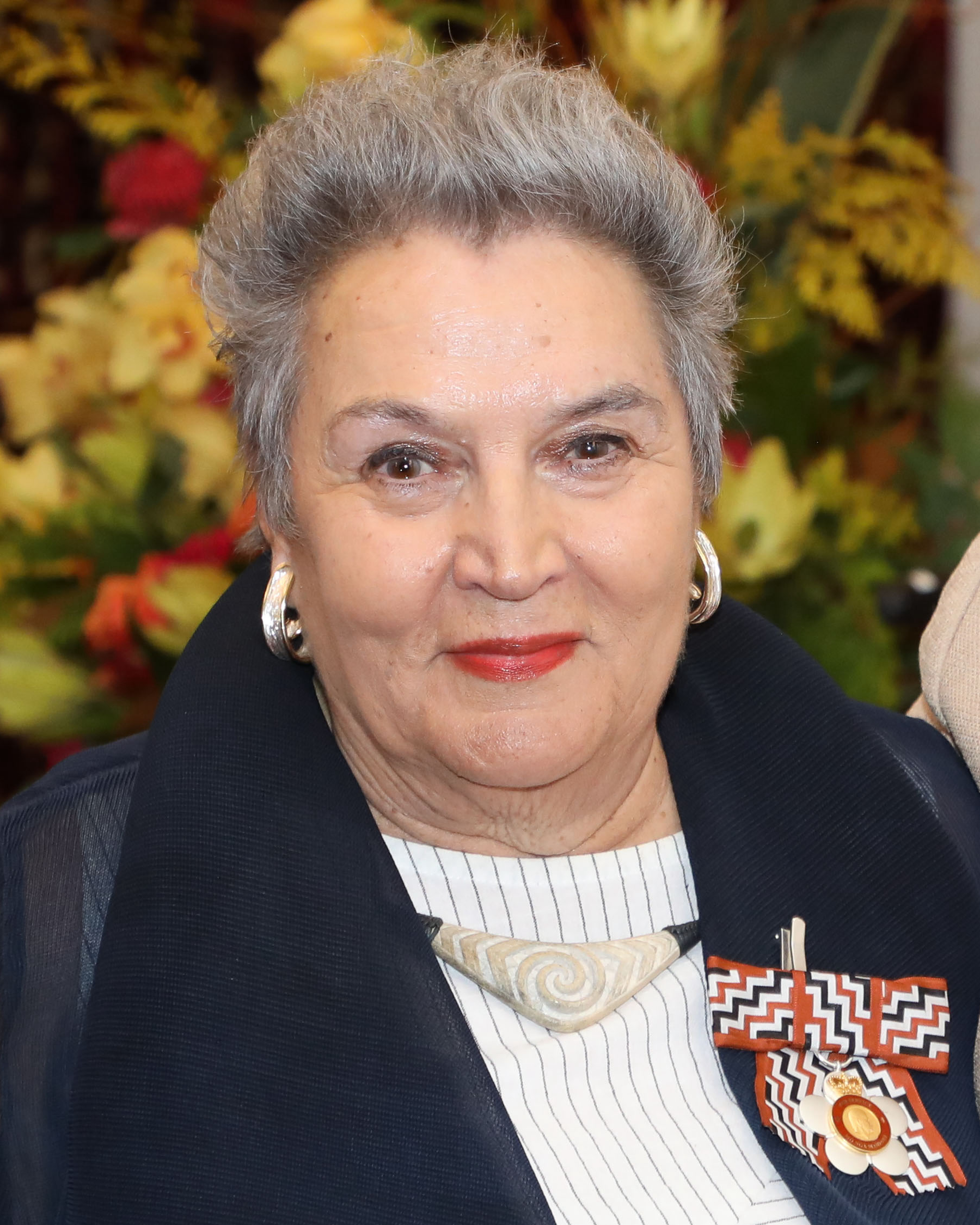
Elizabeth Cunningham

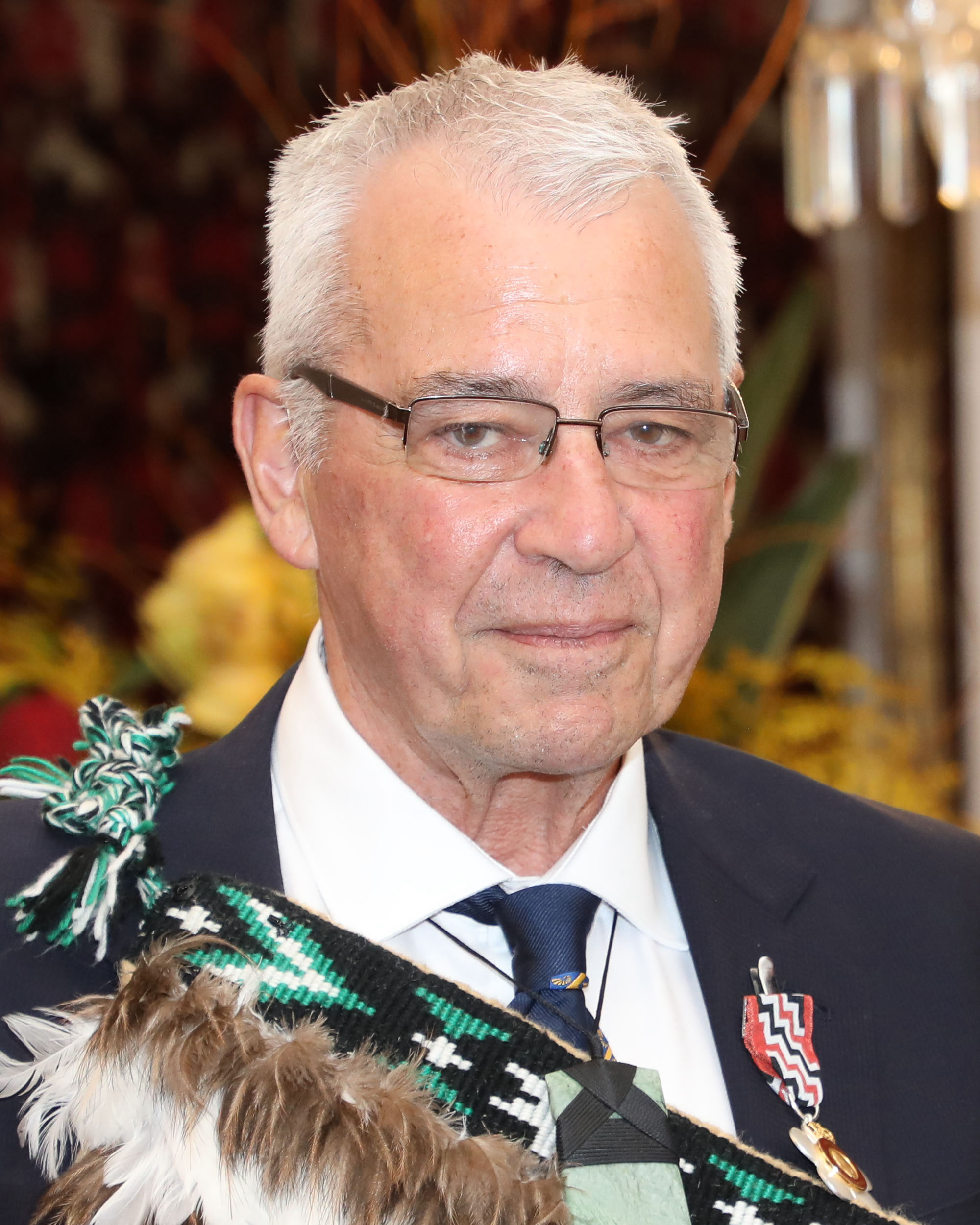
Michael Hollings

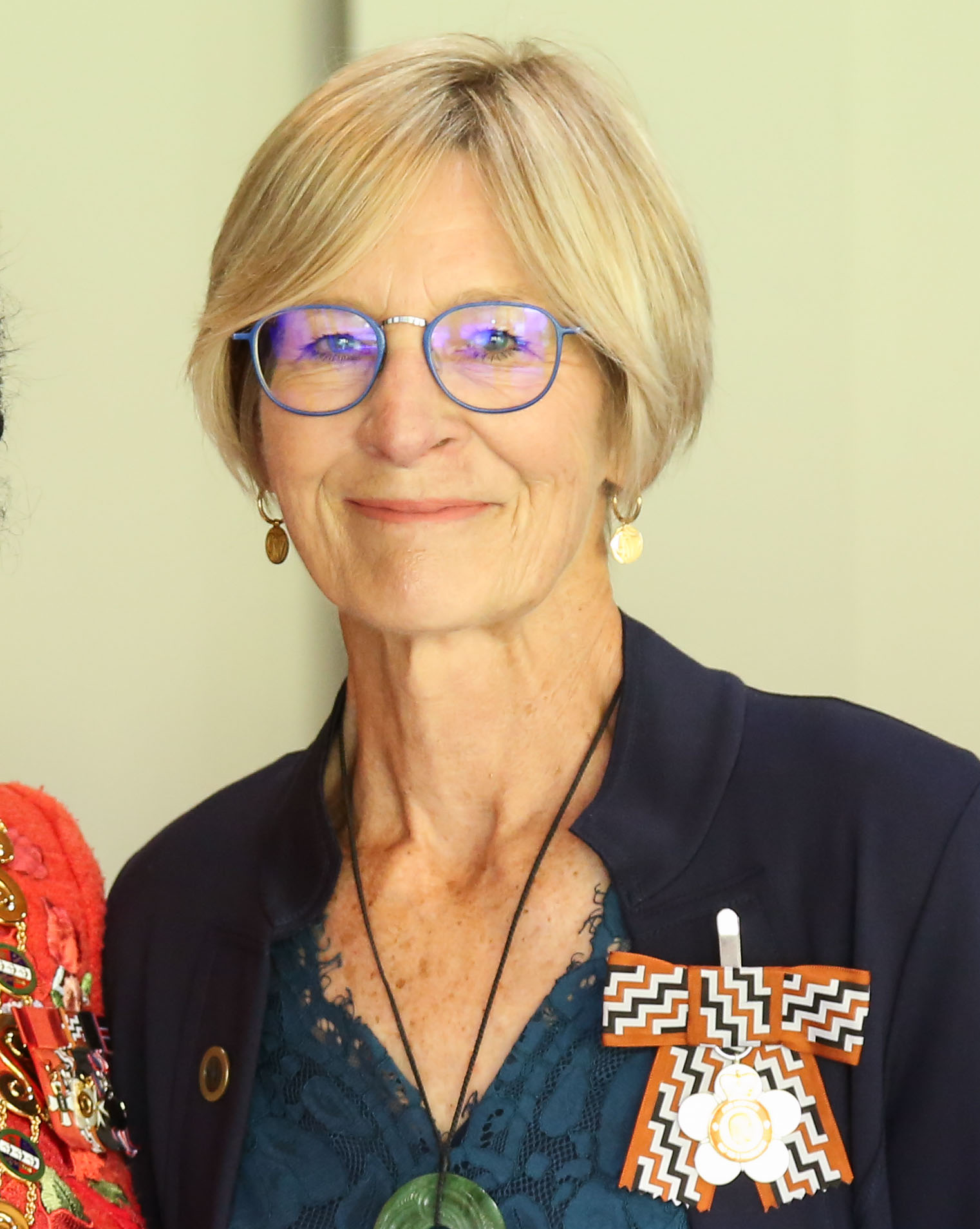
Karen Morrison‑Hume

== King's Service Medal (KSM) ==
- Mervyn Ralph Allison – of Raumati. For services to brass bands.
- Marie Bennett – of Dunedin. For services to seniors.
- Lance Basil Berry JP – of Rongotea. For services to Fire and Emergency New Zealand and the community.
- Patricia Mackenzie Boyle – of Invercargill. For services to the community.
- John McMeekan Bray – of Auckland. For services to rugby league.
- Henry Lionel Gordon Brittain – of Waikanae. For services to transport history and tourism.
- Janice Vivienne Burnett – of Prebbleton. For services to the community.
- Sandra Beryl Burrow – of Orewa. For services to swimming.
- David Leon Cade – of Taupō. For services to conservation and bio-security awareness.
- Ian Stuart Campbell – of Te Awamutu. For services to Fire and Emergency New Zealand and taekwon-do.
- Patricia Frances Carrick-Clarke – of Nelson. For services to sport, particularly cricket.
- Brian Rex Carter JP – of Bulls. For services to Fire and Emergency New Zealand.
- Marian Tadeusz Ceregra – of Lower Hutt. For services to the Polish community and veterans. (Note: Deceased. His Majesty's approval of this award took effect on 14 May 2024, prior to the date of death.)
- Robin Florence Clarke – of Waikanae. For services to the community.
- Jacqueline Ann Dwyer JP – of Pātea. For services to the community.
- Robert Allan Feisst – of Cambridge. For services to the community. (Note: Deceased. His Majesty's approval of this award took effect on 20 May 2024, prior to the date of death.)
- Patricia Anne George – of Matakohe. For services to mosaic art and the community.
- Mervyn Allen Gore – of Auckland. For services to rugby league.
- Dr Matire Louise Ngarongoa Harwood – of Auckland. For services to Māori health.
- Mailigi Hetutū – of Wellington. For services to the Niuean community.
- Leslie Tamihana Hokianga – of Hastings. For services to physical fitness and mental health.
- Arthur Gregory Imms – of Kerikeri. For services to Fire and Emergency New Zealand.
- Tupuna Mataki Kaiaruna – of Auckland. For services to the Cook Islands community and performing arts.
- Katareina Whaiora Kaiwai – of Tokomaru Bay. For services to women and the civil construction industry.
- Maituteau Karora – of Auckland. For services to the Cook Islands community.
- Fraser Crompton William Lake – of Tūrangi. For services to the community.
- David John Laughlin – of Lyttelton. For services to conservation.
- Trevor Ross Marshall – of Māpua. For services to the community.
- Peter Donald McNeur – of Masterton. For services to education and the community.
- Marilyn Ann Milne – of Nelson. For services to netball.
- Charles James Nightingale – of Hokitika. For services to the community.
- Linda-Lee Odom – of Auckland. For services to people with disabilities and sport.
- Sharda Ashok Patel – of Wellington. For services to the Indian community and women.
- Bernard Lawrence Power OStJ – of Rangiora. For services to the community.
- David Grant Smith – of Carterton. For services to the community.
- Heather Merle Smith – of Carterton. For services to the community.
- Jillian Joan Spicer – of Palmerston North. For services to the community and refugees.
- Fay Taylor – of Mosgiel. For services to the community.
- Robert John Ryrie Webb JP – of Taihape. For services to Fire and Emergency New Zealand and the community.
- Glenn Victor Williams JP – of Te Puke. For services to Fire and Emergency New Zealand and the community.
- Vicki Margaret Wood – of Mount Maunganui. For services to victim support.
- Joseph Zawada – of Lower Hutt. For services to the Polish community and historical research.
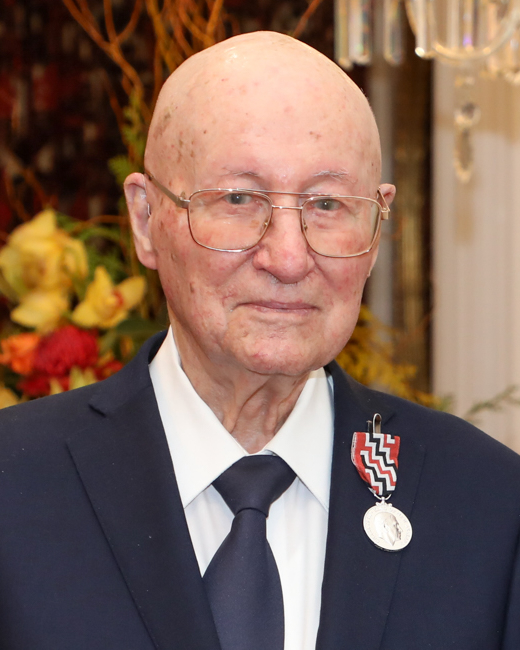
Mervyn Allison

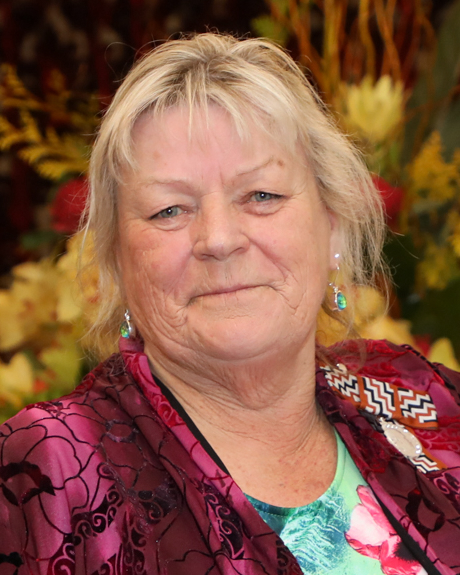
Marie Bennett

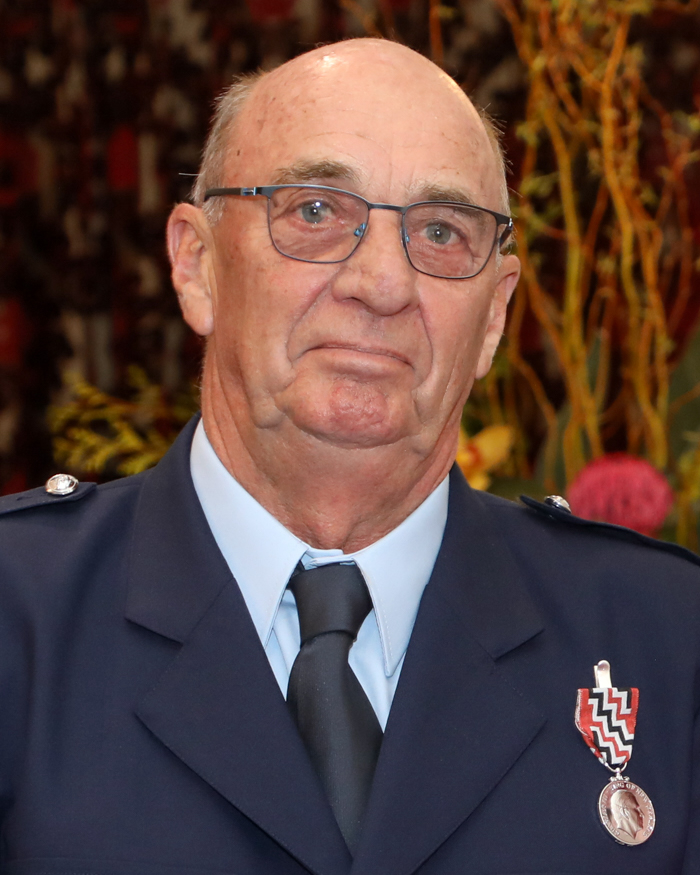
Lance Berry

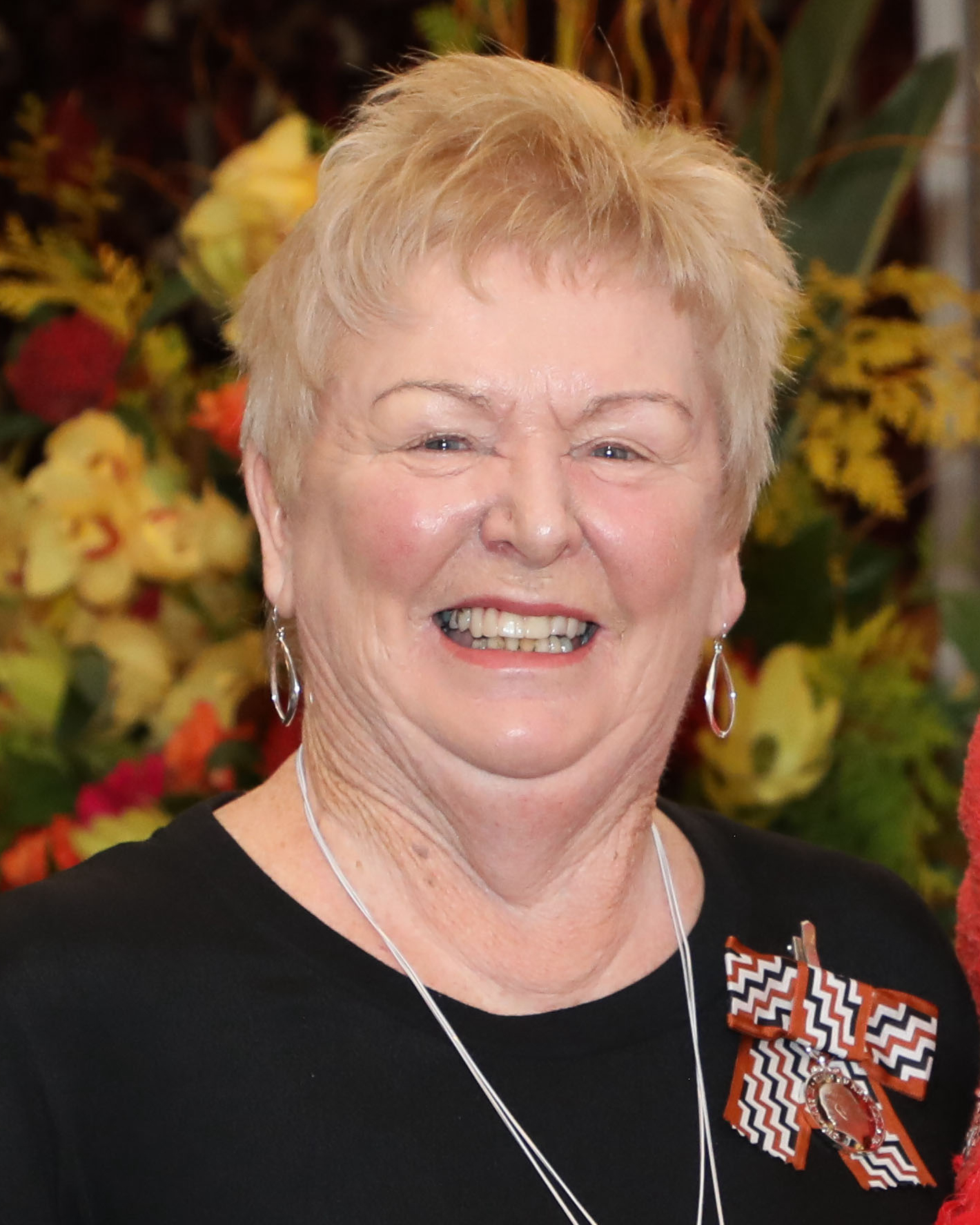
Trish Boyle

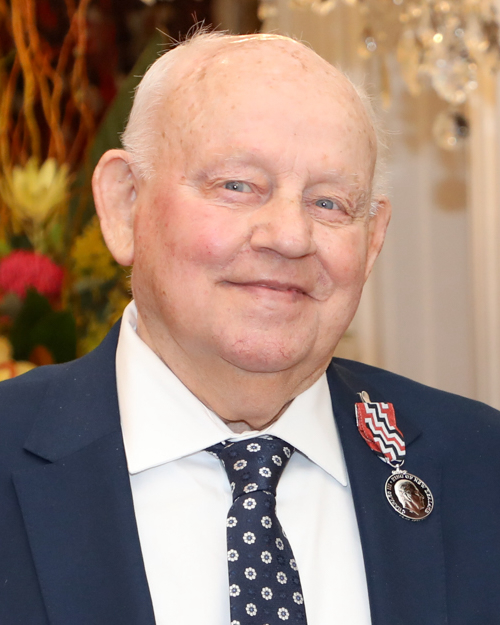
Henry Brittain

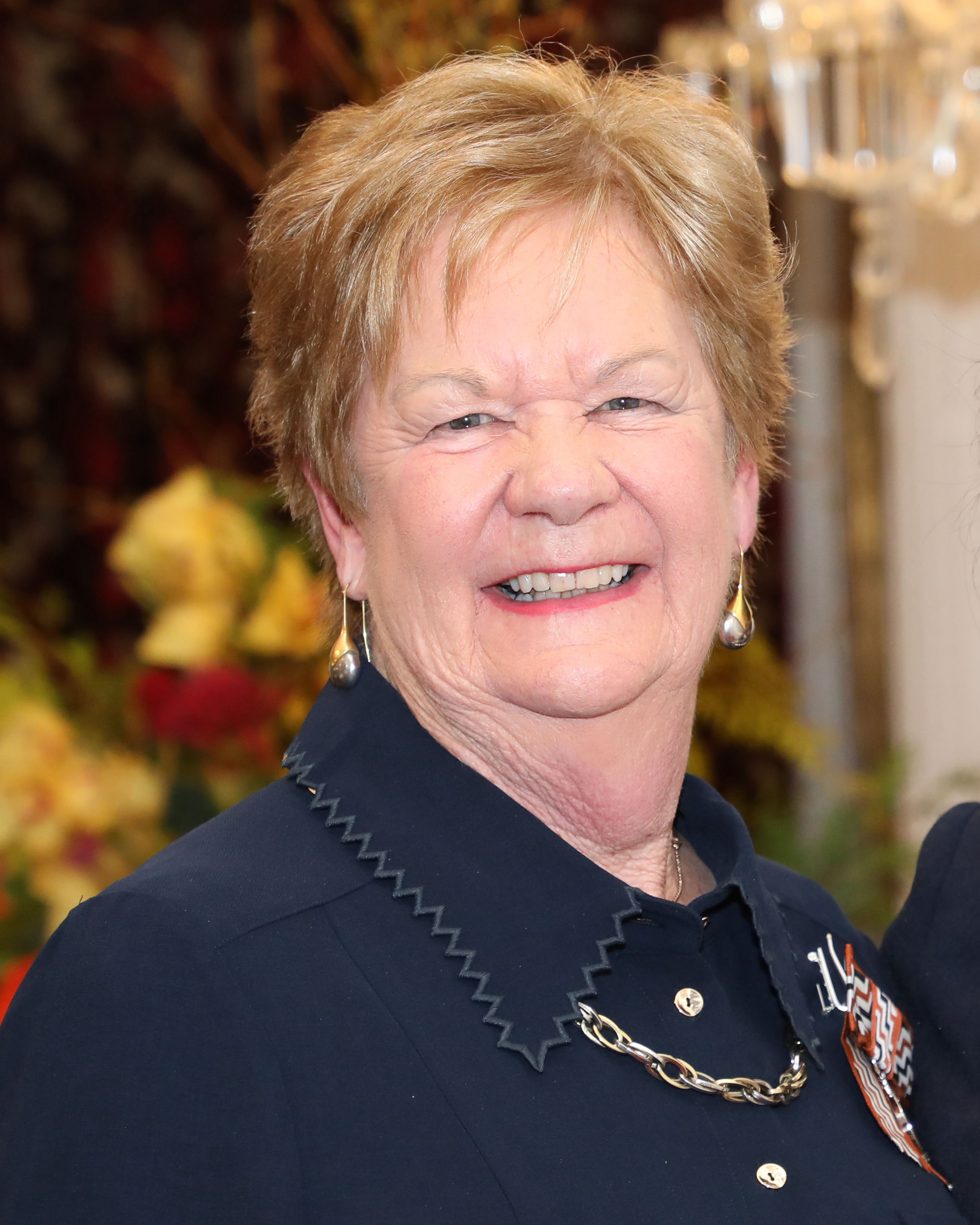
Janice Burnett

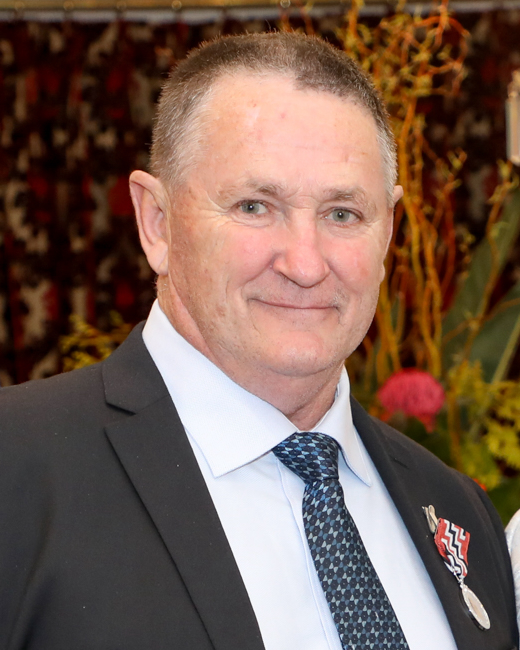
David Cade

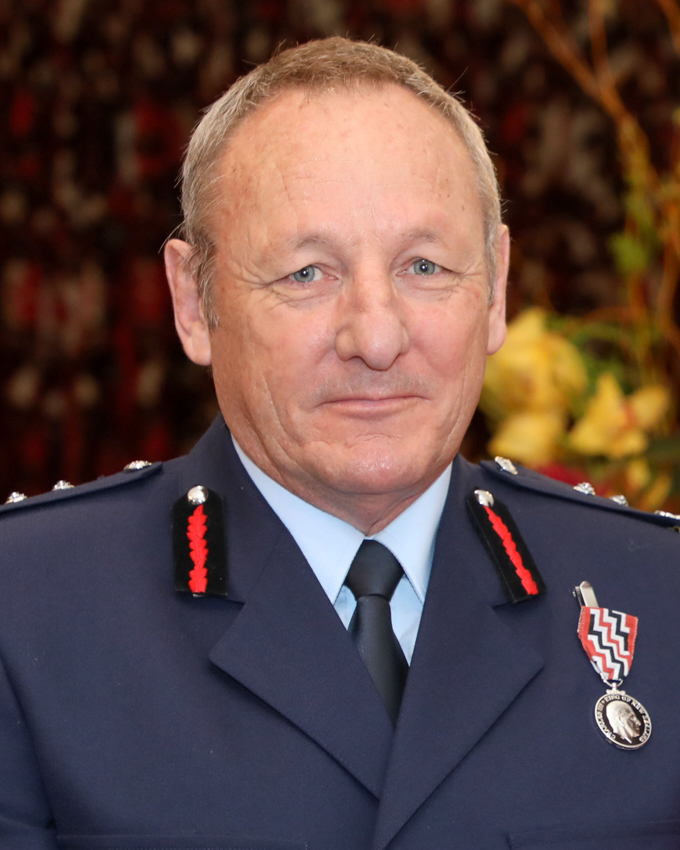
Ian Campbell

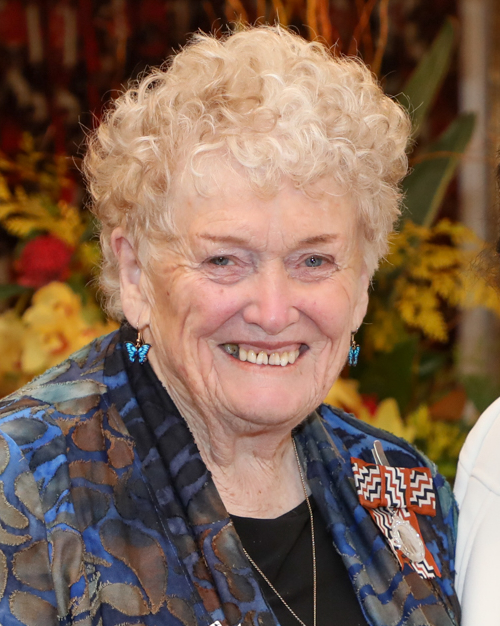
Pat Carrick-Clarke

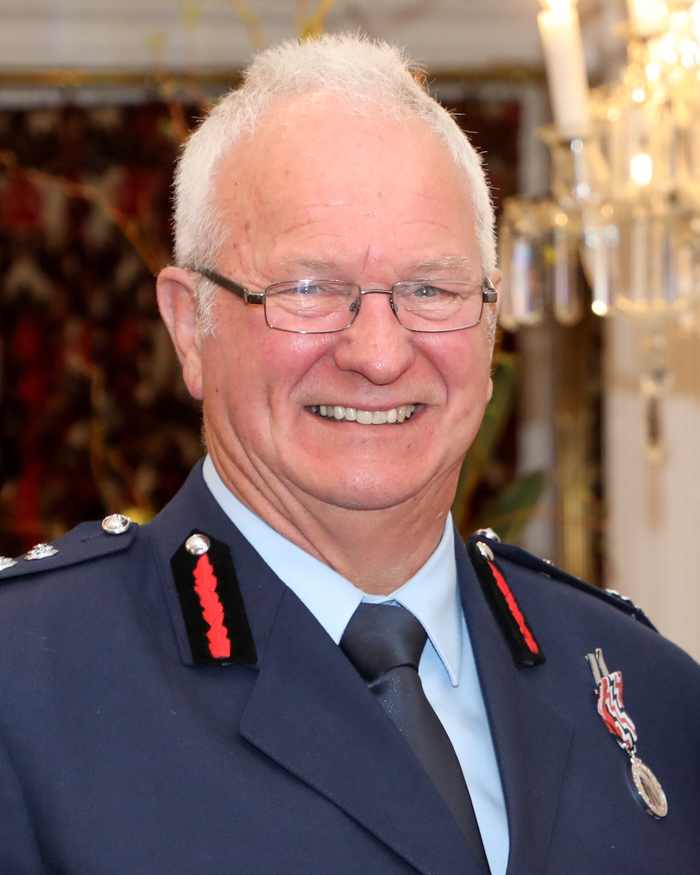
Brian Carter

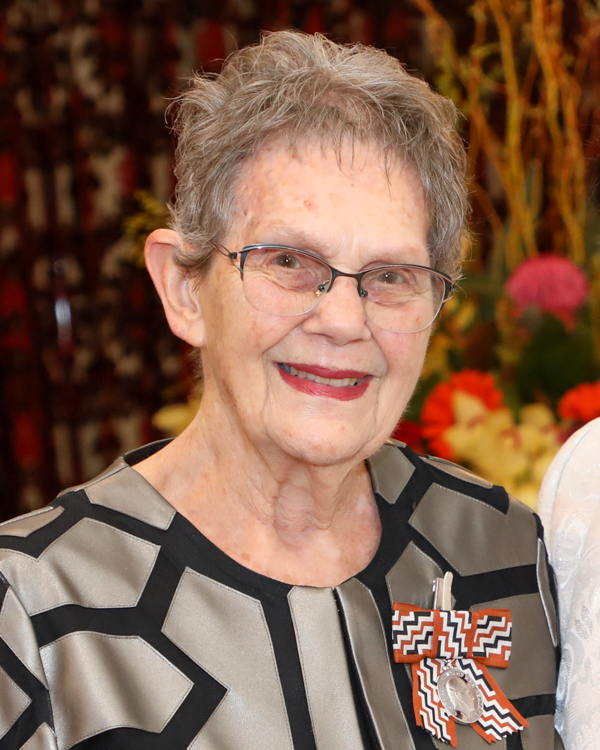
Robin Clarke

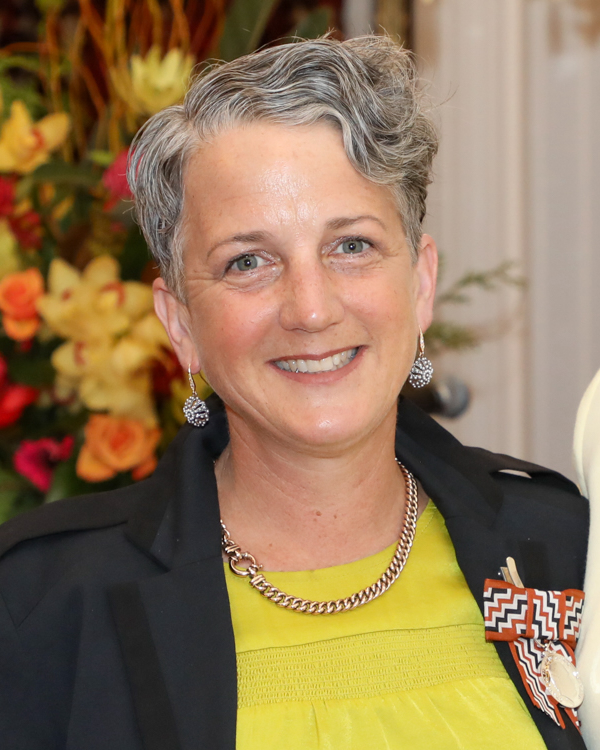
Jacqueline Dwyer

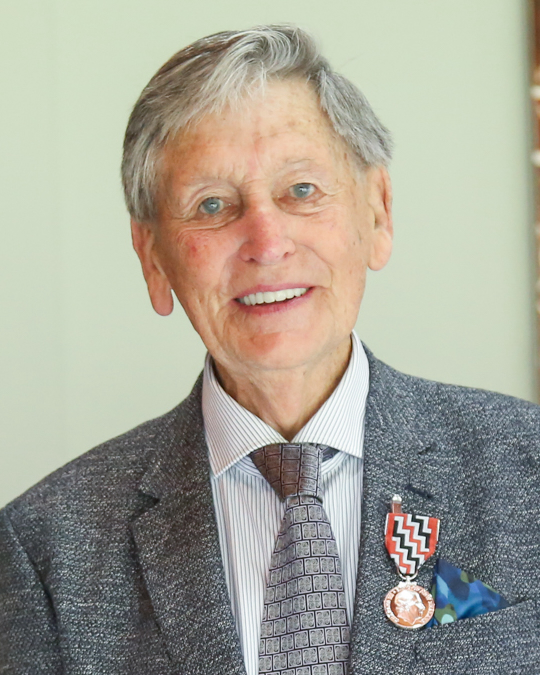
Allen Gore

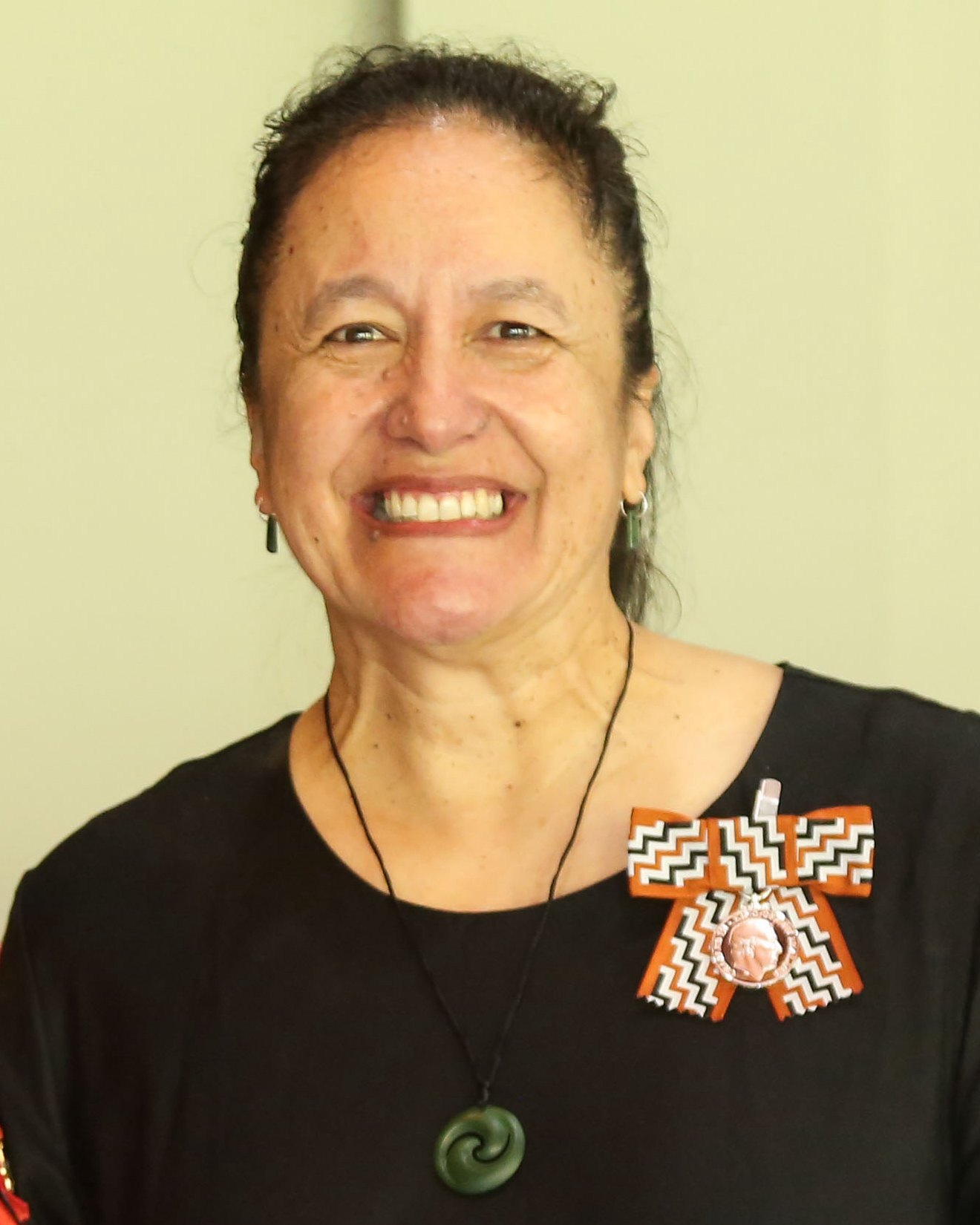
Matire Harwood

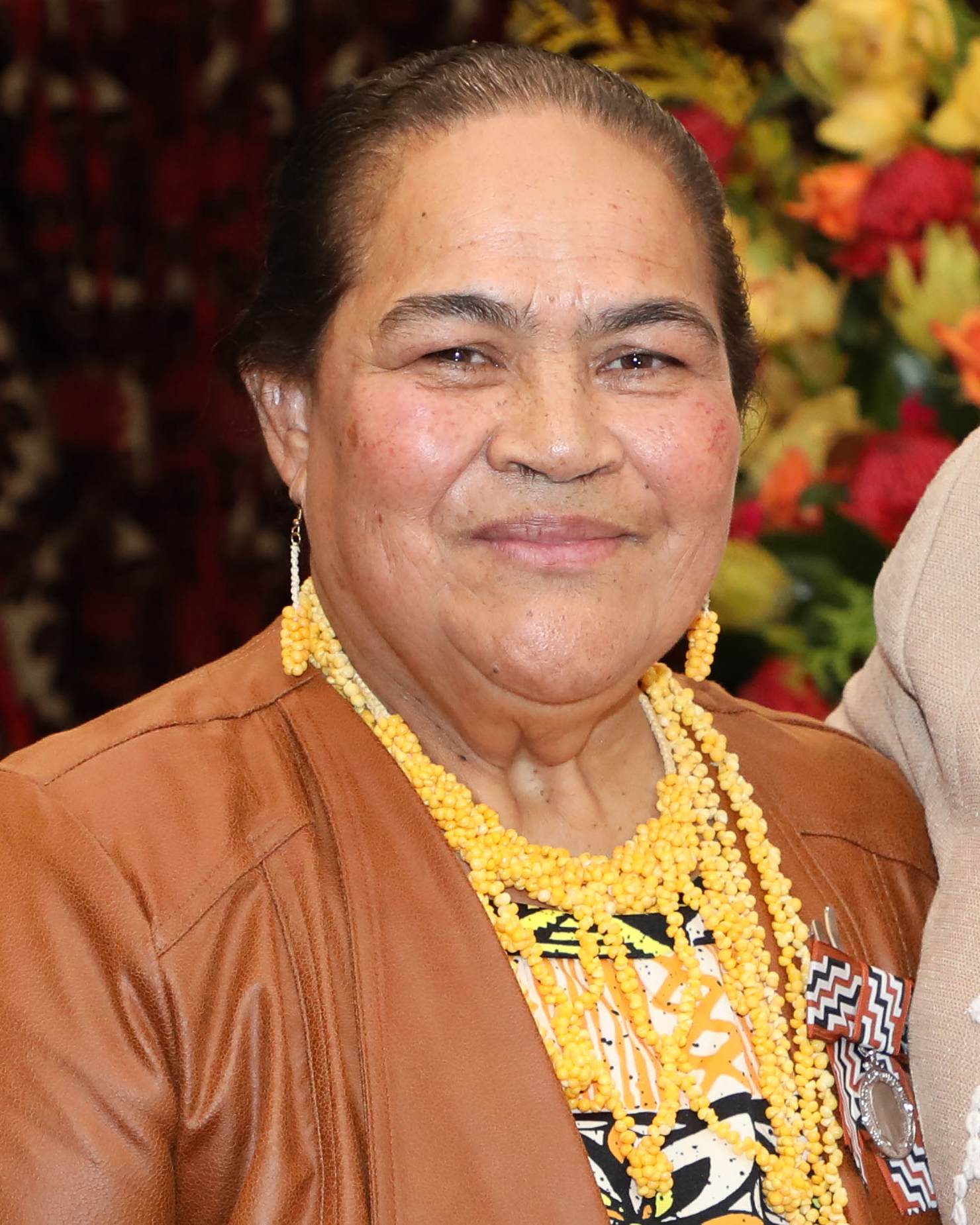
Ligi Hetutū

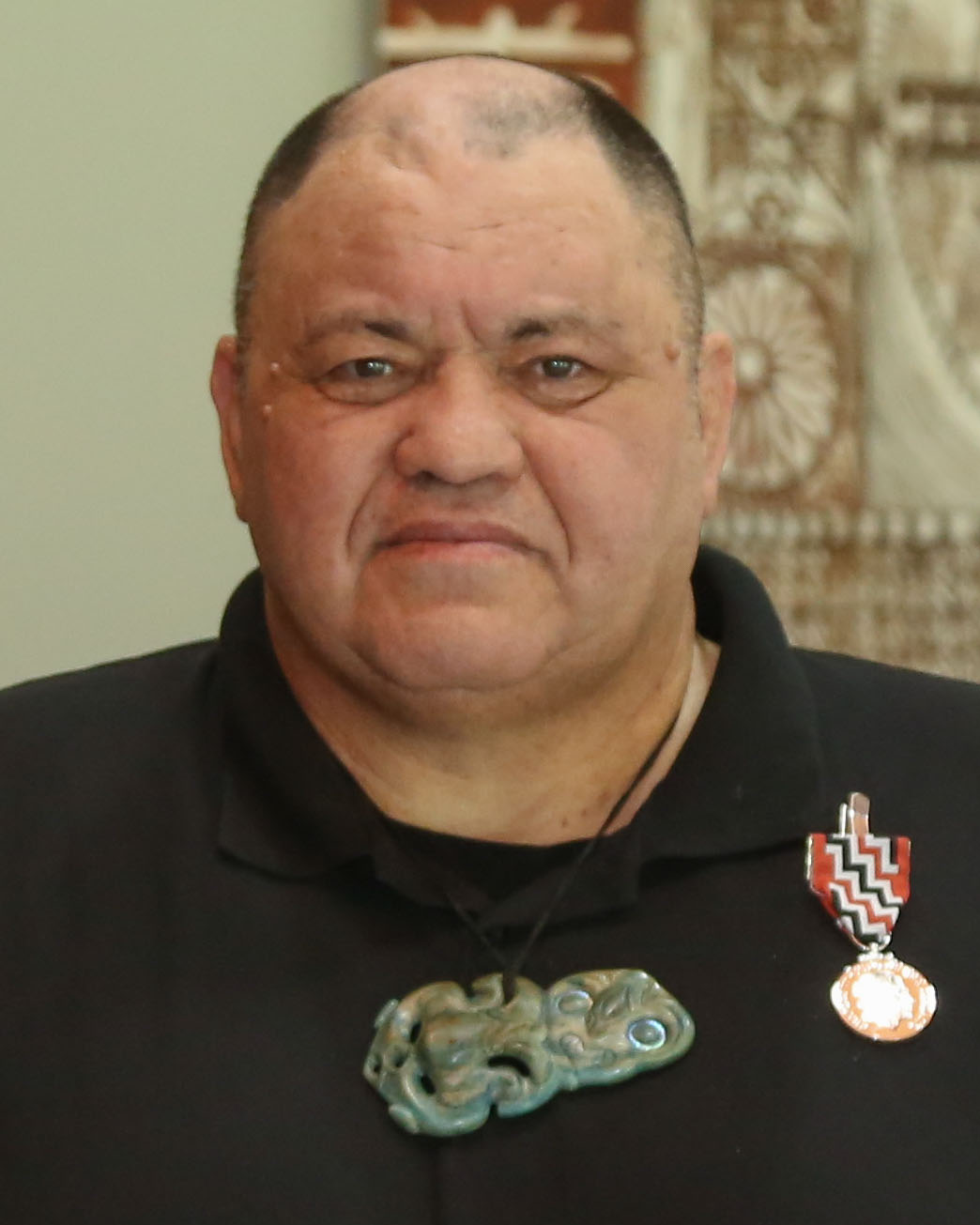
Les Hokianga

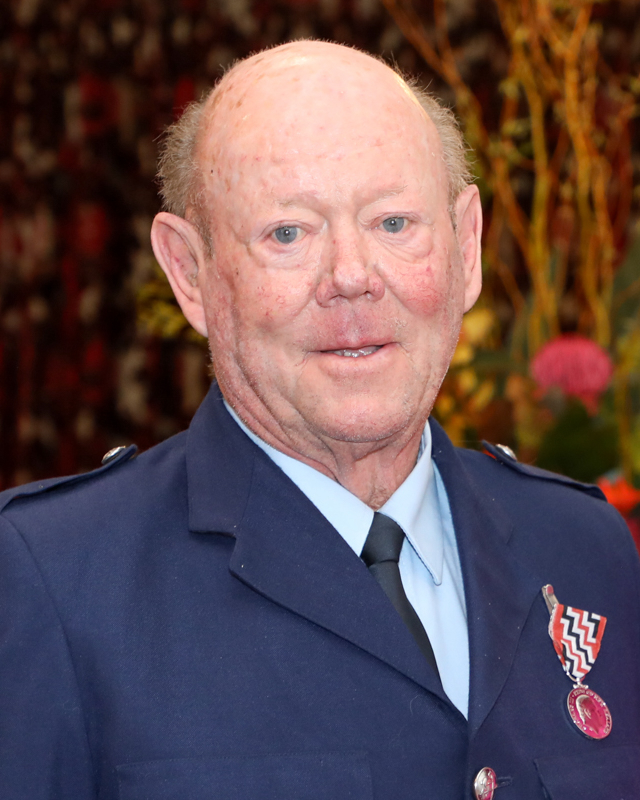
Greg Imms

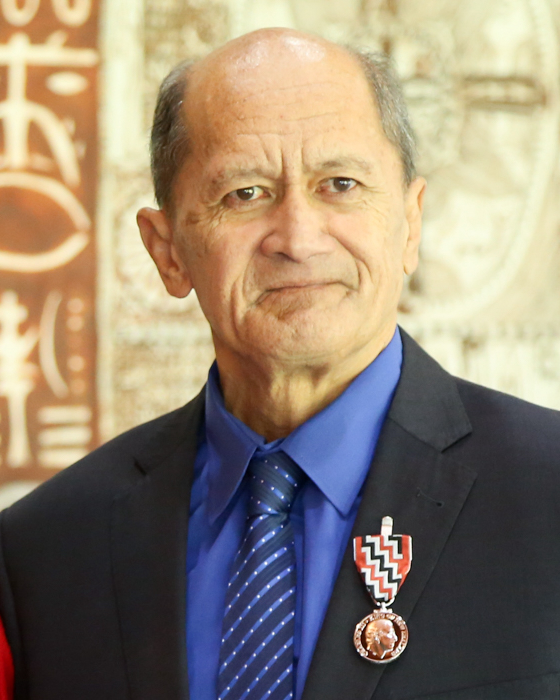
Tupuna Kaiaruna

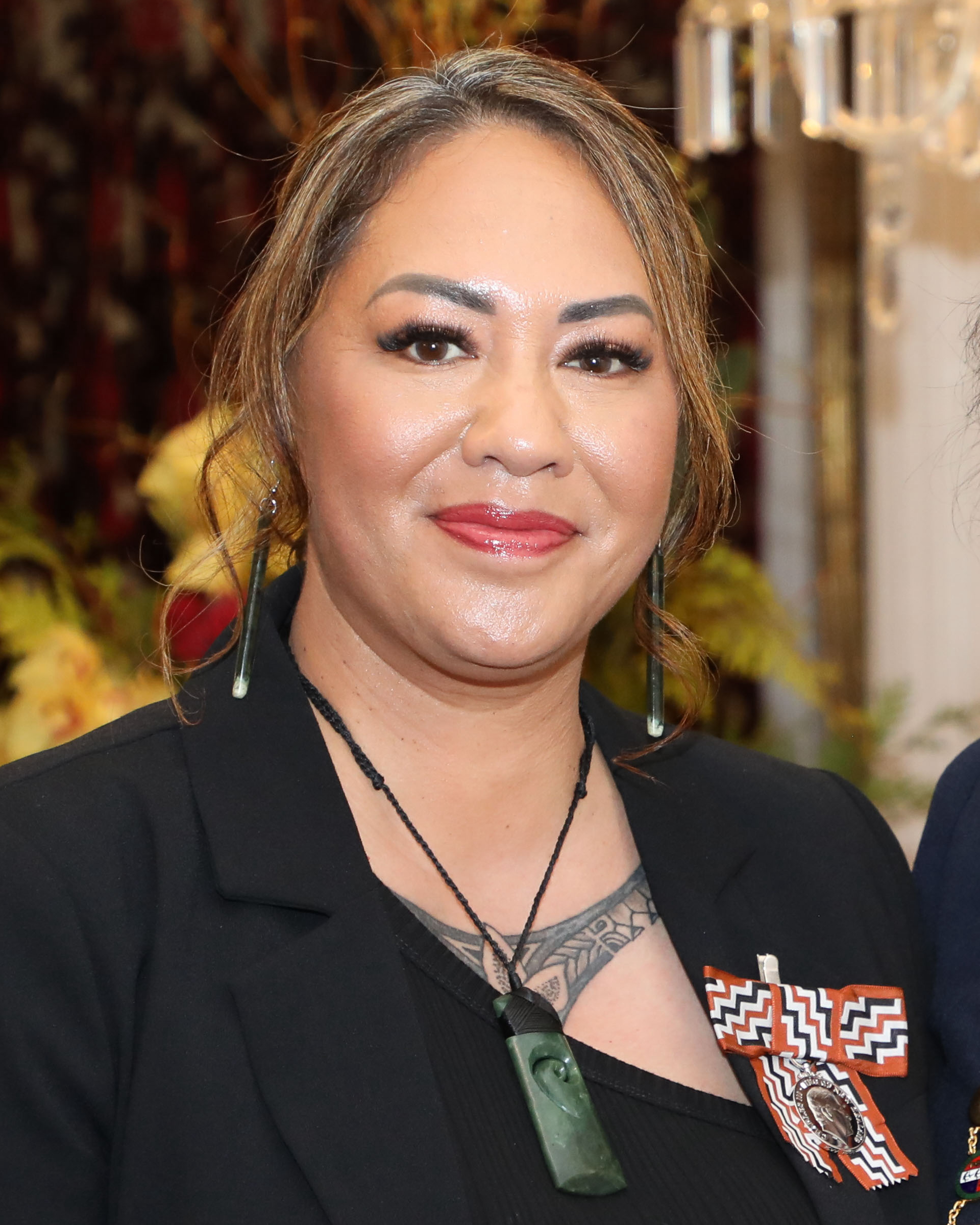
Katareina Kaiwai

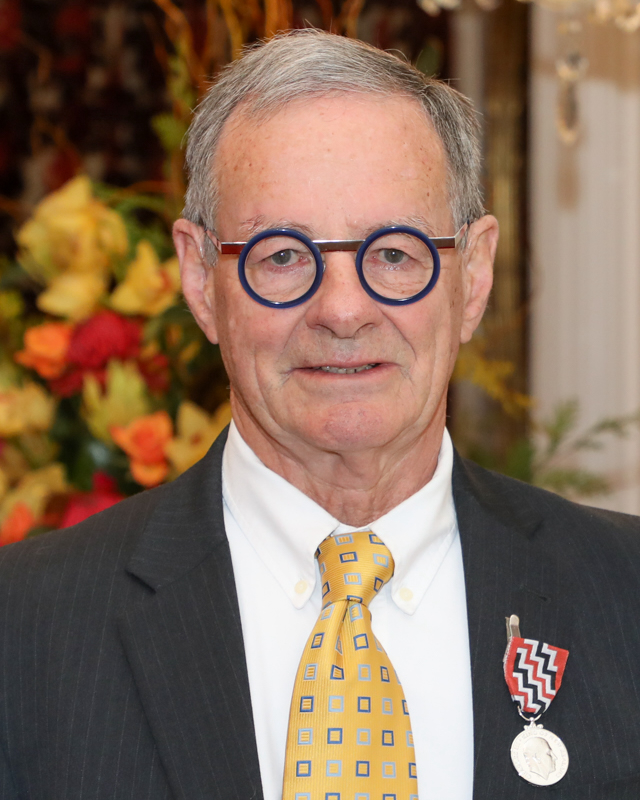
Fraser Lake

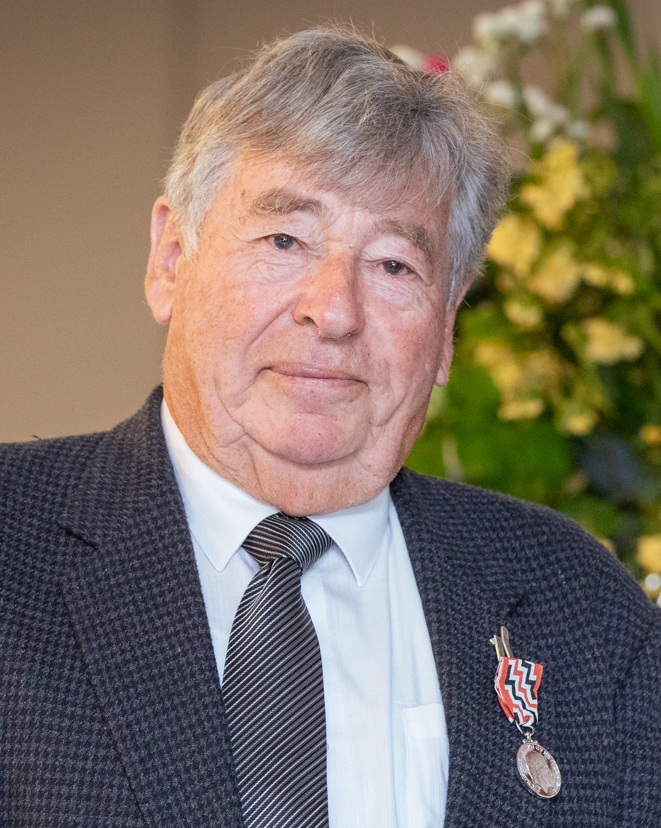
David Laughlin

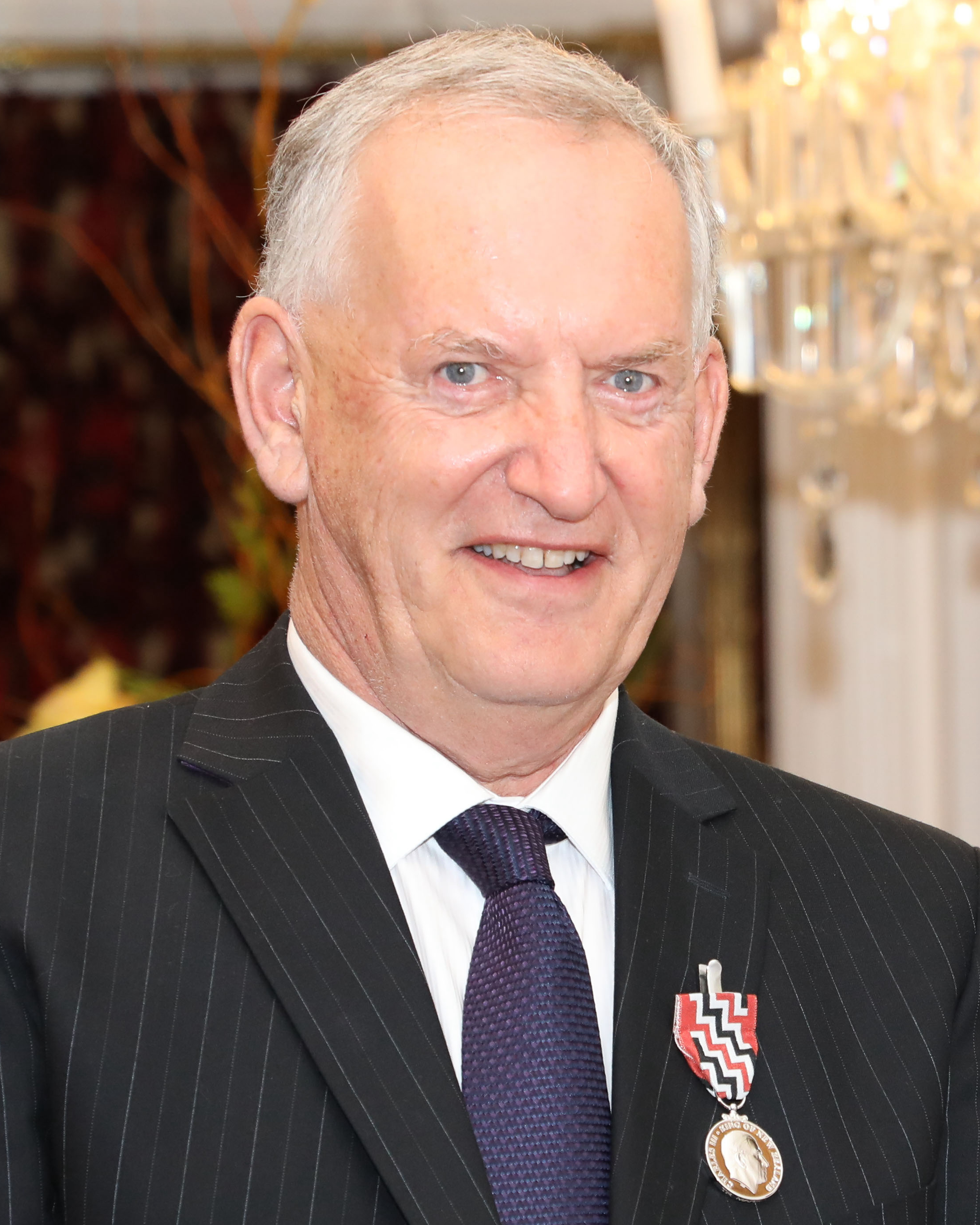
Trevor Marshall

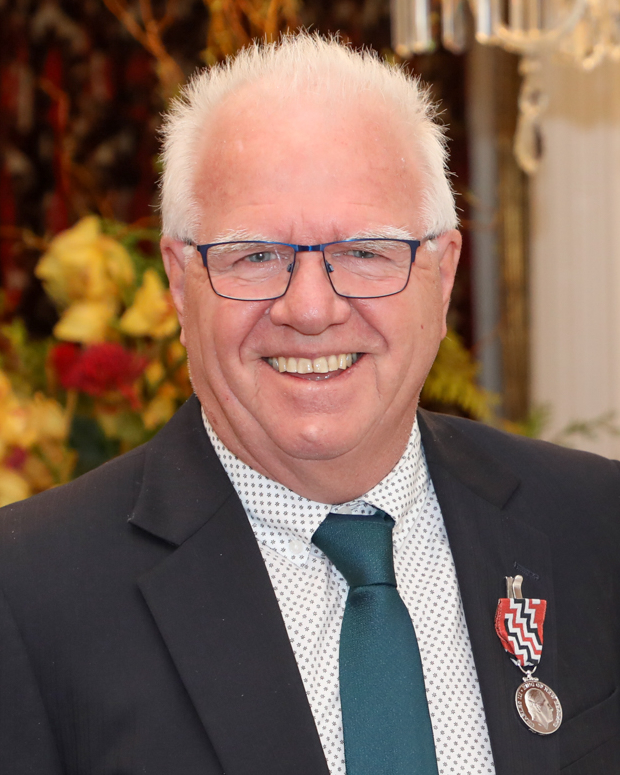
Peter McNeur

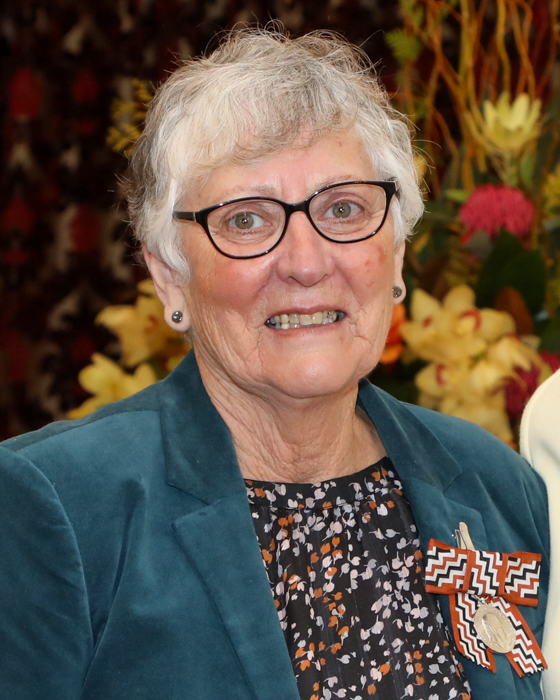
Marilyn Milne

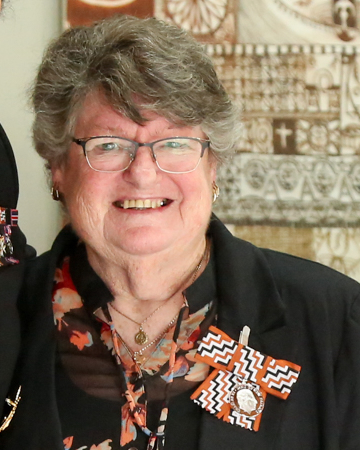
Linda-Lee Odom

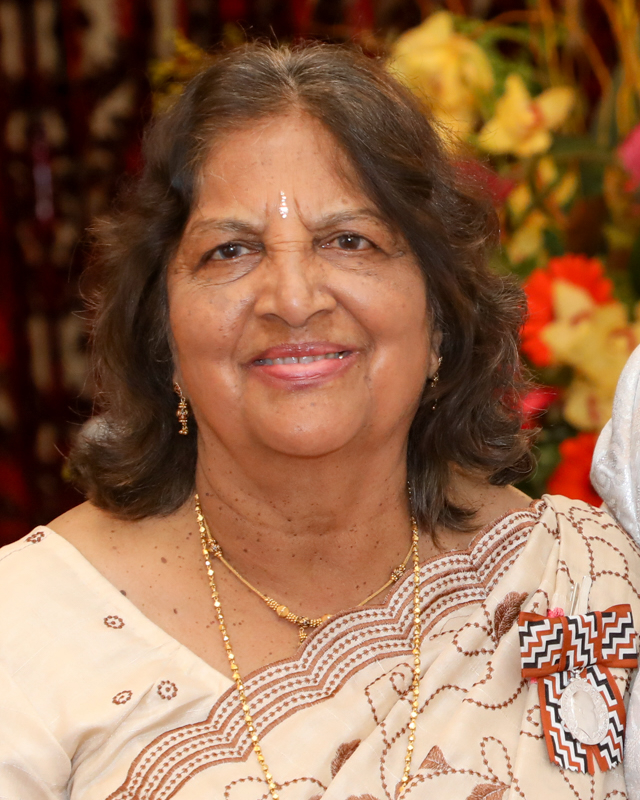
Sharda Patel

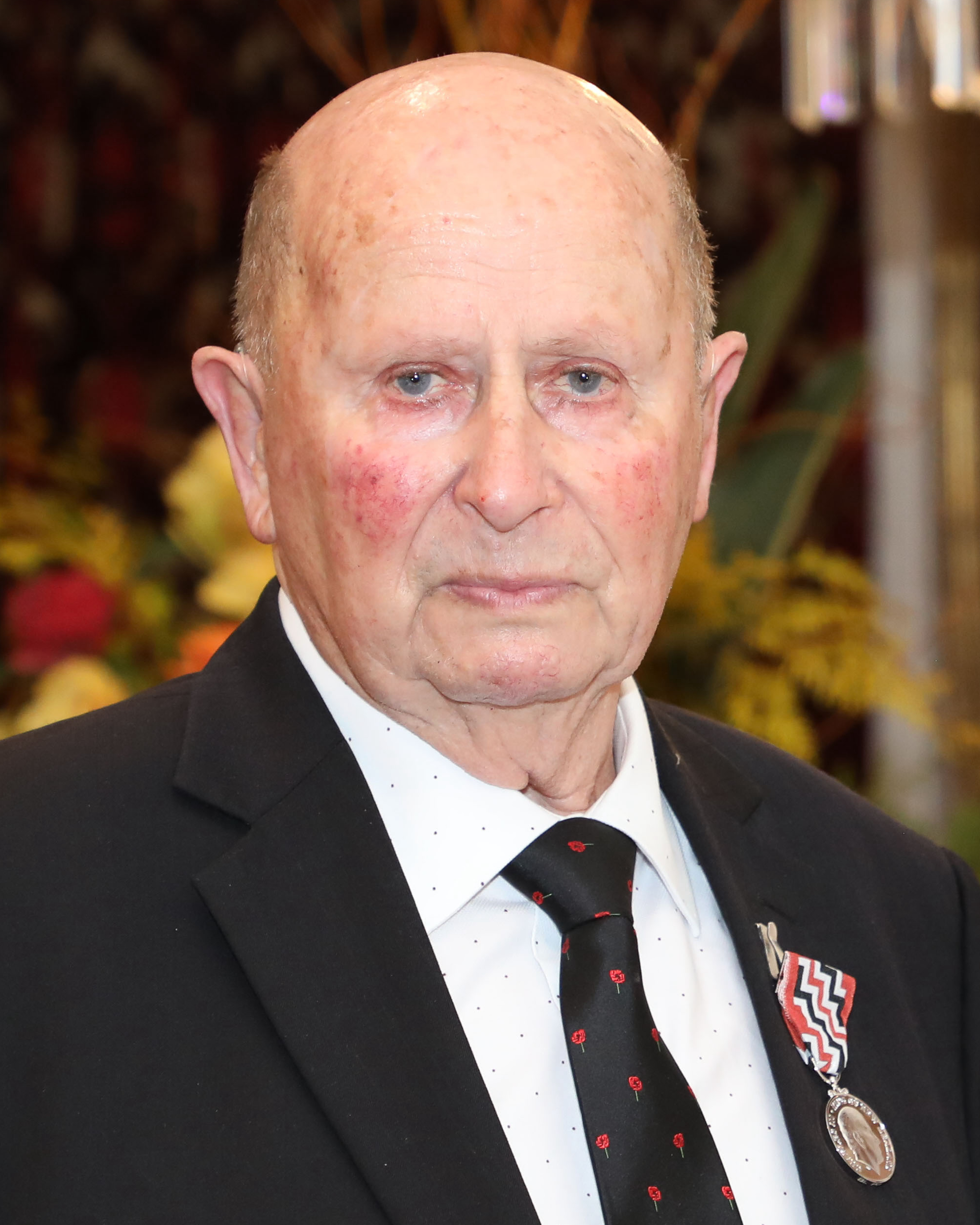
Bernie Power

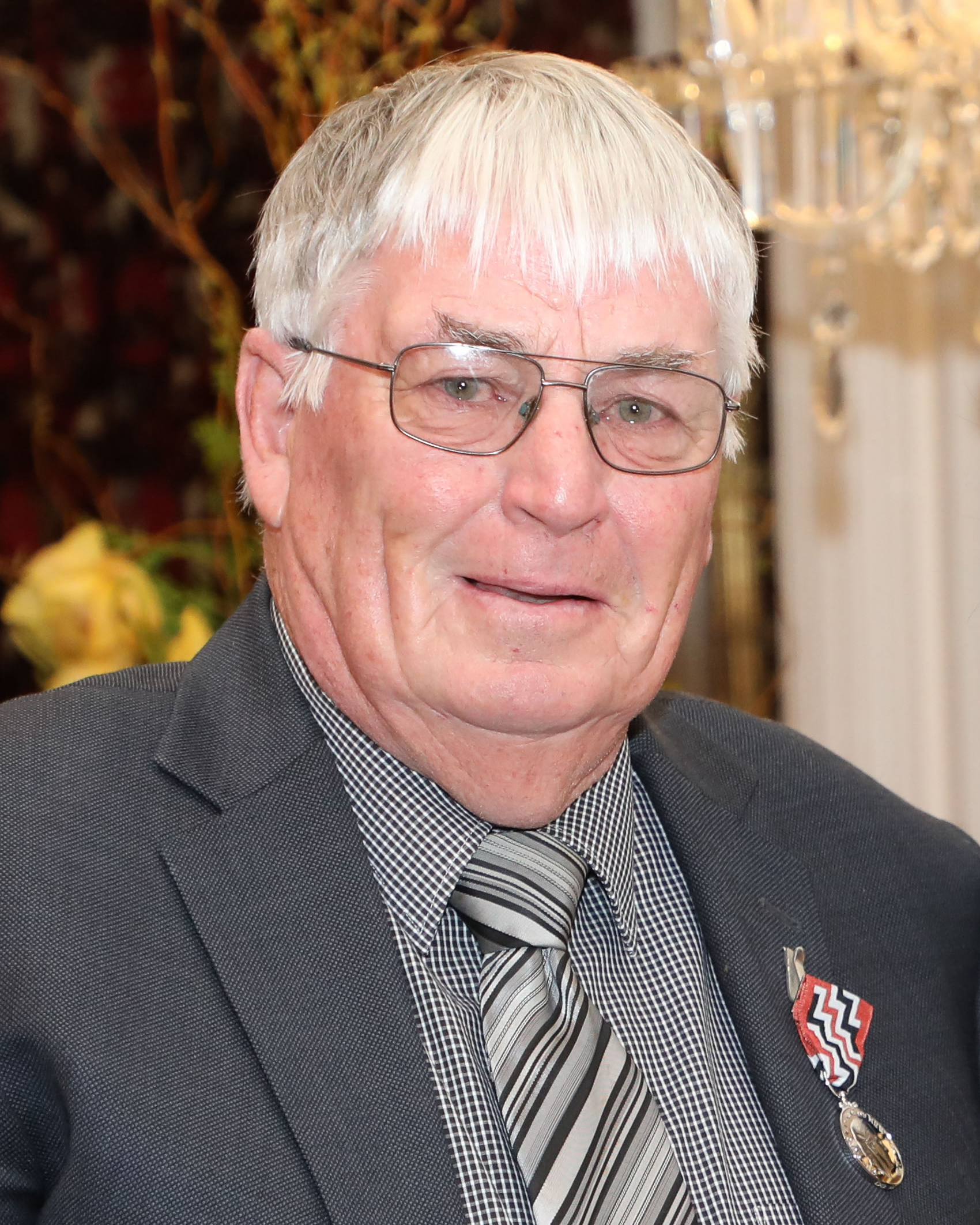
Grant Smith

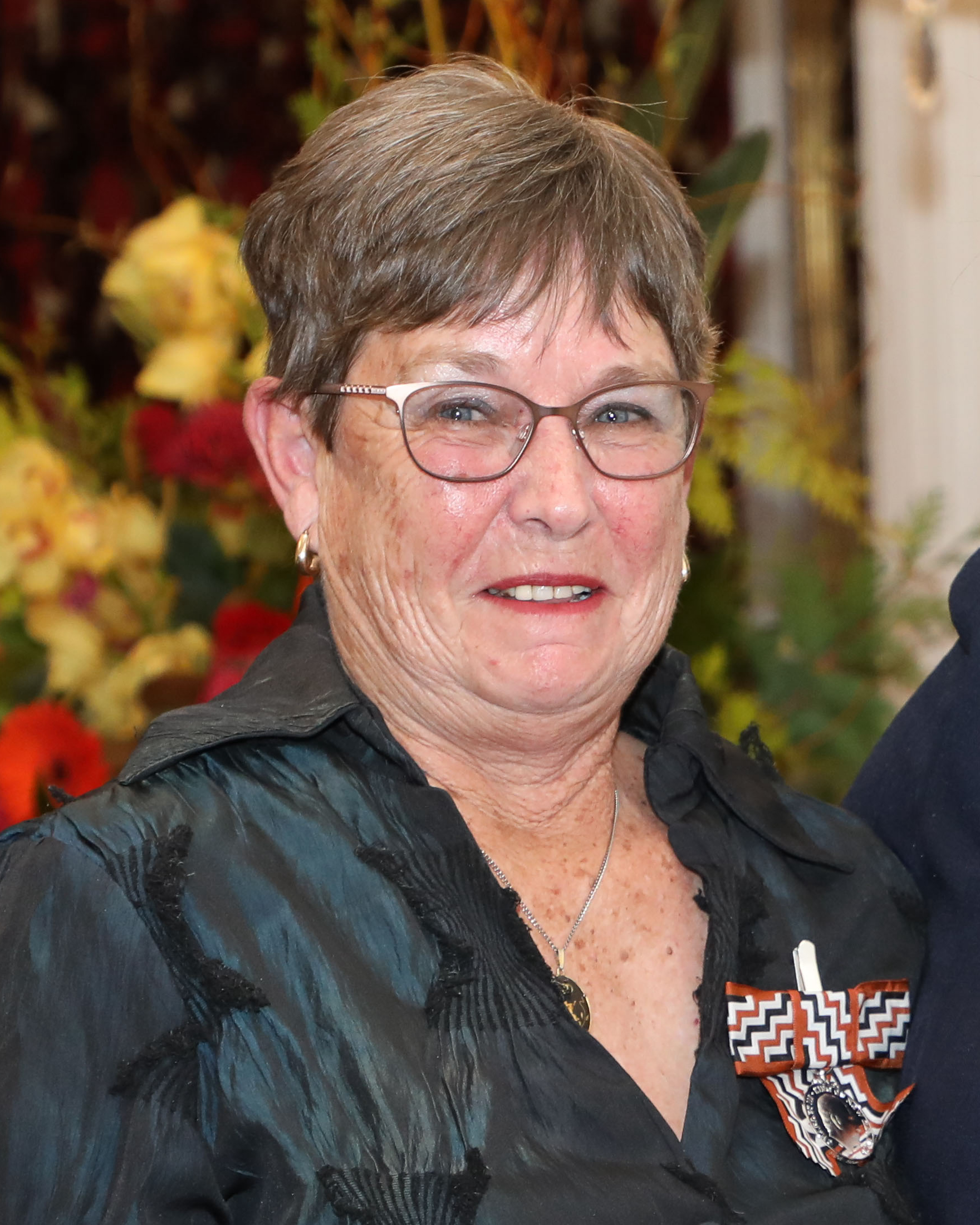
Heather Smith

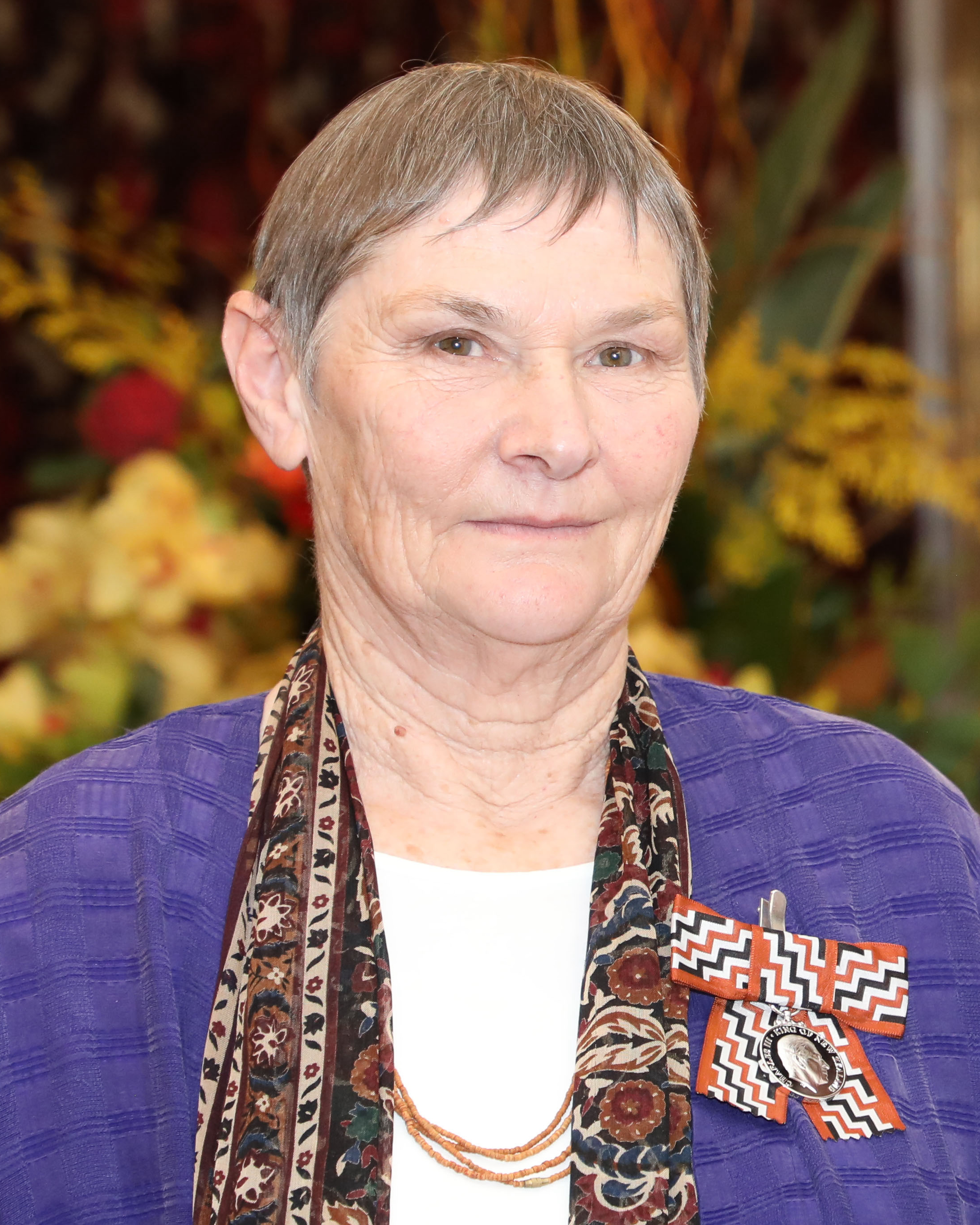
Jill Spicer

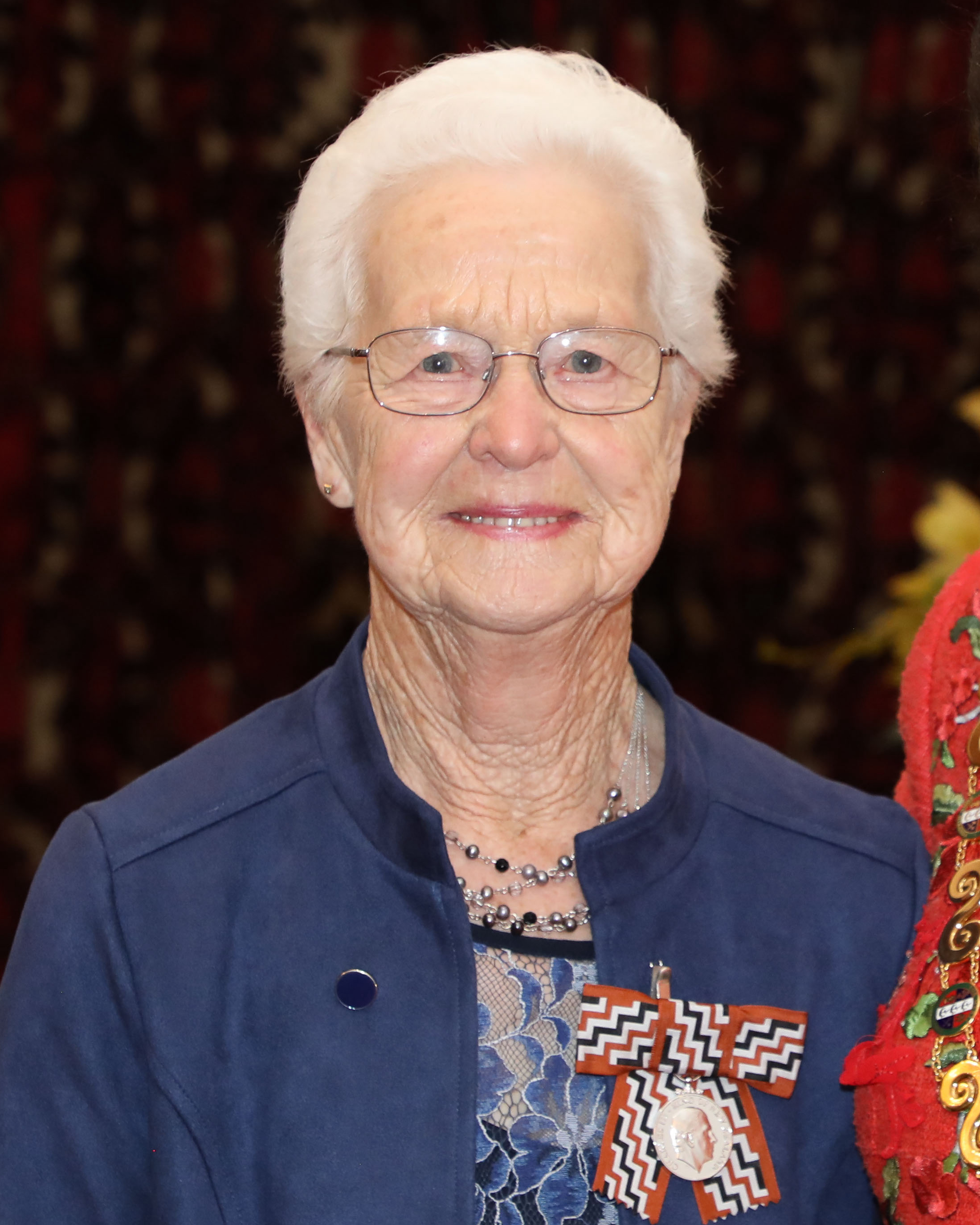
Fay Taylor

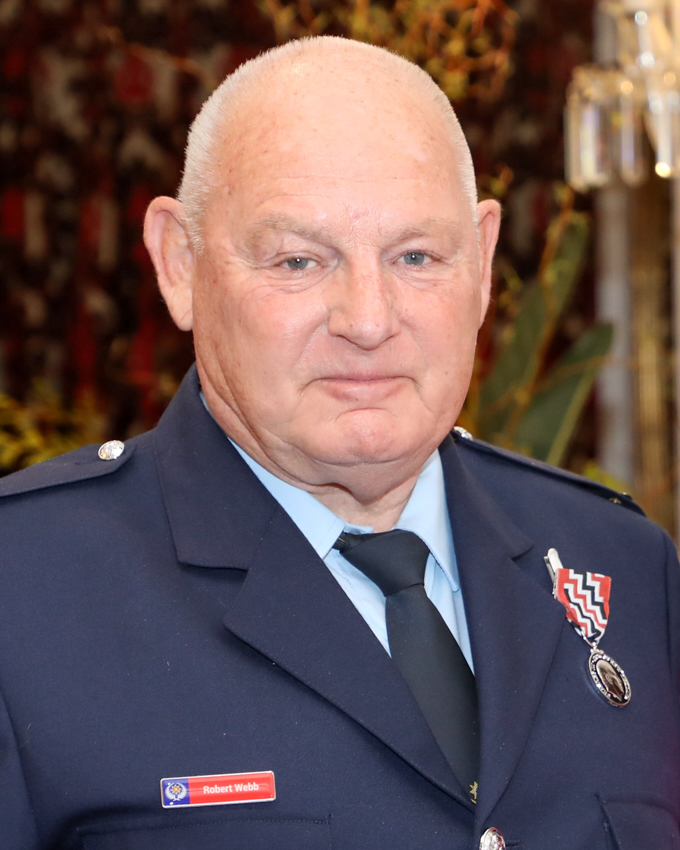
Rob Webb

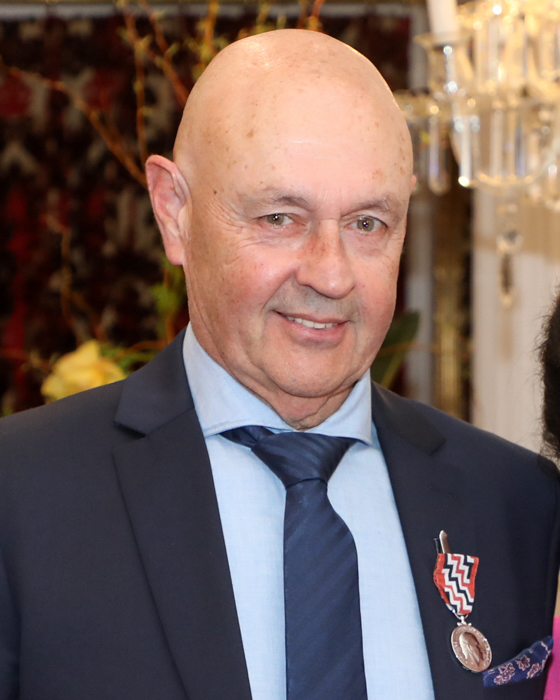
Glenn Williams

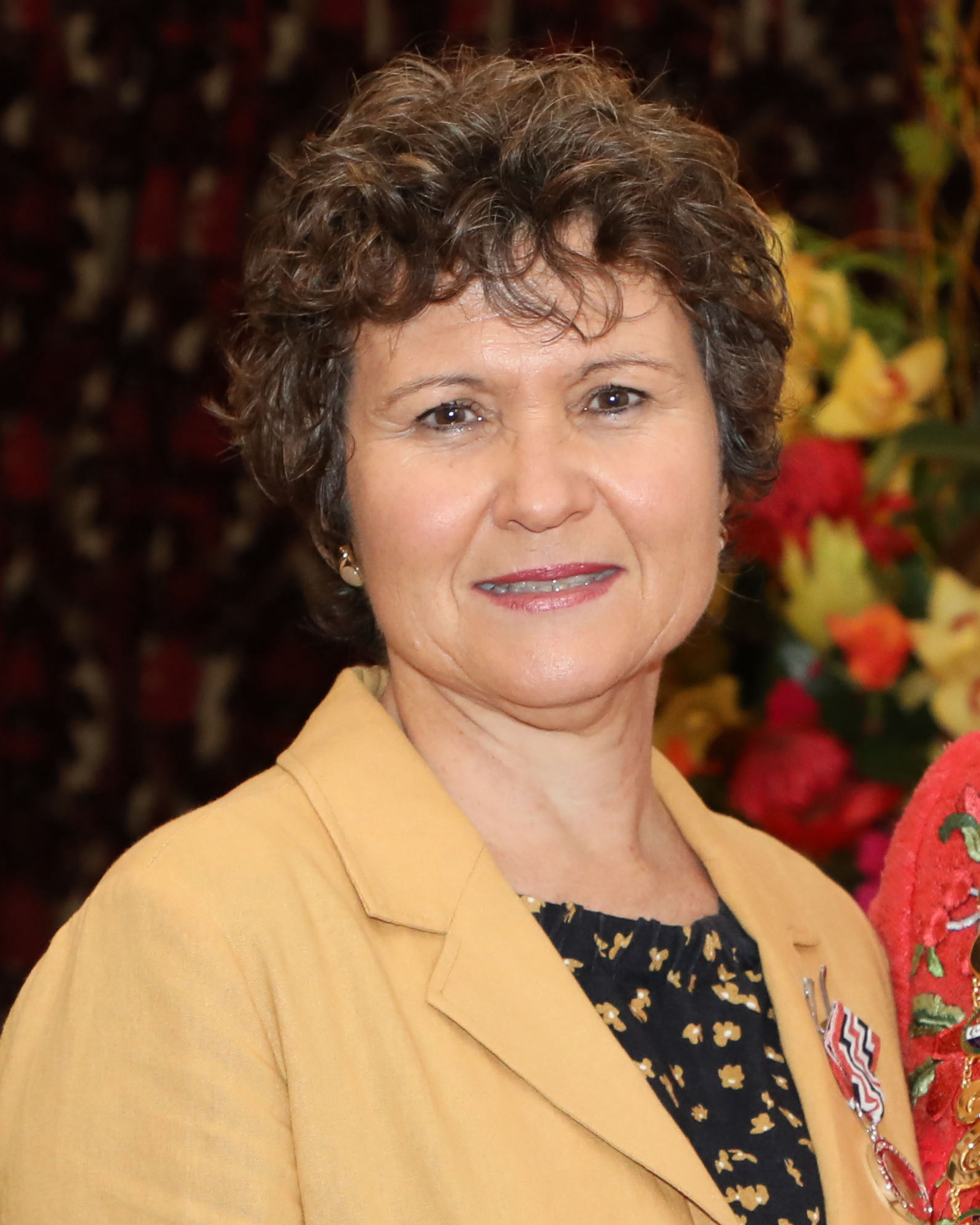
Vicki Wood

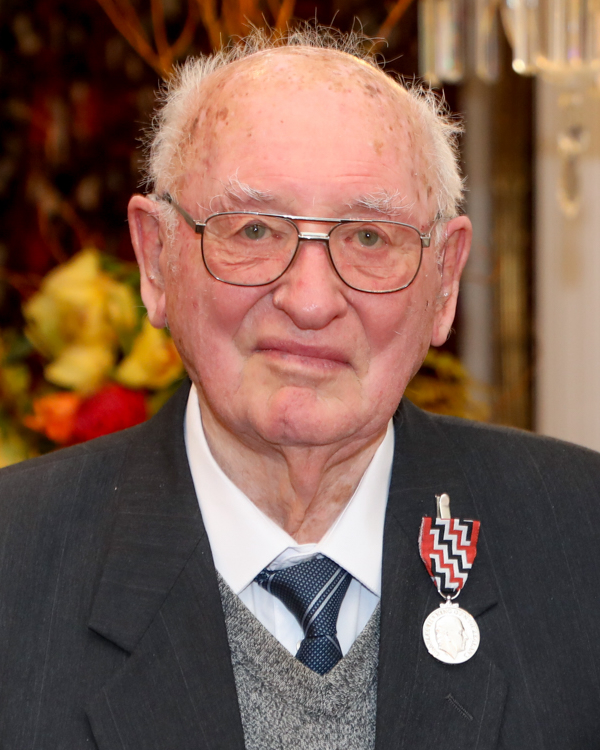
Joseph Zawada

== New Zealand Distinguished Service Decoration (DSD) ==
- Wing Commander Mark Alan Whiteside – of Feilding. For services to the New Zealand Defence Force.
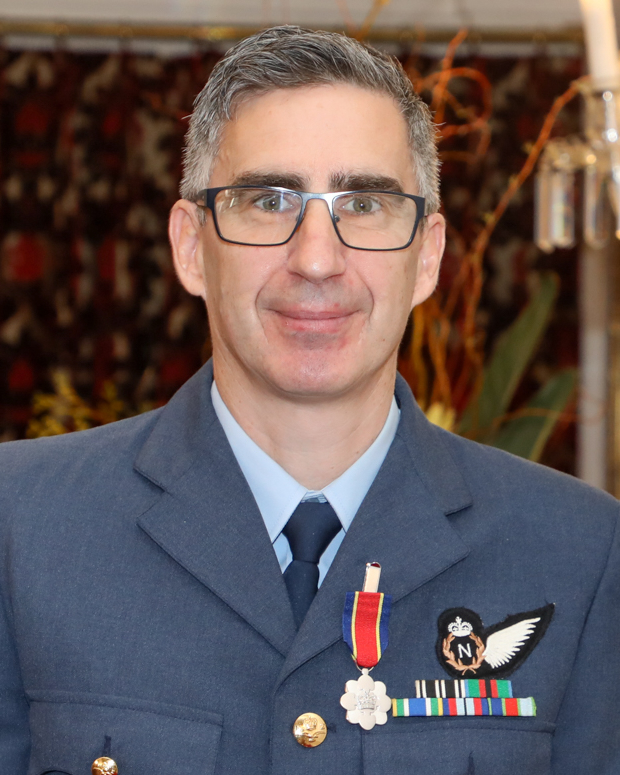
Mark Whiteside
