= Statue of Margaret Cruickshank =

Statue in Waimate, New Zealand

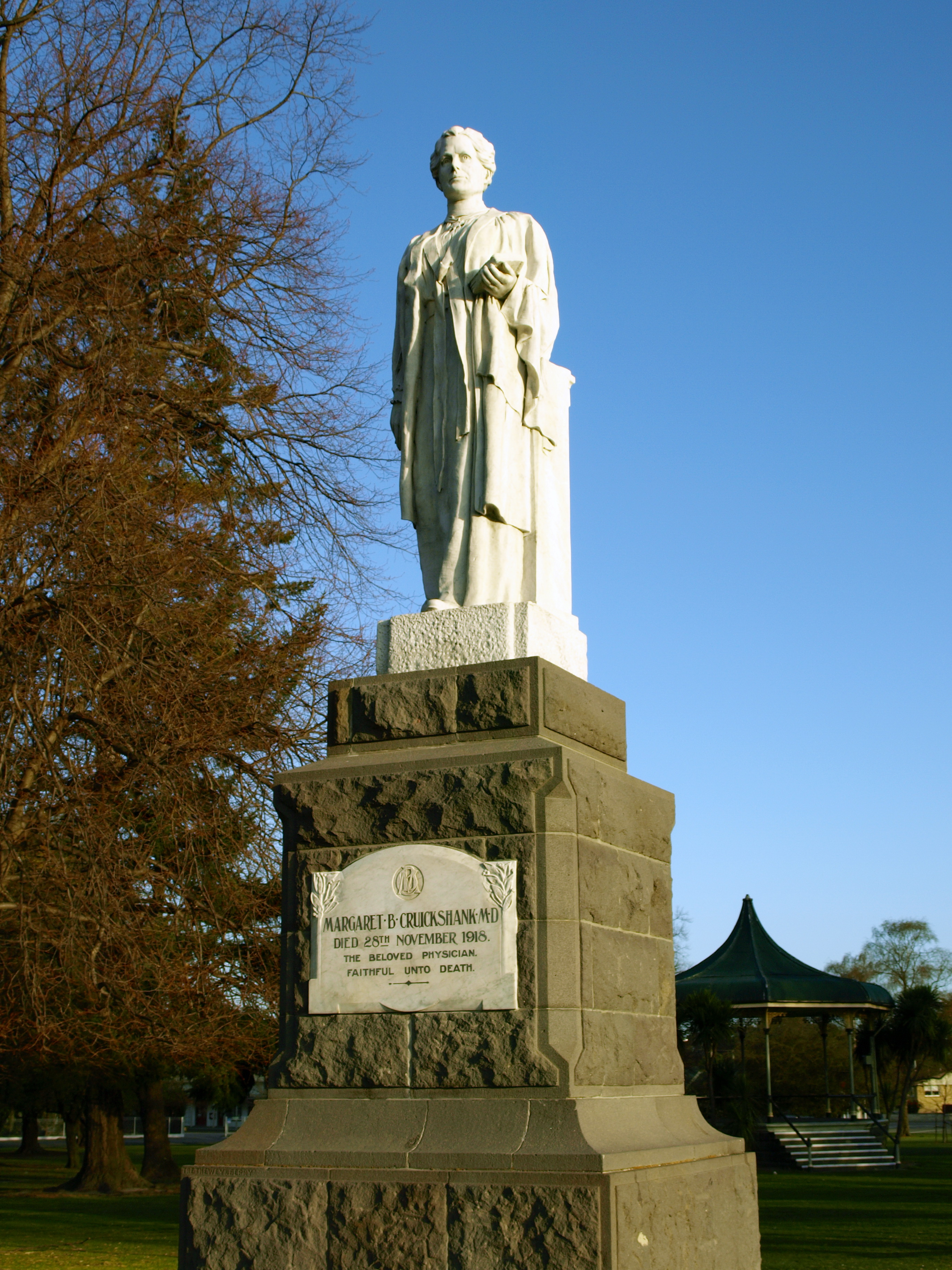
- Artist: William Trethewey
- Year: 1923
- Type: Carrara marble
- Location: Waimate, New Zealand; 44°44′07″S 171°02′43″E

The Statue of Margaret Cruickshank is located in Seddon Square, in the small rural town of Waimate, New Zealand. It honours the life of Margaret Cruickshank, a local doctor who died in the influenza pandemic of 1918, and was the first monument erected in New Zealand to a woman other than Queen Victoria.

The residents of Waimate approached sculptor William Trethewey, who had worked on a number of war memorials in Christchurch, to design the memorial statue. Trethewey worked from photographs and created a plaster cast which was displayed in a shop window in the town to enable locals to comment on it. He then returned to his workshop in Christchurch to create the sculpture, which he created from Italian Carrara marble. The completed statue measures 3.3 metres tall, and depicts Cruickshank in academic robes, holding a Bible in her left hand. At the base are the words "The Beloved Physician/Faithful unto Death". For many years, a bowl of fresh flowers was placed at the foot of the memorial.

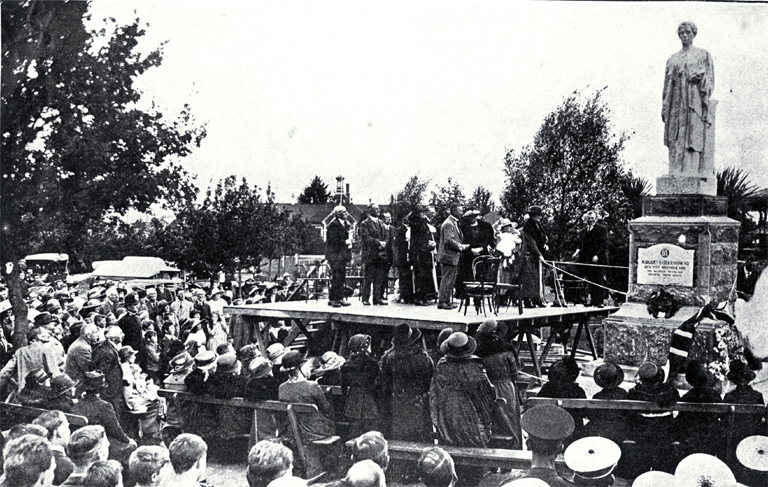
Cruickshank memorial, 1923

The memorial was unveiled on 25 July 1923 at a memorial service for Cruickshank. The speakers at the ceremony included Cruickshank's former classmate Dr Emily Siedeberg, representing the New Zealand Medical Women's Association, the Member of Parliament for Waitaki, John Bitchener, and the chair of the Waimate County Council, Thomas Lawson Hart. Miss M. Allen was also present, as a representative of the Otago University Women's Association. The unveiling was performed by Cruickshank's landlady of 23 years, Mrs Barclay.
