= University of Otago Dunedin School of Medicine =

Medical school in New Zealand

Coordinates: 45.869°S 170.508°E

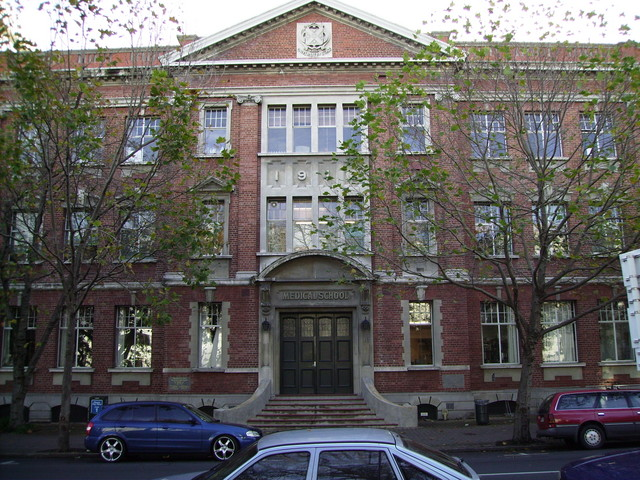
The historic Scott Building, formerly used by the Dunedin School of Medicine, is now used by the School of Biomedical Sciences

The Dunedin School of Medicine is the name of the School of Medicine that is based on the Dunedin campus of the University of Otago in New Zealand. Students who gain entry after the competitive Health Sciences First Year program or who gain graduate entry spend their second and third years (ELM; Early Learning in Medicine) studying at the Otago Medical School in Dunedin. In their fourth, fifth, and sixth years (ALM; Advanced Learning in Medicine), students can either study at the Dunedin School of Medicine (Dunedin), the University of Otago, Christchurch, or the University of Otago, Wellington.

== History ==
Opened in 1875, the Otago Medical School initially taught a two-year course with training completed overseas. 1887 saw the first medical graduate who had been taught solely at Otago. In 1891, the medical school was formally made the Faculty of Medicine. The length of training was extended from five to six years by the dean Lindo Ferguson.

From 1924, students could complete their last year of training at hospitals in either Auckland, Christchurch, or Wellington, as well as Dunedin. In 1937, branch faculties were established in these other centres. Otago's relationship with Auckland ceased after the opening of the University of Auckland School of Medicine in 1968. The branch faculties in Christchurch and Wellington became 'clinical' schools in 1973 and 1977 respectively; the forerunners to the modern University of Otago, Christchurch and University of Otago, Wellington.

=== Women graduates ===
Women did not enter medical training until 1891 when Emily Siedeberg became the first female medical student. Between 1896 and 1924 there were 50 women graduates; by 1949 200 women had graduated. Some of the women graduates between 1896 and 1929 were:

- 1896: Emily Siedeberg
- 1897: Margaret Cruickshank
- 1900: Constance Frost, Daisy Platts-Mills, Alice Horsley
- 1903: Eleanor Baker McLaglan
- 1906: Ada Paterson
- 1916: Doris Gordon
- 1918: Marion King Bennie Cameron
- 1921: Moana Gow, Eva Hill, Sylvia Chapman
- 1922: Muriel Bell
- 1923: Eily Elaine Gurr, Kathleen Todd
- 1924: Mary Champtaloup
- 1925: Cecily Pickerill, Helen Deem
- 1926: Nina Muir, Theodora Hall, Felicia Walmsley
- 1929: Kathleen Pih–Chang

== Dunedin School of Medicine ==
The Dunedin School of Medicine is one of eight faculties and schools within the Division of Health Sciences. The other faculties and schools within the University of Otago Division of Health Sciences are the Otago Medical School (home to the Otago Medical Programme and the Early Learning in Medicine programme); School of Biomedical Sciences; Faculty of Dentistry; School of Pharmacy; School of Physiotherapy; University of Otago, Christchurch; and University of Otago, Wellington.

== Departments ==
The Dunedin School of Medicine is structured into eight academic departments: Bioethics, Primary Health Care, Medicine, Pathology, Public Health, Psychological Medicine, Surgical Sciences, and Women's and Children's Health. Most of these departments have a number of sub-sections or units. It also comprises and administrative department the Dean's Department.

== Buildings ==
The bulk of the Dunedin Medical School is centred on a group of buildings to the southwest of the main University of Otago Campus, in an area including Dunedin Hospital and bounded by George Street, Hanover Street, Cumberland Street, and Frederick Street. These include the Hercus Building (Department of Pathology), the Adams Building (Department of Public Health), and the Fraser Building (Department of Psychological Medicine). Other parts of the school are located within Dunedin Hospital, most notably the Colquhoun and Barnett lecture theatres, the Dean's Department, and the Departments of Medicine, Surgical Sciences, and Women's and Children's Health. The Department of Primary Health Care is located at 310 Castle Street. The Bioethics Centre is housed in 71 Frederick St.

Near the heart of the Dunedin School of Medicine, located alongside the Hercus and Adams buildings, are the Scott and Lindo Ferguson Buildings, both listed by Heritage New Zealand as Category II and Category I respectively. The Scott Building, built during the First World War by the architectural firm of Mason & Wales, is now used by the School of Biomedical Sciences. The imposing Lindo Ferguson Building is an Oamaru Stone and brick structure in classical styling built in 1927 to a design by Edmund Anscombe, also used by the School of Biomedical Sciences. It was named for Sir Lindo Ferguson, Dean of the Otago Medical School from 1914 to 1937.

== Gallery ==
Medical School historic buildings

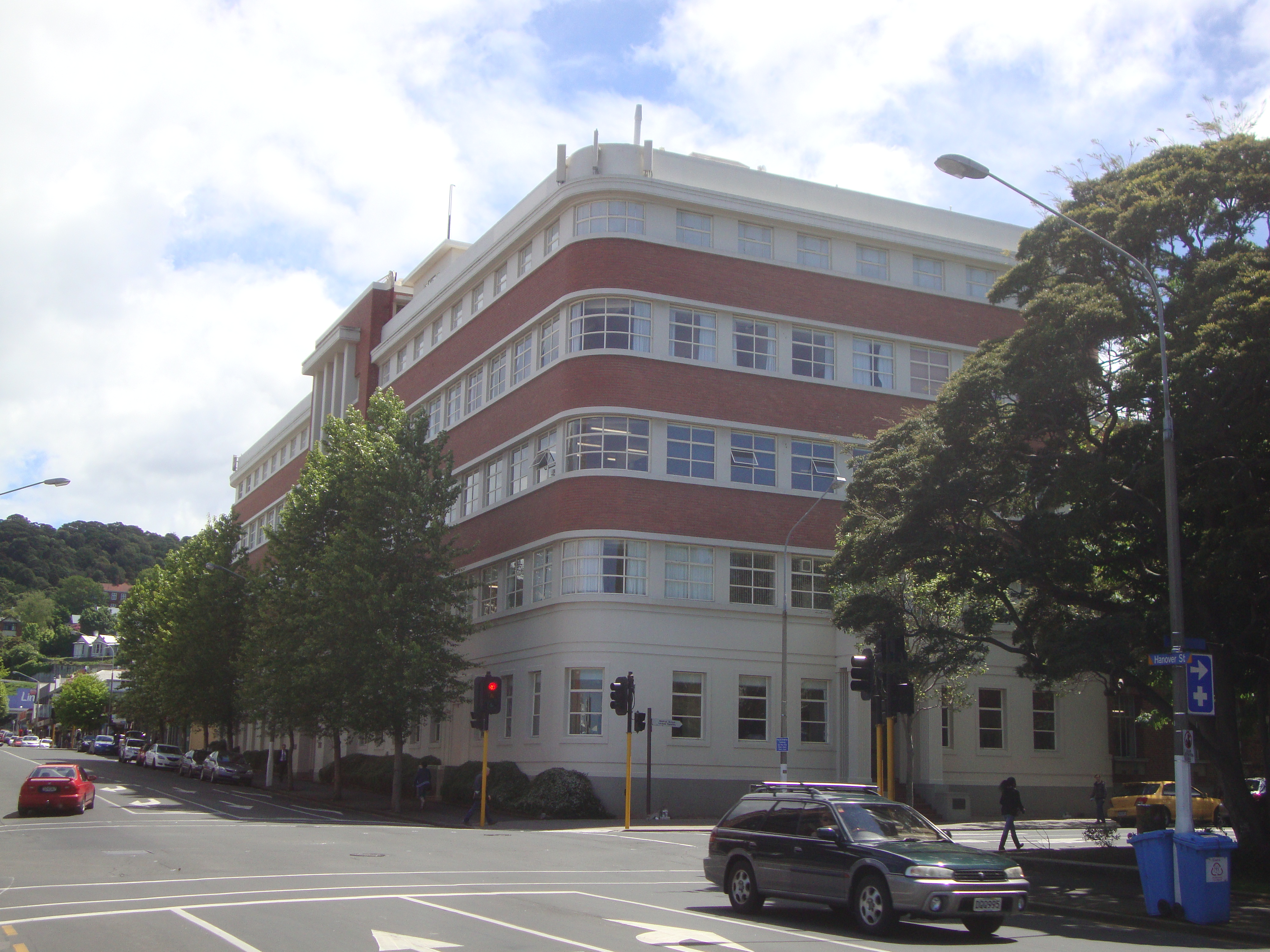
Hercus Building, 2012

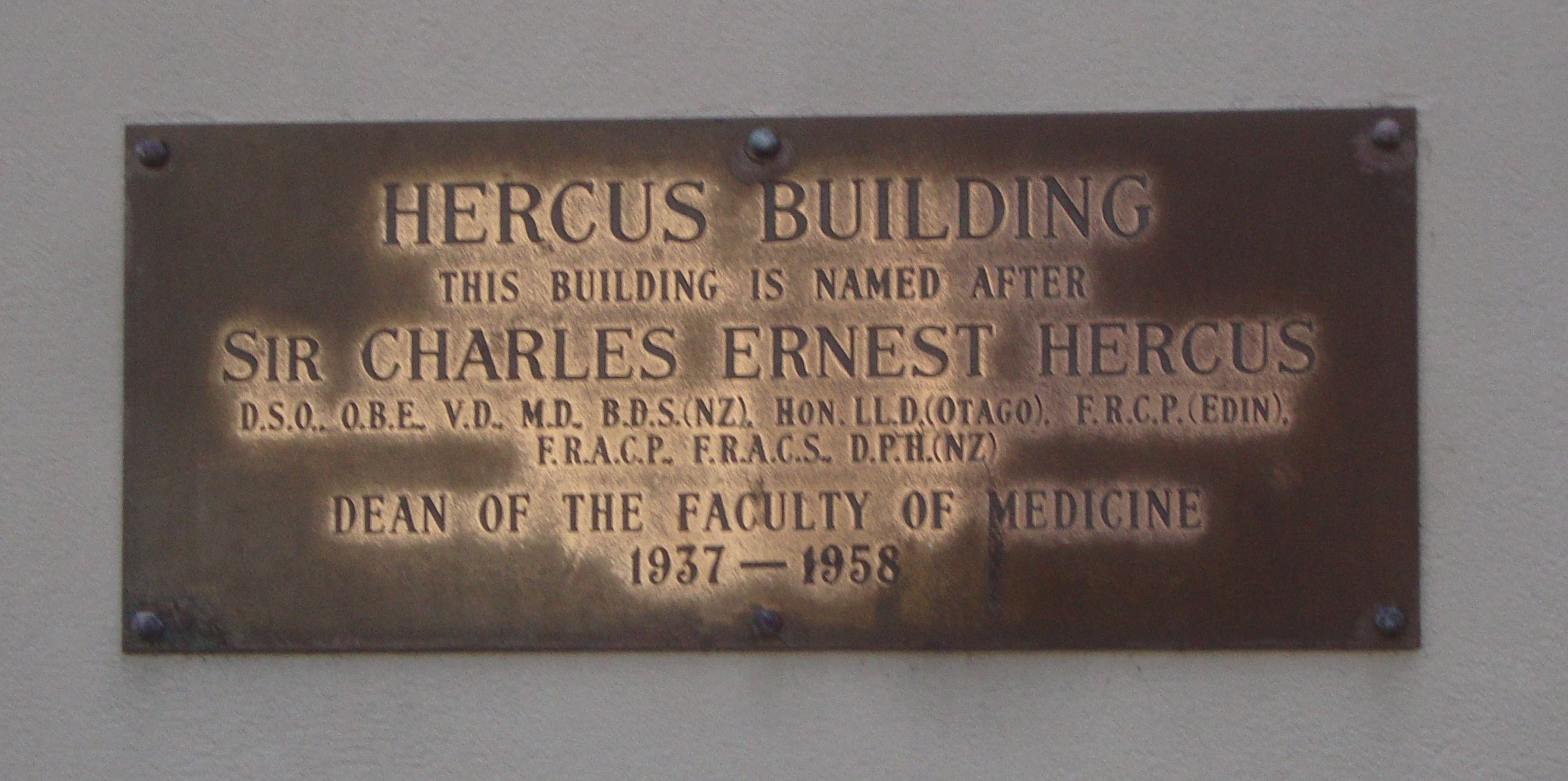
Plaque in memory of Sir Charles Hercus

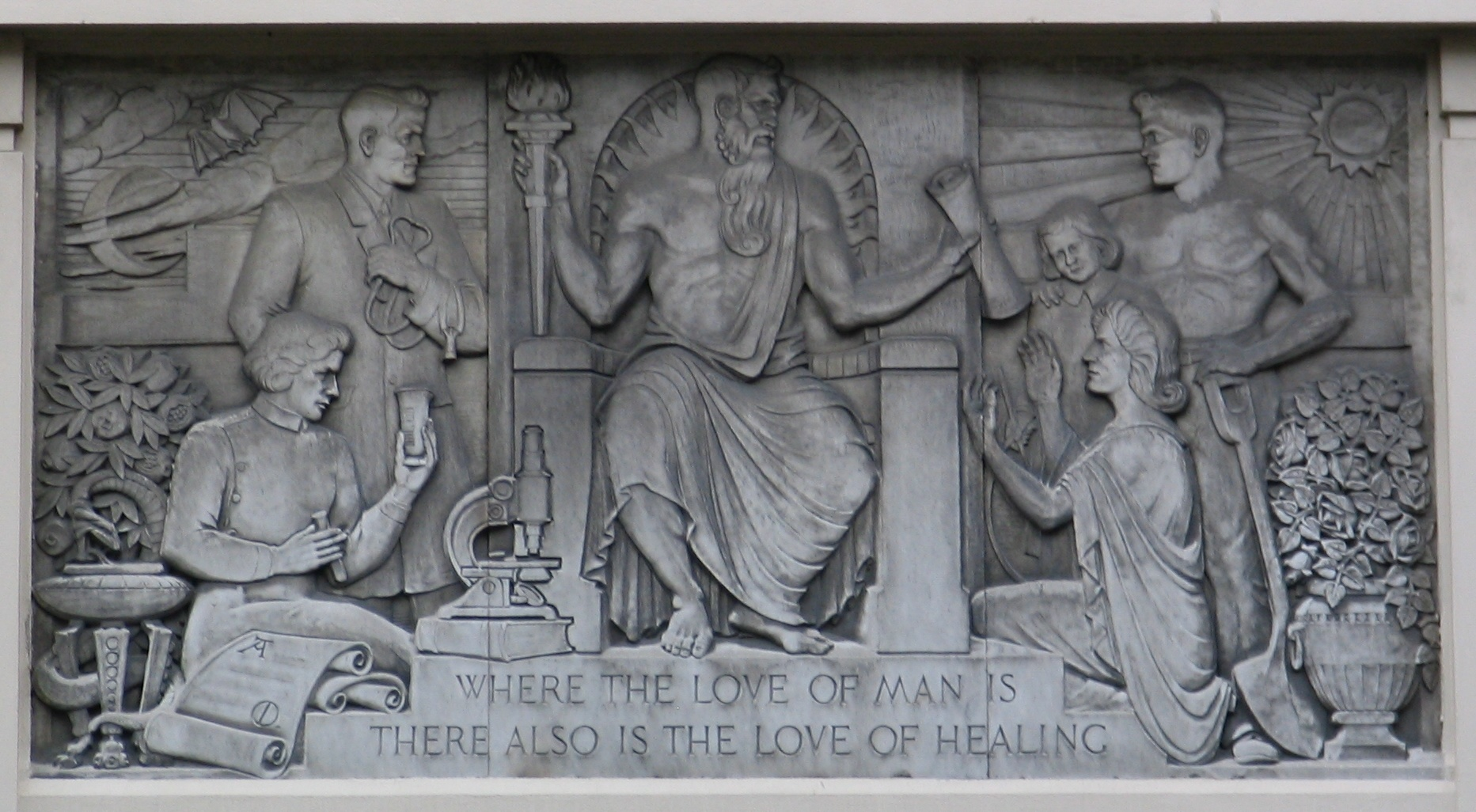
Hercus Building, carving by Richard Gross over entrance

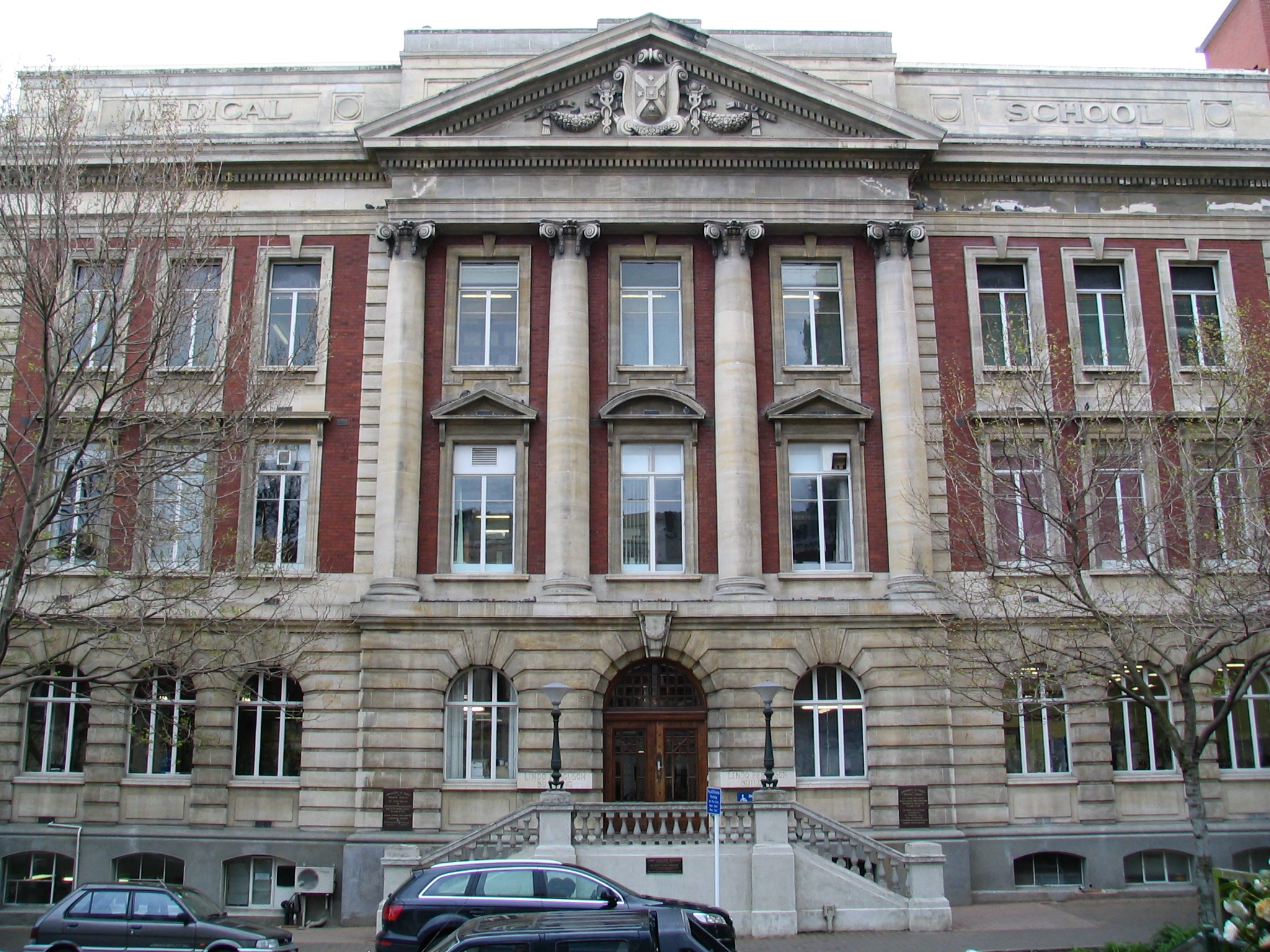
Lindo Ferguson Building, 2009

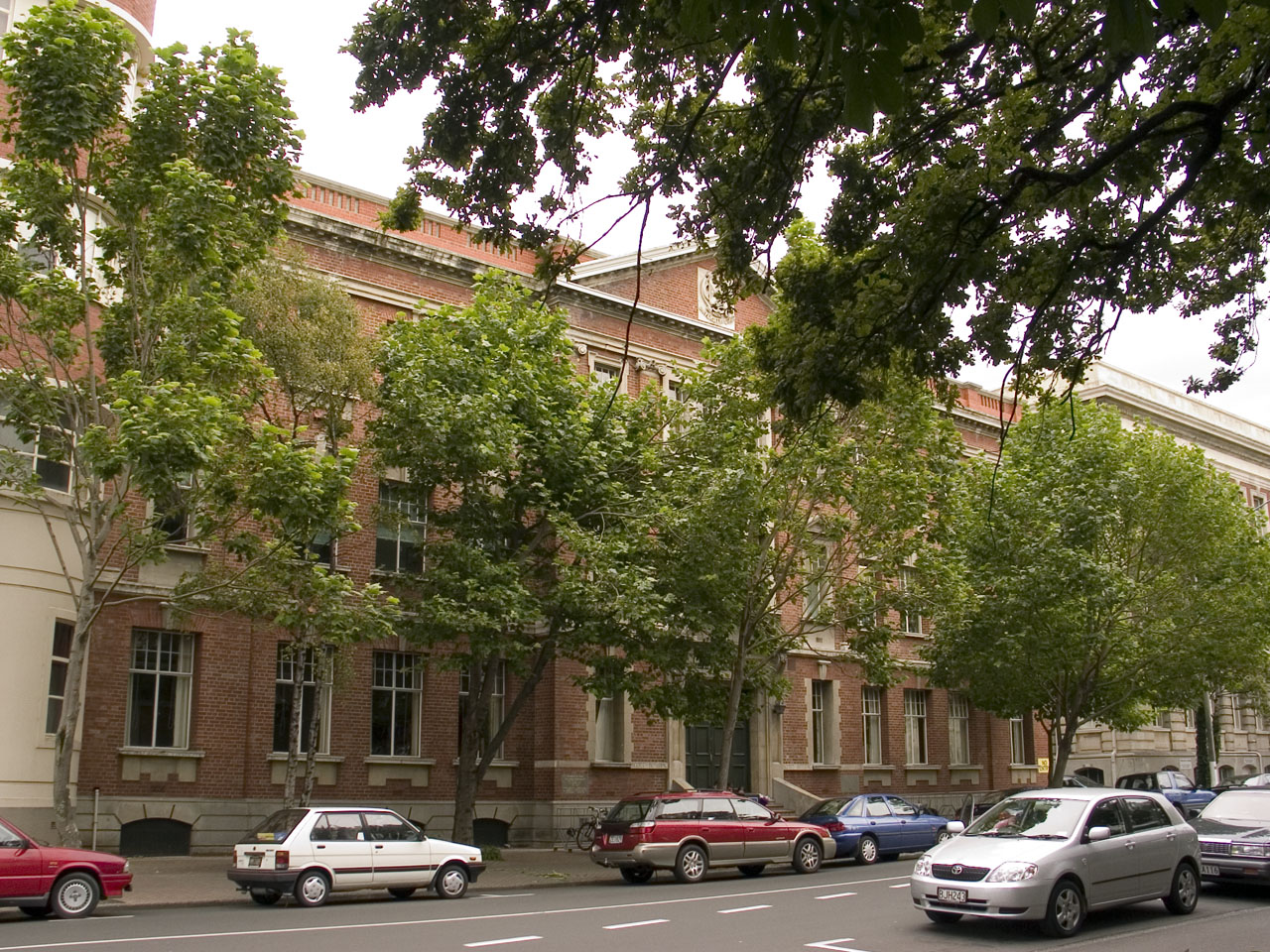
Scott Building, 2005
