= Florence Keller =

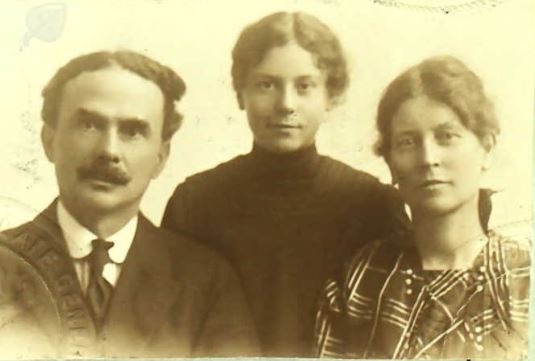
- Florence Keller (right), with her husband Peter and daughter Frances. Passport application photo, 1919
- Born: Nettie Florence Armstrong; March 18, 1875; Carthage, Missouri, U.S.
- Died: January 15, 1974 (aged 98); Los Angeles, U.S.
- Education: Walla Walla College; American Medical Missionary College
- Occupations: Doctor; social reformer; feminist; prohibitionist
- Spouse: Peter Martin Keller (m. 1901; died 1931)
- Children: 1
- Medical career
- Institutions: University of Auckland

Nettie Florence Keller (née Armstrong; 18 March 1875 – 15 January 1974) was an American doctor, social reformer, feminist, prohibitionist and early vegan. Keller was a member of the Seventh-day Adventist Church.

== Biography ==
Nettie Florence Armstrong was born in Carthage, Missouri, on March 18, 1875. Her family later moved to Arkansas, before settling in Washington, where she studied at Walla Walla College, which her father helped construct.

She later studied medicine at the American Medical Missionary College in Battle Creek, Michigan, where she met Māui Pōmare and her future husband Peter Martin Keller. Peter Keller went to Australia to work on behalf of the Seventh Day Adventist Church. Florence graduated in 1900 and later joined Peter, becoming the first Seventh Day Adventist female doctor to be sent overseas. The couple married in Christchurch, New Zealand on 13 August 1901. When Seventh Day Adventist medical institutions in Australia became overstaffed, the General Conference asked the Kellers to make room for the older doctors by entering private practice. The Kellers worked as locums in various parts of Australia, then moved to Huntly, New Zealand, in 1903. In 1906 the couple returned to Washington to ensure American citizenship for their daughter Frances, their only child.

Later they set up in private practice in Auckland. While in New Zealand Florence Keller became an outspoken campaigner for many health-related issues including the temperance movement, the rational dress movement, improvements to prevention and treatment of tuberculosis and support of sunbathing as a healthy activity. She was invited to join the faculty at the Auckland University College and taught hygiene and health principles. Keller was also appointed to the Board of Governors of Auckland Hospital, a position she held from 1913–1921.

In 1913 she was elected as a member of the Auckland Hospital Board as an independent candidate. She was re-elected for three further terms on the Labour Party ticket where she "topped the poll", receiving more votes than any other candidate. Keller was instrumental in arranging an honorarium to be paid to Constance Frost, the bacteriologist at Auckland Hospital.

The Kellers returned to the United States permanently in late 1919 after about twenty years in New Zealand and worked at the College of Medical Evangelists in Los Angeles. Peter and Florence began the Departments of Obstetrics and Gynecology, respectively. In 1923, Peter Keller took over a post at the Glendale Sanitarium which he held until 1931, when he was fatally shot by an insane patient. Florence Keller remained at the College of Medical Evangelists and became emeritus professor of gynecology there in 1941.

She died soon before her 99th birthday, on January 15, 1974, in Los Angeles.

== Surgery ==
A fellow of the International and American College of Surgeons, Keller was known mainly as a surgeon in the later part of her life. One notable operation quite early in her career, in 1919, was an appendectomy performed on board a ship at sea in the Pacific. The engineer's mess room was used as an operating theatre and surgical instruments were sterilised in the ship's galley. Keller was still doing surgery and seeing patients six days a week until she was 92.

== Veganism ==
Keller was an early vegan who argued against vegetarians consuming dairy and egg products. She commented that "I don't allow that anybody who touches animal products at all, even eggs, butter and milk, can claim to be a vegetarian."
