= 1924 New Year Honours (New Zealand) =

Annual awards for New Zealanders

The 1924 New Year Honours in New Zealand were appointments as Knight Bachelor by King George V, on the advice of the New Zealand government, to reward and highlight good works by two New Zealanders. The awards celebrated the passing of 1923 and the beginning of 1924, and were announced on 1 January 1924.

The recipients of honours are displayed here as they were styled before their new honour.

== Knight Bachelor ==
- Henry Lindo Ferguson CMG MD – of Dunedin; dean of the Faculty of Medicine, University of Otago.
- The Honourable Arthur Mielziner Myers – of Auckland; formerly minister of customs and munitions and for many years member of the House of Representatives. In recognition of his public services.
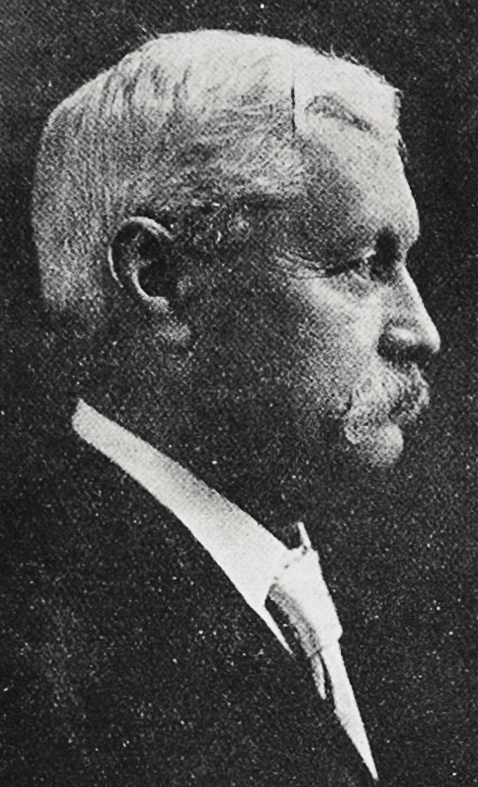
Sir Lindo Ferguson

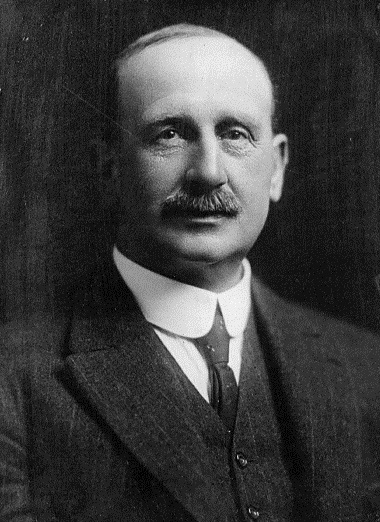
Sir Arthur Myers
