= Phillippa Poole =

New Zealand medical researcher

Phillippa Poole ONZM
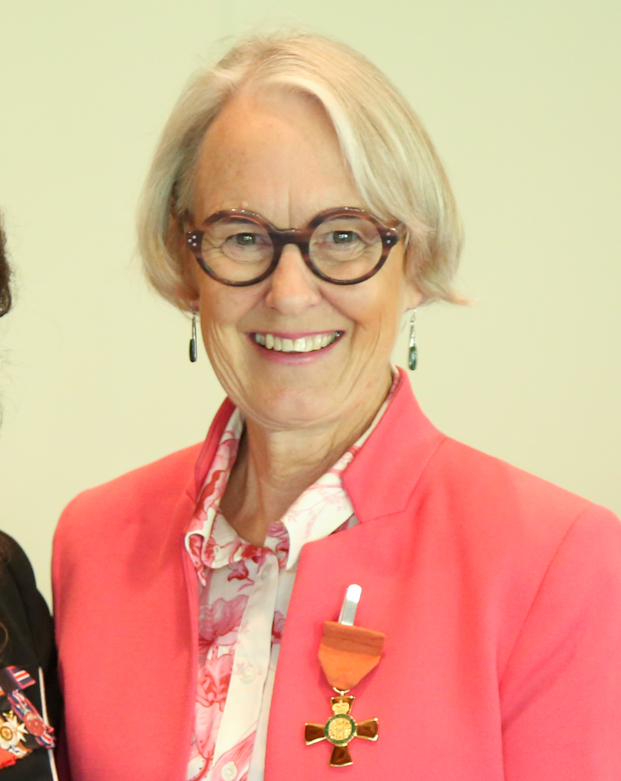
- Poole in 2025
- Education: University of Auckland
- Scientific career
- Fields: Medical education
- Workplaces: University of Auckland
- Thesis: Medical workforce development in New Zealand: insights from a medical programme (2010)

Phillippa Jane Poole ONZM is a New Zealand academic, and as of 2019 is a full professor and Head of School at the University of Auckland; she was previously head of the medical programme.

== Academic career ==
After studying medicine at the University of Auckland, Poole joined the staff, rising to full professor. She was Head of the Medical Programme from 1999–2009, then Head of the Department of Medicine, becoming Head of the School of Medicine in 2018. Poole divides her time between academic duties and being a consultant general physician at Auckland City Hospital. She is a past president of the Internal Medicine Society of Australia and New Zealand. In 2010 Poole completed a late-career PhD entitled Medical workforce development in New Zealand: insights from a medical programme.

== Research ==
Poole's research is focussed on the career choices students make in medical school, and the effect of gender on them. One of her findings has been a lack of medical students interested in taking up general practice (something an ageing population will require) and the suggestion that female doctors are more likely to switch to family medicine later in their careers. She is also involved with Cochrane reviews of the treatment of chronic obstructive pulmonary disease.

== Personal life ==
Poole is married with a daughter and lives in Devonport.

== Honours and awards ==
In the 2024 King’s Birthday Honours, Poole was appointed an Officer of the New Zealand Order of Merit, for services to medical education.

== Selected works ==
- Poole, Phillipa., Stoner, T., Verstappen, A., & Bagg, W. (2016). "Medical students: where have they come from; where are they going?". New Zealand Medical Journal 129 (1435): 59–67.
- Poole, Phillippa, Boaz Shulruf, Ben Harley, John Monigatti, Mark Barrow, Mary-Jane Reid, Caitlin Prendergast, and Warwick Bagg. (2012). "Shedding light on the decision to retain an interview for medical student selection." The New Zealand Medical Journal 125 (1361).
- Braatvedt, Claire, Phillippa Poole, Alan Merry, Desmond Gorman, Mary-Jane Reid, and Warwick Bagg. (2014). "Fitness to practice of medical graduates: one programme’s approach." The New Zealand Medical Journal 127 (1405).
- Eaton, Tam, Pam Young, Wendy Fergusson, Lisa Moodie, Irene Zeng, Fiona O'Kane, Nichola Good, Leanne Rhodes, Phillippa Poole, and John Kolbe. (2009). "Does early pulmonary rehabilitation reduce acute health‐care utilization in COPD patients admitted with an exacerbation? A randomized controlled study." Respirology 14 (2): 230–238.
