= Alice Horsley =

New Zealand doctor (1871–1957)

Alice Horsley OBE
- Born: Alice Woodward; 3 February 1871; Auckland, New Zealand
- Died: 7 November 1957 (aged 86); Papatoetoe, New Zealand
- Education: University of Otago Medical School
- Occupation: General practitioner
- Medical career
- Field: Anaesthetics, midwifery, general practice

Alice Woodward Horsley OBE (née Woodward; 3 February 1871 – 7 November 1957) was a New Zealand medical doctor and the first woman to be a registered medical doctor in Auckland.

== Early life and education ==
Horsley was born in Auckland, New Zealand, on 3 February 1871, to Laura née Young, a schoolteacher, and William Woodward, a farmer who had also been a teacher. Horsley left school and 13 and was educated at home after that. After extra tuition from friends of the family in Latin and chemistry, she was able to enrol to study medicine in 1894 at the University of Otago. When Horsley graduated alongside Constance Frost, Daisy Platts and Jane Kinder in 1900, only two women had previously gained medical degrees in New Zealand, Emily Siedeberg and Margaret Cruickshank.

== Career ==
Horsley moved to Auckland after graduation taking up a position as a house surgeon at Auckland Hospital in 1899. She was the first woman doctor registered in Auckland and the first woman employed at Auckland Hospital, where she held a position as honorary bacteriologist and pathologist, until Constance Frost was appointed. She was also an anaesthestist at the hospital from 1902 until 1947.

After her house surgeon years she established a private practice in rooms on Queen Street above a chemist. There she met Arthur John Horsley through his work as an apprentice pharmacist downstairs from her practice. They were married on 9 December 1903 at St James' Anglican Church, Māngere.

In 1917 the couple moved to Symonds Street, where Horsley practised for approximately 40 years from a surgery attached to the family home. With four children, running a house and medical practice was difficult. She was known to sometimes ring home during administration of an anaesthetic to ask someone to turn the jam off, and her children recalled completing homework in the back of the car while she attended patients.

From 1936 to 1946, she was an anaesthetist at the Mater Misericordiae Hospital, and worked privately for surgeons including Sir Carrick Robertson and James Hardie Neil.

Horsley's humanitarian values led her to treat some patients free of charge, and sometimes donate money to patients. She also took on unmarried mothers as domestic help. Horsley served as an anaesthetist in the Military Hospital during WWI. Horsley worked throughout the plague scare of 1900 and the 1918 influenza epidemic, and was a member of the medical relief team after the Hawke's Bay earthquake of 1931, in which hundreds were killed and thousands injured.

During the economic depression of the 1930s, Horsley became the regular doctor for the non-denominational Dock Street Mission medical clinic, which had been opened to serve patients who could not afford to pay for medical care. Her dedication to the mission led to her appointment as OBE in 1939.

Horsley died in Papatoetoe on 7 November 1957. She was survived by three daughters and a son; her husband had died in 1950.

== Honours ==
In the 1939 New Year Honours, Horsley was appointed an Officer of the Order of the British Empire, for social welfare services. In 2017, Horsley was selected as one of the Royal Society Te Apārangi's 150 women in 150 words, celebrating the contributions of women to knowledge in New Zealand.
