= Lindo Ferguson (ophthalmologist, born 1858) =

New Zealand ophthalmologist, university professor, and medical school dean

== Early life and education ==
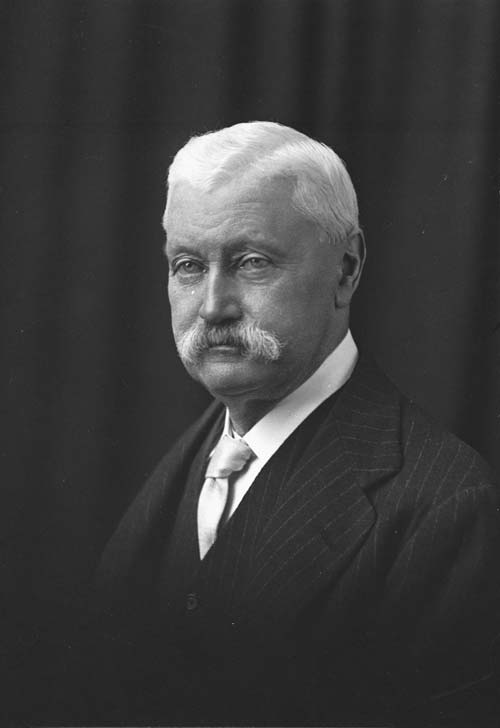
Ferguson while he was dean (1914–1936)

Sir Henry Lindo Ferguson CMG CStJ (7 April 1858 – 22 January 1948), known as Lindo Ferguson, was a New Zealand ophthalmologist, university professor and dean of the University of Otago Medical School.

Ferguson was born in London, England, on 7 April 1858. His parents were Louisa Ann Du Bois and William Ferguson. The family moved from Burton upon Trent, England, to Dublin, Ireland, in 1866.

Ferguson started college in 1873 at the Royal College of Science for Ireland. After earning a scholarship in industrial chemistry, he decided to instead study medicine at the Trinity College Dublin. He earned his medical degree in 1880 and continued his studies, specialising in ophthalmology and gaining his FRCSI in 1883. Because of his ill health he was advised to move to a better climate so he and his mother and brother William emigrated to New Zealand in 1883, choosing Dunedin because of its medical school.

== Career ==
Ferguson became ophthalmologist at Dunedin Hospital in 1884. He was said to be the first ophthalmologist in Australasia though there were other doctors practising ophthalmology. He was the first ophthalmologist to be appointed to a university position becoming a lecturer at the University of Otago in 1886 and professor of ophthalmology in 1909, the first such professorial appointment in Australasia.

In 1914 Ferguson became dean of the medical school, succeeding John Scott and holding the position until 1936. He oversaw changes in and the growth of the medical school. The medical degree was lengthened from five to six years in line with Australian degrees, he increased endowments to the medical school and incorporated the departments of anatomy and physiology into the medical school from than the main university. A new building was built to house these two departments and is called the Lindo Ferguson Building. Designed by Edmund Anscombe in the neo-classical style it opened in 1927 and has a Heritage New Zealand category I status.

Ferguson was active in several other professional activities. In 1896 he became president of the New Zealand Medical Association which wound up in the same year and became the New Zealand Branch of the British Medical Association. In 1920 he was president of the Branch. He was a founding member of three professional organisations: the Ophthalmological Society of Great Britain, the Royal Academy of Medicine of Ireland and the Royal Australasian College of Surgeons.

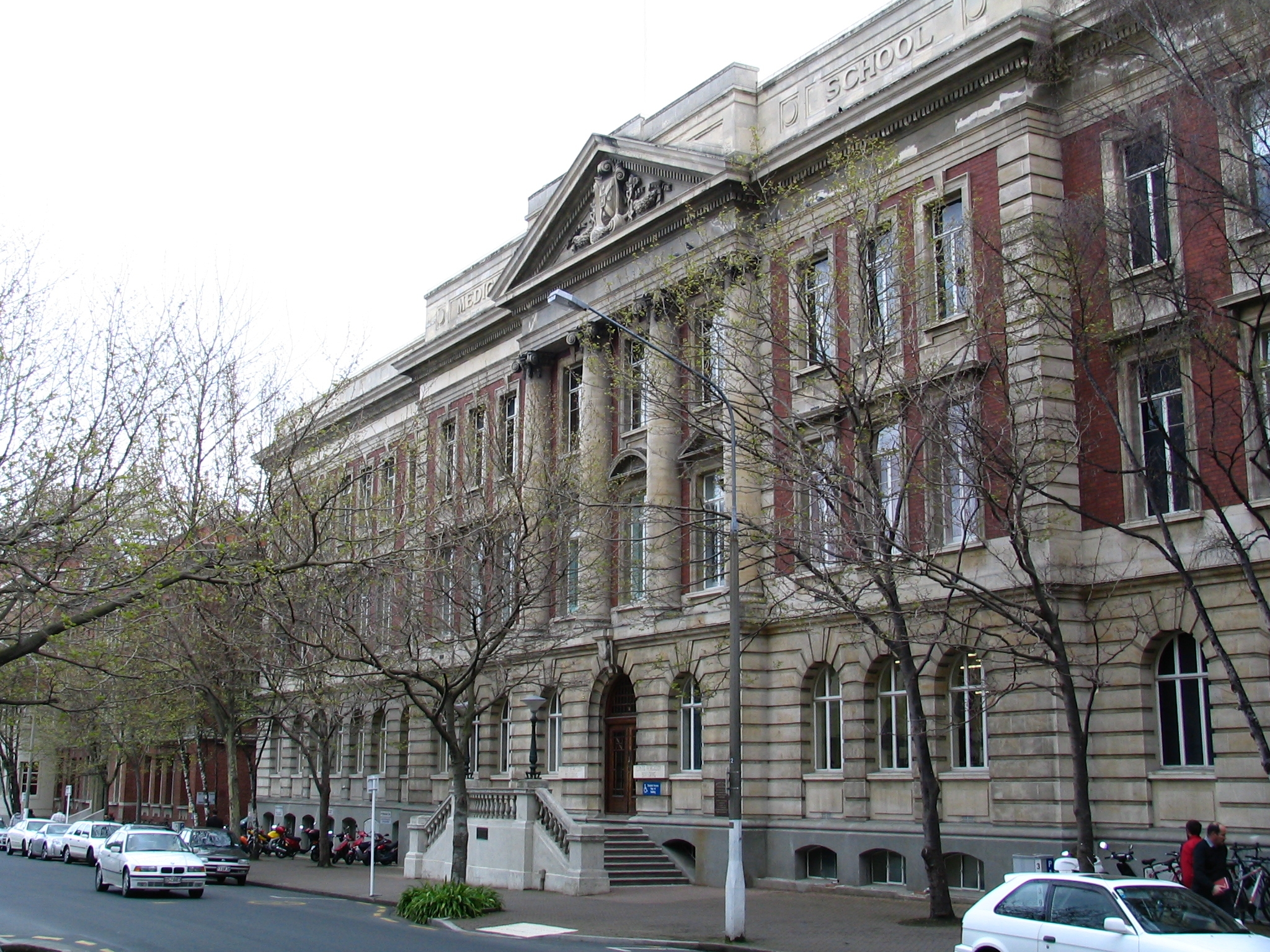
Lindo Ferguson building

Ferguson died on 22 January 1948 in Dunedin.

== Personal life ==
Ferguson married Mary Emmeline Butterworth in 1884 in Dunedin. They had two children one of whom died in childhood. His grandson also called Lindo Ferguson was a notable ophthalmologist, local body politician, chancellor of the University of Auckland and supporter of the preservation of historic buildings.

== Honours and awards ==
Ferguson was appointed a Companion of the Order of St Michael and St George in the 1918 King's Birthday Honours. The University of Melbourne awarded him an honorary doctorate in medicine. In the 1924 New Year Honours, he was appointed a Knight Bachelor. In 1935, he was awarded the King George V Silver Jubilee Medal. He was appointed a Commander of the Order of St John in 1937.
