= Constance Frost =

Doctor, bacteriologist, pathologist

- Born: 23 June 1862; Liverpool
- Died: 29 January 1920; Auckland
- Resting place: Purewa Cemetery
- Education: University of Otago, University of Auckland
- Occupations: Bacteriologist, pathologist
- Employers: Auckland City Hospital (1903–1920); Royal Adelaide Hospital (1900–1903)

Constance Helen Frost (23 June 1862 – 29 January 1920) was a New Zealand medical doctor, bacteriologist and pathologist.

== Early life ==
Frost was born in 1862, probably in Liverpool, England, the second of eight children of wealthy shipowner and merchant Thomas Frost and his wife Mary Ann, née Antwis. She was educated at a boarding school in Sutton Coldfield. Her family moved to New Zealand when she was about 17 years old, settling in Onehunga.

== Career ==
In 1889 Frost enrolled at Auckland University College, and received her BA in 1892. She later enrolled in the University of Otago Medical School, and graduated with MB, ChB in 1900, alongside Alice Woodward, Daisy Platts, and Jane Kinder. Women doctors did not find it easy to gain positions, but Adelaide Hospital had severe staff shortages (see Margaret Graham), so Frost was able to move to South Australia and gain a temporary residency position. In 1902, Frost was appointed as assistant bacteriologist, in charge of the laboratory for 18 months.

In 1903 Frost returned to New Zealand and set up her own practise as a doctor, and became an honorary bacteriologist and pathologist at Auckland Hospital. Taking over from Alice Horsley, Frost was the second woman to hold this position. For the first ten years of her employment at the hospital, Frost was the only woman physician. Despite acknowledging Frost's skill as a bacteriologist, Auckland Hospital continued to advertise for a male replacement and renewed her temporary honorary position annually for fifteen years before finally upgrading it. In 1911 a senior resident, Charles Maguire, who was not accepting of women doctors, was appointed. Despite this, support from Dr Florence Keller, who was the sole woman member of the Auckland Hospital and Charitable Aid Board, resulted in a small honorarium for Frost from 1913, in recognition of her increased workload, which would have impacted her income through private practice. Eventually, in 1918, Frost's position became full-time and she was paid £500 per year. When Frost died in 1920 the man who replaced her was paid double.

== Death ==
Frost remained unmarried. She died at home in Auckland on 29 January 1920 after contracting influenza through her work. She is buried in the Purewa Cemetery in Auckland with other members of her family.

In 2017, Frost featured as one of the Royal Society Te Apārangi's 150 women in 150 words, celebrating the contributions of women to knowledge in New Zealand.
