= Efren Saldivar =

American serial killer

- Born: September 30, 1969 (age 57); Brownsville, Texas, U.S.
- Penalty: Six consecutive life sentences without the possibility of parole

Details
- Victims: 6–200+
- Span of crimes: 1988–1998
- Country: United States
- State: California
- Date apprehended: 13 March 1998
- Imprisoned at: California State Prison, Corcoran

Efren Saldivar (born September 30, 1969) is an American serial killer who murdered patients while working as a respiratory therapist at Adventist Health Glendale, named at that time Glendale Adventist Medical Center in Glendale, California.

== Early life ==
Born in Brownsville, Texas, he graduated from the College of Medical and Dental Careers in North Hollywood, California in 1988. He obtained work as a respiratory therapist employed by the Glendale Adventist Medical Center, working the night shift when there were fewer staff on duty.

== Murders ==
While working at Adventist Health Glendale in Glendale, California, Saldivar killed his patients by injecting a paralytic drug which led to respiratory and/or cardiac arrest. These drugs could have included morphine and suxamethonium chloride as they were found in his locker with fresh and used syringes. Pancuronium (brand name Pavulon) was used in six murders; this drug is used to stop a patient's respiration when they are about to be put on a medical ventilator. He was careful in the selection of his victims, choosing those who were unconscious and usually close to death. This led to no easily detectable rise in the rate or distribution of patient deaths when he was on duty. This in turn hampered the investigation, as there were no easily discernible correlations between changes in the distribution or rate of deaths and his shift pattern (a commonly used tool in examining whether malpractice is taking place).

His employment was ended on March 13, 1998. Shortly afterward, he confessed to 50 murders (a confession he later retracted). In searching for evidence that would be strong enough to obtain a conviction, police exhumed the remains of patients who had died while Saldivar had been on duty and been buried (rather than cremated). The marker that was being sought was unusually high levels of Pavulon in the cadaver, as this drug remains identifiable for many months (unlike succinylcholine chloride and morphine which are decomposed into innocuous compounds relatively quickly).

Police selected 20 bodies to exhume out of a total of 1,050 patients who had died at Glendale Adventist during Saldivar's shifts. After the exhumations, six cadavers had evidence of a lethal concentration of Pavulon. The medical records of these patients showed that the Pavulon found in their bodies was not prescribed to them by a medical professional.

On March 12, 2002, at age 32, Saldivar pleaded guilty to six counts of murder and received seven consecutive life sentences without the possibility of parole. Saldivar is incarcerated at California State Prison in Corcoran, California.

== Number of victims ==
In his initial confession in 1998, Saldivar told police that he actively killed up to 50 patients and he contributed to the deaths of between 100 and 200 patients. Saldivar later confessed to killing at least 60 patients by 1994, claiming that he "lost count" after that but continued killing for at least three more years.

Sergeant John McKillop of the Glendale Police Department led the investigation, which was fully supported by Adventist Health Glendale. Statistical analysis indicates that the total number of murders committed by Saldivar could be as high as 200, but no convincing physical evidence will ever be available to confirm or refute this possibility due to bodies being cremated after death or simply the effects of bodily harm.

== Victims ==
- Jose Alfaro
- Salbi Asatryan – Victim's family accepted a $60,000 settlement from the hospital.
- Myrtle Brower
- Balbino Castro
- Jean Coyle – the only victim who survived.
- Luina Schidlowski
- Eleanora Schlegel

== See also ==
- List of serial killers in the United States
- List of serial killers by number of victims
