= Annie Crisp =

English nurse who also worked in New Zealand and Canada

Annie Alice Crisp RRC (1854 – 11 June 1953) was an English-born nurse who established New Zealand's first school of nursing and served as superintendent of Auckland Hospital, in New Zealand. She also established Winnipeg Children's Hospital, in Canada.

== Biography ==
Crisp was born to a farming couple in Warwickshire, England, and completed her nursing training at Queen's Hospital, Birmingham. She joined the nursing section of the British Army and served as a nurse in the Anglo-Zulu and Anglo-Egyptian wars, and in the Sudan and South Africa. She was decorated in each of these campaigns, being awarded the Egypt Medal and the Khedive's Star.

While Crisp was serving overseas, her father became unwell in England and he and his wife emigrated to New Zealand in search of a better climate for him. Crisp travelled from South Africa to New Zealand to join her parents. She settled in Auckland, where she established New Zealand's first school of nursing and was appointed lady superintendent of Auckland Hospital. Trained in the Florence Nightingale tradition she is credited with turning around the conditions at the hospital which were overcrowded and unhygienic, and instituting proper nursing training. In August 1883, Crisp was awarded the Royal Red Cross for her military nursing service; the medal was presented by Governor William Jervois at a ceremony at Government House, Auckland, the following April.

In 1888, Crisp married a medical doctor from England, John Bond, and the couple moved to the United States in 1890. Crisp's husband worked on the British exhibit at Chicago's 1893 Worlds Fair. In 1903, the couple settled in Winnipeg, Canada. Crisp became aware of the high child mortality rate in the city and began to campaign for the opening of a children's hospital. In 1909, she founded a hospital on Beaconsfield Street that later became the Winnipeg Children's Hospital.

Crisp died at Winnipeg Children's Hospital and was buried in the St John's Cathedral cemetery.
