= Adventist Health Glendale =

- Adventist Health
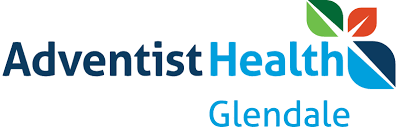

Geography
- Location: 1509 East Wilson Terrace, Glendale, California, United States
- Coordinates: 34°9′2.48″N 118°13′49.09″W

Organization
- Care system: Private hospital
- Type: Acute-care hospital
- Religious affiliation: Seventh-day Adventist Church

Services
- Beds: 515

Helipads
- Helipad: Aeronautical chart and airport information for CL06 at SkyVector

History
- Former names: Glendale Sanitarium; Glendale Sanitarium and Hospital; Glendale Adventist Medical Center
- Opened: 1905

Links
- Website: www.adventisthealth.org/glendale/
- Lists: Hospitals in California

Adventist Health Glendale is a non-profit hospital campus in Glendale, California, United States, that is owned by Adventist Health. Adventist Health Glendale, located on Wilson Terrace, near California State Route 2 and California State Route 134, is one of the city's oldest businesses, founded in 1905, a year before Glendale was incorporated as a city. It was then known as Glendale Sanitarium, and it occupied the former Glendale Hotel, a 75-room Victorian structure on what is now Broadway Avenue.

== History ==
In 1905, the Seventh-day Adventist Church purchased the Glendale Hotel from real estate developer Leslie C. Brand, and transformed the Victorian era building into Glendale Sanitarium with 75 rooms. In 1905, 1917 and 1920, the medical facility expanded. In 1922, Glendale Sanitarium and Hospital had outgrown its location in the city. In 1924, a new medical facility opened east of Glendale for $1.25 million. In 1973, the medical facility performed its first cardiac surgery. At the end of July 2017 Glendale Adventist Medical Center changed its name to Adventist Health Glendale.

== Murders ==
Dr. Peter Martin Keller husband of Nettie Florence Keller was shot to death by a patient at Glendale Sanitarium on October 1, 1931.

Efren Saldivar, a respiratory therapist at Adventist Health Glendale until 1998, came to be dubbed the "Angel of Death" when he confessed to 50 murders of patients through the injection of muscle-paralyzing drugs, though he later retracted the confession. In 2002, he was charged with six murders and pleaded guilty, and was sentenced to prison for life. Many more patients are believed to have been murdered.

== Events ==
Adventist Health Glendale is involved in many annual events such as Glendale Downtown Dash held on daylight savings day every March, the American Cancer Societys Relay for Life and American Heart Associations Saving Strokes.

== Medical mission work ==
Starting in 2015 Adventist Health Glendale has had a partnership with Armenia Fund to provide medical services to Noyemberyan Hospital, in Noyemberyan, Armenia. For each medical mission trip Adventist Health Glendale buys large amounts of medical equipment, surgical supplies, pharmaceuticals, and other required medical/surgical items. And Armenia Fund ships the medical supplies to Noyemberyan hospital. 5,750 patients have been given care in internal medicine, cardiology, pulmonology, gynecology, neurology, orthopedics, and pediatrics. 235 surgeries were done, from gallbladder, hernia, orthopedic, and maxillofacial procedures to remove lumps and tumors.

== Awards and recognitions ==
The hospital received a grade A from The Leapfrog Group from spring 2015 to May 2026. Adventist Health Glendale received from the Centers for Medicare & Medicaid Services a five-star rating from 2020 to 2022.

The medical facility was recognized by Healthgrades with its America's 250 Best Hospital Award from 2022 to 2025.

== Notable patients ==
- Ray Combs - former host of Family Feud who committed suicide at the hospital.
- Paul Baghdadlian - singer who died of lung cancer at the hospital.
- Milt Bernhart - trombonist who died of congestive heart failure at the hospital.
- Gene Scott - television preacher and religious scholar, who died at the hospital.

== See also ==
- List of Seventh-day Adventist hospitals
