= Parma Nand =

Fijian-New Zealand surgeon

Parma Nand FRACS (12 June 1961 – 2 May 2025) was a Fiji-born New Zealand cardiothoracic surgeon, physician, humanitarian, and founder of the Friends of Fiji Heart Foundation New Zealand. He was widely recognised for his contributions to cardiac surgery in New Zealand and the Pacific, particularly through annual volunteer surgical missions providing free open-heart surgery and cardiac care in Fiji.

Nand spent more than three decades working in cardiothoracic surgery in New Zealand and became known for leading volunteer surgical teams to Fiji through the Friends of Fiji Heart Foundation. His work enabled dozens of Fijian patients to undergo life-saving cardiac surgery who otherwise would not have had access to treatment.

== Early life and education ==
Nand was born in Labasa, Fiji, and grew up in a large Indo-Fijian family. He was one of eleven children and was raised in modest economic circumstances. During his childhood, Nand recalled studying until very late at night under a communal street light.

He attended school in Fiji before pursuing medical studies overseas. Nand later migrated to New Zealand where he undertook advanced surgical training and established his career in cardiothoracic surgery.

== Medical career ==
Nand worked as a cardiothoracic surgeon in New Zealand for more than 30 years. He was associated with Auckland City Hospital and MercyAscot Hospital and specialised in adult cardiac surgery, thoracic surgery, vascular surgery, heart transplantation, lung transplantation, and ventricular assist device implantation.

Throughout his medical career, Nand became known for his advocacy of improved cardiac care access for Pacific communities, particularly in Fiji. He regularly coordinated medical missions involving volunteer surgeons, nurses, perfusionists, and healthcare professionals from New Zealand and overseas.

Nand was a travelling specialist who gained training and recognition at international hospitals such as Freeman Hospital, Toronto General Hospital and Westmead Hospital

== Friends of Fiji Heart Foundation ==
Nand founded the Friends of Fiji Heart Foundation New Zealand, an organisation dedicated to providing cardiac treatment and surgical support for patients in Fiji.

Under his leadership, volunteer medical teams conducted annual open-heart surgery programmes at the Sri Sathya Sai Sanjeevani Children’s Hospital in Fiji. The programmes provided free surgeries and post-operative care for Fijian patients.

In 2023, volunteer specialists led by Nand performed 23 successful open-heart surgeries during a cardiac mission in Fiji.

The Friends of Fiji Heart Foundation conducted 550 operations in a span of 13 years.

== Public profile and recognition ==
Nand received widespread recognition in both Fiji and New Zealand for his medical and humanitarian contributions. Fiji political leaders, medical professionals, and community organisations publicly acknowledged his role in improving cardiac healthcare access for Pacific patients.

He was described by Deputy Prime Minister of Fiji Biman Prasad as “a giant amongst surgeons” whose work transformed the lives of many Fijian families.

== Personal life ==
Nand lived in Auckland, New Zealand. Outside medicine, he was involved in philanthropy and community initiatives supporting Pacific and Indo-Fijian communities.

== Death and legacy ==
Nand died on 2 May 2025 at the age of 63. He is survived by his three children.

Following his death, tributes were issued by political leaders, surgeons, medical organisations, and former patients in Fiji and New Zealand. Many described him as a pioneer in Pacific cardiac surgery outreach and humanitarian healthcare.
