= Margaret Cruickshank =

New Zealand's first registered female doctor

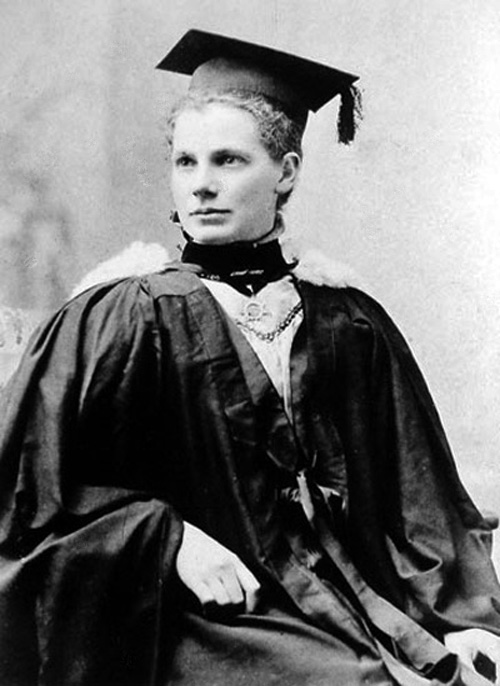
- Margaret Cruickshank, ca 1897
- Born: 1 January 1873; Palmerston, New Zealand
- Died: 28 November 1918 (aged 45); Waimate, New Zealand
- Monuments: Statue of Margaret Cruickshank in Waimate
- Education: University of Otago
- Occupation: Medical doctor
- Known for: First registered female doctor in New Zealand; first female doctor to work in a general practice in New Zealand

Margaret Barnett Cruickshank (1 January 1873 – 28 November 1918) was a New Zealand medical practitioner who died during the 1918 influenza pandemic. She was the first registered female doctor in New Zealand. Posthumously, she was the first woman, other than Queen Victoria, to have a monument erected to her in New Zealand.

== Early life and family ==
Cruickshank was born a twin on New Year's Day 1873 in Palmerston, a small town in the South Island of New Zealand. Her twin was also a girl, Christina (1873-1939). Their parents were Elizabeth (born Taggart) and George, who had emigrated together from Scotland; first to Australia and then to Dunstan in Central Otago, to join the gold rush there.

Cruickshank's mother died in June 1883 while the twins were young and as a result they were needed at home to help raise their five younger siblings. They took turns to attend school; the one who attended teaching the one who had stayed home. In this way they completed their studies at Palmerston District High School and then went on together to Otago Girls' High School in Dunedin. Both girls were duxes in 1891. Christina would go on to earn an MA and MSc at the University of Otago and was principal of Wanganui Girls' College for over 20 years.

== Medical career ==
Cruickshank attended the University of Otago Dunedin School of Medicine and was the second woman, following Emily Siedeberg, in New Zealand to complete medical school, graduating in 1897.

She went into general practice (the first woman in New Zealand to do so) in Waimate initially through an assistantship with established doctor HC Barclay. She continued her studies and was awarded an MD in 1903. The next women in New Zealand to graduate in medicine were in 1900: Alice Woodward, Daisy Platts and Jane Kinder.

In 1913 Cruickshank completed postgraduate studies in Edinburgh and Dublin, travelling also to Europe and America. To show their esteem, the people of Waimate presented her with a gold watch, chain and a purse of 100 gold sovereigns, at a public function before she left. She was praised at a farewell for "her freedom from pretence, her capacity for loyal friendship and her gentleness, patience and unselfishness." The Waimate Museum displays this gold pocket watch. The inscription inside the watch case reads: "Presented to Margaret B Cruickshank, from her many Waimate Friends Feby. 13th 1913."

During World War I she organised the work of the Waimate Red Cross Fund, and took over the case load of her partner, Dr Barclay, who had enlisted and gone overseas. To support fund-raising efforts for the Waimate Red Ross, she also nominated as Waimate's queen, during Queen Carnival competition in 1915. She was also one of three doctors who shared his role of hospital superintendent in his absence. When the 1918 flu pandemic broke out, Cruickshank worked night and day, caring for the children of ill parents, cooking meals for them and even milking the cow of a family whose adults were too ill to do so themselves. Eventually she fell ill herself and died on 28 November 1918.

== Legacy ==
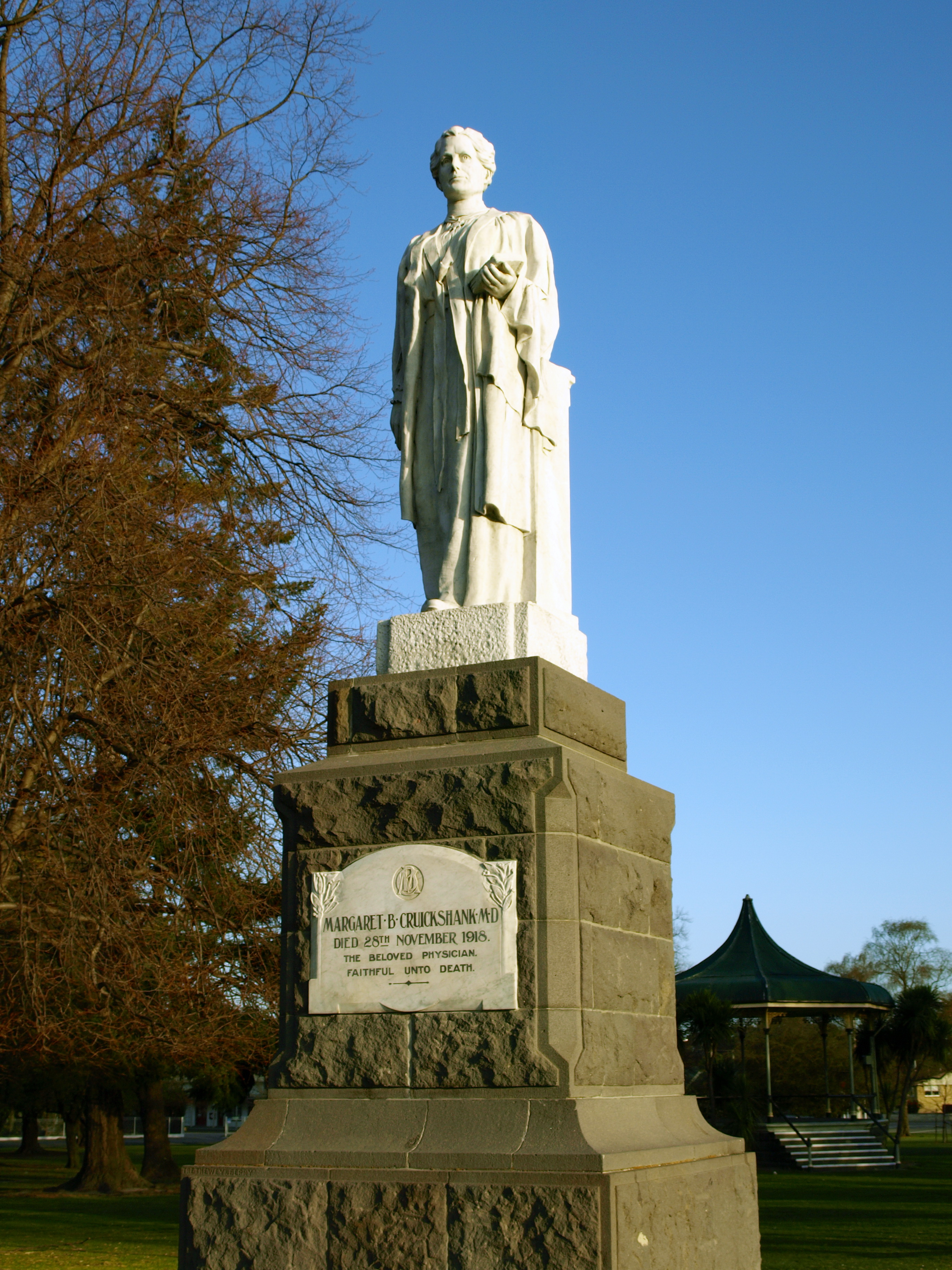
Cruickshank memorial in 2009

In 1923 a memorial statue was unveiled at a memorial service at Seddon Square in Waimate. The speakers at the ceremony included Cruickshank's former classmate Dr Emily Siedeberg, representing the New Zealand Medical Women's Association, the member of parliament for Waitaki, John Bitchener, and the chair of the local council, Mr. Hart. Miss M. Allen was also present, as a representative of the Otago University Women's Association. The unveiling was performed by Cruickshank's landlady of 23 years, Mrs Barclay.

The statue was carved by New Zealand sculptor William Trethewey. It was the first monument erected to a woman other than Queen Victoria in New Zealand and its inscription reads "The Beloved Physician – Faithful Unto Death".

In 1948 the maternity ward in Waimate Hospital was named after her.

In 2007 the New Zealand Ministry of Health named 'Exercise Cruickshank' a pandemic preparedness exercise after Cruickshank in recognition of her work during the 1918 influenza pandemic.

The Waimate Museum & Archives holds a collection of objects, letters, photos and artwork pertaining to Dr Cruickshank. Some of these can be viewed online via NZMuseums.

In 2017, Cruickshank was selected as one of the Royal Society Te Apārangi's "150 women in 150 words", celebrating the contributions of women to knowledge in New Zealand.
