= Emily Siedeberg =

New Zealand doctor

Emily Siedeberg CBE
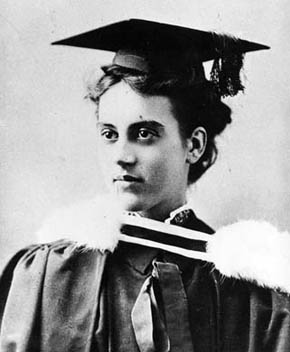
- Born: 17 February 1873; Clyde, New Zealand
- Died: 13 June 1968 (aged 95); Oamaru, New Zealand
- Education: University of Otago
- Occupation: Medical practitioner
- Known for: First female medical graduate in New Zealand
- Spouse: James McKinnon (m. 1928; died 1949)

Emily Hancock Siedeberg-McKinnon CBE (17 February 1873 – 13 June 1968) was a New Zealand medical practitioner and hospital superintendent. She was also the country's first female medical graduate.

== Early life ==
Siedeberg was born in 1873 in Clyde, Otago, New Zealand. She was the third child of Irish Quaker Anna Thompson and Franz David Siedeberg, a German Jewish architect who had emigrated to New Zealand in 1861 and taken up mining. When Emily was three the family settled in Dunedin, her father becoming a successful building contractor. Emily was educated at the Normal School and at Otago Girls' High School, where she held a board scholarship. From an early age she accepted her father's dictum that she should train as a doctor.

== Career ==
Encouraged by her father, she studied medicine, becoming the first woman to enter medical school in 1891, at the University of Otago Medical School. Although the dean, John Scott, was reluctant to admit Siedeberg, the university council decided that the school was open to men and women. The opposition Siedeberg faced was minor compared to that received by women trying to enrol in medical degrees overseas. Siedeberg's experience was made easier when she was joined in her second year by Margaret Cruickshank. The next women in New Zealand to graduate in medicine were in 1900: Alice Woodward, Daisy Platts and Jane Kinder.

Siedeberg graduated from the University of Otago Medical School in 1896. She did her post-graduate studies in obstetrics, gynaecology and children's diseases at the Rotunda Hospital, Dublin, and in Berlin. After postgraduate training and work experience overseas, she eventually registered as a medical practitioner and set up a private practice in Dunedin, with financial help from her father. She was appointed Medical Superintendent at St. Helens Hospital, Dunedin, and served from 1905–1938.

Dr. Siedeberg was active in community and welfare work. A founding member of the Dunedin branch of the New Zealand Society for the Protection of Women and Children in 1899, she was president of the Dunedin branch from 1933 to 1948 and became honorary life president in 1949.

== Other activities ==
Siedeberg was also a foundation member of the following organisations:

- Otago University Women's Association
- New Zealand Federation of University Women
- The Townswomen's Guild
- Delegate to the first Pan-Pacific Women's Conference
- National Council of Women of New Zealand (Dunedin branch) (1918) and served three terms as NCW president
- New Zealand Medical Women's Association founder (1921) and first president
- Otago Pioneer Women's Memorial Association

== Personal life ==
Siedeberg married James Alexander McKinnon in Los Angeles on 8 October 1928 and would be known as E.H. Siedeberg McKinnon and Emily H. Siedeberg-McKinnon. They had no children. He died in 1949. In 1924 Siedeberg-McKinnon delivered Janet Frame, the New Zealand author and screenwriter.

Siedeberg died in the Presbyterian Social Service Association home at Oamaru, New Zealand, on 13 June 1968, aged 95.

== Recognition ==
Siedeberg was awarded a life membership of the New Zealand Branch of the British Medical Association (1929) and of the New Zealand Registered Nurses' Association (1939), and a King George V Silver Jubilee Medal (1935). In the 1949 New Year Honours. she was appointed a Commander of the Order of the British Empire for services in the field of medicine and welfare of women.

The street Emily Siedeberg Place in Dunedin was named in her honour in 1993, as part of Suffrage Centennial Year. Siedeberg Drive in Flat Bush, Auckland, was also named in her honour. In 2017, Siedeberg was selected as one of the Royal Society Te Apārangi's "150 women in 150 words", celebrating the contributions of women to knowledge in New Zealand.

Siedeberg's residence in York Place, Dunedin, has been classified by Heritage New Zealand Pouhere Taonga as a Category 1 Historic Place.
