= Auckland City Hospital =

Coordinates: 36°51′38″S 174°46′12″E

- Te Whatu Ora - Te Toka Tumai Auckland
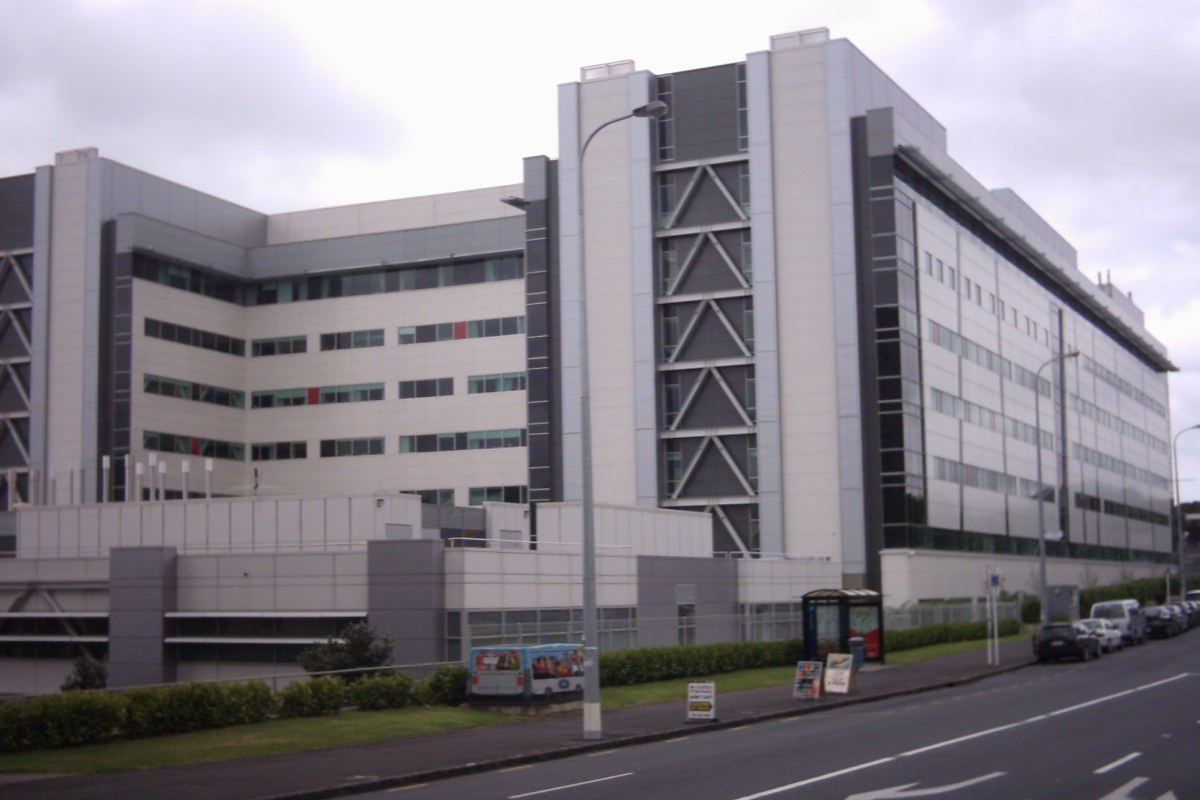
- The main hospital building, built 2003

Geography
- Location: Grafton, Auckland, New Zealand

Organisation
- Care system: Te Whatu Ora
- Type: General, teaching
- Religious affiliation: None
- Affiliated university: University of Auckland

Services
- Emergency department: Yes
- Beds: 1,187

Helipads
- Helipad: ICAO: NZJL

History
- Founded: 1847 (179 years ago)

Links
- Website: www.adhb.health.nz/hospitals-and-clinics/auckland-city-hospital
- Lists: Hospitals in New Zealand

Auckland City Hospital is a tertiary level public hospital located in Park Rd, Grafton, Auckland, New Zealand. It is the largest hospital in New Zealand, with a total of 1,187 beds (as of 2026). The first hospital on the site dates back to 1847. Auckland City Hospital was established in 2003 when Auckland Hospital (acute adult care), Green Lane Hospital (cardio-thoracic care) and National Women's Hospital (maternity, newborn and obstetrics and gynecology) were brought under one roof. The hospital is closely associated with Starship Children's Health, a separate subsidiary facility on the same grounds, located just to the northwest of the City Hospital. Rare or complex medical conditions from all over New Zealand may get referred here. Public hospitals in Auckland have been run by Te Whatu Ora – Health New Zealand since 2022.

The hospital is also a research and teaching facility, providing training for medical students, doctors, nurses, midwives and other health professionals. It is adjacent to the University of Auckland Medical School.

== History ==
=== 19th century ===
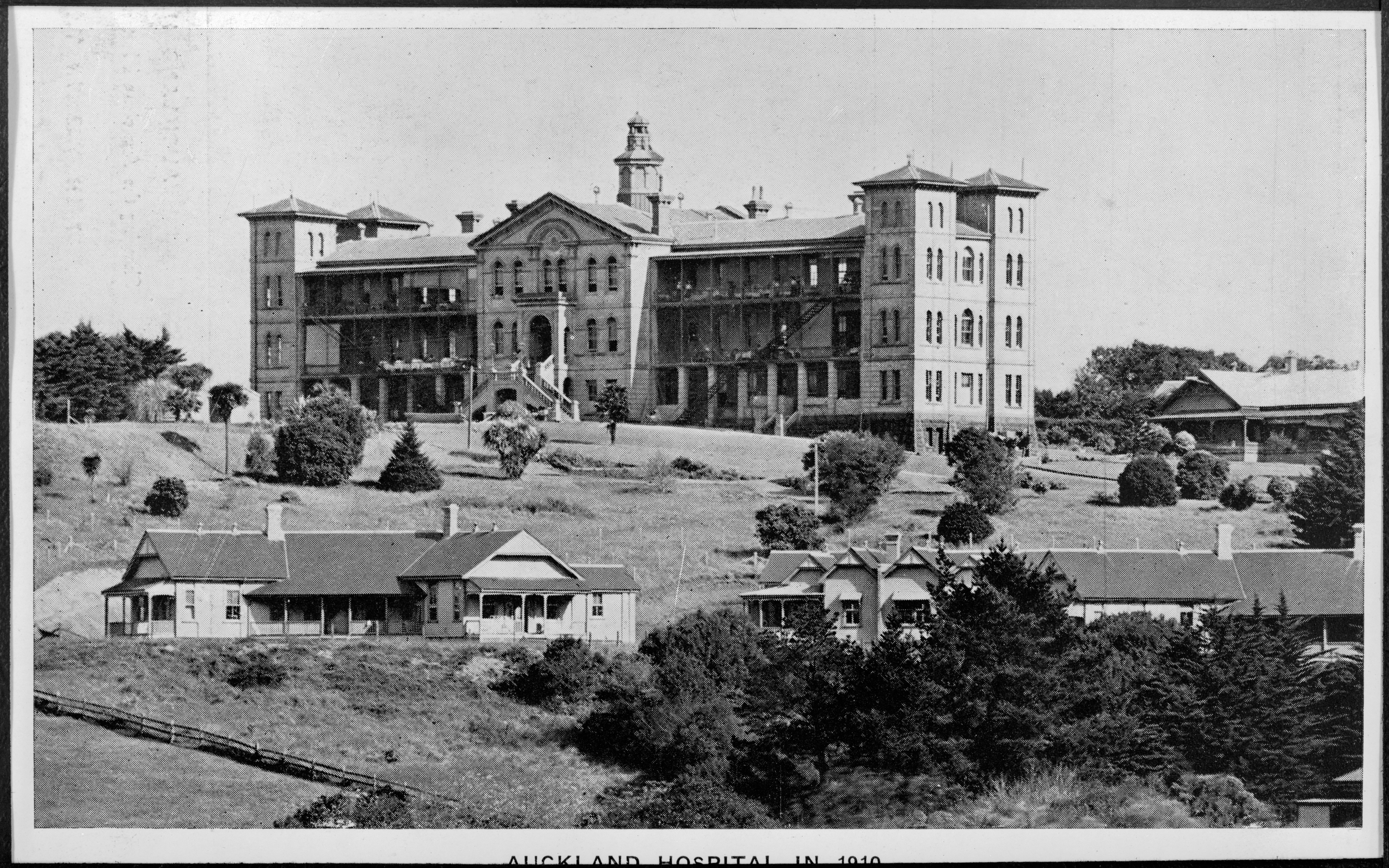
Auckland Hospital, 1910

Before 1847 there were two small private hospitals, one at St John's Anglican College and the other attached to the barracks of the 58th regiment. In 1847 the first hospital for the Auckland urban area was founded by the colonial government with authority transferred to the Auckland Provincial Government upon its creation. The hospital was managed by the national government following the abolishment of provinces in 1877 until 1885, when The Hospital and Charitable Institutions Act was passed, which constituted a locally elected Auckland Hospital Board.

Built on the Grafton site of the current Auckland City Hospital there were some objections to the location which was some distance from town. The wooden building was designed by architect Frederick Thatcher and contained four wards and housed 50 patients. The patients were generally seamen, Māori and poorer working class Europeans.

Thomas Moore Philson was appointed superintendent of the hospital from 1859 to 1883. By the late 1860s he was drawing attention to the lack of accommodation for women patients, the inadequate water supply and the need for a new building. In 1877, a new building in an Italianate style, designed by Philip Herapath (architect to the provincial government) and modelled on St Thomas' Hospital in London was constructed for under £20,000. The original building was used to house the aged until it was burnt down on purpose in 1890. Under Philson the new hospital became known for taking on many charity cases but in 1883 George Grabham, the inspector of hospitals, reported overcrowding, lack of control of drugs, vermin, poor hygiene, no surgical instruments for the operating theatre and limited training of the staff, which changed only with the hiring of a new matron, Annie Crisp, in the same year. Having trained in the new tradition of Florence Nightingale, she is credited with turning the hospital into a real hospital, caring for the sick rather than being an infirmary for old men, and instituting proper nurse training. As Lady Superintendent she worked at the hospital for 13 years and she was awarded the Royal Red Cross in 1884.

Temporary fever wards were built in 1885 and 1887 to cater for smallpox and typhoid cases. In 1898 the Costley Block opened housing a 50 bed children's ward and accident ward. This was funded from the estate of Edward Costley, whose bequest also provided for the building of the Costley Wards at Green Lane Hospital. Other buildings which opened were a kitchen in 1896 and a nurses' home in 1890.

=== 20th century ===
A medical superintendent's residence was built in 1904 and theatres in the Costley building. In 1906 permanent fever wards for scarlet fever and diphtheria were built, following a recommendation in 1883 by the inspector of hospitals that the hospital have a detached fever hospital to cope with the spread of infectious diseases. The nurses' home was expanded in 1910-1911 and in the 1920s. By 1915 the children's wards in the Costley Building were deemed inadequate and plans drawn up for a new children's hospital. In 1918 the Princess Mary Children's Hospital was opened by Lady Liverpool, the Governor General's wife. During the 1918 flu epidemic staffing at the hospital was severely affected as nurses and doctors became ill although the hospital was able to provide extra beds to cope with the influx of patients.

In 1924 the Minister of Health Māui Pōmare laid the foundation for a new building which was named the Wallace Block after the Hospital Board's chairman William Wallace. The Block, designed by the Hospital Board's architect, was opened in July 1926 by the Minister of Health J.A. Young and provided more ward space as well as facilities for x-ray. A new Infectious Diseases Block was opened in 1931. Although plans for expansion and redevelopment, including demolition of the Costley Block and 1877 Herapath building, were considered during the 1930s any action was prevented by the Depression and World War II. It was not until the 1950s that discussions about replacing the 1877 Herapath building were revived, though there was great attachment to the building in spite of its deficiencies.

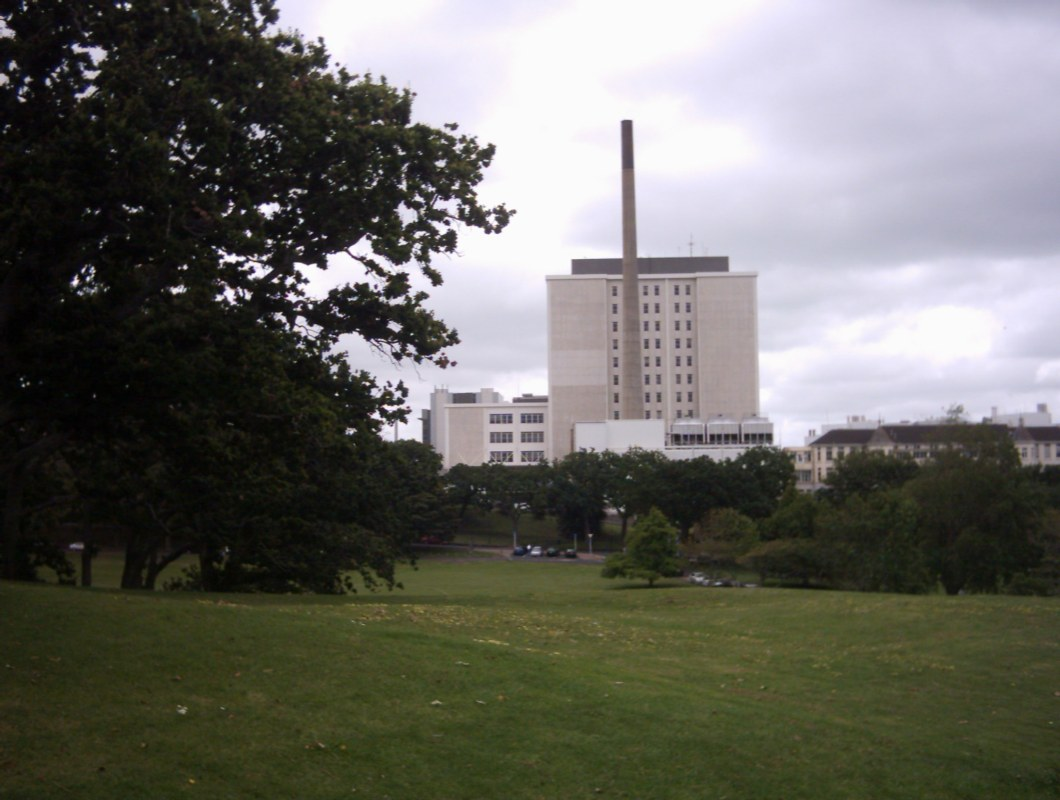
The support building, built 1965-1975, as seen from the Auckland Domain. Visible in front is the smokestack of the complex's central heating.

Pressure for a new building grew as it would bring together the many departments that were scattered in different buildings. Also medical and surgical practices and training were changing with more specialties and sub-specialties all of which required more modern facilities. The Herapath building was demolished in 1964 to make way for a new structure designed by architects Stephenson & Turner. Construction of the 14-storey block began in 1965. It was completed in stages with the western part of the building opened by the Queen in 1970. Changes were made to the building plans along the way resulting in final completion in 1975. After the construction of the new main building in 2003 it became a support block.

A hospital library was built in 1960-1961 and opened in 1961. It was named the Ernest and Marion Davis Library and funded by an endowment from Ernest Davis who offered to build it in memory of his wife. The library holds a medical history collection of books, surgical instruments and apothecary jars while current library services are provided by the Philson Library in the Auckland Medical School.

=== Training medical students ===
From 1938 the University of Otago maintained a Branch Medical Faculty at Auckland Hospital for training sixth year medical students. During the 1950s discussions took place about the need for another medical school in Auckland and Cabinet gave its approval in 1964. When a dedicated medical school building in Park Rd was not going to be completed by 1968 for the first student intake the University of Auckland negotiated with the Auckland Hospital Board to provide accommodation until the medical school building was completed in 1974. Training also depended on the new block being ready in time for the students to begin their clinical training in 1971.

== Current buildings ==
The current main hospital facility opened in 2003 with 710 acute beds. The building, which took three years to build, cost NZ$180 million. It is nine levels high (ten including plant), five levels less than the older part of the hospital, which has now become the support building linked by an atrium to the main building. The new structure with 75,575 m^{2.} is one of New Zealand's largest public buildings. It was designed by Jasmax in conjunction with McConnel Smith and Johnson Architects Sydney, and built by Fletcher Construction. The facilities included the emergency department, cardiology, neurology, general medical and surgical wards, intensive care units and operating theatres.

The opening of the 2003 building saw the restructuring of central Auckland's hospital services by bringing together adult surgical and medical services from three hospitals under one roof called Auckland City Hospital: Auckland Hospital (adult care), Green Lane Hospital (cardio-thoracic care) and National Women's Hospital (maternity, newborn and obstetrics and gynecology). A link was built to connect Starship Hospital for children to the main building. A single hospital avoided duplication of services such as diagnostic facilities, laboratories and support services which had occurred previously. The old hospital building was refurbished to create administration and clinical support facilities.

== Administration ==
During the health reforms of the New Zealand health system in the early 1990s, Auckland Hospital was run as a business - in the model of state-owned ents of New Zealand, i.e. with the instruction to return a profit. In accordance with this policy, Auckland Hospital was officially known as Auckland Crown Health Enterprise.

In 2001 the government established District Health Boards and Auckland City Hospital became part of Auckland District Health Board. On 1 July 2022 Te Whatu Ora – Health New Zealand and Te Aka Whai Ora – Māori Health Authority became Aotearoa’s new national health authorities and Auckland DHB as an entity was disestablished and became part of Health New Zealand.

== Notable staff ==
- Alice Horsley, anaesthetist
- Constance Frost, bacteriologist and pathologist
- Charlotte Le Gallais, nurse
- John Staveley, haematologist
- Parma Nand, cardiothoracic surgeon

== Gallery ==
Auckland Hospital

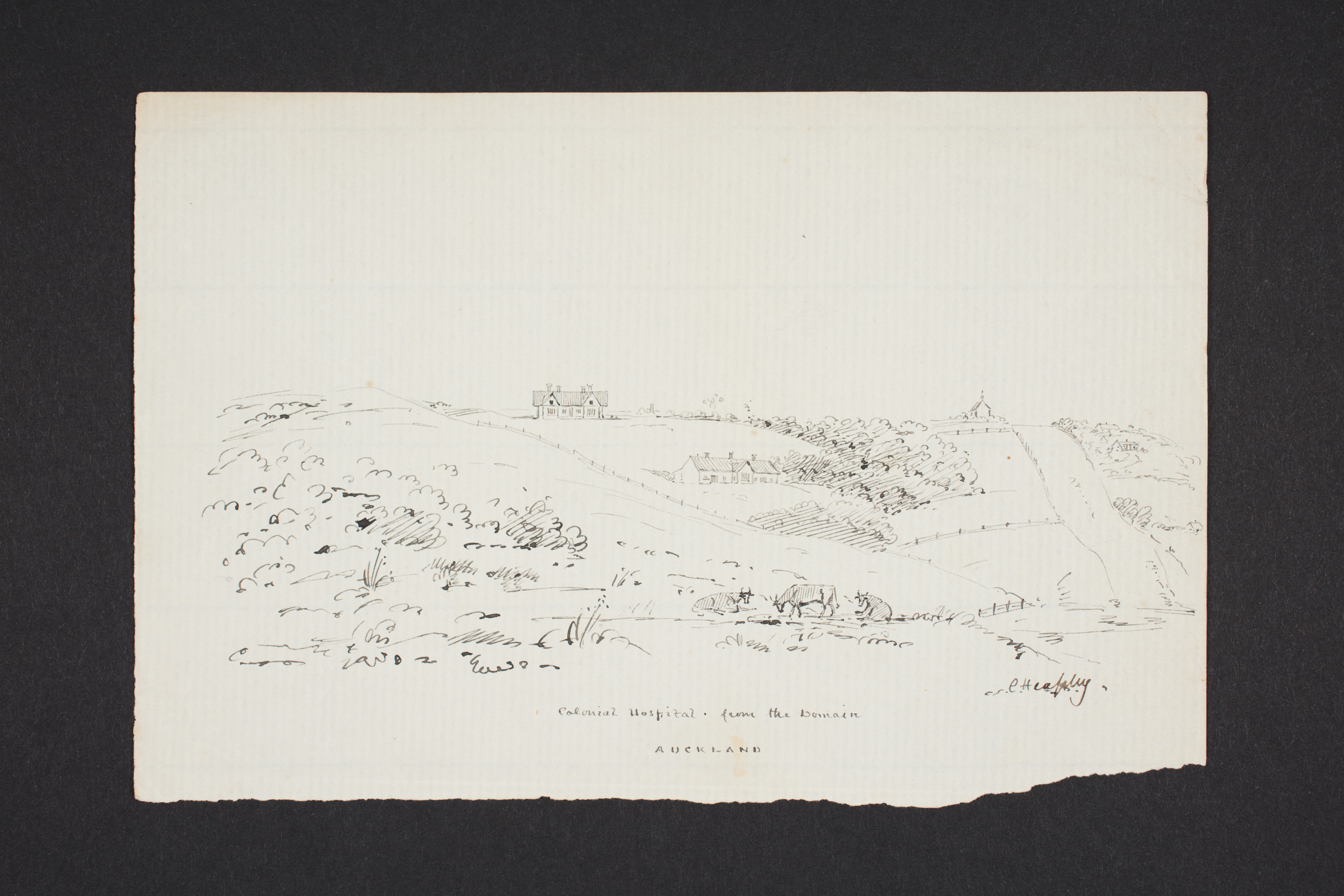
Colonial hospital from the Domain, by Charles Heaphy

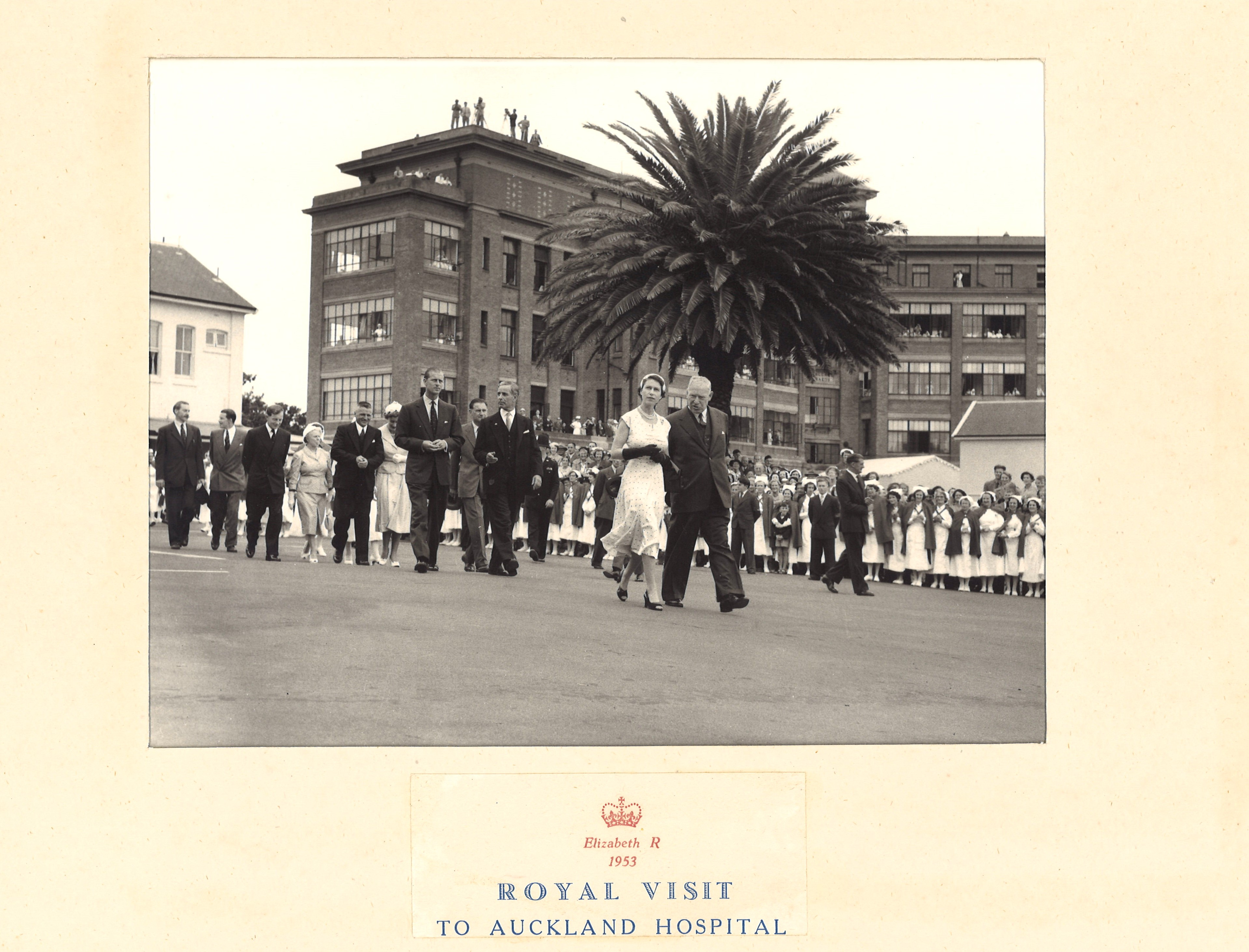
Queen Elizabeth and the Duke of Edinburgh visit, 1953.

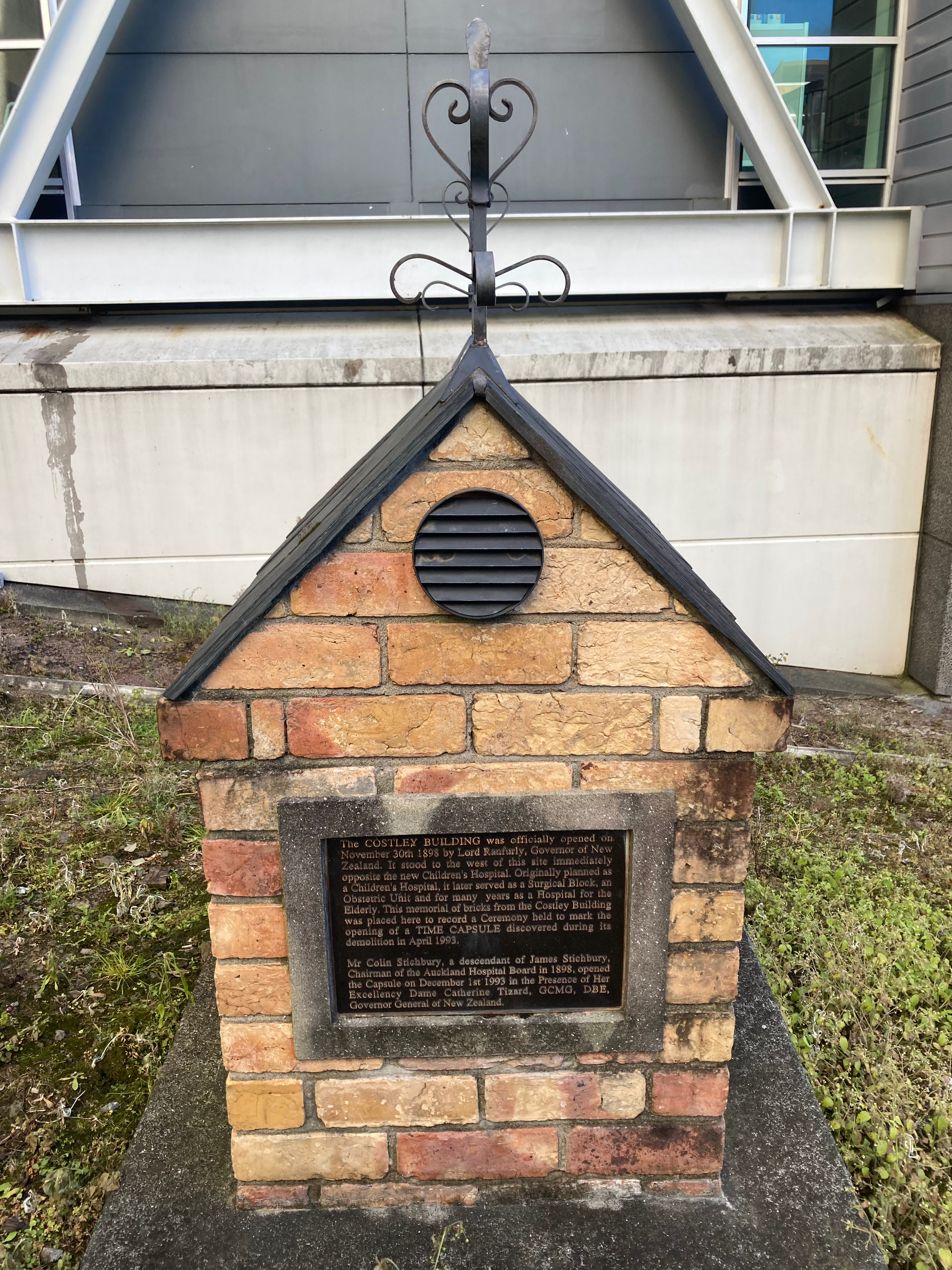
Memorial to the Costley Building, on the north east corner of the main building

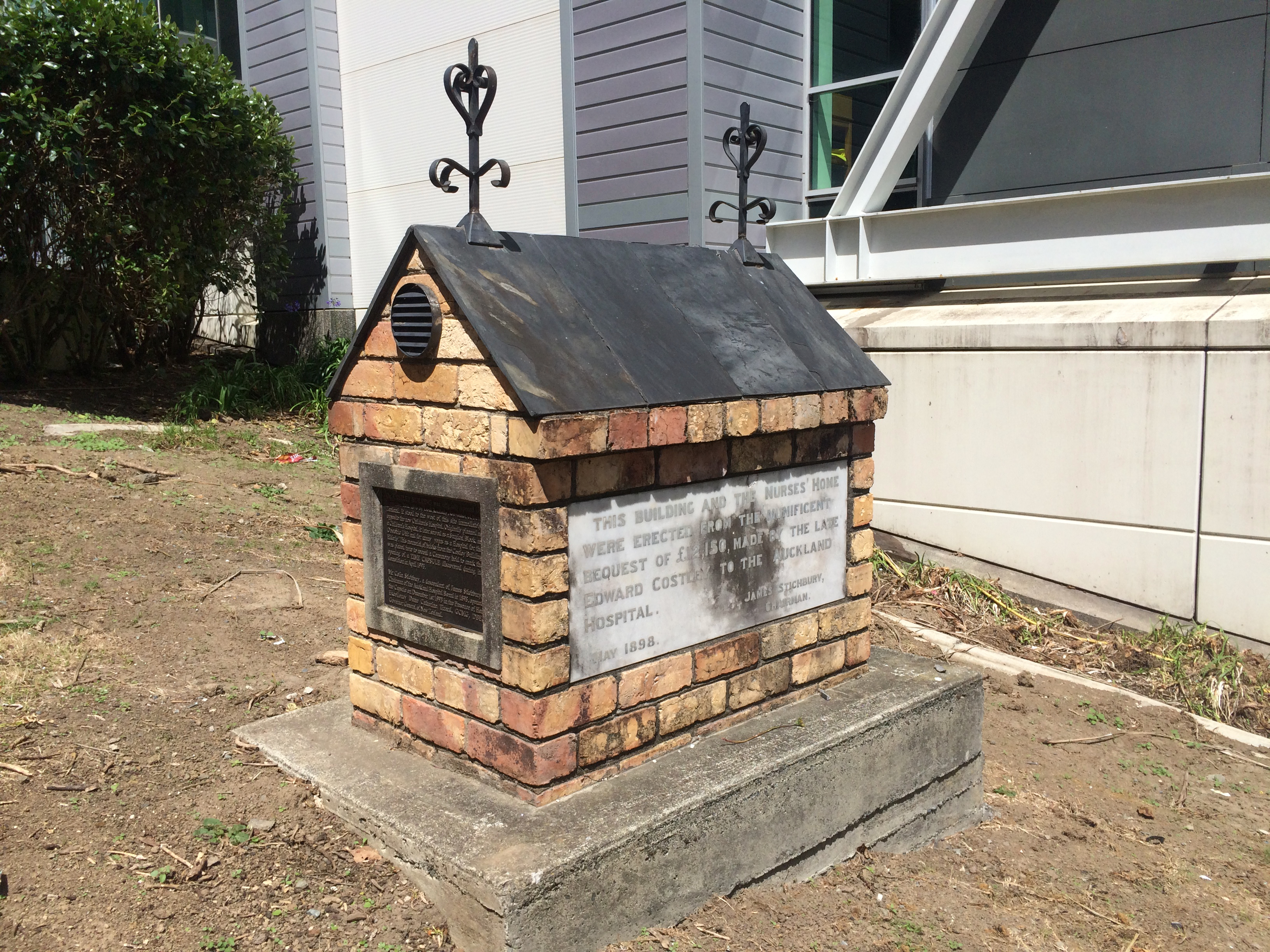
Memorial to the Costley Building, on the north east corner of the main building

== See also ==
- List of hospitals in New Zealand
- Starship Children's Health
- Westpac Rescue Helicopter
- University of Auckland, Faculty of Medical and Health Sciences
