= Kathleen Pih–Chang =

Chinese–born New Zealand medical doctor

Kathleen Pih-Chang
- Born: 1902
- Died: 1991 (aged 88–89)
- Education: University of Otago
- Occupation: Doctor
- Known for: first Chinese medical graduate in New Zealand
- Spouse: Francis Chang

Kathleen Pih–Chang (1902–1991; also known as Pih Zhen–Wah and Kathleen Pih) was a Chinese–born New Zealand medical doctor and the first Chinese person to graduate as a doctor from the University of Otago in 1929.

== Early life ==
Pih-Chang was born in Lin–Shui (formerly Antung) in Jiangsu Province. She was named "Pih Zhen–Wah" which translates as "graduate" or "finish" or "to awaken and serve China".

As a small child she was severely ill with dysentery and was nursed by a New Zealand missionary, Margaret Reid. Reid was taught Chinese by Pih–Chang's father at the China Inland Mission in Antung. When it was time for Reid to return to New Zealand she wished to bring Pih–Chang with her and to continue to care for her. To do so she had to obtain special permission from Lord Plunket, the Governor General as Chinese were restricted entry to the country. In New Zealand Pih–Chang was named "Kathleen" after Plunket's daughter. Reid married Charles Russell of Waimate, a widower with two daughters, and Pih–Chang lived with the family.

She attended primary school in Waimate, then high school at Otago Girls High School. She graduated MBChB from the University of Otago in 1929.

== Career ==
On graduation Pih–Chang took up a position as a house surgeon in Oamaru for a year. She was ordained as a missionary in Dunedin in 1930 and later that year she returned to China as a Presbyterian Church missionary. After learning Cantonese she worked at the Kong Cheun Hospital which was run by the Canton Villages Mission from 1930 to 1935. She performed a wide range of medical duties including surgery, caring for maternity cases and treating infectious diseases.

She studied ophthalmology at Moorfields Eye Hospital in London from 1935, graduating with a Diploma in Ophthalmic Medicine and Surgery in 1937. When she returned to China the Japanese had begun to bomb Canton (now Guangzhou) but Pih–Chang continued to work.

In 1938 Pih–Chang married Francis Chang in Hong Kong. The couple taught at the medical school at St John's University in Shanghai where Chang was Professor of Anatomy and remained there for twelve years. They spent a year in New Zealand from 1946 to 1947 where Chang lectured in anatomy at the University of Otago Medical School. They returned to China but conditions were difficult under the Communist government, especially for academics, so in 1950 they left China. They settled in Singapore for five years where they both taught at the University of Malaya.

In 1955 they moved to Hong Kong where Chang was Professor of Anatomy at Hong Kong University. Pih–Chang took up a role as a medical missionary at the Kwun Tong Peace Clinic treating the homeless and destitute, and refugees from China.

The Changs returned to New Zealand in 1969, retiring to Tauranga. Pih–Chang continued to work as an Honorary Medical Practitioner.

== Personal life ==
Pih–Chang was naturalised as a New Zealander in 1928. Only two Chinese were naturalised between 1904 and 1951.

In 1938 she married Francis Chang a professor of anatomy at St John's University in Shanghai. He died in Tauranga in 1978.

Pih–Chang died in Tauranga in February 1991.
