= John Scott (medical school dean) =

New Zealand university professor, artist, medical school dean (1851 - 1914)

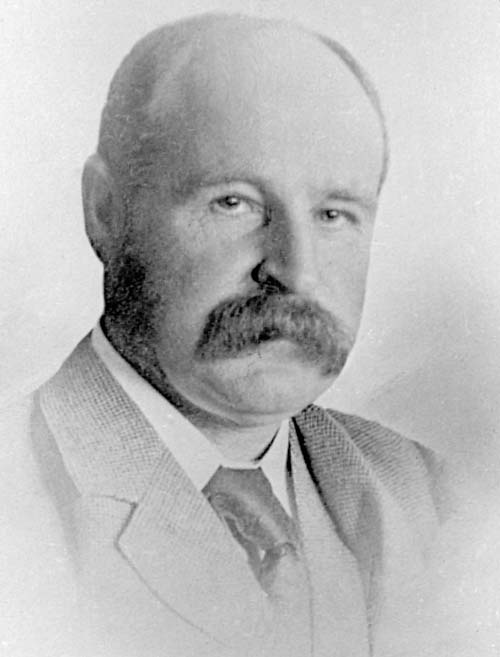
Scott in 1885

Prof John Halliday Scott FRSE (28 December 1851 – 25 February 1914) was a Scottish-born New Zealand university professor, artist and medical school dean.

== Early life and education ==
He was born John Lidderdale Scott at 13 Drummond Place in Edinburgh, Scotland in 1851. His parents were Marion Shaw Lidderdale and Andrew Scott (WS).

He was educated at Edinburgh Institution and then studied medicine at the University of Edinburgh, graduating with an MB ChB in 1874. He then went on to take the Membership of the Royal College of Surgeons postgraduate diploma in 1876. The adoption of the middle name "Halliday" appears a homage to his university professor: John Halliday Croom.

== Career ==
He obtained a position as House Surgeon at the Royal Infirmary of Edinburgh then Stirling Royal Infirmary. He returned to Edinburgh as a Demonstrator in Anatomy 1876/77 and obtained his doctorate (M.D.) in 1877. He was elected as a Fellow of the Royal Society of Edinburgh in May 1880. His proposers were Sir Charles Wyville Thomson, Sir William Turner, Daniel John Cunningham and Sir John Murray.

Scott practiced in Scotland for a time before he was appointed Professor of Anatomy and Physiology at the University of Otago in 1877. He sailed to New Zealand on SS Ringarooma arriving on 27 July 1877. His first home in Dunedin was a semi-detached house on St David Street (later named Scott Street in his honour).

He was appointed Dean of Medicine in 1891 remaining in the post until his death in 1914.

== Personal life ==
In 1882 he returned to Britain during the summer vacation (winter in UK) and in January 1883 married Helen Gardner Bealey (d.1899) in Cheltenham. She returned with him to New Zealand and they had two daughters and three sons. One son was Robert Hannay Scott who was killed in action at the Somme in World War I.

He joined the Otago Art Society and was its Secretary for 30 years and was a member of the Otago Institute.

After a series of small strokes he died of a cerebral haemorrhage in Dunedin on 25 February 1914.

== Artistic works ==
Scott was a gifted artist and also a competent photographer.

- Lusitania Bay (1880)
- Moeraki Builders (1889)

== Publications ==
- Contribution to the Osteology of the Aborigines of New Zealand and of the Chatham Islands. Transactions and Proceedings of the Royal Society of New Zealand, Volume 26, 1893.
