= Daisy Platts-Mills =

New Zealand doctor

Daisy Elizabeth Platts-Mills (1868 – 1 August 1956) was a New Zealand medical doctor and community leader. She was the first woman medical doctor in private practice and served on numerous community organisations, particularly those concerned with the health and welfare of women and children.

== Early life and education ==
Platts-Mills was born as Elizabeth Platts in Sandridge, Victoria, Australia in 1868, emigrating with her family to Port Chalmers, New Zealand in 1880. She attended Otago Girls' High School and the University of Otago Medical School, graduating in 1900.

Platts-Mills, Constance Frost and Jane Kinder were the third women medical graduates in New Zealand after Emily Siedeberg and Margaret Cruickshank.

== Career ==
Platts-Mills moved to Wellington in 1901 where she established herself as the country's first woman doctor in private practice. In 1912 the King Edward VII Memorial Children's Hospital was opened at Wellington Hospital. The hospital advertised for 'lady physicians' and Platts-Mills and Dr Agnes Bennett were appointed to the positions. She gave up private practice in 1915 to become the first woman medical officer to the Public Service Commission, with responsibility for the health and welfare of women in the public service.

As well as her medical career Platts-Mills served on numerous boards and community organisations, particularly those connected with women and children: Wellington Hospital and Charitable Aid Board, the St John Ambulance, the Plunket Society, the League of Mothers, the Mothers Union, the Women's National Reserve of New Zealand, the YWCA, the Social Hygiene Society and the Independent Order of Oddfellows. She worked for the St John Ambulance as Wellington Divisional Surgeon and was made an officer of the order of St John. She was first president of the Plunket Society in Wellington. Both the Plunket Society and the Social Hygiene Society moved to take practical action on health and social needs from a public health perspective and such groups looked to woman doctors for their professional knowledge and status in dealing with government agencies.

Platts-Mills was also very active in her local suburb of Karori, in particular serving the community during the 1918 influenza epidemic.

Platts-Mills retired in 1934.

== Personal life ==
Platts-Mills married John Fortescue Wright Mills in 1902. They had two sons and a daughter: E.W. Platts-Mills, John Platts-Mills who became a British Labour Party politician and barrister, and Adah Platts-Mills who was a doctor.

She died in Auckland on 1 August 1956.

== Publications ==
- Platts-Mills, D. (1917). Social diseases : What women should know about them - and why. Wellington, N.Z.: Dept. of Public Health, New Zealand.
- Platts-Mills, D. (1920). Gifts. Wellington [N.Z.]: C.M. Banks.
