= 1939 New Year Honours =

Appointments by King George VI of the United Kingdom to various orders and honours

The 1939 New Year Honours were appointments by King George VI to various orders and honours to reward and highlight good works by citizens of the United Kingdom and British Empire. They were announced on 30 December 1938.

The recipients of honours are displayed here as they were styled before their new honour, and arranged by honour, with classes (Knight, Knight Grand Cross, etc.) and then divisions (Military, Civil, etc.) as appropriate.

== United Kingdom and Colonies ==
=== Barons ===
- The Right Honourable Sir (Frederick) Arthur Greer, Lately a Lord Justice of Appeal.
- Colonel Sir Maurice Pascal Alers Hankey, GCB GCMG GCVO DCL Lately Secretary to the Cabinet and to the Committee of Imperial Defence.
- Cecil Bisshopp Harmsworth, For political and public services.
- Sir Laurence Richard Philipps, Bt JP For political and public services.

=== Privy Counsellors ===
- Richard Austen Butler, MP Member of Parliament for the Saffron Walden Division of Essex since May 1929. Parliamentary Under-Secretary of State for Foreign Affairs since February 1938. Parliamentary Secretary, Ministry of Labour, May 1937 to February 1938. Parliamentary Undersecretary of State for India, September 1932 – 1937.
- Captain Harry Frederick Comfort Crookshank, MP Member of Parliament for the Gainsborough division of Lincolnshire since October 1924. Parliamentary Secretary, Mines Department since June 1935. Parliamentary Under-Secretary of State, Home Office, June 1934 to June 1935.

=== Baronets ===
- John Donald Pollock, OBE CM DL For benefactions and services to education.
- Sir (William) Peter Rylands, JP For political and public services in Lancashire and Cheshire.

=== Knights Bachelor ===
- Adolphe Abrahams, OBE FRCP Consulting Physician. Dean of the Medical School, Westminster Hospital.
- Francis Adams Beane. For political and public services.
- Captain Thomas Andrews Bradford, DSO DL For political and public services in the County of Durham.
- Councillor Ernest Robert Canning, JP For political and public services in Birmingham.
- Alderman Charles Henry Cartwright, JP For political and public services in Bournemouth.
- William Chamberlain, Chairman of Traffic Commissioners, North-Western Area, Ministry of Transport.
- Alfred Rowland Clegg, JP For political and public services in Shropshire.
- Alderman Gilfrid Gordon Craig, JP DL For political and public services in Middlesex.
- Councillor William Henry Crosthwaite, JP For political and public services in Middlesbrough.
- Reginald Charles Davies. For political and public services in Leeds.
- Gerald Dodson, JP Recorder of the City of London.
- William Lindsay Everard, JP DL MP Member of Parliament for the Melton Division of Leicestershire since October, 1924. For political and public services.
- Major John St. Vigor Fox, JP DL For political and public services in the Counties of Lincoln and Lindsey.
- Edward James George, Director and General Manager, the Consett Iron Company, Ltd.
- Alderman Henry Tom Hancock, JP For political and public services in the Waterloo Division of Lancashire.
- John George Hay. For public services as a member of the International Rubber Regulation Committee.
- Ernest Arthur Jelf. King's Remembrancer and Senior Master of the Supreme Court.
- John Wheen Kynoch, JP DL For political and public services in the East of Scotland.
- Adam Maitland, MP Member of Parliament for the Faversham Division of Kent since 1928. For political and public services.
- Frederick Masters, JP For political and public services in the East End of London.
- Robert Mayer, For services to music, especially in the organisation of concerts for young people.
- Frank James Pearce, Past President of the British Dental Association. Consulting Dental Surgeon to Guy's Hospital.
- John Pierce. For political and public services.
- Stephen Joseph Pigott, Managing Director of Messrs. John Brown and Company, Clydebank.
- Lieutenant-Colonel Heaton Forbes Robinson, CMG MInstCE Lately Director of Works, Imperial War Graves Commission.
- Robert Robinson, FRS Waynflete Professor of Chemistry in the University of Oxford.
- Will Spens, CBE JP Master of Corpus Christi College, Cambridge. For public services.
- Reginald George Stapledon, CBE Professor of Agricultural Botany, University College of Wales and Director of the Welsh Plant Breeding Station, Aberystwyth.
- Lieutenant-Colonel Frank Augustus Douglas Stevens, CBE DL Chief Constable of Bedfordshire.
- Edgar William Thew. Chief Inspector, Board of Customs and Excise.
- Harry Sheil Elster Vanderpant, Chairman, London and Home Counties Traffic Advisory Committee.
- Harry Vincent, For public and philanthropic services in Birmingham.
- John Ballingall Forbes Watson, Director of the National Confederation of Employers' Organisations.
- Hugh Calthrop Webster, Official Arbitrator under the Acquisition of Land (Assessment of Compensation) Act, 1919.
- Stanley Charles Wyatt, Representative of the Council of Foreign Bondholders on the Council of the Repartitioned Debt of the former Ottoman Empire.

Dominions

- William Dixson, a well-known collector of Australiana. For public and philanthropic services in the State of New South Wales.
- The Honourable Walter Gordon Duncan, MLC President of the Royal Agricultural and Horticultural Society, State of South Australia.
- The Honourable George Louis Goudie, MLC Commissioner of Public Works, Minister in charge of Immigration, and Vice-President of the Board of Land and Works, State of Victoria.
- George Shaw Knowles, CBE Solicitor-General, Secretary to the Attorney General's Department and Parliamentary Draftsman, Commonwealth of Australia.
- Charles Manley Luke. For public services in the Dominion of New Zealand.
- The Honourable Henry Hubert Ostler, Senior Puisne Judge of the Supreme Court, Dominion of New Zealand.
- John Ramsay, CBE FRACS For services to surgery in the Commonwealth of Australia.

India and Burma

- John Minty Baguley, Indian Civil Service, Puisne Judge of the High Court of Judicature at Rangoon.
- Arthur Trevor Harries, Chief Justice of the High Court of Judicature at Patna, Bihar.
- Chettur Madhavan Nayar, Puisne Judge of the High Court of Judicature at Fort St. George, Madras.
- Edward Bennet, Indian Civil Service, Puisne Judge of the High Court of Judicature at Allahabad, United Provinces.
- Sitaram Sunderrao Patkar, lately Puisne Judge of the High Court of Judicature at Bombay, Bombay.
- Eyre Gordon, CSI CIE Indian Civil Service, Chairman of the Federal Public Service Commission.
- Alan Hubert Lloyd, CSI CIE Indian Civil Service, lately Member, Central Board of Revenue, Government of India.
- Walter Lawrence Scott, CIE Indian Civil Service, Member, Revenue Tribunal, Assam.
- Colonel Alexander James Hutchinson Russell, CBE KHS , Indian Medical Service, Public Health Commissioner with the Government of India.
- Major Henry George Howard, CIE MC Chief Engineer for Electricity, Madras.
- Captain Ernest Whiteside Huddleston, CIE CBE RIN (retired), Shipping Surveyor and Adviser, Office of the High Commissioner for India.
- Colonel Krishnaji Vishnoo Kukday, CIE Indian Medical Service (retired), Central Provinces and Berar.
- Rai Bahadur Pandit Seetla Prasad Bajpai, CIE Judicial Minister and Chief Justice, Jaipur State, Rajputana.
- Ardeshir Rustamji Dalai, Indian Civil Service (retired), Partner and Director, Messrs. Tata & Sons, and President, Indian Chamber of Commerce, Calcutta.
- Henry Horsman, MC Managing Director of the Swadeshi Cotton Mills, Cawnpore, and President of the Upper India Chamber of Commerce, United Provinces.
- James Reid Kay, Partner, Messrs. James Finlay & Company, Calcutta, Bengal.
- Nawab Shah Nawaz Khan, Member, Legislative Assembly, Punjab.

Colonies, Protectorates, etc.

- Arthur Kirwan Agar, Colonial Legal Service, Chief Justice, British Honduras.
- Joseph Terence De La Mothe, OBE For public services in Grenada.
- Professor William Wilson Jameson, FRCP Dean and Professor of Public Health, London School of Hygiene and Tropical Medicine.
- Percy Alexander McElwaine, Colonial Legal Service, Chief Justice, Straits Settlements.
- Jayatilaka Cudah Ratwatte. For public services in Ceylon.

=== The Most Honourable Order of the Bath ===
==== Knights Grand Cross of the Order of the Bath (GCB) ====
Military Division

Royal Navy

- Admiral Sir Alfred Dudley Pickman Rogers Pound, GCVO KCB

Army

- General Sir Walter Mervyn St. George Kirke, KCB CMG DSO Colonel Commandant, Royal Artillery, Aide-de-Camp General to The King, Director General of the Territorial Army, The War Office.

==== Knights Commander of the Order of the Bath (KCB) ====
Military Division

Royal Navy

- Vice-Admiral Andrew Browne Cunningham, CB DSO
- Vice-Admiral Max Kennedy Horton, CB DSO
- Lieutenant-General William Wellington Godfrey, CB CMG RM

Army

- Lieutenant-General Walter King Venning, CB CMG CBE MC Colonel, The Duke of Cornwall's Light Infantry, Quarter-Master-General to the Forces designate.
- Lieutenant-General Archibald Percival Wavell, CB CMG MC late The Black Watch (Royal Highland Regiment), General Officer Commanding-in-Chief, Southern Command.
- Lieutenant-General Clive Gerard Liddell, CB CMG CBE DSO late The Leicestershire Regiment, Adjutant-General to the Forces, The War Office.

Civil Division

- Honorary Colonel Benjamin Hansford, CB DL 54th (City of London) Anti-Aircraft Brigade, Royal Artillery, Territorial Army.
- Edward Ettingdene Bridges, MC Secretary of the Cabinet and Permanent Secretary, Offices of the Cabinet, Committee of Imperial Defence, Economic Advisory Council and Minister for Co-ordination of Defence.
- Sir Alexander Maxwell, KBE CB Permanent Under-Secretary of State, Home Office.

==== Companions of the Order of the Bath (CB) ====
Military Division

Royal Navy

- Rear-Admiral Norman Atherton Wodehouse.
- Rear-Admiral Bruce Austin Fraser, OBE
- Rear-Admiral Lancelot Ernest Holland.
- Engineer Rear-Admiral Thomas Herbert Warde.
- Surgeon Rear-Admiral Francis Jollie Gowans, KHS
- Captain John Henry Godfrey, RN

Army

- Lieutenant-General Sir Ronald Forbes Adam, Bt DSO OBE late Royal Artillery, Deputy Chief of the Imperial General Staff, The War Office.
- Major-General Frederick Duke Gwynne Howell, DSO MC late Royal Army Medical Corps, Honorary Surgeon to the King, Deputy Director of Medical Services, Aldershot Command.
- Major-General Edmund Archibald Osborne, DSO Colonel Commandant, Royal Corps of Signals, Commander, 44th (Home Counties) Division, Territorial Army.
- Major-General Percy Cleghorn Stanley Hobart, DSO OBE MC late Royal Engineers and Royal Tank Corps, Commander, Mobile Division, Egypt.
- Major-General Philip Neame, VC DSO late Royal Engineers, Commandant (Major-General, General Staff) Royal Military Academy at Woolwich.
- Major-General George Guy Waterhouse, MC late Royal Engineers, Inspector-General and Military Adviser, Ministry of Defence, Iraq Army.
- Major-General James Syme Drew, DSO MC late The Queen's Own Cameron Highlanders, Commander, 5and (Lowland) Division, Territorial Army.
- Colonel (temporary Brigadier) Harold Cecil Harrison, DSO late Royal Marines, Royal Marine Artillery, The East Yorkshire Regiment (The Duke of York's Own) and The Green Howards (Alexandra, Princess of Wales's Own Yorkshire Regiment), Commander, I4th Infantry Brigade.
- Colonel Frank Noel Mason-MacFarlane, MC late Royal Artillery, Military Attache (graded as General Staff Officer, 1st grade), Berlin.
- Colonel (temporary Brigadier) John Fullerton Evetts, CBE MC late The Cameronians (Scottish Rifles) and The Royal Ulster Rifles, Commander, 16th Infantry Brigade.
- Major-General Cyril Dupré Noyes, CIE MC Indian Army, Commander, 2nd (Rawalpindi) Infantry Brigade, India.
- Colonel (temporary Brigadier) Lewis Macclesfield Heath, CIE DSO MC Indian Army, Commander, Wana Brigade, India.

Royal Air Force

- Air Vice-Marshal John Tremayne Babington, CBE DSO Royal Air Force.
- Air Vice-Marshal Charles Frederick Algernon Portal, DSO MC Royal Air Force.

Civil Division

- Captain John Rustat Hemsted, VD RNVR
- Lieutenant-Colonel George Haddon Bower, TD Chairman, Territorial Army Association of the County of Kincardine.
- Honorary Colonel Sir Watkin Randle Kynaston Mainwaring, CBE DL Chairman, Territorial Army Association of the County of Flint.
- Major John Hayes Simonds, DL Chairman, Territorial Army Association of the County of Berkshire.
- Thomas James Cash, Director of Finance and Assistant Under-Secretary of State, War Office.
- Alban Tabor Austin Dobson, CVO CBE Fisheries Secretary, Ministry of Agriculture and Fisheries.
- Harold Eastwood, Principal Assistant Secretary, Admiralty.
- Cyril Thomas Flower, FSA Deputy Keeper of Public Records, Public Record Office.
- William Robert Fraser, Principal Assistant Secretary, Treasury.
- Frank Trelawny Arthur Ashton-Gwatkin, CMG Counsellor, Foreign Office.
- William George Hynard, CBE Director of Sea Transport, Mercantile Marine Department, Board of Trade.
- Frederic William Metcalfe, Clerk Assistant, House of Commons.
- Joseph Sinclair Nicholson, CBE Principal Assistant Secretary, Ministry of Labour.
- William Strang, CMG MBE Counsellor, Foreign Office.

=== Order of Merit ===
- Admiral of the Fleet Alfred Ernle Montacute, Baron Chatfield, GCB KCMG CVO
- Sir James Hopwood Jeans, FRS

=== The Most Exalted Order of the Star of India ===
==== Knights Commander (KCSI) ====
- Reginald Maitland Maxwell, CSI CIE Indian Civil Service, Member of the Governor-General's Executive Council.
- Maharana Shri Bhavani Sinhji Bahadur, Maharana of Danta, Rajputana.
- Thakor Saheb Shri Sir Bahadursinhji Mansinhji, KCIE Thakor Saheb of Palitana, States of Western India.

==== Companions (CSI) ====
- Percy William Marsh, CIE Indian Civil Service, Junior Member, Board of Revenue, United Provinces.
- James Alexander Dawson, CIE Indian Civil Service, Chief Secretary to the Government of Assam.
- Janardan Atmaram Madan, CIE Indian Civil Service, First Grade Commissioner, Bombay.
- Hugh Meggison Hood, CIE Indian Civil Service, Secretary to the Government of Madras in the Home Department, Madras.

=== The Most Distinguished Order of Saint Michael and Saint George ===
==== Knights Grand Cross of the Order of St Michael and St George (GCMG) ====
- Sir Campbell Stuart, KBE Chairman and United Kingdom Representative, Imperial Communications Advisory Committee. Treasurer of King George's Trust and of King George's Fields Foundation. For public services.
- Malcolm, Baron Hailey, GCSI GCIE Director, African Research Survey.
- The Honourable Sir Alexander Montagu George Cadogan, KCMG CB Permanent Under-Secretary of State for Foreign Affairs.
- The Right Honourable Sir Nevile Meyrick Henderson, KCMG His Majesty's Ambassador Extraordinary and Plenipotentiary at Berlin.

==== Knights Commander of the Order of St Michael and St George (KCMG) ====
- Cecil George Graves, MC Deputy Director-General of the British Broadcasting Corporation. For public services.
- Eric Gustav Machtig, CMG OBE Assistant Under-Secretary of State, Dominions Office.
- The Honourable Hayden Erskine Starke, Puisne Judge of the High Court of the Commonwealth of Australia.
- Walter Booth-Gravely, CSI CIE Indian Civil Service, Counsellor to the Governor of Burma.
- Sir Algernon Edward Aspinall, CMG CBE lately Secretary to the West India Committee.
- Sir Harry Charles Luke, CMG Governor and Commander-in-Chief of the Colony of Fiji, and High Commissioner for the Western Pacific.
- John Alexander Maybin, CMG Governor and Commander-in-Chief of the Territory of Northern Rhodesia.
- Thomas St Quintin Hill, CMG OBE Comptroller-General of the Department of Overseas Trade.
- Basil Cochrane Newton, CMG His Majesty's Envoy Extraordinary and Minister Plenipotentiary at Prague.

Honorary Knights Commander

- His Highness Sultan Abdul Aziz Al'Mu'Tassim Bil'lah Shah, Sultan of Perak, Federated Malay States.

==== Companions of the Order of St Michael and St George (CMG) ====
- Arthur Telford Donnelly, For public services in the Dominion of New Zealand.
- Thomas Donald Horn Hall, FRS of the House of Representatives, Dominion of New Zealand.
- Frank Victor Gordon Scholes, Medical Superintendent of the Infectious Diseases Hospital, Fairfield, State of Victoria.
- Joseph Charles Westhoven, Public service Arbitrator, Commonwealth of Australia.
- Henry Osborne Reynolds, Indian Civil Service, Financial Commissioner, Burma.
- Christopher Dominic Ahearne, Colonial Administrative Service, Federal Secretary, Federated Malay States.
- John Alexander Calder, Assistant Secretary, Colonial Office.
- William Harold Ingrams, OBE Colonial Administrative Service, Resident Adviser, Mukalla, Aden Protectorate.
- William Marston Logan, OBE Colonial Administrative Service, Chief Secretary, Northern Rhodesia.
- Enroll Aubrey Neff, Colonial Medical Service, Director of Medical Services, Cyprus.
- Harris Rendell Oke, MC Colonial Administrative Service, Colonial Secretary, Gambia.
- John Ninian Oliphant, Director of the Imperial Forestry Institute.
- Geoffrey Gay Shute, Colonial Administrative Service, Senior Resident, Nigeria.
- Douglas Griffith Tomblings, Colonial Education Service, Principal, Makerere College, Kampala, Uganda Protectorate.
- Brodrick Ashton Warner, Colonial Administrative Service, Provincial Commissioner, Uganda Protectorate.
- Frederick Edward Fox Adam, His Majesty's Envoy Extraordinary and Minister Plenipotentiary at Panama.
- Thomas Kenneth Bewley, Financial Adviser to His Majesty's Embassy at Washington.
- Wilfred Bertram Cunningham, Japanese Counsellor at His Majesty's Embassy at Tokyo.
- Frederick Robert Hoyer Millar, CVO Assistant Private Secretary to His Majesty's Principal Secretary of State for Foreign Affairs.
- Ivone Augustine Kirkpatrick, until recently First Secretary at His Majesty's Embassy at Berlin.
- Francis Dudley Rugman, MC Financial Secretary to the Sudan Government.
- Francis Hugh William Stonehewer Bird, OBE His Majesty's Consul-General at Addis Ababa.
- John Monro Troutbeck, First Secretary at His Majesty's Legation at Prague.

=== Order of the Indian Empire ===
==== Knights Grand Commander (GCIE) ====
- Lieutenant-Colonel His Highness Maharaja Jam Shri Sir Digvijaysinhji Ranjitsinhji Jadeja, KCSI ADC, Maharaja Jam Saheb of Nawanagar, States of Western India.

==== Knights Commander (KCIE) ====
- Malcolm Lyall Darling, CIE Indian Civil Service, Financial Commissioner, Punjab.
- Joseph Hugh Garrett, CSI Indian Civil Service, First Grade Commissioner, Bombay, and lately Acting Governor of Sind.
- Gilbert Pitcairn Hogg, CSI CIE Indian Civil Service, Chief Secretary to the Government of Bengal, and lately Acting Governor of Assam.

==== Companions (CIE) ====
- James Drummond Anderson, Indian Civil Service, lately Temporary Additional Secretary to the Government of India in the Defence Department.
- Rai Bahadur Purshortam Lall Dhawan, Member of the Federal Public Service Commission.
- Major-General Norman Methuen Wilson, OBE Indian Medical Service, Surgeon-General with the Government of Madras.
- David Norman Strathie, Indian Civil Service, Member, Board of Revenue, Madras.
- Frank D'Souza, Officiating Member, Railway Board (Railway Department), Government of India.
- Fazal Ibrahim Rahimtoola, President, Indian Tariff Board.
- Raja Durga Singh, Raja of Baghat, Punjab States.
- Colonel (Temporary Brigadier) Philip Mortimer, Indian Army, Inspector, Royal Indian Army Service Corps.
- Colonel (Temporary Brigadier) Ernest Frederick Steell Dawson, MC British Service, Chief Engineer, Western Command, India.
- Gerald Snowden Butler, FIC Indian Ordnance Services, Officiating Director of Ordnance Factories, India.
- Louis Reginald Fawcus, Indian Civil Service, Officiating Commissioner of a Division, Bengal.
- Ferdinand Blyth Wace, Indian Civil Service, Officiating Commissioner, Ambala, Punjab.
- Lionel Westropp Jardine, Indian Civil Service, Revenue and Divisional Commissioner, North-West Frontier Province.
- Anthony Lockhart Binney, Indian Civil Service, Officiating Commissioner, Berar Division, Central Provinces and Berar.
- Panna Lall, Indian Civil Service, Commissioner, Allahabad Division, United Provinces.
- Eric Rawlinson Wood, Indian Civil Service, Officiating Chief Secretary to the Government of Orissa, Orissa.
- John Wardle Houlton, Indian Civil service, Secretary to the Government of Bihar in the Revenue Department, Bihar.
- William Burns, Indian Agricultural Service, Agricultural Expert to the Government of India in the Imperial Council of Agricultural Research Department.
- Ralph Somerville Weir, Indian Educational Service, Director of Public Instruction and Deputy Secretary, to the Government in the Education Department, United Provinces.
- Lieutenant-Colonel Wolseley de Haga Haig, DSO RE Indian Service of Engineers, Chief Engineer, Public Works Department, Buildings and Roads Branch, United Provinces.
- Arthur Clifford Hiley, Indian Forest Service, Chief Conservator of Forests, Bombay.
- Captain Ralph Montague Philby, RIN Nautical Adviser to the Government of India.
- Horace Barratt Dunnicliff, Indian Educational Service, Chief Chemist, Central Revenues Chemical Service, and Principal, Government College, Lahore.
- Lieutenant-Colonel James Bennett Hance, OBE FRCSE LRCP Indian Medical Service, Residency Surgeon in Mysore, Bangalore.
- Lieutenant-Colonel Gordon Covell, DTM&H Indian Medical Service, Director, Malaria Survey of India.
- Lieutenant-Colonel Mathew George Platts, OBE MC Indian Service of Engineers, Superintending Engineer, Electricity Department, Madras.
- Lieutenant-Colonel Ernest William O'Gorman Kirwan, FRCSI Indian Medical Service, Professor of Ophthalmic Surgery, Medical College, Calcutta, Bengal.
- John Frederick Gennings, CBE Commissioner of Labour, Commissioner for Workmen's Compensation and Director of Information, Bombay.

=== The Royal Victorian Order ===
==== Knights Grand Cross of the Royal Victorian Order (GCVO) ====
- The Right Honourable George Charles, Earl of Lucan, KBE CB TD
- Sir John Charles Walsham Reith, GBE DCL

==== Knights Commander of the Royal Victorian Order (KCVO) ====
- Brigadier-General Lord Esmé Charles Gordon-Lennox, CMG DSO MVO

==== Commanders of the Royal Victorian Order (CVO) ====
- Captain Charles Edward Lambe, RN (dated 28 September 1938).
- Ashton Davies, OBE
- Brigadier-General Robert Harvey Kearsley, CMG DSO
- Herbert Ryle, MVO OBE
- Lady Katharine Seymour.
- Lieutenant-Colonel Thomas Anson Thornton
- Charles Paul Wilson, FRCS

==== Members of the Royal Victorian Order, 4th class (MVO) ====
- Bertram Cohen,
- Edward Septimus Courroux, MVO
- Captain James Gordon Paterson.
- John Purves Martin Joseph Richards, MVO

==== Members of the Royal Victorian Order, 5th class (MVO) ====
- Percy Collins
- William Robert Cousins
- Richard Donald Cross
- Lieutenant Francis Vivian Dunn, Director of Music, Royal Marines.
- Samuel Stephen Page
- Egbert Edwin Ratcliffe
- John Willert
- Ann Jean Williams

=== The Most Excellent Order of the British Empire ===
==== Knights Grand Cross of the Order of the British Empire (GBE) ====
- Sir Frank Edward Smith, KCB CBE FRS Secretary of the Department of Scientific and Industrial Research. Lately Secretary of the Royal Society.
- Lieutenant-Colonel Sir George Stewart Symes, KCMG KBE DSO Governor-General of the Anglo-Egyptian Sudan.

==== Dames Commander of the Order of the British Empire (DBE) ====
- Edith Mary Winifred, Baroness Hillingdon. For political and public services.
- Ellen Mary Musson, CBE RRC Chairman of the General Nursing Council for England and Wales.

==== Knights Commander of the Order of the British Empire (KBE) ====
- Walter Raymond Birchall, CB Deputy Director General, General Post Office.
- Major the Honourable Edward Cecil George Cadogan, CB JP Member of Parliament for Reading, 1922–23, and for Finchley, 1924-35. Deputy Chairman of the National Fitness Council for England and Wales. Chairman of the Departmental Committee on Corporal Punishment. For political and public services.
- Leonard Twiston Davies, OBE JP DL For political and public services in Monmouthshire.
- Sir David Allan Hay, OBE JP Chairman Scottish Special Areas Housing Association and lately Commissioner for the Special Areas in Scotland.
- Edward Goldie Howarth, CB CBE Deputy Secretary, Board of Education.
- John Armitage Stainton, Second Parliamentary Counsel to the Treasury.
- Lieutenant-Colonel William Kerr Fraser-Tytler, CMG MC His Majesty's Envoy Extraordinary and Minister Plenipotentiary at Kabul.
- George Sinclair Moss, CBE until recently His Majesty's Consul-General at Hankow

Colonies, Protectorates, etc.

- Reginald Marcus Clark. For public services in the Commonwealth of Australia.
- The Honourable Henry Edward Manning, KC MLC Attorney-General and Vice-President of the Executive Council, State of New South Wales.
- Khan Bahadur Nawab Sir Liaqat Hyat Khan, OBE Prime Minister, Patiala State, Punjab States.
- Alexander Sym Small, CMG Colonial Administrative Service, Colonial Secretary; Straits Settlements.

==== Commanders of the Order of the British Empire (CBE) ====
Military Division

Royal Navy

- Engineer Rear-Admiral Henry William Wildish.
- Captain Frederick Rodney Garside, RN
- The Reverend John Walter Barnwell Moore, RN

Army

- Lieutenant-Colonel and Brevet Colonel John Ewart Trounce Barbary, OBE TD Royal Artillery, Territorial Army, Officer Commanding 56th (Cornwall) Anti-Aircraft Brigade, Royal Artillery, Territorial Army.
- Colonel John Bernard Gawthorpe, Territorial Army, (Major, retired pay, Regular Army Reserve of Officers, The West Yorkshire Regiment (The Prince of Wales's Own)), late Officer Commanding 7th (Leeds Rifles) Battalion, The West Yorkshire Regiment (The Prince of Wales's Own), Territorial Army.
- Colonel (local Brigadier) Reginald Hewlett, DSO MC Inspector-General of the West Indian Local Forces, and Officer Commanding the Troops, Jamaica.
- Colonel Arthur Morrell Johnson, MC TD Territorial Army, Assistant Director of Medical Services, 42nd (East Lancashire) Division, Territorial Army.
- Colonel (temporary Brigadier) Hanbury Pawle, OBE Territorial Army, (Captain, retired pay, late The Royal Berkshire Regiment (Princess Charlotte of Wales's)), Commander, 161st (Essex) Infantry Brigade, Territorial Army.
- Colonel William Albert Robertson, MC Territorial Army, Assistant Director of Medical Services, 51st (Highland) Division, Territorial Army.
- Colonel Vernon Ashton Hobart Sturdee, DSO OBE Australian Staff Corps, Director of Staff Duties, Army Headquarters, Australian Military Forces.
- Honorary Colonel George Lestock Thornton, MC TD 43rd (Wessex) Divisional Royal Army Medical Corps, Territorial Army, (Colonel, retired, late Territorial Army).
- Colonel Ronald Morce Weeks, DSO MC Territorial Army, late Officer Commanding 5th Battalion, The South Lancashire Regiment, (The Prince of Wales's Volunteers), Territorial Army.

Royal Air Force

- Group Captain the Honourable Ralph Alexander Cochrane, AFC Royal Air Force.

Civil Division

- Horace Benjamin Allum, MVO OBE Controller of Supplies, H.M. Office of Works and Public Buildings.
- Cyril Edward Asquith. General Secretary of the National Labour Organisation. For political and public services.
- Lieutenant-Colonel Samuel Boyle, MC DL For public services in Chelsea.
- Westgarth Forster Brown, MInstCE MInstME Chief Mineral Adviser to the Commissioners of Crown Lands. Member of the Board of Governors of the Imperial Institute and of the Institute's Advisory Council on Minerals.
- Major Harry Ernest Chapman, OBE Chief Constable of Kent.
- William Bertram Chrimes, OBE JP Chairman of the Liverpool Local Employment Committee.
- William Christie Cowan. For political and public services in Scotland.
- Robert Crichton. Chairman of the West Cumberland Industrial Development Company.
- Arthur William Davies. Assistant Secretary, Board of Inland Revenue.
- John Harvey Davies. Clerk of the Peace and Clerk of the County Council, Flintshire.
- Eva Mary Eckersley. For political and public services in Lancashire.
- William John Cell. For services in connection with the production of official films.
- Rose Graham, FSA For services to research in mediaeval history.
- Alexander Gray, Professor of Political Economy in the University of Edinburgh.
- Arthur Stanley Griffith, Bacteriologist, Medical Research Council.
- Florence Horsbrugh, MBE MP Member of Parliament for Dundee since 1931. For political and public services.
- Herbert John Hutchinson, OBE Assistant Secretary, Import Duties Advisory Committee.
- Edward Johnston. For services to calligraphy.
- John Godwin King. For public services in East Sussex.
- William Oliphant MacArthur, Divisional Food Officer (North Midland Division) under the Board of Trade.
- Charles Hay Marshall, JP DL For public services in Dundee.
- Ernest Charles Martin, MBE Superintendent of County Courts.
- George McLeod Paterson, Principal Naval Architect to the Cunard White Star Steamship Company.
- Owen Glynne Roberts, OBE Secretary, the London Midland and Scottish Railway Company. On the occasion of the centenary of the Railway.
- John Clifford Rowe, JP FSS For political and public services in West Lewisham.
- Donald Maclean Skiffington, MBE Shipyard Director of Messrs. John Brown and Company, Clydebank.
- Frederick Charles Starling, Assistant Secretary, and Director of the Petroleum Department, Mines Department.
- Alderman John Ockelford Thompson, OBE JP DL For public services in Essex.
- Thomas Alfred Warren, Director of Education, Wolverhampton.

India

- Charlotte Leighton Houlton, (Eng.), Chief Medical Officer, Women's Medical Service, India.
- Sardar Narayanrao Ganpatrao Vinchurkar, First Class Sardar of the Deccan, Nasik, Bombay.
- Khan Bahadur Mian Ahmad Yar Khan Daultana, Landowner and Chief Whip of the Ministerial Party in the Punjab, Punjab.

Colonies, Protectorates, etc.

- Thomas Reginald Aickin, Private Secretary to the Minister of Finance, Dominion of New Zealand.
- Andrew Greene Carnell, Mayor of St. John's, Newfoundland.
- Joseph Aloysius Carrodus, Secretary, Department of the Interior, Commonwealth of Australia.
- The Honourable John William Cheek, MLC For public services in the State of Tasmania.
- Frederick William Marks, FCA (Aust.). For public services in the State of New South Wales.
- Arthur William Mulligan, General Secretary, National Centennial Office, Department of Internal Affairs, Dominion of New Zealand.
- Professor Walter Murdoch. For literary services to the Commonwealth of Australia.
- Andrew Barton Paterson. For literary services to the Commonwealth of Australia.
- James Livingstone Thompson, CM For public and social welfare services in the State of Victoria.
- Norman Henry Martin Bowden, OBE Ceylon Emigration Commissioner.
- Enroll Lionel Dos Santos, Treasurer, Trinidad.
- Lieutenant-Colonel Vivian Dykes, MBE RE lately Secretary, Oversea Defence Committee.
- William Atkinson Fell. For public services in Malaya.
- Richard McNeil Henderson, MInstCE MIMechE Director of Public Works, Hong Kong.
- Reginald Popham Nicholson, CMG lately Secretary, Royal African Society.
- The Right Reverend Charles Joseph Nicolas. For services to education in Fiji.
- John Trimingham Trimingham, OBE Colonial Treasurer, Bermuda.

Overseas Residents

- David Blair, a British subject resident in Valparaiso.
- Alfred Henry Ditchburn, OBE Administrative Inspector, Ministry of the Interior, Iraq.
- Lieutenant-Colonel Vivian Beaconsfield Gray, MC, a British subject residing in Cairo.
- William Seaton King, a British subject resident in Shanghai.
- William Henry Newman, a British subject resident in Antwerp.

Honorary Commanders

- Dato Mohamed Salleh bin Ali, State Secretary, Johore, Malay States.

==== Officers of the Order of the British Empire (OBE) ====
Military Division

Royal Navy

- Captain Henry Leonard Ivers Kirkpatrick, RN (Retired).
- Paymaster - Commander Charles Assheton Bowen, RN
- Lieutenant-Commander Hugh Charles Skinner, RN
- Captain William Foggie Keay, VD RNVR
- Commander Harold Leopold Quick, RAN (Auxiliary Services).

Army

- Lieutenant-Colonel and Brevet Colonel Richard Baron, TD Officer Commanding 55th (West Lancashire) Divisional Signals, Royal Corps of Signals, Territorial Army.
- Lieutenant-Colonel and Brevet Colonel Harold Powell Crosland, MC TD Territorial Army, late Officer Commanding 99th (Buckinghamshire and Berkshire Yeomanry) Army Field Brigade, Royal Artillery, Territorial Army.
- Major Stanley Herbert Crump, New Zealand Staff Corps. Deputy Quarter-Master-General and Director of Supplies and Transport, Army Headquarters, New Zealand Military Forces.
- Lieutenant (Quarter-Master) (local Captain) Richard Element, DCM Territorial Army Reserve of Officers, Staff Captain "Q", The Nigeria Regiment, Royal West African Frontier Force.
- Lieutenant-Colonel and Brevet Colonel William Allen Foulkes, TD late Officer Commanding, 2nd Cavalry Divisional Royal Army Service Corps, Territorial Army.
- Lieutenant-Colonel and Brevet Colonel Edward Norman Gardner, MC TD Officer Commanding 6th Battalion, The Gloucestershire Regiment, Territorial Army.
- Major Glyn Frank Jones, 18th King Edward VII's Own Cavalry, Indian Army, attached Burma Frontier Force.
- Lieutenant-Colonel Henry William Lucy, TD Officer Commanding 97th (Kent Yeomanry) Army Field Brigade, Royal Artillery, Territorial Army.
- Major John Oscar Lawrence Mason, 3rd Battalion, 2nd Punjab Regiment, Indian Army.
- Lieutenant-Colonel and Brevet Colonel Harold Frederick Pearson, ED Ceylon Mounted Rifles Reserve.
- Lieutenant-Colonel Rees Thomas Price, TD Royal Engineers, Territorial Army, Commander, Royal Engineers, 53rd (Welsh) Division, Territorial Army.
- Lieutenant-Colonel and Brevet Colonel Edward Birnie Reid, Officer Commanding, 51st (Highland) Divisional Signals, Royal Corps of Signals, Territorial Army.
- Major David St. Clair Riley, ED District Officer, No. 6 Military District Defence Force, Southern Rhodesia.
- Lieutenant-Colonel Wallace Roderick Duncan Robertson, MC TD Officer Commanding, 86th (East Anglian) (Herts Yeomanry) Field Brigade, Royal Artillery, Territorial Army.
- Lieutenant-Colonel and Brevet Colonel William Keir Rodger, TD Officer Commanding, 7th Battalion, The Cameronians (Scottish Rifles), Territorial Army.
- Major and Brevet Lieutenant-Colonel Robert Wise Richardson Scott, TD The Yorkshire Hussars (Alexandra, Princess of Wales's Own), Yeomanry, Territorial Army.
- Lieutenant-Colonel and Brevet Colonel Eric Ashley Shipton, MC TD Officer Commanding, 90th (City of London) Field Brigade, Royal Artillery, Territorial Army.
- Lieutenant-Colonel Alick Drummond Buchanan Smith, Officer Commanding, 5th-7th (Buchan, Mar and Mearns) Battalion, The Gordon Highlanders, Territorial Army.
- Lieutenant-Colonel Rupert Frank Smith, MC Australian Corps of Signals, Officer Commanding Signals 2nd Division, 2nd Military District, Australian Military Forces.
- Lieutenant-Colonel and Brevet Colonel John Snowden Spencer, MC TD Officer Commanding, 6th Battalion, The Duke of Wellington's Regiment (West Riding), Territorial Army.
- Lieutenant-Colonel and Brevet Colonel Richard Douglas Sutcliffe, DSO Officer Commanding, 10th (3rd City of London) Battalion, The Royal Fusiliers (City of London Regiment), Territorial Army.
- Lieutenant-Colonel Geoffrey George Hetley Symes, TD Officer Commanding, Dorsetshire Heavy Brigade, Royal Artillery, Territorial Army.
- Major Lechmere Cay Thomas, MC The Royal Northumberland Fusiliers, Officer Commanding, 2nd Battalion, The King's African Rifles.
- Lieutenant-Colonel and Brevet Colonel Richard Barker Ullman, MC TD Territorial Army, late Officer Commanding, 64th (7th London) Field Brigade, Royal Artillery, Territorial Army.
- Lieutenant-Colonel and Brevet Colonel Charles Walker, TD retired, late Officer Commanding, 50th (Northumbrian) Divisional Royal Army Service Corps, Territorial Army.
- Major Douglas Leslie Oswald Woods, 2nd Battalion, 13th Frontier Force Rifles, Indian Army, attached South Waziristan Scouts.

Royal Air Force

- Squadron Leader Christopher Parton Gabriel, Auxiliary Air Force.
- Wing Commander Thomas Anthony Swinbourne, RAAF
- Flight Lieutenant Stanley Harcourt Mclntyre, RAAF
- Flying Officer Howard Gordon Bennett, RAAF

Civil Division

- Captain Francis Alonzo Abbott, JP For political and public services in Battersea.
- Robert Alstead, JP Chairman of the Wigan Local Employment Committee.
- Edna Haycroft Badock. For political and public services in Bristol.
- Marie Anna Bell. For political and public services in Hendon.
- William Burnett, Director of Stamping, Board of Inland Revenue.
- Cyril Bertram Collins, Senior Operations Officer, Department of Civil Aviation, Air Ministry.
- George Lionel Darbyshire, Chief Officer for Labour and Establishment, London, Midland and Scottish Railway Company. On the occasion of the centenary of the Railway.
- Eric Donaldson, Medical Officer, Ministry of Health.
- Robert Manfield Finch, MInstCE City Engineer and Surveyor, Nottingham. For services in connection with Air Raid Precautions.
- William Mowll Frazer, Medical Officer of Health, Liverpool. For services in connection with Air Raid Precautions.
- Charles Henry James Garland ISO MBE lately Organising Secretary, National Playing Fields Association.
- George Metcalfe Gillies, Actuary, Government Actuary's Department.
- Harper Bernard Harper, JP Chairman of the East Ham and Southend-on-Sea Joint Visiting Committee of the Runwell Mental Hospital.
- Professor Charles John Hawkes, Professor of Engineering, King's College, Newcastle. Member of the Departmental Committee on the Examination of Engineers in the Mercantile Marine, 1937.
- William Allan Forsyth Hepburn, MC Director of Education for Ayrshire.
- William Frederick Higgins, Secretary, National Physical Laboratory, Department of Scientific and Industrial Research.
- Richard John Humphreys, Chief Officer and Secretary of Trade Boards, Ministry of Labour.
- Major Henry Humphrey Jackson, MC TD JP For political and public services in the Clay Cross division of Derbyshire.
- William Clarence Johnson, Assistant Chief Constable of Birmingham.
- William Kean, JP Vice-Chairman of the Sheffield Local Employment Committee.
- Major William Campbell Kirkwood, MC General Manager, Scottish Development Council.
- Captain Henry William Lance. For political and public services in King's Lynn.
- John Laytham, JP For political and public services in Accrington.
- John Joseph Mclntyre, Secretary of the Rural District Councils Association.
- Commander Edwin Salisbury MacLeod, RNR (Retd.), Principal District Officer, London, Board of Trade.
- Eva Marion Maguire, Organiser, Sandes' Homes for Soldiers and Airmen. Robert Mitchelhill Middleton, Town Clerk of Lancaster.
- Robert Rose Milne. For political and public services in Midlothian.
- Arthur Macdonell Morley, H.M. Inspector of Schools, Board of Education.
- Major George Christopher Brooke Musgrave, JP DL For political and public services in Torquay.
- Henry Daniel Olivier, President, Public Assistance Authority, States of Guernsey.
- Harry Edward Piggott, Second Master, Royal Naval College, Dartmouth.
- Reuben James Pugsley. For political and public services in Cardiff.
- Arthur George Ramsey, MBE MInstCE MIEE Senior Engineer, H.M. Office of Works and Public Buildings.
- Charles Penny Cook Robertson, MBE Press and Publicity Officer, Air Ministry.
- Major Richard Atkinson Robinson, TD Air Raid Precautions Officer, Middlesex County Council.
- Thomas Rowatt, MM MIMechE Director of the Royal Scottish Museum.
- Charles Withers Sabin, Principal, Department of the Commissioner for the Special Areas (England and Wales).
- Councillor Harold Wadsworth Sellers, Chairman of the Leeds Air Raid Precautions Committee.
- Alderman John Edwin Shaw, JP Chairman of the Local Employment Committee and of the Juvenile Advisory Committee, Cradley Heath.
- Emma Stevinson, Principal of the Rachel McMillan Training College for Teachers in Nursery Schools, Deptford.
- Frances Henrietta, Lady Stewart, Chairman of the National Labour Women's Council. For political and public services.
- William Stewart, Chief Constable, Moray and Nairn.
- Reginald Thomas Stoddard, MBE District Officer, Bristol, Unemployment Assistance Board.
- Rebecca Strong, Formerly Matron of Glasgow Royal Infirmary.
- Alderman Arthur Sturgess, JP Chairman, Derby Advisory Committee, Unemployment Assistance Board.
- Lily Sophia Tawney. For political and public services in Oxford.
- William Frederick Taylor, Assistant Controller, London Telecommunications Region, General Post Office.
- David Thomas, Director of Education, Caernarvonshire.
- Ralph Wade, Director of Office Administration, British Broadcasting Corporation.
- Michael Ernest Waldman, JP For political and public services in Hackney.
- William Walker, Member of the North Eastern Housing Association, Secretary of the Durham Miners' Approved Association.
- Arthur Sidney Wilcockson, Captain, Imperial Airways.
- Bertram Arthur George Willis, Chief Accountant and Financial Adviser and Auditor, China Command, War Office.
- Alexander Wilson, Honorary Medical Officer, Scio House Hospital.
- Frederick Wilson, JP For political and public services in Co. Durham.
- Arthur Charles Wood, Assistant Accountant General, Board of Customs and Excise.
- Edward Alway Young. For political services in the Thornbury division of Gloucestershire.
- Evaline Sophie Robert Young. For services to the Beckenham Hospital.
- Walter Young, Governor of H.M. Prison, Wormwood Scrubs.
- William Yule, Regional Finance Officer, Scottish Region, General Post Office.

Overseas Residents

- Elena Boote, a British subject resident in Buenos Aires.
- Maberly Esler Dening, MBE, one of His Majesty's Consuls at present employed in the Foreign Office.
- Kaimakam George Naldrett-Jays Bey, Assistant Commandant, Alexandria City Police.
- Xavier Licari, a British subject resident in Tunis.
- Lieutenant-Colonel Harry Arthur Lilley, DSO District Commissioner, Equatoria Province, Sudan.
- Francis Alfred Nixon, a British subject resident in Canton.
- Major Reginald Sutton-Pratt, Royal Corps of Signals, formerly Acting Assistant Military Attache at His Majesty's Legation at Prague.
- Herbert Leonard Setchell, Commercial Secretary at His Majesty's Legation at Berne.
- John Alexis Waite, until recently His Majesty's Consul-General at Helsingfors.

Colonies, Protectorates, etc.

- Wilfred Eade Agar, FRS Professor of Zoology, University of Melbourne, State of Victoria.
- Herbert Raleigh Angell, MS Senior Pathologist of Plant Industry, Council for Scientific and Industrial Research, Commonwealth of Australia.
- Anna Bellette. For philanthropic services in the State of Tasmania.
- Walter Gerard Brind, DFC Director of Public Works, Bechuanaland Protectorate.
- Alderman Charles Naples Brown, Mayor of the City of Geelong, State of Victoria.
- Jabez Lewis Carnegie, President of the Royal Victorian Institute for the Blind, State of Victoria.
- Stuart Frederick Thomas Chandler, MICE Chief Road Engineer, Department of Roads, Southern Rhodesia.
- Lieutenant-Colonel Alexander Chisholm, DSO VD For public services in the Commonwealth of Australia.
- Henry Miles Cox, Reception Officer, Prime Minister's Department, Commonwealth of Australia.
- The Reverend Richard William Dobbinson, of Launceston Baptist Church, State of Tasmania. For social welfare services.
- John Hyslop Gardner, AMInstCE Director of Public Works, Swaziland.
- Jeannie Gunn. For literary services to the Commonwealth of Australia.
- Sidney John Harrison, General Secretary, Returned Soldiers' Association, Dominion of New Zealand.
- Eva Kolling. For philanthropic services in the State of New South Wales.
- John Claude McPhee, Deputy Commissioner in Victoria, Repatriation Commission, Commonwealth of Australia.
- Samuel Saltzman. For benefactions to humanitarian institutions in the Dominion of New Zealand.
- Captain Walter Eric Thomas, MC KC Attorney General, Southern Rhodesia.
- Mary Catherine Thomson. For social welfare services in the Commonwealth of Australia.
- Eric Ernest von Bibra. For services to ex-service men in the Commonwealth of Australia.
- Ira Wild, a Deputy Director of Audit, Exchequer and Audit Department, and lately Comptroller and Auditor-General, Newfoundland. For services to Newfoundland.
- Doctor Alice Woodward Horsley, Medical Practitioner, of Auckland, Dominion of New Zealand. For social welfare services.
- Teik Tin Pyu, Extra Assistant Commissioner (retired), Mandalay, Burma.
- Vernon Cecil Alexander. For public services in Jamaica.
- Kenneth William Blackburne, Colonial Administrative Service, Assistant District Commissioner, Palestine.
- James Clendinning, Colonial Survey Service, Surveyor-General, Gold Coast.
- Geoffrey Miles Clifford, Colonial Administrative Service, Senior District Officer, Nigeria.
- Edward Caruana Dingli, Director, School of Art, and Teacher of Painting, Malta.
- Khoo Sian Ewe. For public services in the Straits Settlements.
- Hugh Mackintosh Foot, Colonial Administrative Service, Assistant District Commissioner, Palestine.
- Bryan Edwin Frayling, Colonial Mines service, Chief Inspector of Mines, Tanganyika Territory.
- Percy Augustus Godwin, Colonial Survey Service, Director of Surveys and Lands, Sierra Leone.
- Donald Keith Shaftesbury Grant, Colonial Forest Service, Conservator of Forests, Tanganyika Territory.
- Captain Tom Hickinbotham, Civil Secretary, Aden.
- John Gerald Hemus Hopkins, Colonial Administrative Service, District Officer, Kenya.
- Georgina Rose Johnson, MBE Colonial Education Service, Superintendent of Female Education, Zanzibar.
- Alexander Keir, Colonial Education service, Chief Inspector of English Schools, Straits Settlements and Federated Malay States.
- Maurice Frederick Key. For public services in Hong Kong.
- Angus McCallum, MC Colonial Administrative Service, District Officer, Somaliland Protectorate.
- Hilda Matheson, Secretary to the African Research Survey.
- Thomas Arthur Owles, MInstCE Harbour Engineer, Colombo Port Commission, Ceylon.
- Gregor McGregor Peter. For public services in Saint Lucia.
- George Douglas Laurie Pile. For public services in Barbados.
- James Huey Hamill Pollock, Colonial Administrative Service, Assistant District Commissioner, Palestine.
- Major Robert Alexander Torrance. For public services in Trinidad.
- John Sutton Webster, Colonial Medical Service, Radiologist, Medical Department, Straits Settlements.
- John Eric Alexander Wolryche-Whitmore. For services to agriculture in Kenya.
- Robert Walker Yule. For public services in Northern Rhodesia.

India

- Ethel Adelaide Douglas, (Lond.), Missionary doctor in charge, Lady Kinnaird Women's Hospital, Lucknow, United Provinces.
- Major Reginald George Evelyn William Alban, Indian Political Service, Political Agent, Sibi, Baluchistan.
- Cecil Cuthbert Murrell Anderton, Indian Service of Engineers, Executive Engineer, North-West Frontier Province.
- Lieutenant-Colonel Kombar Ramaswami Krishnaswami Iyengar, , Indian Medical Service (retired), lately Director Pasteur Institute of Southern India, Coonoor.
- Major Dawarka Prasad Bhargava, FRCS Indian Medical Service, Professor of Surgery, Prince of Wales' Medical College, Patna, Bihar.
- Rai Bahadur Amarendra Nath Das, Bihar Provincial Civil Service, Secretary to the Board of Revenue, Bihar.
- Donald Hamilton Elwin, Indian Civil Service, lately Private Secretary to the Governor of Madras.
- Captain James Forsyth, Shipping Master, Calcutta.
- Sardar Bahadur Sardar Gurdial Singh, Home Member, Council of Regency, Nabha, Punjab States.
- Leslie Pascoe Hancox, Indian Civil service, Officiating Magistrate and Collector, United Provinces.
- Denys Kilburn, Indian Police, Senior Superintendent of Police, Delhi.
- Peter Lobo, Public Prosecutor (retired), Nagpur, Central Provinces and Berar.
- Ganesh Chandra Mitter, Chief Assayer, His Majesty's Mint, Bombay.
- Arthur Walter Pryde, Indian Police, Labour Officer for the City of Bombay and Bombay Suburban District, Bombay.
- Joshua Forbes Russell, Indian Service of Engineers, Executive Engineer, Communications and Works Department, Irrigation Branch, Bengal.
- Donald Langham Scott, Posts and Telegraphs Department, Presidency Postmaster, Calcutta.
- George Henry Welford, Indian Ordnance Services, Superintendent, Rifle Factory, Ishapore.
- John Stewart Wilcock, Indian Civil service, lately Secretary to the Governor of Orissa, Orissa.

Honorary Officers

- Amir Haidara bin Nasr bin Shaif Seif. For public services in the Aden Protectorate.
- Sheikh Said bin Ali El-Mugheiri, MBE For public services in Zanzibar.

==== Members of the Order of the British Empire (MBE) ====
Military Division

Royal Navy

- Lieutenant George Henry Warren, RN
- Shipwright Lieutenant Edgar Bertie Mitchell, RN
- Lieutenant-at-Arms Samuel James Bennellick, RN (Retired).
- Paymaster Lieutenant Charles Albert Gill, RN
- Commissioned Engineer Henry Hannaford, RN
- Lieutenant (E) John Dudley Owens, RAN
- Commissioned Gunner George Henry Copeland, RAN

Army

- Captain Mohamed Noor bin Shaik Ahmad, Penang and Province Wellesley Volunteer Corps, 3rd Battalion, Straits Settlements Volunteer Force.
- Major Ernest George Baker, The Princess Beatrice's (Isle of Wight Rifles) Heavy Brigade, Royal Artillery, Territorial Army. (Captain, retired pay, Regular Army Reserve of Officers, The Hampshire Regiment.)
- Major George Sheldon Bayliss, 73rd Anti-Aircraft Brigade, Royal Artillery, Territorial Army.
- Captain Noel Gordon Blake, ist Battalion The Herefordshire Regiment, Territorial Army. (Lieutenant, Regular Army Reserve of Officers, The Buffs (Royal East Kent Regiment).)
- Major (Commissary) John Stacey Bolton, retired, late India Miscellaneous List, late Personal Assistant to the Master-General of the Ordnance, Headquarters of the Army in India.
- Captain (Quarter-Master) Leonard Brindle, Royal Army Medical Corps, Territorial Army.
- Lieutenant (Assistant Commissary) Douglas Buchanan, Indian Army Corps of Clerks.
- Major Edward Stephen Cadic, Thames and Medway Heavy Brigade, Royal Artillery, Territorial Army.
- Major Basil Charles Durkin, late Royal Army Ordnance Corps, Territorial Army, late Deputy Assistant Director of Ordnance services, 43rd (Wessex) Division, Territorial Army.
- Warrant Officer Class II, Battery Sergeant-Major Walter Victor Dyson, 90th (City of London) Field Brigade, Royal Artillery, Territorial Army.
- Second Lieutenant Alexander Thomson Edgar, 1st (Perak) Battalion, Federated Malay States Volunteer Force.
- Jemadar Kansipersad Gurung, 2nd Battalion, 5th Royal Gurkha Rifles, (Frontier Force), Indian Army.
- Lieutenant (local Captain) John Winthrop Hackett, 8th King's Royal Irish Hussars, Squadron Officer, Trans-Jordan Frontier Force.
- Major Kenneth Hargreaves, 66th (Leeds Rifles, The West Yorkshire Regiment) Anti-Aircraft Brigade, Royal Artillery, Territorial Army.
- Major Alfred Ernest Heald, Royal Army Ordnance Corps, Territorial Army, Deputy Assistant Director of Ordnance Services, 42nd (East Lancashire) Division, Territorial Army.
- Lieutenant Adrian Everard Hedley, 4th Battalion, The Royal Northumberland Fusiliers, Territorial Army.
- Major Arthur Hemsley, TD 1st Anti-Aircraft Divisional Signals, Royal Corps of Signals, Territorial Army.
- Quarter-Master and Honorary Captain John Edward Hendry, Australian Instructional Corps, Instructor, School of Artillery, Sydney, Australian Military Forces.
- Major Frank Wilkinson Hudson, 42nd (East Lancashire) Divisional Engineers, Royal Engineers, Territorial Army.
- Major Edward William Claude Hurford, 6th (Glamorgan) Battalion, The Welch Regiment, Territorial Army.
- Quarter-Master and Honorary Lieutenant John Hutchison, Australian Instructional Corps, Staff Officer, Rifle Clubs, 2nd Military District, Australian Military Forces.
- Major (Quarter-Master) William Jones, TD Royal Army Medical Corps, Territorial Army.
- Warrant Officer Class II (Regimental Quarter-Master-Sergeant) Sydney George Kingham, MM London Irish Rifles, The Royal Ulster Rifles, Territorial Army.
- Warrant Officer Class II (Staff Sergeant-Major) George Ferguson MacCulloch, New Zealand Military Forces, Regimental Sergeant-Major, Army School of Instruction, Trentham, New Zealand.
- Warrant Officer Class II (Regimental Quarter-Master-Sergeant) Alfred Cooke Metcalfe, The Liverpool Scottish, The Queen's Own Cameron Highlanders, Territorial Army.
- Major Egerton Royal Millard, Royal Army Ordnance Corps, Territorial Army, Deputy Assistant Director of Ordnance Services, 48th (South Midland) Division, Territorial Army.
- Major Alfred Benjamin Milner, 92nd (5th London) Field Brigade, Royal Artillery, Territorial Army.
- Major Thomas Henry Miller Murray, 5th (Dumfries and Galloway) Battalion, The King's Own Scottish Borderers, Territorial Army.
- Regimental Sergeant-Major Cyrus Watkin Milly Oorloff, Ceylon Light Infantry.
- Captain Cecil William Gabriel Pike, 53rd (City of London) Anti-Aircraft Brigade, Royal Artillery, Territorial Army.
- Warrant Officer Class II (Battery Sergeant-Major) Hugh Michael Price, 61st Carnarvon and Denbigh (Yeomanry) Medium Brigade, Royal Artillery, Territorial Army,
- Warrant Officer Class II (Battery Sergeant-Major Norman Leslie Pullen, Devonshire Heavy Brigade, Royal Artillery, Territorial Army.
- Warrant Officer Class II (Company Sergeant-Major) Frederick Henry Rudd, 10th (3rd City of London) Battalion, The Royal Fusiliers (City of London Regiment), Territorial Army.
- Warrant Officer Class II (Battery Sergeant-Major) Cyril George Saunders, 63rd (6th London) Field Brigade, Royal Artillery, Territorial Army.
- Warrant Officer Class II (Battery Sergeant-Major) Thomas William Stevens, 70th (3rd West Lancashire) Anti-Aircraft Brigade, Royal Artillery, Territorial Army.
- Major (Quarter-Master) Thomas John Stroud, 5th Battalion, The Loyal Regiment (North Lancashire), Territorial Army, (Lieutenant, retired pay, late The North Staffordshire Regiment (The Prince of Wales's)).
- Captain (Quarter-Master) Frederick George Verlander, 4th/5th Battalion, The Buffs (Royal East Kent Regiment), Territorial Army.
- Major Victor Dunn Warren, 52nd (Lowland) Divisional Signals, Royal Corps of Signals, Territorial Army.
- Lieutenant (Quarter-Master) Charles Frederick William Wates, Territorial Army Reserve of Officers, late 35th (First Surrey Rifles) Anti-Aircraft Battalion, Royal Engineers, Territorial Army.
- Major (Quarter-Master) Charles Gloucester Wicks, 6th Battalion, The Durham Light Infantry, Territorial Army. (Lieutenant, retired pay, late The Durham Light Infantry.)
- Lieutenant (Quarter-Master) William Henry Williams, retired, late 4th/5th (The Ross, Sutherland, and Caithness) Battalion, The Seaforth Highlanders (Ross-shire Buffs, The Duke of Albany's), Territorial Army.
- Warrant Officer Class II (Battery Sergeant-Major) William Edward Winter, 63rd (Northumbrian) Anti-Aircraft Brigade, Royal Artillery, Territorial Army.
- Quarter-Master and Honorary Major Charles Robert Victor Wright, MC Australian Instructional Corps, Adjutant and Quarter-Master 43rd/48th Battalion, Australian Infantry, 4th Military District, Australian Military Forces.

Royal Air Force

Civil Division

- John Henry Sigsworth Allison, JP Vice-Chairman of the Hartlepools Employment Committee.
- George Fletcher Bagshaw, F.A.I. For political and public services in Uttoxeter, Staffordshire.
- George James Biggs, FIAA.|Civil Engineer, Air Ministry.
- Victor Leopold Bilbey, Higher Grade Clerk, Ministry of Health.
- Elsie Grace Blackwell, Chief Superintendent of Typists, Unemployment Assistance Board.
- Louisa Blair. For public services in Birkenhead.
- Ernest Bosworth, Headmaster, Lancaster Road Senior Boys' School, Kensington.
- Mary Gertrude Breton. For political and public services in Portsmouth.
- George Robert Brown, Senior Staff Officer, General Post Office.
- Adam Buchanan, Public Assistance Officer for the Burgh of Paisley.
- Bertha Marie Louise Katherine Burge. For political and public services in Plymouth.
- Walter Roland Butler, JP For political and public services in South Buckinghamshire.
- Elinor Cadell, JP Convener, Children's Sub-Committee of the Lothians War Pensions Committee.
- The Reverend Eustace Harold Carew, Chairman of the Old Contemptibles' Association.
- Ruby May Carter. For political and public services in Watford.
- Alderman George Ambrose Chadwick. For political and public services in Flintshire.
- Dorothy Gladys Chambers, Technical Assistant, Grade 1, Air Ministry.
- John Leonard Clarkson. For political and public services in Nottingham.
- Olive Warren Crosse, Honorary Secretary, British Refugees from Spain Fund.
- John Davidson Formerly Headmaster of Plockton Higher Grade School, Ross and Cromarty.
- Benjamin Davies, Collector of Taxes, Cardiff, Board of Inland Revenue.
- George Davis, Chief Superintendent and Deputy Chief Constable, Worcestershire Constabulary.
- Ruth Annie Dawson, Headmistress, Marton Grove Senior Girls' School, Middlesbrough.
- Cecil Edith Mary Dixon, Pianist on the Music Staff of the British Broadcasting Corporation.
- Arthur Oldfield Dowsett, Staff Officer, Board of Inland Revenue.
- William Alfred Dye, Staff Officer, Admiralty.
- George Felton Edkins, Senior Staff Officer, Board of Trade.
- William Lionel Eves, FRIBA Architect to the Uxbridge Urban District Council.
- George Edward Fawcett, Executive Officer, Leyton Juvenile Employment Committee.
- Alderman Amos Ford, JP For services in East Barnet.
- Oliver George Robert Fox, Staff Officer, Public Record Office.
- The Reverend Canon Charles Edward Middleton Fry, Chairman of the Slough Local Employment Committee.
- George William Giles, Secretary of the National Allotments Society.
- George Chettle Green, Staff Officer, Dominions Office.
- Harold Gregson, Investment Manager, Manchester Branch, Public Trustee Office.
- Francis William Hamilton, Chief Clerk in the office of the Assistant Commissioner for England and Wales, Forestry Commission.
- Thomas Henry Hammond, Staff Officer, Board of Trade.
- Janet Harper, Higher Executive Officer, Department of Health for Scotland.
- William Harry Harris, Clerk to the Walton and Weybridge Urban District Council. For services in connection with Air Raid Precautions.
- Isabel Harrison, Assistant Accountant, Ministry of Labour.
- James Alfred Hartopp. For political and public services in Leicester.
- William John Haslett, Headmaster, Model Public Elementary School, Cliftonville, Belfast.
- Henry Arthur Hayward, Staff Clerk, War Office.
- Lucy Hickman, JP For political and public services in Wolverhampton.
- Frederick William Hicks, Superintendent and Chief Clerk, Bristol City Police Force.
- Arthur Rollings, Gardener-Instructor, Fylde Farm Approved School.
- Captain Risden Waldemar Hollingworth. For political and public services in the Wallsend division of Northumberland.
- Henry Edwin Honnor. For political and public services in Enfield, Middlesex.
- Ada Kathleen Fanny Jessop, Chief Superintendent of Typists, Ministry of Health.
- Bertram Barrington Jones, Director of the Cleansing Department of the Manchester City Corporation. For services in connection with Air Raid Precautions.
- Thomas Gordon Jones, Senior Staff Officer, Ministry of Transport.
- Edwin William Knight, Assistant Engineer, South Midland District, General Post Office.
- Percy Thomas Lord, Chairman, Norwich and District War Pensions Committee.
- William Mackie McKechnie, Superintendent and Deputy Chief Constable, Greenock Police Force.
- Sydney James McVicar, Assistant Solicitor to the West Riding of Yorkshire County Council. For services in connection with Air Raid Precautions.
- Marion Mann, JP For political and public services in Newport, Monmouthshire.
- Winifred Martin, Matron, West Park
- Hospital, Macclesfield. Francis Maxwell. For political and public services in Blackburn.
- John Metcalfe, Chief Air Raid Warden for Newcastle.
- Sydney Alfred Mitchell, Air Raid Pre.cautions Officer for Boots Pure Drug Company.
- Harold Needham. For political and public services in Derby.
- James Oliphant, Manager of the Fuze Department, Royal Arsenal, Woolwich.
- Mary O'Sullivan, Postmistress, Smith-down Lane Sub-Office, Liverpool.
- Horatio Hubert Palmer, Chief Clerk, Board of Customs and Excise.
- Leonard Rivers Norman Percey. For political services in East Willesden.
- Robert Petrie, Superintendent and Deputy Chief Constable, East Lothian County Police.
- Ernest Phillips. For political and public services in Doncaster.
- Charles William Pink, Staff Officer, Offices of the Cabinet, Committee of Imperial Defence, Economic Advisory Council, and Minister for Co-ordination of Defence.
- Sophia Rosamond Praeger, Sculptor and book illustrator.
- Annie Rankin, Headmistress, Selly Park Senior Girls' Council School, Birmingham.
- Henry Crisp Rayner, Senior Staff Clerk, Ministry of Labour.
- Annie Maud Mary Fowell Richards. For political services in Greenwich.
- John Richards, Staff Officer, H.M. Office of Works and Public Buildings.
- Agnes Brooknan Ross Ronald. For social services in Falkirk.
- John Joseph Cecil Rowden, Assistant Controller, London Postal Region, General Post Office.
- James Percy Russel, Communications Department, Foreign Office.
- John Barrowcliff Scattergood, District Goods Manager at Birmingham, London Midland and Scottish Railway Company. On the occasion of the centenary of the Railway.
- Doris George Schwind, JP For political and public services in Grantham.
- Henry Scott. For political and public services in the Isle of Ely division.
- Alexander Francis Smith, Marketing Officer, Department of Agriculture for Scotland.
- Hilda Amy Smith, Honorary Directress of the Disabled Sailors and Soldiers Workshops, Bournemouth.
- George Wogan Somers, Staff Officer, Post Office Stores Department, General Post Office.
- Matilda Anne Southgate, JP For political and public services in North Islington.
- Henry Steel, Chief Superintendent and Chief Clerk, West Riding of Yorkshire Constabulary.
- Richard Charles Sugars, DCM Assistant to the Officers of Accounts, Treasury.
- Donald Nevill Swanson, Naval Store Officer, Admiralty.
- George William Thomas, Senior Staff Officer, Land Fertility Committee, Ministry of Agriculture and Fisheries.
- Margaret Gordon Thomson. For political and public services in Glasgow.
- John Tibbs, Managing Clerk of Messrs. Harmood Banner and Son, Liverpool. For services to the provision trade.
- Edgar James Turner. For political and public services in Leeds.
- Edward John Reginald Walsh, lately Assistant Inspector, Board of Education.
- Alderman William Charles Watkins, JP Chairman of the Ministry of Labour Juvenile Advisory Committee, Pontypool.
- Harry Ernest Whiting, FSS Honorary Secretary of the Incorporated Association of Rating and Valuation Officers.
- Sarah Whittle, Matron of the Stokesley Institution.
- Alice Jane Williams, Chairman of the Women's Sub-Committee of the Swansea Local Employment Committee.
- David Wilson, Waterguard Surveyor, Board of Customs and Excise.
- Amelia Wilson Winpenny. For political and public services in Stockton-on-Tees.
- George Wallace Yandell, Superintendent, Metropolitan Police.
- Baillie John Young. For political and public services in Glasgow.

Overseas Residents

- Francis Louis Bougeya, Headmaster of the Maltese School, Suez.
- Harry Bullock, British Vice-Consul at Bremen.
- Antonio Ellul, formerly British Vice-Consul at Benghazi.
- George William Minter Harpley, Archivist at His Majesty's Embassy at St. Jean de Luz.
- Hugh Ravenhill Hulbert, a British subject resident at El Obeid, Sudan.
- Jonathan Emmanuel Jones, a British subject resident in Uruguay.
- William Leverkus, British Pro-Consul at Cartagena.
- Annabella Wilkinson Macintosh, Matron of the British Hospital at Buenos Aires.
- Kenneth Courage Macray, British Vice-Consul at Maceio, Brazil.
- Lucy Sharp, Clerk at His Majesty's Consulate at Valencia.
- Henry Victor Spraggs, Inspector of Ordnance and Explosives, Sudan Government.
- Maurice Encyl Taylor, Archivist at His Majesty's Legation at Prague.

India and Burma

- Caroline Mary Edwards, Lady Superintendent of Women's and Children's work in the Hubli Industrial Settlement, Hubli, Dharwar District, Bombay.
- Winifred Park, Madras. Educational service, Lecturer in Domestic Science for European Schools, Madras.
- Khan Sahib Sheikh Alam Ali, Provincial Civil Service, Supervisor, Jail Manufactures, Punjab Jail Department, Punjab.
- Edwin Catley, Assistant Executive Engineer, North-Western Railway.
- Dines Chandra Chakravarti, FRCSE, Bengal Medical Service, Professor of Clinical and Operative Surgery, Medical College, Calcutta, Bengal.
- George Maurice Cheesman, Higher Clerical Officer, Office of the High Commissioner for India.
- Captain Bertram Maurice Chanas Inglefield Dall, Madras Jail Service, Acting Superintendent, Central Jail, Bellary, Madras.
- Rai Sahib Lala Dhanpat Rai, Assistant Secretary to the Government of India in the Department of Education, Health and Lands.
- William Richard Palmer Downing, District Engineer, District Board, Purnea, Bihar.
- Robin Olive Drummond, Indian Forest Service, Deputy Conservator of Forests, United Provinces.
- Saraju Kanta Dutt, Engineer, Darjeeling Municipality, Bengal.
- Stephen Timothy Fernandes, City Magistrate, Poona, Bombay.
- Khan Bahadur Ghulam Nabi Kazi son of Dinmahomed Kazi, Director of Public Instruction, Sind.
- Robert Thomas Mansfield Hayter, Indian Medical Department, 1st Class, Assistant Director, School of Tropical Medicine and Resident Medical Officer, Carmichael Hospital, Calcutta, Bengal.
- Rowland Alfred Kirkman Hill, Assistant Secretary to the Government of India in the External Affairs Department.
- Eric John Hart Jacobson, Superintendent, Transportation, East Indian Railway.
- Khan Bahadur Mirza Jafar Ah' Khan, Provincial Civil Service (Executive Branch), United Provinces.
- Jagdishwar Dayal, Superior Service of the Military Accounts Department, Assistant Military Accountant-General.
- Caleb St. John Lawrence, Military Accounts Department, Deputy Assistant Controller of Military Accounts.
- Rai Bahadur Lala Shankar Das Luthra, Provincial Civil Service, Extra Assistant Commissioner, Lahore, Punjab.
- John MacLachlan Maclntyre, Indian Service of Engineers (Punjab), Executive Engineer, Quetta City, Baluchistan.
- Peter Donald Macpherson, lately Financial Adviser to the Co-operative Department, Punjab.
- William McLean, Registrar, University of Madras, Madras.
- Mellville Owen Marchant, Bombay Customs Department, Chief Accounts Officer of Customs and Officiating Assistant Collector of Customs, Bombay.
- Desraj Mehta, Indian Service of Engineers, Executive Engineer, Public Works Department and Under-Secretary to the Government of Bihar, Public Works Department, Bihar.
- William Arthur Myatt, lately Editor, Daily Gazette Karachi, Sind.
- Rai Bahadur Kharag Narayan, Banker, Merchant and Zamindar, Begusarai, Monghyr District, Bihar.
- Henry Joseph Newham, Officer Supervisor, Adjutant-General's Branch, Army Headquarters, India.
- Dattatraya Laxman Nirokhekar, Law Lecturer at the Police Training School, Nasik, Bombay.
- Rai Sahib Puran Chand, Royal Indian Army Service Corps, Civilian Gazetted Officer, Supply Personnel Depot, Ambala.
- John Sidney Augustus Selwyn, Indian Police, Officer-in-Charge, Police Training Centre, Hangu, North-West Frontier Province.
- Oscar Henry Clive Shelswell, Indian Forest Service (retired), lately Personal Assistant to the Chief Conservator of Forests, Madras.
- Alexander Key Thorns, General District Superintendent of Begg Dunlop Jute Mills, Bengal.
- Chauhdri Tikka Ram, Member, Legislative Assembly (Punjab), and Pleader, Sonepat, Rohtak District, Punjab.
- Captain Harold Duncan Ross Zscherpel, Indian Medical Service, Superintendent, Central Jail, Peshawar, North-West Frontier Province.
- Avice Mary Cam, Medical Missionary, Maubin District, Burma.
- U Tun Pe, Lecturer, Judson College, Rangoon, Burma.

Colonies, Protectorates, etc.

- Samuel John Bryce Beard. For municipal and social welfare services in the Commonwealth of Australia.
- Alan Cuthbert Bettley-Cooke. For services to ex-service men in the Commonwealth of Australia.
- Marion Christiana Jane Biggs. For social welfare services in the Commonwealth of Australia.
- Olive Norma Cameron. For social welfare services in the Commonwealth of Australia.
- Beatrice Alice Campbell, Matron, Public Hospital, New Plymouth, Dominion of New Zealand.
- Isabel Mona Corkill, Sister-in-charge of nurses, Maude District Nursing Association, Christchurch, Dominion of New Zealand.
- Harold Jack Finnis. For public services in the Commonwealth of Australia.
- Nora Philomena Fitzgibbon, Nursing Adviser to the Plunket Society, Dunedin, Dominion of New Zealand.
- John Garfield Fussell, Secretary, A.I.F. Canteen Funds and Sir Samuel McCaughey A.I.F. Bequest Trusts, Commonwealth of Australia.
- Mary Fanny Gaby, Lady Corps Superintendent, St. John's Ambulance Brigade, Wellington, Dominion of New Zealand.
- Harvey Ennis Gale. For public services in the State of New South Wales.
- Llewellyn Henry Griffiths, Deputy-Director in South Australia, Postmaster. General's Department, Commonwealth of Australia.
- Ivy Halbert, Organising Secretary, Central Methodist Mission, State of New South Wales.
- Marguerite Rose Hewitt, Member of the Children's Council and the Children's Welfare and Public Relief Board, State of South Australia.
- William John Hunt. For services to ex-service men in the Commonwealth of Australia.
- Sybil Irving. For social welfare services in the State of Victoria.
- Alfred Edward Joyner. For public services in the Commonwealth of Australia.
- Alexander Stewart Maclntyre, Principal, Lerotholi Technical School, Basutoland.
- Mary Josephine Martin, Matron, Sunnyside Hospital, Christchurch, Dominion of New Zealand.
- Mabel Mary McCutcheon. For social welfare services in the State of South Australia.
- Cecilia McKenny, President, Registered Nurses' Association, Dominion of New Zealand.
- Mary McMillan. For charitable services in the Commonwealth of Australia.
- Janet Anne Moore, Nurse Instructor and Supervisor, Department of Health, Dominion of New Zealand.
- Walter George Oakes, Metropolitan Superintendent of Police in charge of the combined Metropolitan Southern Districts, State of Tasmania.
- John Ralstein. For social welfare services in Southern Rhodesia.
- Jeanie Ranken. For charitable services in the State of New South Wales.
- Arthur William Shano, lately Superintendent, Newfoundland Branch Post Office, North Sydney, Nova Scotia.
- Dorothea Jane Toan, Matron, R.T. Hall Sanatorium (T.B.), Hazelbrook, State of New South Wales.
- Mary Wignall. For social welfare services in the State of Tasmania.
- Ghulam Ali Kader Bhoy. For public services in Zanzibar.
- Hannah Rebecca Burton. For services to education in Nigeria.
- Janet Dorothy Kate Butler. For social services in the Federated Malay States.
- Denise De Chazal. For social and charitable services in Mauritius.
- Felix Delmas, Examiner of Accounts, Audit Department, Trinidad.
- Edwin Roland De Silva, Assistant Registrar-General, Ceylon.
- Mukund Ganesh Dharap. For public services in the Nyasaland Protectorate.
- Sidney Alexander Eldon, Clerk, Grade I, Receiver-General and Treasurer's Department, Bahamas.
- Captain Hugh Murray Grant, MC Colonial Administrative Service, District Officer, Kenya.
- Arthur George Reginald Higgins, Assistant Superintendent, Class I, Kenya and Uganda Railways and Harbours Administration.
- Frederick Hodgson, Colonial Education Service, Principal, Central Trades School, Lusaka, Northern Rhodesia.
- Cunliffe Malcolm Gustave Hoyte, Sanitary Inspector and Training Officer, Health Branch of the Medical Service, Gold Coast.
- Cuthbert Arthur Hudson, Secretary and Interpreter, British Guiana-Brazil Boundary Commission.
- Lettice Kesteven, lately Controller of Female Staff, Crown Agents for the Colonies.
- Aram Mihran Hampartsoum Kevorkian, Chief Clerk, Treasury, Cyprus
- Henry Evans Maude, Colonial Administrative Service, Native Lands Commissioner, Gilbert Islands, Western Pacific.
- Inez Munro. For social services in Grenada.
- Wilfred Dunston Nicholas, Assistant Civil Engineer, Singapore Harbour Board, Straits Settlements.
- Arthur Wilfred Phillips, Senior Overseer, Public Works Department, Uganda Protectorate.
- Douglas Bland St. Aubyn, Third Class Clerk, Treasury, British Guiana.
- James Scott. For public services in Palestine.
- John Dudley Lucie-Smith, Principal Clerk, Secretariat, Jamaica.
- Catherine Frances Taylor, For medical services in Tanganyika Territory.
- Alexander Keith Taylor, Chief Inspector, Sanitary Department, Hong Kong.
- Jabez Griffith Corbin Ward, Manager and Secretary of the General Hospital, Barbados.

Honorary Members

- David Boulos Carmi, Administrative Officer, Palestine.
- Serwano Wofunira Kulubya, Omuwanika of Buganda, Uganda Protectorate.
- Isaac Melamede, Office Superintendent, Public Works Department, Palestine.

=== Kaisar-i-Hind Medals ===
First Class + Bar

- Ida Sophia Scudder, Principal, The Missionary Medical College for Women, and Superintendent, The Missionary Medical College Hospital, Vellore, North Arcot District, Madras.

First Class

- Deaconess Miriam Coulthurst, Saint Faith's Society, Madras.
- Irene Harper (wife of the Reverend A. E. Harper, American Mission Training School for Village Teachers, Moga, Ferozepur District), Punjab.
- Hilda Margaret, Lady Sachse (wife of Sir F. A. Sachse, CSI CIE Bengal.
- Nilakanta Sivakamu, (Rotunda, Dublin), Principal Zenana Medical Officer, Bikaner State, Rajputana.
- Norah Ethel Whitfield, Principal, Cathedral and John Connon Girls' High School, Fort, Bombay.
- The Reverend Canon Malcolm George Goldsmith, Church Missionary Society, Madras.
- Alfred Donald Miller, Secretary, Mission to Lepers, India, Bihar.
- The Very Reverend Monsignor Piego Remedies, JP Dean of Bombay and Principal of the St. Teresa's High School, Girgaum, Bombay.
- Theodore Howard Somervell, FRCS in charge of the London Mission Hospital, Neyyoor, Travancore State, Madras States.
- Major-General George Mackintosh Lindsay, CB CMG DSO Commander, Presidency and Assam District.

=== British Empire Medals (BEM) ===
Military Division

For Meritorious Service

- Sergeant Harry Laming, 7th Battalion, The Duke of Wellington's Regiment (West Riding), Territorial Army.
- Company Quarter-Master-Sergeant William Theodore Lodge, 55th (West Lancashire) Divisional Engineers, Royal Engineers, Territorial Army.
- Battery Quarter-Master-Sergeant Harold Clark, MM Thames and Medway Heavy Brigade, Royal Artillery, Territorial Army.
- Bugle-Major John Harry McCormack, Queen Victoria's Rifles, The King's Royal Rifle Corps, Territorial Army.
- Battery Quarter-Master-Sergeant Thomas Richard Gray Clarke, 66th (South Midland) Field Brigade, Royal Artillery, Territorial Army.
- Bombardier William Jess, Light Battery, Federated Malay States Volunteer Force.
- Corporal Alexander Bain, Royal Australian Air Force
- Archie Victor Styles, Chief Petty Officer Writer, New Zealand Naval Forces, Wellington.

Civil Division

For Gallantry

For Meritorious Service

- Frederick William Baker, Engineering Skilled Workman, Class I, Temple Bar Exchange, General Post Office.
- Ernest Edward Balls, Superintendent of the Subordinate Staff, Public Record Office.
- George Frederick Coward, Foreman, the Mandall Slate Company, Coniston, Lancashire. For rescue work on Coniston OldMan.
- Harry James Dean, Dining Car Attendant, London, Midland and Scottish Railway Company. On the occasion of the centenary of the Railway.
- Charles Fraser, Lieutenant, Glasgow City Police Force. For services in connection with Air Raid Precautions.
- Robert Herkes, Rural Postman, Heriot Sub-Office, Midlothian.
- Alfred William Heselton, MM|Class I Chief Officer, Feltham Borstal Institution, Middlesex.
- Edward Ernest Horney, Inspector, Euston ' Station, London, Midland and Scottish Railway Company. On the occasion of the centenary of the Railway.
- John Henry Fraser Kellet, Engineering Skilled Workman, Class I, Chelmsford, General Post Office.
- Frederick William King, Sorter, Inland Sec.tion, London Postal Region, General Post Office.
- Florence Lambert, Telephone Super.visor, Birmingham, General Post Office.
- Frederick Porter McCulloch, Lieutenant, Edinburgh City Police Force. For services in connection with Air Raid Precautions.
- John McLennan, Head Foreman, Engine Works Machine Shops, Messrs. John Brown and Company, Shipbuilders, Clydebank.
- Dorothy Ada Mann, Telephonist, General Post Office, employed at the Admiralty.
- Charles Sydney Spencer Mumford, Architectural and Civil Engineering Assistant, Grade II, Eastern Command.
- Henry Charles Priest, Civil Engineering Assistant, Ministry of Transport.
- John Rae, Head Foreman, Engine Works, Dock Engineers' Department, Messrs. John Brown and Company, Shipbuilders, Clydebank.
- Thomas Wilkison Miller Rankin, Principal Foreman Ironworker, Messrs. John Brown and Company, Shipbuilders, Clydebank.
- Ernest Rowland, Engineering Skilled Work.man, Class II, North Midland District, General Post Office.
- William Slater, Principal Foreman Joiner, Messrs. John Brown and Company, Shipbuilders, Clydebank.
- George Sherwood Hills Tait, Engineering - Skilled Workman, Class I, Edinburgh, General Post Office.
- Henry Broughton Taylor, Engineering Skilled Workman, Class II, Birmingham, General Post Office.
- Frederic Bob Wilcher, Inspector, Engineer-in-Chief's Office, General Post Office.
- Abdulla Hassan Shane, Overseer, Khartoum Veterinary Hospital, Sudan.
- Andrew Farmer Auchterlonie, Foreman Ship.wright, H.M. Australian Naval Establishments, Garden Island, Sydney, New South Wales.
- Syed Sadiq Hussain, Forest Ranger, Razmak Range, Waziristan, North-West Frontier Province, India.
- Shaikh Solomon, Chargeman, Rifle Factory, Ishapore, Bengal.
- Ramrao Dwarkanath Vijaykar, Cashier, Motor Vehicles Department, Office of the Commissioner of Police, Bombay.
- Dominic Wates, Superintendent, Political Branch, Hyderabad Residency, Hyderabad.
- Ishak Bin Ahmad, Senior Fishery Officer, Department of Fisheries, Straits Settlements and Federated Malay States.
- Habib Jahshan, Foreman, Engineering Branch, Department of Posts and Telegraphs, Palestine.
- Abdul Ghani Issa Rabieh, Foreman, Engineering Branch, Department of Posts and Telegraphs, Palestine.
- Mohamed Abdul Rahman, Skilled Workman, Class II, Department of Posts and Telegraphs, Palestine.

=== Imperial Service Medals ===
Indian Civil Services

- Oomer Khan Adam Khan, First Grade Warder, District Jail, Madura, Madras.
- Allah Bakhsh, Chaprasi, Headworks Sub-Division, Lower Chenab West Circle, Punjab.
- Chakar Khan, Havildar, Public Works Department, Sind.
- Bondili Heeraman Singh, Duffadar, District Court, Guntur, Madras.
- Narayanaswami Ramaswami, First Grade Warder, Central Jail, Bellary, Madras.
- Sardar Sunder Singh, Head Munshi, Irrigation Revenue, Ministerial Staff, Public Works Department, North-West Frontier Province.

Colonial Service

- David Alexander, Chief Boatman, Customs Department, Trinidad.
- Muhammad Ali Bin Muhammad Ariff, Malay Teacher, Special Class, Malacca, Straits Settlements.
- May Isabel Haydon, Chief Operator, Telephone Service, St. Christopher-Nevis, Leeward Islands.
- Oliver Seymour Hill, Chief Telephone Linesman, St. Christopher-Nevis, Leeward Islands.
- Lilian Macpherson, Supervisor, Telecommunications Branch, Post Office, British Guiana.
- Walter William Marsh, Gaoler, Prison Service, Straits Settlements.
- Erawwala Acharigo Martin Singho, Minor Supervisor, Mechanical Engineers' Department, Ceylon Government Railways.
- Sung Teng-Man, Accountant, Medical Department, Hong Kong

=== Air Force Crosses ===
- Wing Commander Harry King Goode, DSO DFC
- Squadron Leader Robert Owen Jones.
- Squadron Leader George Reginald Ashton.
- Squadron Leader John Woodburn Gillan.
- Squadron Leader John Francis Xavier McKenna.
- Squadron Leader Sydney Richard Ubee.
- Squadron Leader Glynn Silyn-Roberts.
- Flight Lieutenant William Daniel Disbrey.
- Flying Officer (acting Flight Lieutenant) Noel Mudie Hall.
- Flying Officer John Alexander Kent.
- Pilot Officer, now Flying Officer, George Forbes Rodney.
- Flight Lieutenant Clement Allin Pike.

Australia

- Flying Officer Harry Allen Durant.

=== Air Force Medals ===
Royal Air Force

- Flight Sergeant William Lawry.
- Flight Sergeant John Nelson Ogle.
- Flight Sergeant Jack Martindale Whitwell.
- Flight Sergeant Reginald George Williams.
- Sergeant George Henry Leonard Baker.
- Sergeant, now Flight Sergeant, Douglas Arthur Haydon.
- Sergeant Jack Shearsmith.
- Sergeant Edward Thomas Summers.
- Sergeant George Alfred Tansley.
- Corporal Victor Joe Carter.
- Corporal David Henry Davis.

=== Royal Red Crosses (RRC) ===
Second Class

- Senior Sister Elsie Madeleine Clements
- Senior Sister Lilla Eliza Taylor, in recognition of the special devotion and competency displayed by them in the nursing and care of the sick in Royal Air Force hospitals at home and abroad.

=== King's Police Medals (KPM) ===
For Gallantry

England and Wales

- Ronald Tom Bailey, Sergeant, Metropolitan Police Force.
- George Edward Hemley, Sergeant, Metropolitan Police Force.
- Cecil Rackham, Sergeant, Metropolitan Police Force.
- Matthew Bursnall, Constable, Metropolitan Police Force.
- Alexander Carmichael, Constable, Metropolitan Police Force.
- Frederick Henry Champs, Constable, Metropolitan Police Force.
- Albert Edward Henry Cosham, Constable, Metropolitan Police Force.
- Frederick William Ground, Constable, Metropolitan Police Force.
- Arthur James McKitterick, Constable, Metropolitan Police Force.
- William Dale Paxton, Constable, Metropolitan Police Force.
- Elliott Horn Pillar, Constable, Metropolitan Police Force.
- Willam Henry Keen, Constable, City of London Police Force.
- Edwin Percival Brazell, Constable, Berkshire Constabulary.
- Horace Osborn, Sergeant, Cornwall Constabulary.
- George Edgar Appleton, Constable, Cornwall Constabulary.
- Leslie John Sidney Jones, Constable, Cornwall Constabulary.
- Noel Heatley Wilkinson, Constable, Cornwall Constabulary.
- Harry Wild, Inspector, Lancashire Constabulary.
- Keith Webster, Chief Constable, Gravesend Borough Police Force.
- Hedley Jeffcott, Sergeant, Northampton Borough Police Force.
- Edwin William Alfred Ashman, Constable, Salford City Police Force.

Fire Brigade England and Wales

- George Richardson, Chief Officer, Jarrow Borough Fire Brigade.

Northern Ireland

- Daniel Connell, Sergeant, Royal Ulster Constabulary.

India

- Subba Reddi Raghava Reddi, Constable, Madras City Police.
- Kedar Singh, Naik, Civil Police, Jhansi, United Provinces.
- Sadhu Ram Chaudhri, Superintendent, Punjab Police.
- Mumtaz Khan, Foot Constable, Ferozepur, Punjab Police.
- Ahmad Khan, Foot Constable, Rohtak, Punjab Police.
- Mohammad Shafi Khan, Foot Constable, Rohtak, Punjab Police.
- Teja Singh, Assistant Sub-Inspector, North-West Frontier Province Police.
- Faqir Mohamad, Head Constable, Peshawar, North-West Frontier Province Police.
- Mahmud Shah, Sub-Inspector, North-West Frontier Province Police.
- Mohammad Khan, Head Constable, Peshawar, North-West Frontier Province Police.
- Umax Gul, Foot Constable, Peshawar, North-West Frontier Province Police.
- Muhammad Hussain, Foot Constable, Quetta-Pishin District Police, Baluchistan.
- Anar Gul, Foot Constable, North-West Frontier Province Police. (posthumously)

Burma

- Captain Reginald Francis Page, Assistant Commandant, Burma Frontier Force.

Colonies, Protectorates and Mandated Territories

- Walter Marsh, Sergeant-Major of Police, Mauritius
- Adrien Esperance Roussel, Police Constable, Mauritius

For Distinguished Service

England and Wales

- Lieutenant-Colonel Herbert Patrick Hunter, CBE Chief Constable, Staffordshire Constabulary.
- Major Lyndon Henry Morris, MC Chief Constable, Devon Constabulary.
- Tom Blackburn, Chief Constable, Tynemouth Borough Police Force.
- Samuel Flowers Butler, OBE Chief Constable, Ramsgate Borough Police Force.
- Henry Sheasby, Chief Constable, Macclesfield Borough Police Force.
- William Henry Smith, Chief Constable, Eastbourne Borough Police Force.
- Edwin Tilley, Chief Constable, Wolverhampton Borough Police Force.
- Frank Rowland Palmer, MBE Assistant Chief Constable, Manchester City Police Force.
- Peter Gregson, MBE Chief Superintendent, Lancashire Constabulary.
- James Smith, Chief Superintendent, Hull City Police Force.
- Robert Willcox Brown, Superintendent and Deputy Chief Constable, Somerset Con.stabulary.
- William John Matthews, Superintendent and Deputy Chief Constable, Cornwall Con.stabulary.
- Arthur Cotterell, Superintendent, Monmouthshire Constabulary.
- Henry James, Superintendent, Glamorganshire Constabulary.
- William Henry Francis Mead, Superintendent, Plymouth City Police Force.
- Albert Pentland, Superintendent, Nottingham City Police Force.
- George Blackburn, Chief Inspector, West Riding of Yorkshire Constabulary.

Scotland

- Joseph Neilans, Chief Constable, Dundee City Police Force.
- Walter Doherty, Assistant Chief Constable, Glasgow City Police Force.
- Hugh McPhee, Superintendent and Deputy Chief Constable, Fife Constabulary.

Northern Ireland

Australia

- Frederick James Collings, First Class Superintendent, New South Wales Police Force.
- Percival Aldridge Giles, lately Superintendent, South Australian Police Force.
- Michael Joseph McMahon, lately Inspector, South Australian Police Force.
- Tom Oscar Mattin, lately Superintendent, South Australian Police Force.
- William Parker Prior, Detective Superintendent, First Class, New South Wales Police Force.

India

- Hugh Dallas Latham, Assistant District Superintendent of Police, Officiating as Deputy Commissioner of Police, Madras.
- Babu Mohini Mohan Sanyal, Inspector, Bengal Police.
- Chaudhri Kirpal Singh, Deputy Superintendent of Police, Benares, United Provinces.
- Reginald Arthur Proctor Hare, Superintendent, Bihar Police.
- Lieutenant-Colonel Rawdon Douglas Wright, Commandant, 2nd (Lakhimpur) Battalion, Assam Rifles, Sadiya.
- Khan Saheb Enamul Huq, Inspector, Orissa Police.
- N. Chandrasekharan Nair, Acting First Grade Inspector, Travancore State Police.

Burma

- Lieutenant-Colonel Hugh Francis Eardley Childers, CIE Commandant, Burma Frontier Force, Reserve Battalion, Pyawbwe, Burma.

Colonies, Protectorates and Mandated Territories

- Abdul Qadir Bey al Jundi, Assistant Commandant, Arab Legion, Trans-Jordan.
- Major John Bagot Glubb, OBE MC Second-in-Command, Arab Legion, Trans-Jordan.
- Edwin Kingsley Laws, Assistant Superintendent of Police, Kenya.
- Cecil Vernon Shepherd Tesseyman, DCM Deputy Superintendent of Police, Palestine.
- David Douglas MacDonald McGoun, Assistant Superintendent of Police, Kenya.
- Herbert Edward Stevens, Superintendent, Municipal Fire Brigade, Singapore, Straits Settlements.
- Major William Frederick Wainwright, OBE District Superintendent of Police, Palestine.
