= John George Hay =

British industrialist

Sir John George Hay
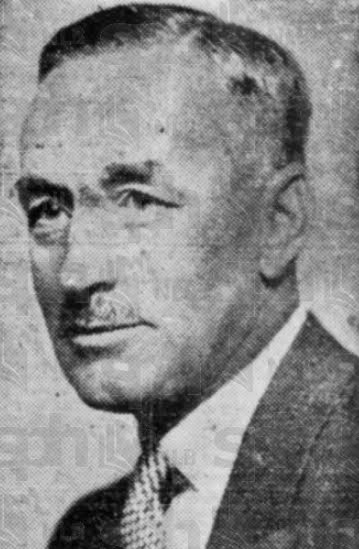
- Hay from a 1936 publication
- Born: 1 February 1888
- Died: 26 May 1964 (aged 76)
- Occupation: Industrialist (rubber)
- Years active: 1904-1963
- Organization: Guthrie & Co
- Spouse: Constance Maye Leveritt
- Children: 1 son and 2 daughters

Sir John George Hay (1 February 1888 – 26 May 1964) was a British industrialist. He was a leading figure in the global rubber industry from the 1930s to the 1960s.

== Early life ==
Sir John George Hay, son of Peter Hay of Aberdeen, was the seventh child in a family of ten. His father was a shopkeeper in Fife who went bankrupt and left the family impoverished. When he was 17, he went to work in a draper's shop in Aberdeen and studied in the evenings for an accountancy qualification. After working as a clerk at Aberdeen railway station, he went to London and joined the old-established firm of Guthrie & Co.

== Career ==
In 1904, after joining Guthrie & Co. as a clerk in its cashier's department, Hay worked his way up in the company becoming head of its corporate section in 1918 dealing with flotations for rubber interests at the London Stock Exchange, and in 1925, was appointed general manager. In 1929, he became vice-chairman of the Rubber Growers' Association, and from 1930-1 served as chairman.

In 1934, Hay became head of Guthrie & Co. when the company had become one of the largest rubber producers in the world. During the economic depression in the 1930s, he was credited with saving the rubber industry in Malaya where the company had large investments through an extensive network of companies and agencies. In 1934, he was chiefly responsible for the introduction of the International Rubber Regulation Scheme, in the face of initial opposition from the rubber industry in the Far East, by persuading producers to agree to cuts in production which raised the price of rubber which had severely declined.

In the late 1930s, he established in a stockpile of rubber for use by the military in Malaya which was exported shortly before the invasion of Malaya by the Japanese in 1941. In 1940, he became chairman of the Rubber Grower's Association. During the Second World War, he went to the United States to negotiate with the government on the supply of rubber for use during the war. After the end of the war, he was involved in restoring the rubber industry in Malaya, as a member of the Malayan Planning Unit responsible for rebuilding Malaya, and as a founding member and director of the Malay Rubber Estate Owners' Company, formed in 1945 to rehabilitate the rubber estates and restore production to pre-war levels. In addition to being a member of the Rubber Consultation Committee representing various business interests in the Far East, he was also a member of the Colonial Economic Advisory Committee which consulted with the British government on post-war economic policy.

By 1950, Guthrie & Co.'s investment in Malaya was estimated at M$300 million with 150,000 acres of rubber plantations and interests in palm oil and tin. Hay owned around one-sixth of the company and sat on the boards of dozens of rubber producers, often as chairman. He was also board member of the Mercantile Bank of India, serving as its deputy chairman in 1954.

In 1963, aged 75, Hay was forced to resign from Guthrie & Co. on the advice of bankers and financiers in the City of London after a boardroom dispute.

== Personal life and death ==
Hay married Constance Maye Leveritt in 1910, and they had one son and two daughters. He died on 26 May 1964, aged 76.

== Honours ==
Hay received a knighthood in the 1939 New Year's Honours. In 1961, he had Datoship conferred on him in Malaysia by the Yang di-Pertuan Agong.
