= 1939 New Year Honours (New Zealand) =

Annual awards for New Zealanders

The 1939 New Year Honours in New Zealand were appointments by King George VI to various orders and honours to reward and highlight good works by New Zealanders. The awards celebrated the passing of 1938 and the beginning of 1939, and were announced on 3 January 1939.

The recipients of honours are displayed here as they were styled before their new honour.

== Knight Bachelor ==
- Charles Manley Luke JP – of Wellington. For public services.
- The Honourable Henry Hubert Ostler – senior puisne judge of the Supreme Court of New Zealand.
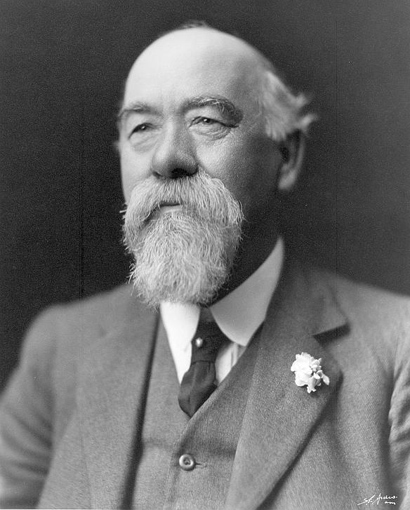
Sir Charles Luke

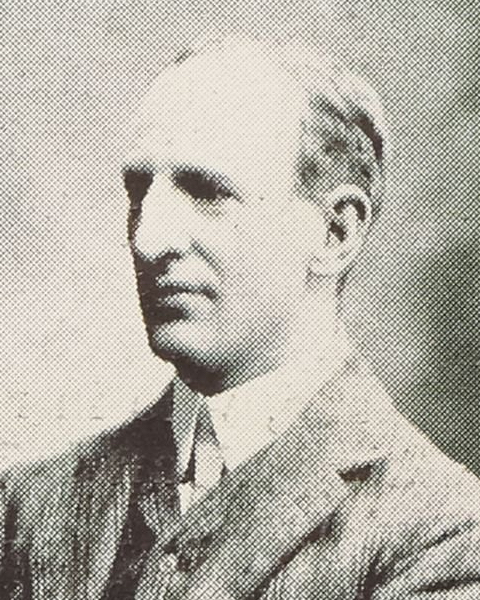
Sir Hubert Ostler

== Order of Saint Michael and Saint George ==
=== Companion (CMG) ===
- Arthur Telford Donnelly LLB – of Christchurch. For public services.
- Thomas Donald Horn Hall LLB – of Wellington; clerk of the House of Representatives.
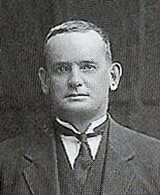
Arthur Donnelly

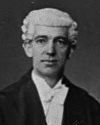
Thomas Hall

== Order of the British Empire ==
=== Commander (CBE) ===
Civil division

- Thomas Reginald Aickin – of Wellington; private secretary to the Minister of Finance.
- Arthur William Mulligan – of Wellington; general secretary, National Centennial Office, Department of Internal Affairs.

Military division

- Group Captain the Honourable Ralph Alexander Cochrane AFC – Royal Air Force; Air Department, Wellington.
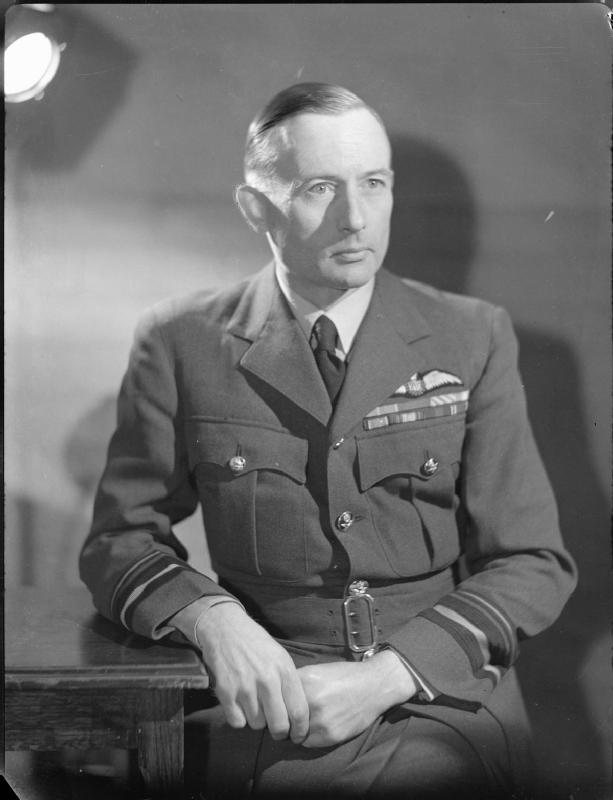
Ralph Cochrane

=== Officer (OBE) ===
Civil division

- Sidney John Harrison – of Wellington; general secretary of the New Zealand Returned Soldiers' Association.
- Dr Alice Woodward Horsley MB ChB – medical practitioner, Auckland. For social welfare services.
- Samuel Saltzman – of Dunedin. For benefactions to humanitarian institutions.

Military division

- Major Stanley Herbert Crump – New Zealand Staff Corps; deputy quartermaster-general and director of supplies and transport, Army Headquarters, Wellington.

=== Member (MBE) ===
Civil division

- Beatrice Alice Campbell – matron of the public hospital, New Plymouth
- Isabel Mona Corkill – Nurse Maude District Nursing Association, Christchurch.
- Nora Philomena Fitzgibbon – nursing adviser to the Plunket Society, Dunedin.
- Mary Fanny Gaby – lady corps superintendent of the St John Ambulance Brigade, Wellington.
- Mary Josephine Martin – matron of the Sunnyside Mental Hospital, Christchurch.
- Cecilia McKenny – of Pahiatua; president of the New Zealand Registered Nurses' Association.
- Janet Anne Moore – nurse instructor in the Department of Health, Wellington.

Military division

- Warrant Officer Class II (Staff Sergeant-Major) George Ferguson MacCulloch – regimental sergeant-major, Army School of Instruction, Trentham.

== British Empire Medal (BEM) ==
Military division

- Chief Petty Officer Writer Archie Victor Styles – New Zealand Naval Forces, Wellington.
