= John Baguley (judge) =

British colonial judge (1859–1932)

Sir John Minty Baguley
- Born: 21 June 1880
- Died: 13 April 1964 (aged 83); Putney, London
- Education: Pembroke College, Cambridge
- Occupation: Colonial judge

Sir John Minty Baguley (21 June 1880 – 13 April 1964) was a British colonial judge in British Burma. He was judge of the High Court of Judicature at Rangoon between 1930 and 1940.

== Early life and education ==
Baguley was born on 21 June 1880 in London, the son of John Edward Baguley and Pauline née Minty. He was educated at St Paul's School, London and Pembroke College, Cambridge.

== Career ==
Baguley entered the Indian Civil Service in 1903 after competitive examination and arrived in Burma in 1904. He first officiated in the High Court in 1924. In 1930, he was appointed a Judge of the High Court of Judicature at Rangoon and remained on the bench until his retirement in 1940.

== Personal life and death ==
Baguley married Laura Crawley who died in 1959. There were no children.

Baguley died on 13 April 1964 at Putney, London, aged 83.

== Honours ==
Baguley was created a Knight Bachelor in the 1939 New Year Honours.
