= Burnside West Christchurch University Cricket Club =

Cricket club in Canterbury, New Zealand

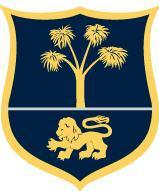
Burnside-West Christchurch University Cricket Club Emblem

Burnside West Christchurch University Cricket Club or BWCUCC is a New Zealand cricket club that plays at Burnside Park, Christchurch. It is one of the oldest cricket clubs in Christchurch, having been established in 1905.

As of the start of the 2016/17 season the club had 11 adult teams which played in several grades in the Christchurch Metropolitan Cricket Association. The club also had 10 junior Saturday teams in and a Friday night league for younger cricketers (school years 1–3).

The club was established in its current format after West Christchurch Cricket Club merged with University Cricket, and then, subsequently, merged with Burnside Cricket.

A number of the club's players have represented the provincial Canterbury cricket team, with some going on to play internationally for the New Zealand national cricket team

== History ==
The first meeting of the West Christchurch club was held on 31 August 1905 at Municipal Chambers Building on the corner of Worcester Street and Oxford Terrace, presided over by Canon Hare. The colours of the club were registered as dark and light blue, and the crest was the rampant lion with the raised tail that is still part of the present club's emblem.

== Notable players ==
Club members who have played international cricket include:

- Tom Latham (New Zealand)
- George Worker (New Zealand)
- Brian Hastings (New Zealand)
- Graham Dowling (New Zealand)
- Martin Donnelly (New Zealand)
- Jack Kerr (New Zealand)
- Roger Blunt (New Zealand)
- Gary Bartlett (New Zealand)
- Sammy Guillen (West Indies and New Zealand)
- Will O'Rourke
- Mitchell Hay

In addition, Arthur Donnelly and Dan Reese were members of the club who had significant administrative roles in New Zealand cricket.

== Club patrons ==
- 1906–1907 Canon Hare
- 1907–1934 Sir Henry Wigram
- 1934–1935 Lady Wigram
- 1935–1954 Sir Arthur Donnelly
- 1954–1961 WS MacGibbon
- 1961–1962 Prof FLlewellyn
- 1962–1966 Dr LL Pownall
- 1967–1977 Prof NC Phillips
- 1977–2005 Jack Kerr
- 2005–2015 Graham Dowling
- 2015– Grant Dickson
