= Janet Moore =

Janet Ann Moore MBE (5 February 1880 – 11 January 1968) was a New Zealand civilian and army nurse, nursing administrator, and hospital matron. She was born in Hanley Castle, Worcestershire, England, on 5 February 1880.

In the 1939 New Year Honours, Moore was appointed a Member of the Order of the British Empire.
