= Hubert Ostler =

New Zealand farmer, lawyer, judge

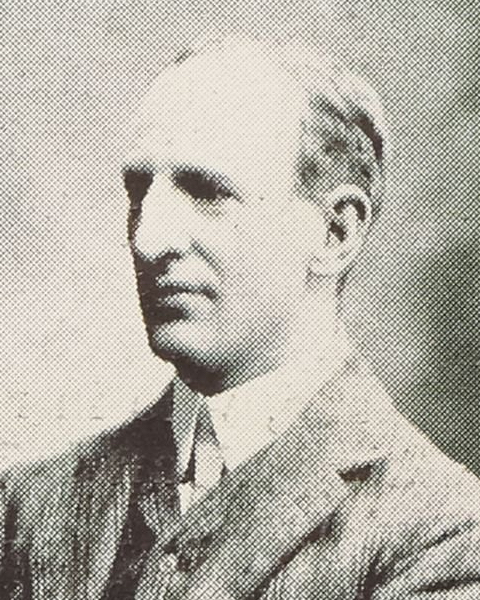
Ostler, c. 1909

Sir Henry Hubert Ostler KC (2 July 1876 – 24 February 1944) was a New Zealand farmer, lawyer and judge. He was born in Ben Ohau Station, South Canterbury, New Zealand, in 1876.

In 1925, on the same day that Ostler took silk, he was also appointed to the Supreme Court (now known as the High Court of New Zealand). In 1935, Ostler was awarded the King George V Silver Jubilee Medal. He was appointed a Knight Bachelor in the 1939 New Year Honours.
