= Arthur Donnelly =

New Zealand lawyer and sports administrator

Sir Arthur Donnelly KBE CMG
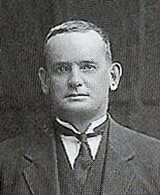
- Born: Arthur Telford Donnelly; 6 June 1890; Christchurch, New Zealand
- Died: 1 February 1954 (aged 63); Christchurch, New Zealand
- Education: Christchurch Boys' High School; Canterbury University College
- Occupation: Lawyer

Sir Arthur Telford Donnelly KBE CMG (6 June 1890 – 1 February 1954) was a New Zealand lawyer and sports administrator, and chairman of the Bank of New Zealand.

== Life and career ==
Born in Christchurch, Donnelly was educated at Christchurch Boys' High School and Canterbury College. He qualified as a solicitor at 19 and as a barrister at 20, and joined his father's Christchurch law firm, Raymond, Stringer, Hamilton and Donnelly. He served as a sergeant with the New Zealand Expeditionary Force in France in World War I.

A club cricketer with the West Christchurch cricket club from 1908 to 1922, he was a life member of the New Zealand Cricket Council, of which he was chairman of committee for ten years from 1928 and President from 1946 to 1948. He managed the New Zealand cricket team in England in 1931, and played in one of the non-first-class matches at the end of the tour. He was a steward of the Canterbury Jockey Club.

Donnelly was appointed Crown Solicitor for Christchurch in 1921, and became chairman of the Bank of New Zealand in April 1937. He was appointed a Companion of the Order of St Michael and St George, for public services, in the 1939 New Year Honours, and a Knight Commander of the Order of the British Empire in the 1949 New Year Honours. In 1953, Donnelly was awarded the Queen Elizabeth II Coronation Medal.
