= George Park =

George Park may refer to:

- George Park (politician) (1914–1994), British Labour Party politician
- George Park (swimmer), Canadian swimmer
- George S. Park (1811–1890), Texas War of Independence hero and founder of Parkville, Missouri, Park University and Manhattan, Kansas
- George Eamon Park (1916–1975), member of the Provincial Parliament of Ontario
- George John Park (1880–1977), New Zealand teacher and technical college principal
- George Watt Park (1853–1935), American horticulturist and businessman
- George Winter Park (1834–1901), American politician in the Massachusetts House of Representatives
- George Park (Portland, Oregon), a public park in Portland, Oregon's St. Johns neighborhood
