= Arthur Nevill =

New Zealand air marshal (1899–1985)

Sir Arthur Nevill
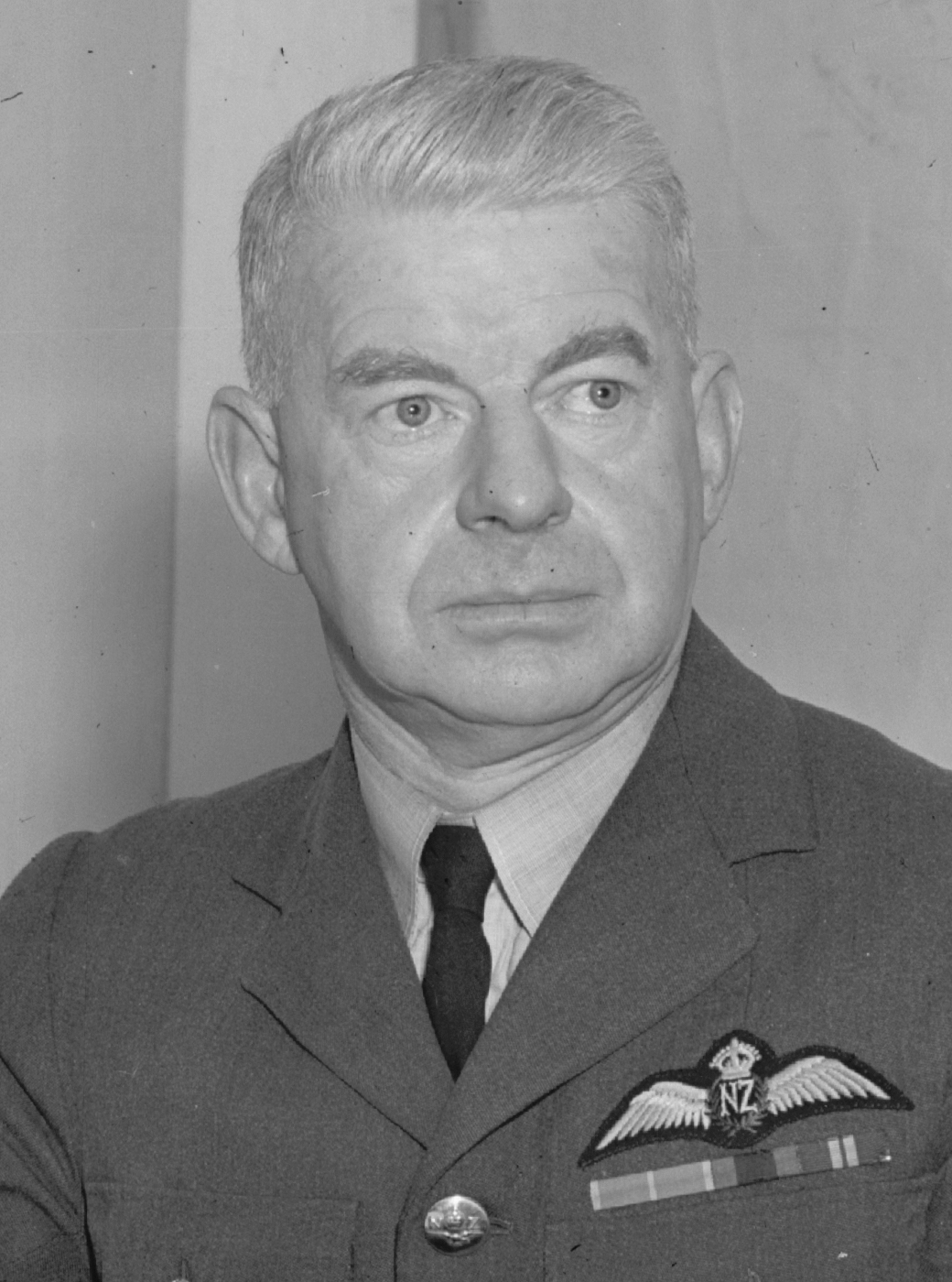
- Born: 29 April 1899
- Died: 14 March 1985 (aged 85)
- Military career
- Allegiance: New Zealand
- Branch: New Zealand Army; Royal New Zealand Air Force
- Service years: 1916–1951
- Rank: Air Vice Marshal
- Commands: Chief of the Air Staff (1946–51); RNZAF Overseas Headquarters (1942–43)
- Conflicts: Second World War
- Awards: Knight Commander of the Order of the British Empire; Companion of the Order of the Bath

Air Vice Marshal Sir Arthur de Terrotte Nevill, KBE, CB (29 April 1899 – 14 March 1985) was a New Zealand military aviator and administrator.

== Biography ==
The brother of Geoffrey, who would later become Resident Commissioner of the Cook Islands, Nevill attended the Royal Military College of Australia from 1916 until 1919 and was appointed a lieutenant in the New Zealand Army in 1919 and held various staff and regimental appointments in New Zealand from 1921 until 1930 when he transferred to the New Zealand Permanent Air Force at its establishment on 1 April 1930.

During that time he had been appointed as New Zealand Liaison Officer to the Air Ministry and he continued there until 1935.

In 1937 he was appointed as Air Member for Supply to the Air Board of the newly organised Royal New Zealand Air Force (RNZAF). As such he was responsible for all of the logistics activities of the RNZAF. As a result of this appointment he was then appointed in 1942 as Air Officer Commanding RNZAF Headquarters in London until 1943.

In 1944 he was returned to New Zealand and appointed Vice Chief of Air Staff, and then in 1946 to Chief of Air Staff until January 1951. During this period his administration coped with the RNZAF at its greatest establishment of manpower, that were being, or had been, employed in most war theatres from Europe to the western Pacific, and then through a period of demobilisation when airmen were employed on many make work tasks and flying was minimised to save money. During this period, too, there were so-called strikes when airmen and other servicemen and women throughout New Zealand used "refusing to cooperate with orders" tactics to get demobilised more quickly.

Most of the aircraft employed by the air force were subject to Lend Lease rules and were required to be returned to US control, or destroyed. Most were destroyed, some later than the extent of his administration. He also had to endure the effect of a home government that decided to support Britain (financially) by ordering a small fleet of pre-wartime and wartime designed aircraft, for example 100 Mosquitos, for which no useful service was contemplated. Only twelve ever flew in New Zealand and they were soon mothballed.

However he was also responsible for the initiation of a series of orders for aircraft such as the Vampire, Devon, Type 170 Freighter and Hastings C Mk3 that were to see service well into the 1960s, and some beyond that.

== Honours and awards ==
Nevill was appointed a Commander of the Order of the British Empire in the 1941 New Year Honours. In the 1946 King's Birthday Honours, he was appointed a Companion of the Order of the Bath (CB). In the 1950 New Year Honours, he was promoted to Knight Commander of the Order of the British Empire. In 1953, he was awarded the Queen Elizabeth II Coronation Medal.

== Later life ==
Retiring from the RNZAF in 1951, Nevill was later appointed an Honorary Doctor of the University of Waikato. He died on 14 March 1985 in Wellington. A street in Hobsonville, in Auckland, is named for him.

Military offices
Preceded by Air Commodore Leonard Isitt	Air Officer Commanding RNZAF Overseas Headquarters; 1942–1943	Unknown
Preceded by Air Vice Marshal Leonard Isitt	Chief of the Air Staff; 1946–1951	Succeeded by Air Vice Marshal David Carnegie
