= Geoffrey Nevill =

Geoffrey Nevill may refer to:

- Geoffrey Nevill (malacologist) (1843–1885), British malacologist
- Geoffrey Nevill (resident commissioner) (1900–1972), New Zealand public servant who served as Resident Commissioner of the Cook Islands and the Chatham Islands
