= Ernest Wilson (New Zealand cricketer) =

New Zealand cricketer (1877–1959)

Personal information
- Full name: Ernest Summers Wilson
- Born: 31 March 1877; Dunedin, Otago, New Zealand
- Died: 13 July 1959 (aged 82); Dunedin, Otago, New Zealand

Domestic team information
- Years: Team
- 1927/28: Otago
- Source: ESPNcricinfo, 28 May 2016

Ernest Summers Wilson MBE (31 March 1877 – 13 July 1959) was a New Zealand cricketer. He played one first-class match for Otago in unusual circumstances during the 1927–28 season.

Wilson was born at Dunedin in 1877. He worked as a company secretary and was the secretary of the Otago Cricket Association, the Otago Rugby Football Union, the Otago lawn tennis association, the Dunedin Operatic Society and the Dunedin Competitions Society. He played lawn bowls and was active as an administrator in the sport as well.

In his role at the cricket association, he managed the Otago team and was at the Basin Reserve in Wellington in January 1928 when Laurie Eastman was injured after bowling five overs. Wilson did not bat in Otago's first innings―with Eastman recorded as absent hurt―but was allowed to bat in Otago's second innings as they followed on. He scored eight not out in a heavy defeat at the age of 50. This was his only first-class match.

Wilson married and had a son. He died at Dunedin in 1959 aged 82. He had been awarded the MBE in the 1955 New Years Honours.
