= 1956 Cook Islands general election =

- March 1956

General elections were held in the Cook Islands in March 1956. The elections took the form of an election to Rarotonga Island Council, whose sole European member also automatically became the only elected member of the Legislative Council. Incumbent member Henley McKegg was narrowly re-elected, defeating R.J.A. Ingram by three votes.

== Electoral system ==
The Cook Islands Legislative Council consisted of ten members elected by island councils (four from Rarotonga and six from smaller islands), ten civil servants appointed by the Governor-General of New Zealand (the Chief Medical Officer, the Director of Agriculture, the Education Officer, six Resident Agents and the Treasurer) and the Resident Commissioner, who was president of the council. The sole European member of Rarotonga Island Council automatically became the island's representative in the Legislative Council, and was the only member of the Legislative Council to be directly elected.

Elections to Rarotonga Island Council were held every three years, with the six Cook Islander members elected from single-member constituencies based on the land survey districts, and the European member from the entire island.

== Results ==
=== European member ===
| Candidate | Votes | % | Notes |
|---|---|---|---|
| Henley McKegg | 65 | 51.18 | Re-elected |
| R.J.A. Ingram | 62 | 48.82 | |
| Total | 127 | 100.00 | |
| Valid votes | 127 | 98.45 | |
| Invalid/blank votes | 2 | 1.55 | |
| Total votes | 129 | 100.00 | |
Source: Pacific Islands Monthly

=== Cook Islander members ===
In the Cook Islander seats, voter turnout was higher than any previous election. The Cook Islands Progressive Association won three of the six seats, with another party member finishing joint first in a tied seat.
