= James McLeod =

James McLeod or James MacLeod may refer to:

- James Macleod (1836–1894), Scottish-born Canadian politician and judge
- James McLeod (Medal of Honor) (1836–40 – 1898), petty officer who received the Medal of Honor in 1862
- James William McLeod (1871–1931), Ontario farmer and political figure
- James McLeod (politician) (1882–1944), member of the New Zealand Legislative Council
- James Walter McLeod (1887–1978), Scottish physician and bacteriologist.
- James C. McLeod (physician) (1897–1947), physician from Florence County who ran in the South Carolina gubernatorial election, 1946
- Jim McLeod (baseball) (1908—1981), American baseball player
- Jimmy McLeod (1937–2019), Canadian ice hockey player
- James E. McLeod (1944–2011), American academic
- James MacLeod (rower) (born 1953), British Olympic rower
- James Macleod (Royal Navy officer) (born 1970), British admiral
