= 1929 New Year Honours (New Zealand) =

Annual awards for New Zealanders

The 1929 New Year Honours in New Zealand were appointments by King George V on the advice of the New Zealand government to various orders and honours to reward and highlight good works by New Zealanders. The awards celebrated the passing of 1928 and the beginning of 1929, but their announcement was delayed until 28 February because of the King's health.

The recipients of honours are displayed here as they were styled before their new honour.

== Knight Bachelor ==
- Carrick Hey Robertson MB FRCS LRCP – of Auckland.
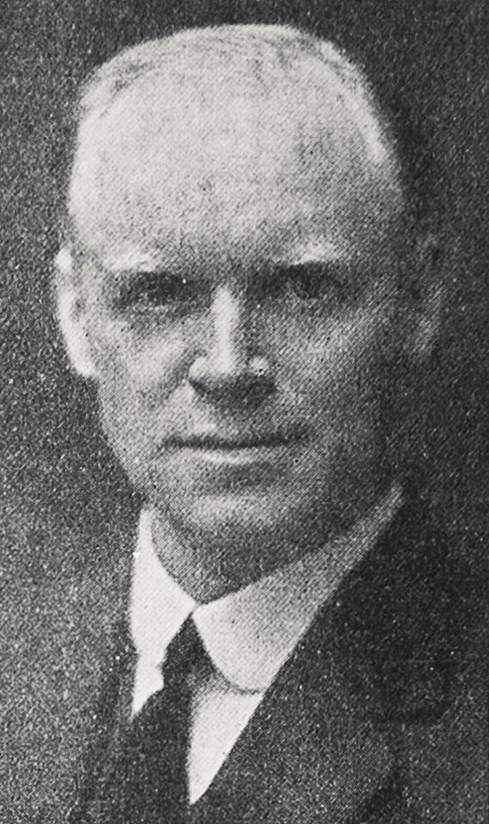
Sir Carrick Robertson

== Order of Saint Michael and Saint George ==
=== Knight Commander (KCMG) ===
- The Honourable William Nosworthy – of Ashburton; formerly a member of the Executive Council.
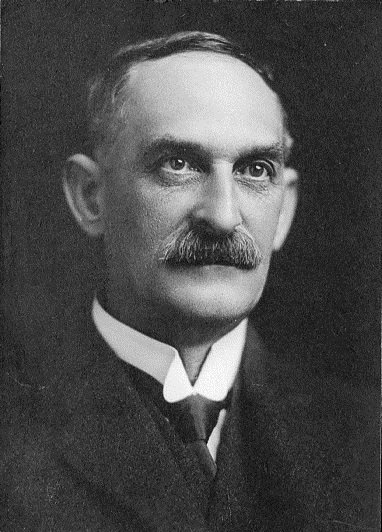
Sir William Nosworthy

=== Companion (CMG) ===
- Hugh Fraser Ayson – of Rarotonga; resident commissioner and chief judge of the High Court and of the Native Land Court, Cook Islands.
- John William MacDonald – of Wellington; public trustee.
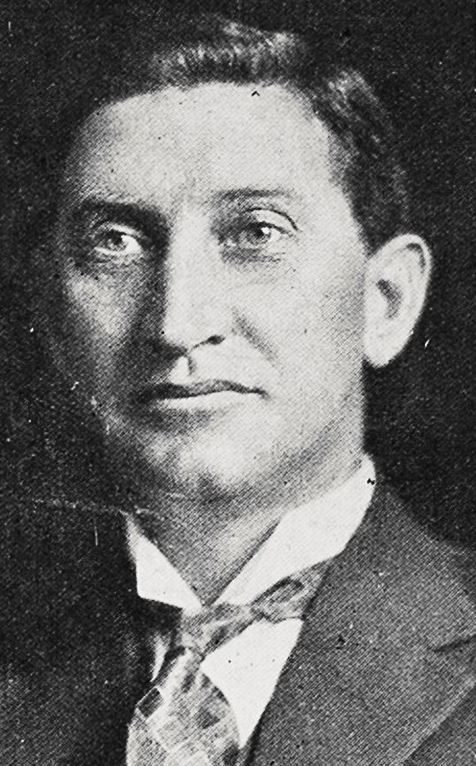
Hugh Ayson

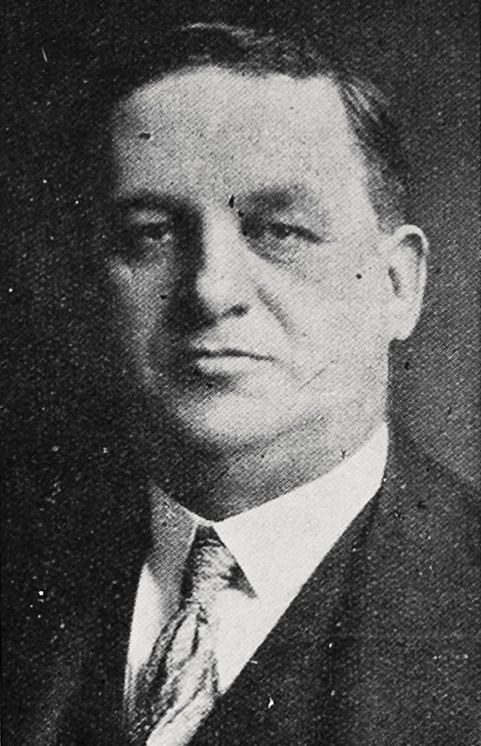
John William MacDonald

== Order of the British Empire ==
=== Commander (CBE) ===
Civil division

- John Baird Thompson – of Wellington; under-secretary, Lands and Survey Department.
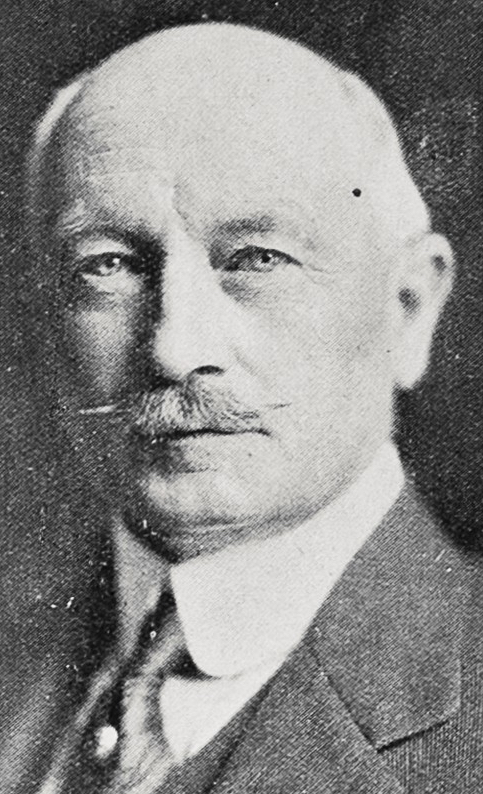
John Baird Thompson
