= Mary Gonzaga Leahy =

New Zealand nun and hospital matron

Mary Gonzaga Leahy OBE (born Ellen Leahy; 12 June 1870 – 17 January 1958), known as Mother Mary Gonzaga, was a New Zealand Catholic nun and matron of the Mater Misericordiae Hospital in Auckland.

Gonzaga was born in Waimea West, Nelson, New Zealand, on 12 June 1870. She became a novitiate in the Sisters of Mercy in 1894 taking her vows in 1897 just before beginning her nursing training at St Vincent's Hospital in Sydney. In 1898 she interrupted her training to become the matron of the hospital in Coromandel. She returned to St Vincent's with Mother Mary Agnes Canty in 1902 to complete her training before they both joined the staff of the Mater Misericordiae Hospital which was opened by the Sisters of Mercy order in 1900.

In 1929 as a new hospital block was being planned Gonzaga and Mary Agnes travelled to the United States to study trends in hospital buildings; they then worked with architect Daniel Paterson on the new building's design. From 1937 to 1950 she was the hospital's matron and in charge of the operating theatres, working with surgeon Carrick Robertson as his theatre sister. In 1937 the Mater opened a school for nursing training and Gonzaga was instrumental in obtaining approval and registration for the school after the law was changed allowing nursing training to take place in private hospitals.

Gonzaga was acknowledged as one of the key people in the growth and development of the Mater, along with Mary Agnes. She was known for her vision, energy, dedication and ability as an administrator, fundraiser and financial manager all of which contributed to making the Mater a major surgical hospital.

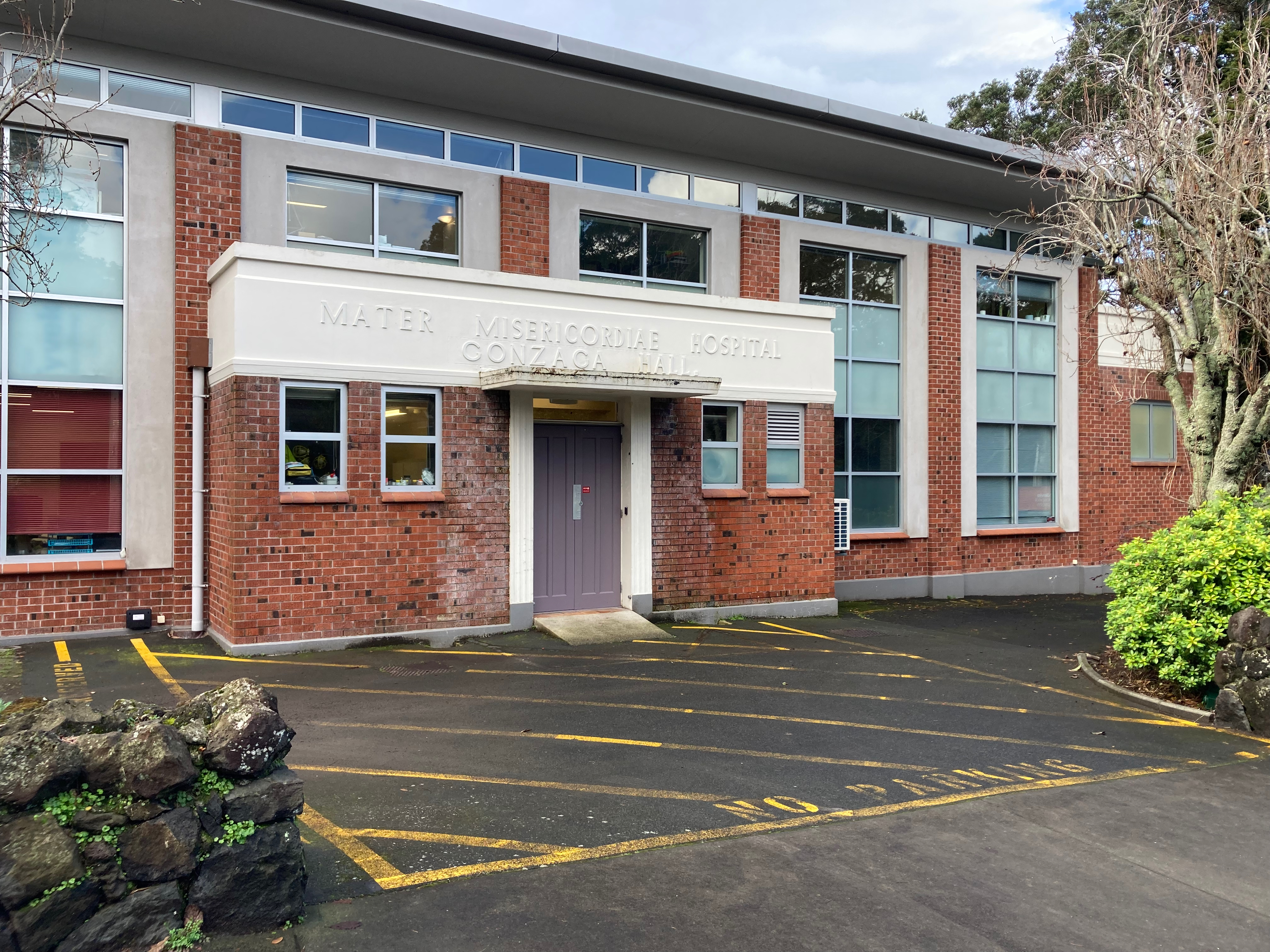
Gonzaga Hall, Mountain Rd, Auckland

Gonzaga died in the Mater on 17 January 1958. She was buried with Mary Agnes in the Hillsborough cemetery.

== Honours and awards ==
Leahy was awarded the King George V Jubilee Medal in 1936. In the 1939 King's Birthday Honours Leahy was appointed an Officer of the Order of the British Empire in recognition of her service as matron of the Mater Misericordiae Hospital. In 1953 she was awarded the Queen Elizabeth II Coronation Medal.
