= 1953 Cook Islands general election =

- 1953

General elections were held in the Cook Islands in 1953. The elections took the form of an election to Rarotonga Island Council, whose sole European member also automatically became the only elected member of the Legislative Council.

== Electoral system ==
The Cook Islands Legislative Council consisted of ten members elected by island councils (four from Rarotonga and six from smaller islands), ten civil servants appointed by the Governor-General of New Zealand (the Chief Medical Officer, the Director of Agriculture, the Education Officer, six Resident Agents and the Treasurer) and the Resident Commissioner, who was president of the council. The sole European member of Rarotonga Island Council automatically became the island's representative in the Legislative Council, and was the only member of the Legislative Council to be directly elected.

Elections to Rarotonga Island Council were held every three years, with the six Cook Islander members elected from single-member constituencies based on the land survey districts, and the European member from the entire island.

== Results ==
Incumbent MLC Willie Watson was defeated by Henley McKegg. This was attributed by Pacific Islands Monthly to Watson's criticism of the colonial administration, as more than half of the registered voters were civil servants or their partners.

Candidate	Votes	%	Notes
Henley McKegg	66	54.10	Elected
Willie Watson	37	30.33	Unseated
Scott	19	15.57	
Total	122	100.00	
Valid votes	122	98.39	
Invalid/blank votes	2	1.61	
Total votes	124	100.00	
Registered voters/turnout	134	92.54	
Source: Pacific Islands Monthly
