= Edith Campbell =

Canadian nurse in World War I

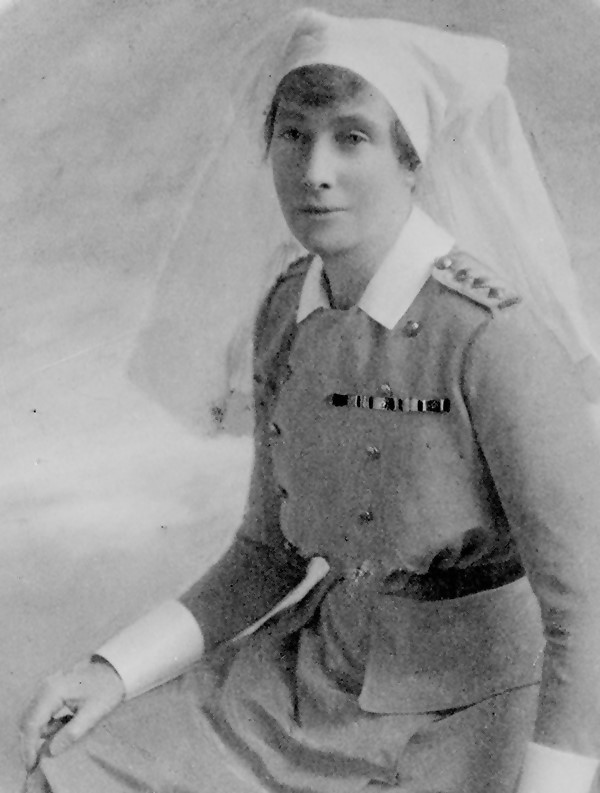
- Edith Campbell in c. 1918
- Born: 12 December 1871; Montreal, Quebec, Canada
- Died: 1951 (aged 79–80)
- Military career
- Allegiance: Canada
- Branch: Canadian Expeditionary Force
- Service years: 1914–1919
- Rank: Matron
- Unit: Canadian Army Medical Corps
- Conflicts: First World War
- Awards: Royal Red Cross; Military Medal; Mentioned in Despatches

Edith Campbell, RRC, MM (12 December 1871 – 1951) was a Canadian nurse. She served with the Canadian Army Medical Corps in the First World War and was one of the first Canadian nurses to arrive in England to assist in the establishment of the Duchess of Connaught Canadian Red Cross Hospital, a field hospital in Taplow, Buckinghamshire, and serve during the First World War. She later served on the Western Front, being awarded the Royal Red Cross, first class, and the Military Medal. She was also twice mentioned in despatches.

After the war, she was superintendent of the Toronto Branch of the Victorian Order of Nurses. Her medals and a number of her personal items are held by the Canadian War Museum.

== Early life ==
Edith Campbell was born in 1871 in Montreal, Quebec. She was from a 'medical family'; her grandfather – Francis Wayland Campbell – was dean of the Medical Faculty of Bishop's College and her father and uncle were both physicians. She was known as "Daisy" at home. In 1907 she graduated from the school of nursing at New York's Presbyterian Hospital and subsequently worked in Manhattan and Montreal.

== First World War ==
Campbell enlisted in the Canadian Army Medical Corps in September 1914 at the age of 42. She arrived in the United Kingdom on 24 October 1914 on the HMT Franconia. She and her Canadian Army Nursing Service peers were known as "bluebirds" due to their blue nursing uniforms.

As one of the first Canadian nurses to arrive at Cliveden, Campbell first assisted in the establishment of the Duchess of Connaught Canadian Red Cross Hospital, a field hospital in Taplow, Buckinghamshire, where Sir William Osler was the head physician. In April 1915, she was appointed its inaugural matron.

While at Cliveden, Campbell was involved in a scandal known as "The Taplow scandal" or "Taplow affair" that included allegations of affairs, dishonesty, inappropriate treatment, drunkenness, and of nurses being overworked, not all relating to the actions of Campbell. Campbell and Charles Gorrell were removed from their posts. Gorrell and another man subsequently committed suicide. Campbell stated to Osler, as he attempted to reinstate her reputation, that "the worst wars are not all in the trenches". Osler believed that Campbell had been unjustly dealt with and in response, threatened to resign. Discussion of the affair was forbidden in the Osler household and Campbell did not regain her position as matron.

On 22 June 1915, Campbell was mentioned in despatches for her actions in England and France, and in October of that year she received the Royal Red Cross, first class. She returned to France in 1916, and was subsequently mentioned in despatches for a second time in 1917 for her bravery during enemy air raids at No. 1 Canadian General Hospital in Étaples, France, during which she attended to wounded nurses. For this, she and five other nurses received the Military Medal on 25 September 1918. Her citation read:

For gallantry and devotion to duty during an enemy air raid. Regardless of personal danger she attended to the wounded sisters and by her personal example inspired the sisters under her charge.

Campbell's other medals include the 1914 Star, the British War Medal, the Victory Medal and the 1935 Jubilee Medal. She continued to serve with the Canadian Expeditionary Force until April 1919, when she was demobilised and returned to Canada.

== Later life ==
On her return to Canada, Campbell became superintendent of the Toronto Branch of the Victorian Order of Nurses. She retired in 1934.

== Death and legacy ==
Edith Campbell died in 1951. A collection of her medals and personal affects and letters is held by the Canadian War Museum.
