= King George V Silver Jubilee Medal =

- Type: Commemorative medal
- Awarded for: community contribution
- Presented by: United Kingdom and Commonwealth
- Eligibility: Commonwealth citizens
- Clasps: None
- Established: 6 May 1935

Highlights
- Total: 85,234
- Ribbon bar

Precedence
- Next (higher): King George V Durbar Medal
- Next (lower): King George VI Coronation Medal

The King George V Silver Jubilee Medal is a commemorative medal, instituted to celebrate the 25th anniversary of the accession of King George V.

== Issue ==
This medal was awarded as a personal souvenir by King George V to commemorate his Silver Jubilee. It was awarded to the Royal Family and selected officers of state, officials and servants of the Royal Household, ministers, government officials, mayors, public servants, local government officials, members of the navy, army, air force and police in Britain, her colonies and Dominions.

For Coronation and Jubilee medals, the practice up until 1977 was that United Kingdom authorities decided on a total number to be produced, then allocated a proportion to each of the Commonwealth countries and Crown dependencies and possessions. The award of the medals was then at the discretion of the local government authority, who were free to decide who would be awarded a medal and why.

A total of 85,234 medals were awarded, including

- 6,500 to Australians
- 7,500 to Canadians
- 1,500 to New Zealanders

The medal was worn with other coronation and jubilee medals, immediately after campaign and polar medals, and before long service awards. Ladies could wear the medal near their left shoulder with the ribbon tied in the form of a bow.

== Description ==
- Designed by Sir William Goscombe John.
- A circular, silver medal, 1.25 inches in diameter. The obverse features the conjoined effigies of King George V and Queen Mary, crowned and robed, facing left. The legend around the top edge reads "GEORGE • V • AND • QUEEN • MARY • MAY • VI • MCMXXXV".
- The reverse displays the Royal Cypher "GRI", surmounted by an Imperial Crown. At the left is the date "MAY 6 / 1910" in two lines, and at right the date: "MAY 6 / 1935". The border is ornate.
- The purple ribbon is 1.25 inches wide, with three narrow stripes of dark blue, white, and dark blue at each edge. The three narrow stripes are 0.25 inches wide in total.
- It was awarded unnamed.

== Notable recipients ==
=== Australia ===
The following list includes some notable Australians who received the King George V Silver Jubilee Medal. It is not an exhaustive list of recipients.

- Frank Chaffey
- Lou Cunningham
- Hudson Fysh
- Irene Hall
- Eric Harrison
- Walter James
- William Dartnell Johnson
- Norbert Keenan
- William Wilson Killen
- Allan MacDonald
- Alick McCallum
- Horace Nock
- Fanny Reading
- Elizabeth Laurie Rees

=== Canada ===
The following list includes notable Canadians who received the King George V Silver Jubilee Medal, and is not an exhaustive list of recipients.

- Robert Borden
- Joseph Clarke (Canadian politician)
- Andrew Davison
- William Egbert
- Richard Gavin Reid
- William Antrobus Griesbach
- Horace Harvey
- George Hoadley (Alberta politician)
- Frederick Jamieson
- Irene Parlby
- Edith Campbell
- Alexander Cameron Rutherford
- William Simmons (politician)

=== New Zealand ===
The following list includes notable New Zealanders who received the King George V Silver Jubilee Medal, and is not an exhaustive list of recipients.

==== A ====
- Hugh Acland
- James Allen
- Stephen Allen
- John Allum
- George James Anderson
- Alfred Ansell
- Gilbert Archey
- John Archer
- Harry Atmore
- Alfred Averill
- Hugh Ayson

==== B ====
- Esther Mary Baber
- George Baildon
- William Henry Peter Barber
- Bill Barnard
- Louis Barnett
- John Barton
- Alice Basten
- Blanche Baughan
- Harold Beauchamp
- John Beanland
- Campbell Begg
- Francis Bell
- Charles Bellringer
- Horace Belshaw
- Frederick Bennett
- Carl Berendsen
- George Bertrand
- Marmaduke Bethell
- Arthur Bignell
- John Bitchener
- William Blomfield
- Tom Bloodworth
- William Bodkin
- Grafton Bothamley
- Fred Bowerbank
- John H. Boyes
- Tom Brindle
- Walter Broadfoot
- Matthew Brodie
- David Buddo
- Lindsay Buick
- Peter Buck
- Thomas Burnett

==== C ====
- Keith Caldwell
- John Callan
- Hugh Campbell
- Blanche Carnachan
- Walter Carncross
- Clyde Carr
- Charles Chapman
- Frederick Chapman
- Cecil Cherrington
- Frederick de Jersey Clere
- Cecil Clinkard
- George Clinkard
- Gordon Coates
- James Coates
- John Cobbe
- David Coleman
- Jeremiah Connolly
- James Craigie
- Samuel Crookes

==== D ====
- Berkeley Dallard
- Eliot Davis
- George Davis-Goff
- Frederick de la Mare
- Harold Dickie
- James Donald
- John Duigan

==== E ====
- Thomas Easterfield
- Ned Ellison
- Bill Endean

==== F ====
- Mark Fagan
- Norrie Falla
- Willi Fels
- Lindo Ferguson
- William Hughes Field
- James Lloyd Findlay
- Billy Fitchett
- George Forbes
- Flora Forde
- Thomas Forsyth
- John Robert Fow
- Annie Fraer
- Janet Fraser
- Peter Fraser

==== G ====
- Victor Galway
- Mac Geddes
- William Girling
- Billy Glenn
- C. F. Goldie
- Samuel Goldstein
- Henry Greenslade
- James Gunson

==== H ====
- Adam Hamilton
- John Ronald Hamilton
- Alfred Harding
- James Hargest
- Arthur Paul Harper
- Richard Hawke
- Oswald Hawken
- James Hay
- Edward Healy
- Joe Heenan
- James Hight
- Frederick Hilgendorf
- John Bird Hine
- Thomas Hislop
- Frank Hockly
- James Thomas Hogan
- Henry Holland
- Keith Holyoake
- Ted Howard
- William Hunt
- Thomas Alexander Hunter
- Thomas Anderson Hunter
- George Hutchison

==== I ====
- Lindsay Merritt Inglis
- Tracy Inglis
- Leonard Isitt (minister)
- Leonard Isitt (aviator)

==== J ====
- David Jones
- Fred Jones

==== K ====
- Truby King
- Joseph Kinsey
- Cybele Kirk
- Bert Kyle

==== L ====
- Robert Laidlaw
- Mary Lambie
- Frederic Lang
- Frank Langstone
- John A. Lee
- Joseph Linklater
- James Liston
- Henry Livingstone
- Charles Luke
- Frederick Lye
- Douglas Lysnar

==== M ====
- Lance Macey
- John MacGregor
- Clutha Mackenzie
- Charles Macmillan
- John Andrew MacPherson
- Ernest Marsden
- John Mason
- Rex Mason
- Jack Massey
- Walter William Massey
- Robert Masters
- Elizabeth McCombs
- Donald McGavin
- William McIntyre
- Robert McKeen
- Alexander McLeod
- James McLeod
- Peter McSkimming
- Ellen Melville
- Reginald Miles
- Frank Milner
- Walter Moffatt
- Richard Moore
- Alan Mulgan
- Jim Munro

==== N ====
- Jimmy Nash
- Walter Nash
- Edward Newman
- Āpirana Ngata
- Erima Northcroft
- Charles Norwood
- William Nosworthy
- Emily Nutsey

==== O ====
- James O'Brien
- Tom O'Byrne
- Walter Oliver
- John Ormond
- Thomas O'Shea
- Hubert Ostler

==== P ====
- George John Park
- Ronald Park
- Bill Parry
- George Pascoe
- George Pearce
- Geoffrey Peren
- Philip De La Perrelle
- Hugh Poland
- William Polson
- Dugald Poppelwell

==== R ====
- Alfred Ransom
- John Reed
- Vernon Reed
- Stewart Reid
- Heaton Rhodes
- Thomas William Rhodes
- Arthur Shapton Richards
- Randolph Ridling
- Frank Rolleston
- John Rolleston
- Harold Rushworth
- Andrew Hamilton Russell
- George Russell

==== S ====
- Albert Samuel
- Michael Joseph Savage
- Bill Schramm
- Tom Seddon
- Bob Semple
- Emily Siedeberg
- William Sinclair-Burgess
- George John Smith
- Stephen Smith
- Sydney George Smith
- William Walter Smith
- William Snodgrass
- Robert Speight
- Arthur Stallworthy
- Charles Statham
- Edith Statham
- William Stevenson
- William Stewart
- William Downie Stewart Jr
- Duncan Stout
- Alexander Stuart
- Bill Sullivan
- Dan Sullivan
- George Sykes

==== T ====
- Takurua Tamarau
- William Taverner
- Te Puea Hērangi
- Te Rangi Hīroa
- Hoani Te Heuheu Tūkino VI
- Taite Te Tomo
- Henry Thacker
- Algernon Thomas
- Te Hata Tipoki
- Eruera Tirikatene
- Tonga Mahuta
- Jonathan Trevethick
- George Troup

==== V ====
- Bill Veitch

==== W ====
- Fred Waite
- Vincent Ward
- Paddy Webb
- Campbell West-Watson
- James Whyte
- Thomas Wilford
- Thomas Wilkes
- Charles Wilkinson
- Kenneth Williams
- Ida Willis
- George Witty
- Ward Wohlmann
- Cecil J. Wray
- Robert Wright

==== Y ====
- Alexander Young
- Bruce Young
- W. Gray Young

=== Papua New Guinea ===
- Hubert Murray
- Henry Newton

=== South Africa ===
- Julia Solly
