= Arthur Tyndall =

New Zealand civil engineer, public servant, judge

Sir Arthur Tyndall CMG (12 April 1891 – 27 June 1979) was a notable New Zealand civil engineer, public servant and arbitration court judge. He was born in Dunedin, New Zealand, on 12 April 1891.

In the 1939 King's Birthday Honours, Tyndall was appointed a Companion of the Order of St Michael and St George. In 1953, he was awarded the Queen Elizabeth II Coronation Medal. In the 1955 Queen's Birthday Honours, he was knighted as a Knight Bachelor, in recognition of his services as a judge of the Court of Arbitration.
