= Stephen Smith (public servant) =

New Zealand public administrator

Resident Commissioner of the Cook Islands
- In office 1937–1938
- Preceded by: Hugh Ayson
- Succeeded by: Hugh Ayson

Personal details
- Born: 1887
- Died: 3 November 1948; Whanganui, New Zealand

Stephen John Smith (1887 – 3 November 1948) was a New Zealand public administrator. He served as Resident Commissioner of the Cook Islands from 1937 until 1938.

== Biography ==
Born in 1887, Smith entered the New Zealand civil service as a young man. During World War I he was part of the New Zealand-led occupation of Western Samoa, where he rose to the position of secretary to the military governor. After returning to New Zealand, he was deputy head of the Department of External Affairs.

Smith subsequently became Secretary of the Cook Islands Department in New Zealand in 1928. He was awarded the King George V Silver Jubilee Medal in 1935, and was appointed as Resident Commissioner of the Cook Islands in 1937. However, the following year he was replaced by his predecessor Hugh Fraser Ayson and returned to New Zealand. He retired from public service shortly afterwards.

He died in Whanganui in November 1948.
