= Ida Willis =

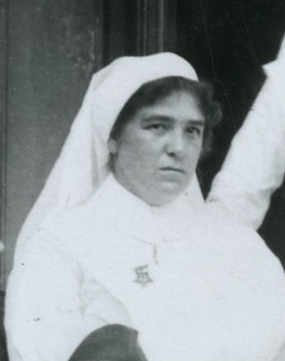
- Born: 29 December 1881; Wellington, New Zealand
- Died: 7 March 1968; Raumati Beach, New Zealand
- Military career
- Allegiance: New Zealand
- Branch: New Zealand Military Forces
- Service years: 1914–1946
- Rank: Matron-in-Chief
- Commands: New Zealand Army Nursing Service (1933–46)
- Conflicts: First World War; Second World War
- Awards: Officer of the Order of the British Empire; Associate Royal Red Cross; Mentioned in Despatches (2)

Lizzie Ida Grace Willis OBE ARRC ED (29 December 1881 – 7 March 1968) was a notable New Zealand civilian and military nurse, hospital inspector, matron, army nursing administrator. She was part of the New Zealand Army Nursing Service Corps and the Samoan Expeditionary Forces in 1914.

Willis was born in Wellington, New Zealand, in 1881 to mother Amelia Annie Nicolson and father Alexander James Willis. She attended Johnsonville School, Fitzherbert Terrace School and Wellington Girl's High School. Willis trained as a nurse at Wellington Hospital from 1907 to 1910.

== Nursing career ==
In August 1914, Willia was one of six nurses who went with the expeditionary force that took over German Samoa. Willis was holidaying in Fiji when World War I broke out, leaving herself and friends stranded for three weeks. She joined the group on 26 August and embarked the next morning.

In July 1915, Willis was one of a group of sixty-nine onboard the hospital ship, Maheno, bound for Egypt. Once in Cairo, she worked at The New Zealand General Hospital, taking care of soldiers wounded and ill from the Gallipoli Campaign. She was transferred to the No 1 New Zealand General Hospital in Brockenhurst in June 1916 where she worked for a short period.

Willis arrived in France on 30 July 1916 to work at the First New Zealand Stationary Hospital at Amiens, just 15 miles from the front-line. Conditions where noted to have been extremely difficult, a quote from Willis describes:

A large ward of 80 beds took more than its number of stretcher cases, and here Doctors, Nurses, Orderlies and Padres worked hard in the sorting of them, removing mud and filthy garments from those poor fellow who had come straight from the mud filled trenches. We washed and fed them, while next door, in the huge operating theatre containing three tables, Surgeons, Assistants, Sisters and orderlies carried on for periods of up to 24 to 26 hours pausing only for meals and coffee. Sometimes because of the pressure of work, the theatre staff had no change of garments during 6 to 8 operations, stopping only to plunge their gloved hands under running water and disinfectant.

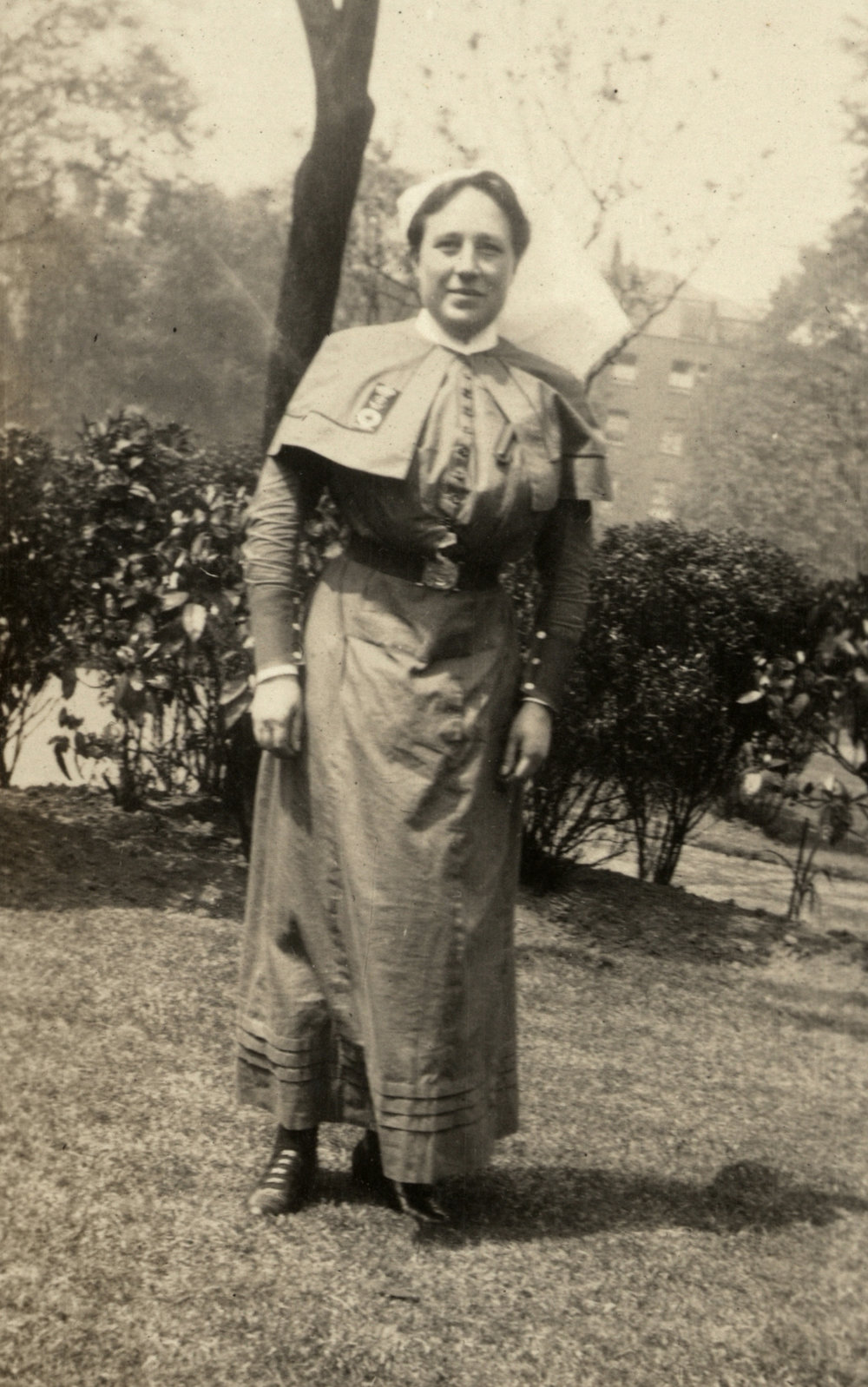
Nurse Ida Willis in France. 1916.

In August 1917, Willis and the New Zealand Stationary Hospital moved to Hazebrouck. After the First World War, Willis moved back to New Zealand and worked at the Featherston Military Camp. In 1919, Willis was appointed assistant to the matron in chief of the New Zealand Army Nursing Services, Hester Maclean. She went on to administrative work, as assistant of public hospital while continuing her work with NZANS, being appointed principal nurse and then matron in chief. At the outbreak of World War II, Willis organised the Nursing Corps.

=== Awards ===
In the 1918 New Year Honours, Willis was appointed an Associate of the Royal Red Cross. In 1935, she was awarded the King George V Silver Jubilee Medal. She was appointed an Officer of the Order of the British Empire (Military Division) in the 1944 New Year Honours, in recognition of her service as matron-in-chief of the New Zealand Army Nursing Service. Willis was noted as the first women in New Zealand to receive an O.B.E.

== Personal life ==
Willis retired in February 1946, and lived at Raumati Beach with her sister. She never married and traveled with her family during her 22 year retirement. Ida Willis died on 7 March 1968, she is buried at the Karori Cemetery, Wellington.
