= Te Hata Tīpoki =

Te Hata Tīpoki (1880–1940) was a notable New Zealand tribal leader and land rights activist. Of Māori descent, he identified with the Ngāti Kahungunu iwi. He was born in Waihirere, Hawke's Bay, New Zealand in 1880.

In 1935, he was awarded the King George V Silver Jubilee Medal.
