= 1955 New Year Honours (New Zealand) =

Annual awards for New Zealanders

The 1955 New Year Honours in New Zealand were appointments by Elizabeth II on the advice of the New Zealand government to various orders and honours to reward and highlight good works by New Zealanders. The awards celebrated the passing of 1954 and the beginning of 1955, and were announced on 1 January 1955.

The recipients of honours are displayed here as they were styled before their new honour.

== Knight Bachelor ==
- The Honourable George Panton Finlay – senior puisne judge of the Supreme Court.
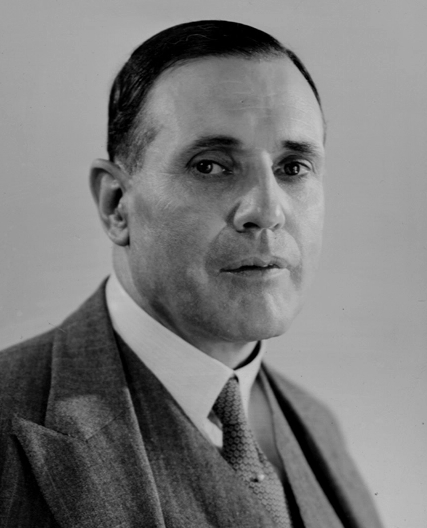
Sir George Finlay

== Order of Saint Michael and Saint George ==
=== Knight Commander (KCMG) ===
- Leslie Knox Munro – ambassador to the United States of America.

== Order of the British Empire ==
=== Knight Commander (KBE) ===
Civil division

- Major-General William Henry Cunningham CBE DSO VD – crown prosecutor in Wellington. For services to law.
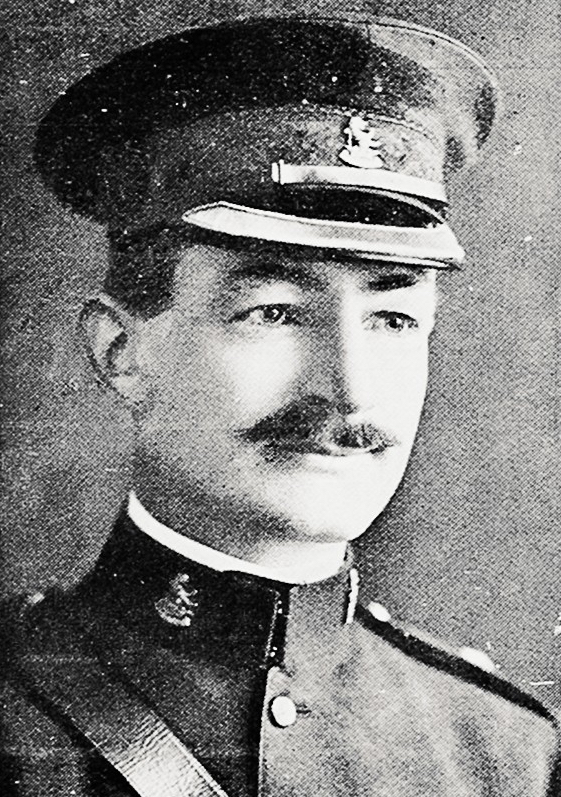
William Cunningham

=== Commander (CBE) ===
Civil division

- Ernest Hedley Roy Green – chief engineer, Post and Telegraph Department.
- Robert Alexander Crookston Laidlaw MBE – of Auckland. For social welfare and philanthropic services.
- Stanley Logan Paterson – senior stipendiary magistrate.

Military division

- Captain Frank Edward Taylor DSC VRD – Royal New Zealand Naval Volunteer Reserve.
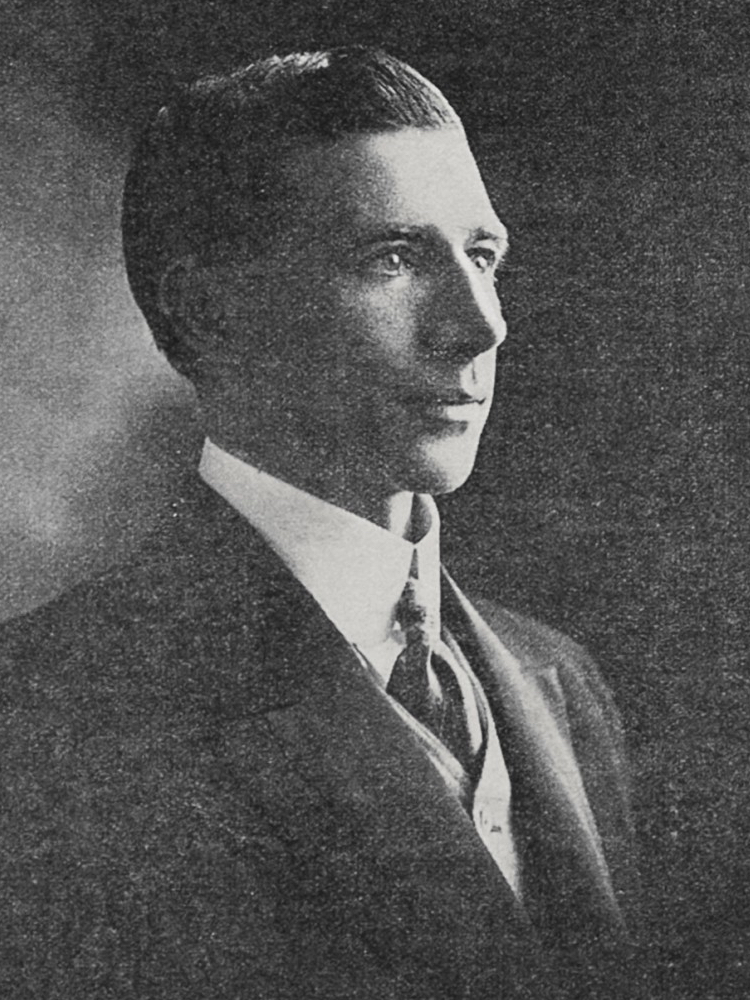
Robert Laidlaw

=== Officer (OBE) ===
Civil division

- William David Campbell – of Timaru. For services to law, education and journalism.
- Mason Te Rama Apakura Durie – leading chief of the Rangitāne tribe. For services to the Māori people.
- Frank William Gilligan – headmaster of the Wanganui Collegiate School. For services to education.
- Charles Kirkpatrick Grierson – president of the New Zealand Institute of Surveyors.
- Marie Emerentia Little – matron of the Sunnyside Mental Hospital, Christchurch.
- John Murray JP – of Wellington. For patriotic and social welfare services, particularly in connection with the Disabled Servicemen's Rehabilitation League.
- George John Park – of Auckland. For services to education, and in connection with the work of the Crippled Children's Society.
- Arthur Gentry Pitts LRCP FRCS – a medical practitioner at Waimate. For services to the community.
- Henry Charles Withell – of Ashburton. For services to local government.

Military division

- Acting Commander John David Keay VRD – Royal New Zealand Navy.
- Lieutenant-Colonel William Denzil Philp DSO ED – Royal New Zealand Artillery, Territorial Force.
- Squadron Leader Cecil David Melville Kingsford – Royal New Zealand Air Force.

=== Member (MBE) ===
Civil division

- Susan Amy Barnicoat – of Wellington. For services to the community, especially in connection with women's organisations.
- John Bruorton – of Christchurch. For social welfare services.
- Jenny Henderson Campbell – of Auckland. For social welfare services.
- Avalin Sutherland Carran JP – commissioner of the Warkworth Town Board. For services to the community.
- John Ira Fraser. For services to local government in the Maniototo County.
- Sidney George – of Auckland. For services to the Boys' Brigade.
- Albert Percy Greenfield JP – of Dunedin. For social welfare services.
- Edgar Harding – of Woodville. For services to the community, especially in connection with local government and the dairy industry.
- James David Howitt – chairman of the management committee of the Wellington Boys' Institute.
- Frederick Hainsworth Hudson JP – of Levin. For services to local government.
- Maud Marian Kelly – of Nelson. For social welfare services.
- Thomas Daniel Lennie – of Christchurch. For services to horticulture.
- Ema Te Toroa Tangiariki Otene. For services to the Māori people in Hawke's Bay, especially in the field of women's welfare.
- Arthur Henry Sivewright – chairman of the Hawke's Bay Education Board.
- Henry Joseph Stage. For services to local government and to agriculture in Marlborough.
- William Stapleton – curator of the botanical gardens in Invercargill. For services to horticulture.
- Henry Sweney JP – of Christchurch. For social welfare services.
- Mabel Sinclair Walden – of Riverton. For social welfare services.
- Constance Lilian Weston. For services to the community in New Plymouth.
- Ernest Summers Wilson – of Dunedin. For services to the community in connection with charitable and patriotic organisations.

Military division

- Lieutenant Arthur Beevor Wilkinson – Royal New Zealand Navy.
- The Reverend Francis John Green – chaplain (third class), Royal New Zealand Chaplains Department.
- Major Leslie Rexnold Musgrave – New Zealand Regiment.
- Captain (temporary) Hugh Bannatyne Fraser-Tytler – Royal New Zealand Infantry, Territorial Force.
- Warrant Officer Class I (temporary) Carl Alexander Walter – Royal New Zealand Electrical and Mechanical Engineers.
- Flight Lieutenant Noel Alexander Spring-Rice – Royal New Zealand Air Force.
- Warrant Officer Leslie William Thompson – Royal New Zealand Air Force.
- Warrant Officer Clifford Huia Perrett – Royal New Zealand Air Force.

== British Empire Medal (BEM) ==
Military division

- Petty Officer Edward Maurice Hancock – Royal New Zealand Navy.
- Chief Engine Room Artificer James Nathan Rothwell – Royal New Zealand Navy.
- Chief Petty Officer Mervyn Leslie St. Clare – Royal New Zealand Navy.
- Chief Petty Officer Claude Wilfred Mason-Riseborough – Royal New Zealand Navy.
- Staff-Sergeant Joseph Matthew Lowe – Royal New Zealand Signals, Territorial Force.
- Flight Sergeant James Hugh Watts – Royal New Zealand Air Force.
- Flight Sergeant William Harrison Staniland – Royal New Zealand Air Force.

== Air Force Cross (AFC) ==
- Flight Lieutenant Raymond Arthur Mackinder – Royal New Zealand Air Force.

== Air Force Medal (AFM) ==
- Sergeant Ivan Noel Moran – Royal New Zealand Air Force.
