= Mary Agnes Canty =

Mary Agnes Canty (born Lucy Bridget Canty; 22 March 1879 – 6 October 1950) was a New Zealand Roman Catholic nun, teacher, and nursing school matron at the Mater Misericordiae Hospital in Auckland.

Canty was born in Greta, New South Wales, Australia on 22 March 1879. She joined the Sisters of Mercy order in Auckland when she was 16 and after training as a teacher she was sent with Sister Mary Gonzaga Leahy to study nursing in Sydney. The two returned to New Zealand to nurse at the Coromandel Hospital before finishing their nursing registration back in Sydney. In 1902 when Gonzaga became matron of the Mater Misericordiae Hospital Canty was her deputy. The two women were the driving forces behind much of the hospital's growth and development.

In 1929 when new hospital facilities and services were planned Canty joined Gonzaga on a three month tour of the United States where they studied up-to-date hospitals bringing back their findings to contribute to the new building's plans.

Canty became a tutor and head of the Mater's nursing school which opened in 1937. To run the nursing school Canty was required to be qualified in both general and maternity nursing so she gained her maternity registration at St Helens Hospital in Wellington.

Canty was known to be strict but compassionate. She died in Auckland on 6 October 1950.
