= Hugh Ayson =

New Zealand lawyer, judge and public administrator

Hugh Ayson CMG
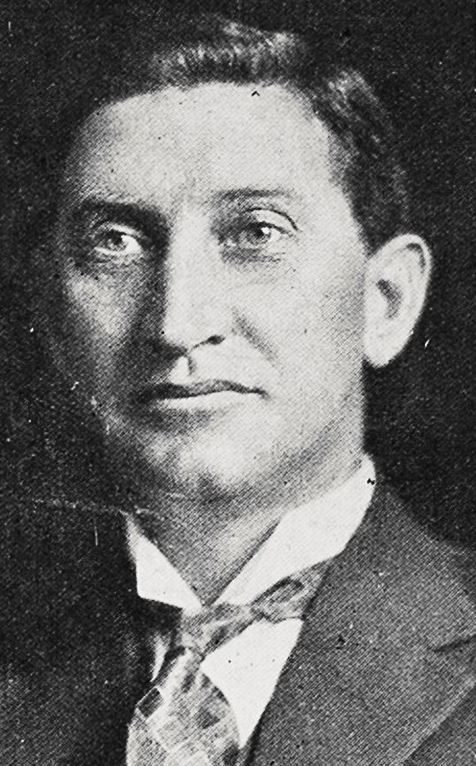

Resident Commissioner of the Cook Islands
- In office 1923–1937
- Preceded by: John George Lewis Hewitt
- Succeeded by: Stephen Smith
- In office 1938–1943
- Preceded by: Stephen Smith
- Succeeded by: William Tailby

Personal details
- Born: 16 November 1884; Toiro, New Zealand
- Died: 1 February 1948 (aged 63); Days Bay, New Zealand

Hugh Fraser Ayson CMG (16 November 1884 – 1 February 1948) was a New Zealand lawyer, judge, and public administrator. He was Resident Commissioner of the Cook Islands for two spells between 1923 and 1943.

== Biography ==
Ayson was born in Toiro, near Balclutha in South Otago, New Zealand on 16 November 1884. He was educated in Wairarapa, before attending Victoria University College. He started work as a lawyer in 1905, becoming a partner in Bunny and Ayson.

In 1916, Ayson was appointed a judge in the Native Land Court and the High Court of the Cook Islands at Rarotonga, also serving as Deputy Resident Commissioner to the islands. In 1918 he returned to New Zealand to become a judge in the Native Land Court in Rotorua.

Ayson then returned to the Cook Islands to become Resident Commissioner of the Cook Islands from 1923 to 1937. He was succeeded by Stephen Smith, but returned to replace Smith the following year, going on to serve until 1943.

Ayson was appointed a Companion of the Order of St Michael and St George (CMG) in the 1929 New Year Honours, and in 1935 he was awarded the King George V Silver Jubilee Medal.
