= Blanche Carnachan =

New Zealand educationalist, community worker

Blanche Eleanor Carnachan MBE JP (23 November 1871 – 22 March 1954) was a New Zealand teacher, educationalist and community worker. She was born in Cambridge, New Zealand, on 23 November 1871.

In 1935, she was awarded the King George V Silver Jubilee Medal. In the 1939 King's Birthday Honours, Carnachan was appointed a Member of the Order of the British Empire, for social welfare services.
