= Allevia Hospital Epsom =

Hospital in Auckland, New Zealand

Geography
- Location: Mountain Road, Auckland, New Zealand
- Coordinates: 36.873599986102505°S 174.77014621534127°E

History
- Opened: 1900

Links
- Lists: Hospitals in New Zealand

Allevia Hospital Epsom is a private hospital in Mountain Road, Auckland, New Zealand. The hospital was founded by the Sisters of Mercy in 1900 and called the Mater Misericordiae Hospital. The Mater treated patients regardless of religious affiliation and took both private and public patients. In 1988 it changed its name to Mercy Hospital in line with other hospitals run by the Order of Mercy. The Ascot Integrated Hospitals took over surgical services at Mercy in 2001. The hospital was renamed Allevia Hospital Epsom in 2025.

== Mater Misericordiae Hospital ==
The origins of the Mater go back to 1831 in Ireland with the founding of the Order of Mercy by Catherine McAuley and the Order's first hospital, the Mater Misericordiae Hospital in Dublin. The Order arrived in New Zealand in 1850 and the Sisters began their nursing work in Coromandel in 1896 when they took charge of the public hospital.

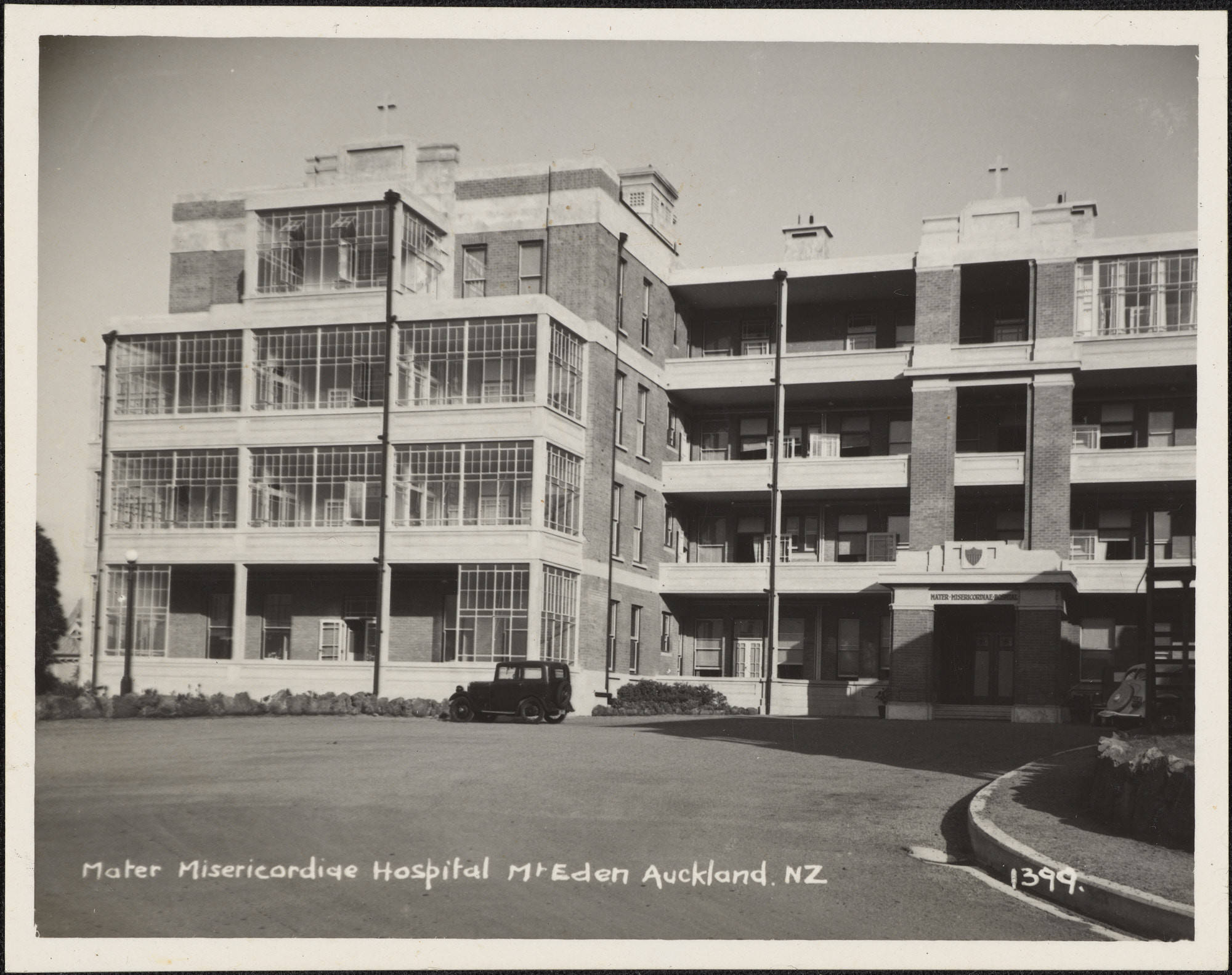
Mater Hospital in the 1930s

The Order received a legacy which enabled them to establish the Mater Misericordiae Hospital. They purchased Harewood House, a property in Mountain Rd, Auckland from Mr P. Dignan for £2800. Harewood House, which was originally built for Thomas McFarlane in 1868, was converted to a 19 bed hospital. It opened on 12 December 1900, the Sisters of Mercy Foundation Day. The house, called St Catherine's, was used for a variety of purposes over the years before being demolished in 1981. In the first year 34 admissions were made and that number increased to 117 by 1904. The hospital was financed from modest patient fees and fundraising as hospital care at that time was not free.

Three sisters from the Order initially staffed the hospital and were joined in 1902 by Mother Mary Gonzaga Leahy and Mother Mary Agnes Canty. Gonzaga had been matron of the Coromandel hospital until 1902 becoming matron of the Mater after she had completed further training at St Vincent's in Sydney. She was known as 'a stern but extremely able administrator', 'a woman of vision' with a formidable reputation. She also raised finances for the hospital from the Catholic and the wider community. Gonzaga and Agnes planned to develop the Mater as a major surgical hospital and the two were responsible for the hospital's growth and development for its first 50 years.

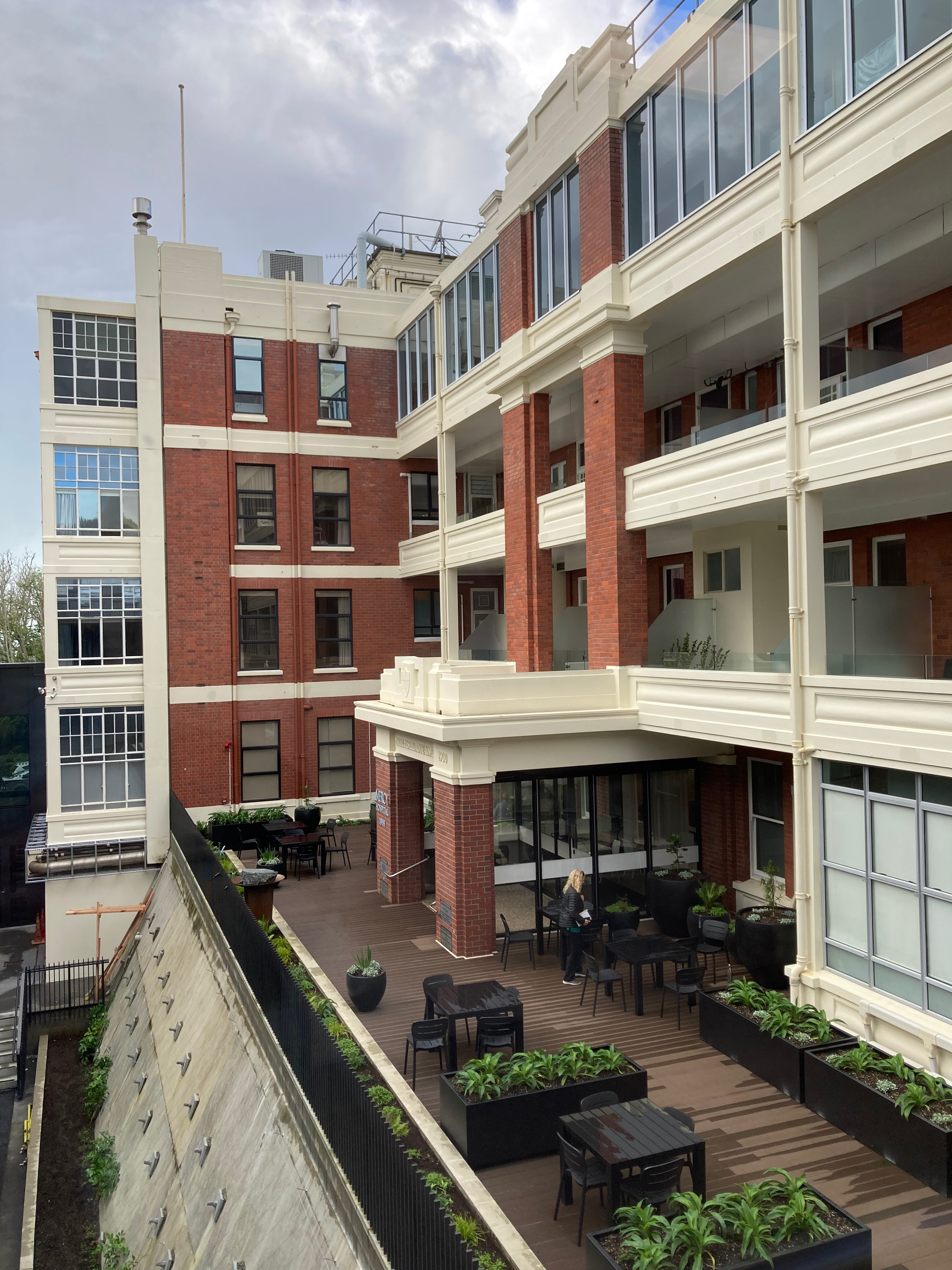
Old entrance to the 1936 block, 2025

In 1918 a two storey brick building called Stella Maris, with up-to-date hospital and surgical facilities, was opened. Future expansion was planned with the aim of offering care to those who could not afford to pay fees. In 1925, the year of the hospital's silver jubilee, an adjoining property of several acres which included a house 'Kiwi', which was to be used as a convent, was purchased from Mr Dignan giving scope for further expansion. The foundation stone for a new building was laid in 1928 but construction was delayed while Gonzaga and Agnes went to the United States in 1929 to study the latest trends in hospital facilities. They subsequently worked on the design with the architect Daniel Paterson. After three years of construction the new main block, as well as a separate block St Roch's for patients with infectious diseases, opened in 1936. St Roch's closed in 1952 as the incidence of infectious diseases had declined and the demand for care greatly reduced.

Although the hospital was Catholic it accepted patients of all denominations. In 1960–1961 4,100 patients were treated in the hospital and ca. 64% of those were non-Catholic. The hospital operated private and public wards. Honorary medical and surgical staff gave their services free in the public wards. Student nurses from the Nurses' Training School provided care in the public wards supervised by the Sisters. No fees were charged in the public wards and Mary Agnes Ward. The private wards were staffed by the Sisters and registered staff nurses. In 1961 there were 40 beds in the public wards and 39 in the Mary Agnes Ward.

=== Nursing training ===
In 1937 a Nurses' Training School opened and a nurses' home on Almorah Rd opened in 1938. This was the culmination of years of work needed to get approval and a law change to allow nursing training to be done in private hospitals. As the nursing school matron was required to have nursing registration and a maternity nursing qualification Agnes and another sister completed maternity training at St Helen's Hospital in Wellington. The Training School enabled training in New Zealand for Sisters of the Order who were not allowed to train at a public hospital. There were 22 students in the first year of whom four belonged to the Order. The students worked over three shifts attending lectures by Gonzaga and medical staff several times a week when not on ward duties. They were subject to strict uniform rules and timetables and had little free time. During the 1950s and '60s the number of students increased with the 1958 intake the largest class at 45 students. The nursing school closed in May 1973 as the Sisters of Mercy recognised that training in a small hospital would not meet the developments in nursing education which demanded broader education in biological and social sciences and experience in a greater variety of settings.

=== Maternity and hospice care ===
Two services opened in 1952: a seven bed maternity unit in the former infectious diseases block to meet demand for maternity care and the Mary Agnes Ward, in a separate house on Gilgit Road. The Mary Agnes Ward was a 13 bed ward for the care of the dying and those with incurable illness. The ward was not called a hospice as the term was not readily accepted at that time. The Mary Agnes Ward expanded to 39 beds in 1959 with the focus on care of the terminally ill rather than geriatric patients.

In 1962 a new 46 bed maternity hospital, partially funded by public fundraising, opened to meet demand. The maternity unit closed in 1979 due to financial pressure of providing the service. Its closure met with strong public opposition from those who supported the option of women having a private maternity hospital. After the closure of the maternity block the geriatric patients in the Mary Agnes Ward moved to a geriatric unit in the former maternity block where the service aimed to care for the whole patient.

With the closure of the maternity service the hospital could put added emphasis on its care of the dying basing it on the model of St Christopher's Hospice in London and other English hospices. The St Josephs Mercy Hospice opened in 1979. As well as providing for holistic care for the dying the service promoted the concept of palliative care to health professionals and the public. In 2007 the hospice moved to a redeveloped St Mary's College hostel building on College Hill in Ponsonby and was renamed Mercy Hospice.

=== Surgical services ===
Gonzaga's vision for the hospital to provide leading surgical services began in the 1930s with thyroid surgery performed by Carrick Robertson, who became the hospital's medical superintendent.

Further rebuilding and upgrading occurred from the 1960s to the 1980s to improve and introduce new specialist services and hospital and surgical facilities including a cardio-thoracic unit and Intensive Care Unit. The cardio-thoracic unit was led by leading heart surgeon Brian Barratt-Boyes who wanted to provide open heart surgery for overseas patients in addition to his practice at Green Lane Hospital. The Mater's nursing staff trained alongside the Green Lane surgical team. Funding for the unit was provided by philanthropist Sir William Stevenson. Private and public general surgical services were expanded by the surgeon Kevin McNamara.

=== Other services ===
Over the years the Mater established other outreach services such as a Home Nursing Service in 1957 which was subsidised by the government. In 1973 the Catherine McAuley Health Centre opened at 'Cairnhill', 95 Mountain Rd. The Centre provided primary healthcare linking with the hospital's other services such as pharmacy, x-ray and laboratory, surgical and medical facilities as well as providing preventive health care and health education. Run by Dr Whitney Otway the Centre was sold to him in 1978 and continued to operate as the Cairnhill Health Centre.

== Notable staff ==
=== Medical superintendents ===
- Carrick Robertson, 1937-1953
- Edward Cronin, 1953-1964
- Basil Quin, 1964-1973
- Kevin McNamara, 1973-1977
- John C Gillman, 1978-1981
- Walter Tongue, 1982-1985
- Alan Cameron, 1986-1989
- Liam Wright, 1990-1999

=== Matrons ===
- Mother Mary Gonzaga Leahy, matron of the Mater Hospital, 1902-1950
- Mother Mary Agnes Canty, matron of the Mater Training School, 1937-1950
- Sister de Montford (Hook), matron and principal nurse, 1964-1980

== Mercy Hospital ==
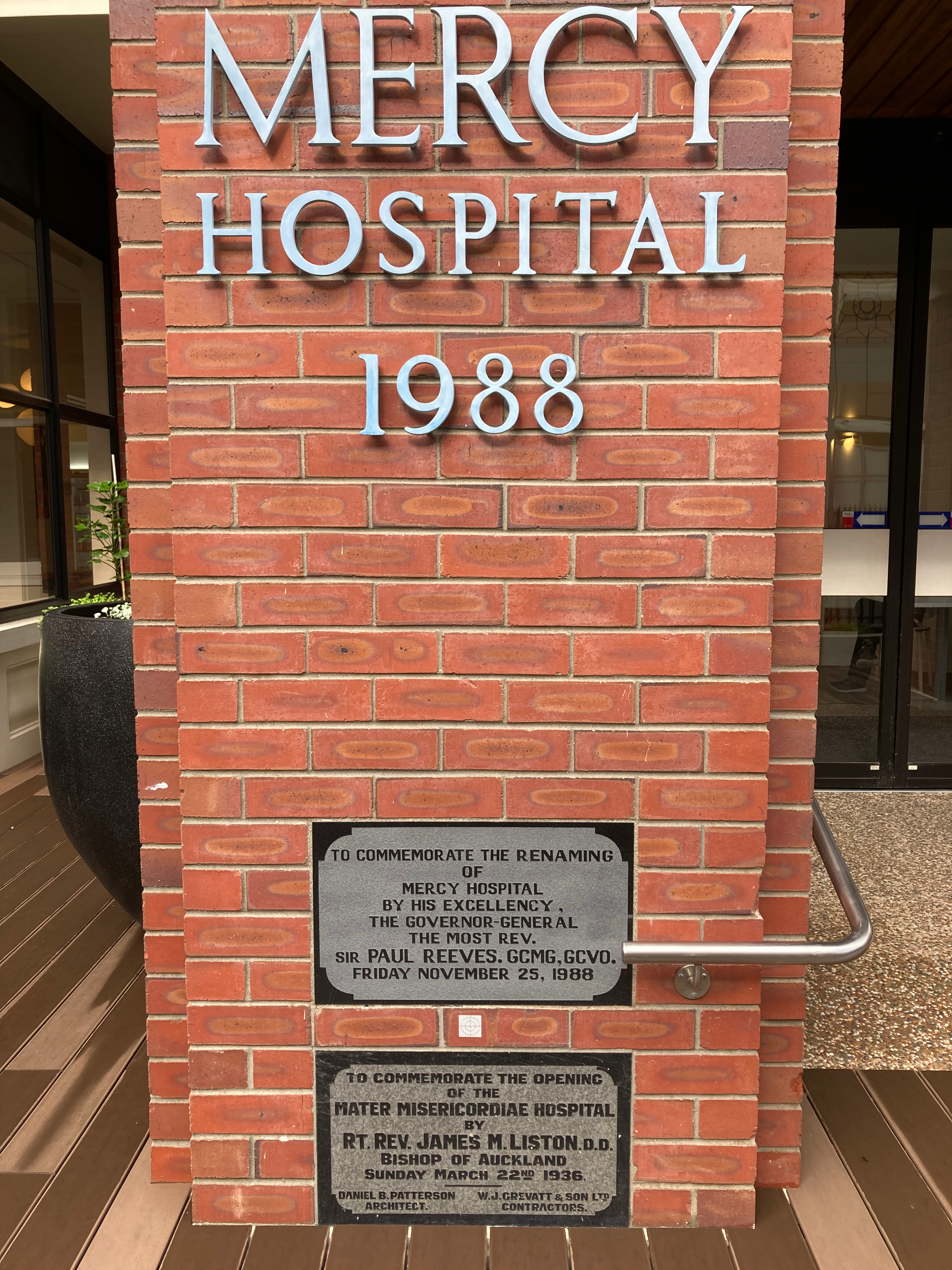

The Mater weathered financial crises in the 1970s. In 1988 it changed its name to Mercy Hospital as the name Mater Misericordiae no longer had the same meaning to the general public who found it difficult to spell and frequently called the hospital 'The Martyr'. The Sisters of Mercy hospitals worldwide had rebranded as Mercy hospitals and the name put the hospital in line with other Mercy hospitals in Whangārei, Palmerston North and Dunedin. In 1989 the hospital received accreditation as a private hospital. In 1993 it was incorporated as a separate company owned by the Order which allowed a more appropriate governance structure especially as the Order itself was declining and the number of lay staff was increasing.

In 2001 the Ascot Integrated Hospital took over the surgical services at hospital from the Sisters of Mercy allowing the Order to focus their care on aged and terminally ill.

== Allevia Hospital Epsom ==
In 2025 Mercy was renamed Allevia Hospital Epsom with expanded facilities making it the biggest private hospital in New Zealand.
