= Henley McKegg =

New Zealand-born Cook Islands politician (1921–1961)

European Member of the Legislative Council
- In office 1953–1958
- Preceded by: Willie Watson
- Succeeded by: Frank Bateson

Personal details
- Born: 6 December 1921; Auckland, New Zealand
- Died: 10 October 1961 (aged 39); Rarotonga, Cook Islands

Henley Robert McKegg (6 December 1921 – 10 October 1961) was a New Zealand-born Cook Islands politician. He served as a member of the Legislative Council between 1953 and 1958.

== Biography ==
McKegg was born in Auckland in 1921. After working as a bank clerk, he joined the Royal New Zealand Air Force in November 1941 and served as a flight lieutenant in Europe during World War II, winning the Distinguished Flying Cross. Following the war he returned to the Cook Islands, becoming involved in his family's business.

In 1953 McKegg contested the elections for the European seat on Rarotonga Island Council and the Legislative Council, defeating the incumbent Willie Watson. He was re-elected in the 1956 elections, winning by just three votes. He did not stand in the 1958 elections.

McKegg moved to New Zealand in 1961, but died during a return visit to the Cook Islands on 10 October the same year.
