= William Benham (zoologist) =

New Zealand zoologist (1860–1950)

Sir William Benham KBE FRS
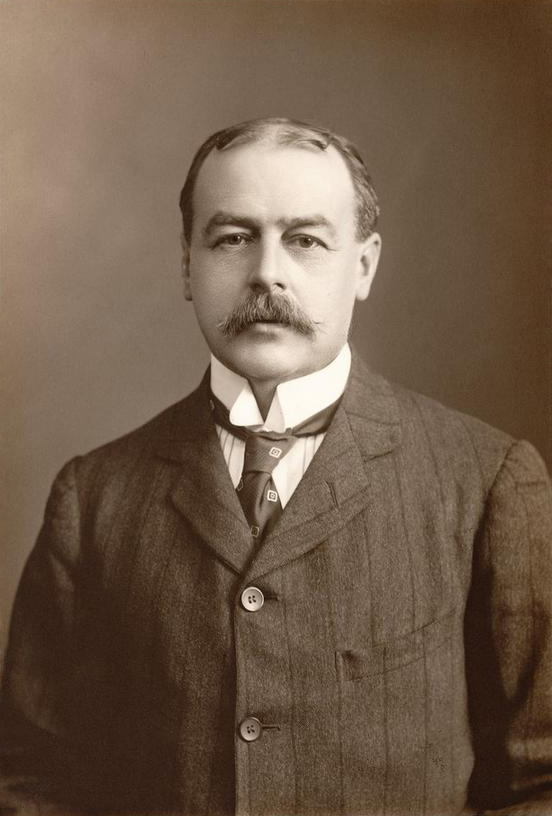
- Benham in 1907
- Born: William Blaxland Benham; 29 March 1860; Isleworth, Middlesex, England
- Died: 21 August 1950 (aged 90); Dunedin, New Zealand
- Spouse: Beatrice Eadie (m. 1889; died 1909)
- Scientific career
- Fields: Zoology
- Institutions: Bedford College, London; University of Otago; Otago Museum

Sir William Blaxland Benham KBE FRS (29 March 1860 – 21 August 1950) was a New Zealand zoologist.

== Biography ==
He was born in Isleworth, Middlesex, England, on 29 March 1860. He studied at Marlborough College and London University and taught at Bedford College, London (now part of Royal Holloway, University of London) before moving to New Zealand in 1898. He was a member of the 1907 Sub-Antarctic Islands Scientific Expedition. From 1905 to 1911 he was the Governor in Council of the Board of Governors of the New Zealand Institute.

Benham was professor of biology at the University of Otago from 1898 until he retired and was given the title of professor emeritus in 1937. In 1937, he was awarded the King George VI Coronation Medal, and he was appointed a Knight Commander of the Order of the British Empire in the 1939 King's Birthday Honours. He won the Hutton Medal of the New Zealand Institute in 1911, and the Hector Medal in 1935. In 1942, he was awarded an honorary Doctor of Science degree by the University of New Zealand.

Benham died in Dunedin on 21 August 1950, and his ashes were buried in Dunedin Northern Cemetery.

== Selected publications ==
- Harmer, S. F.; Shipley, A. E., eds. (1896). ""Archiannelida, Polychaeta, and Myzostomaria" by W. Blaxland Benham". The Cambridge Nature History, Vol. II. pp. 241–346.
- Benham, W. Blaxland (1901). Lankester, Ray (ed.). Part IV. The Platyhelmia, Mesozoa and Nemertini. A Treatise on Zoology. Adam and Charles Black.
