= 1939 Birthday Honours (New Zealand) =

Awards list for New Zealand

The 1939 King's Birthday Honours in New Zealand, celebrating the official birthday of King George VI, were appointments made by the King to various orders and honours to reward and highlight good works by New Zealanders. They were announced on 7 June 1939.

The recipients of honours are displayed here as they were styled before their new honour.

== Order of Saint Michael and Saint George ==
=== Companion (CMG) ===
- Henry Tai Mitchell – of Rotorua. For devoted services on the behalf of native races.
- Arthur Tyndall AMICE – under-secretary of the Mines Department and director of Housing Construction, Wellington

== Order of the British Empire ==
=== Knight Commander (KBE) ===
Civil division

- William Blaxland Benham DSc MA FRS – emeritus professor of biology, University of Otago.
- Thomas Alexander Hunter MSc MA – professor of philosophy and psychology, Victoria College, University of New Zealand.
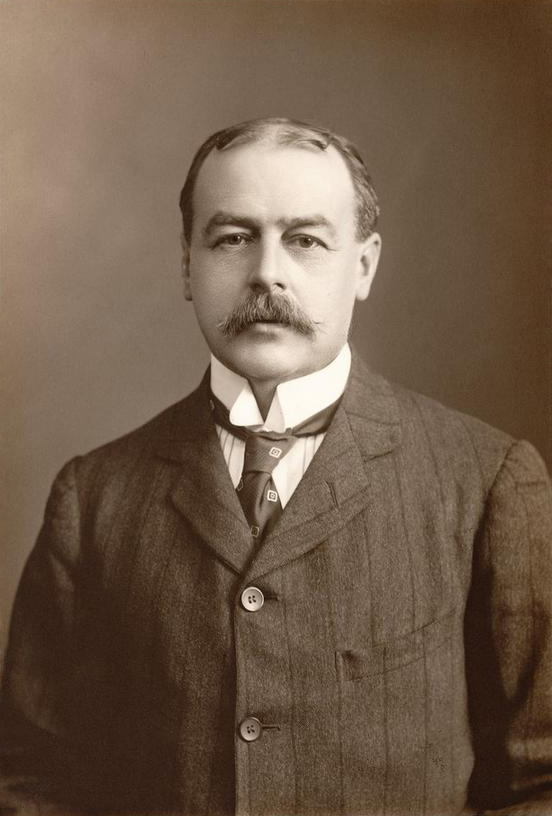
Sir William Benham

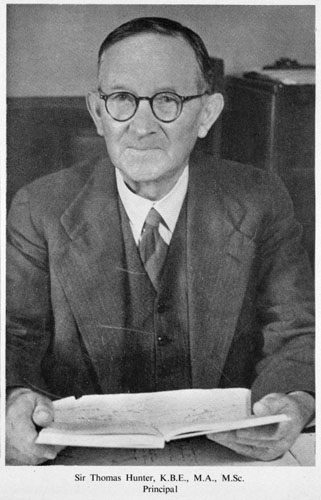
Sir Thomas Hunter

=== Commander (CBE) ===
Civil division

- Norman Edwin Hutchings – assistant under-secretary, Public Works Department, Wellington.

=== Officer (OBE) ===
Civil division

- Jane Rhoda Barr MA – of Wellington; formerly principal of Timaru Girls' High School.
- Mother Mary Gonzaga – matron of the Mater Misericordiae Hospital, Auckland.
- Colonel William Douthwaite Holgate – of Auckland. For public services.

Military division

- Flight Lieutenant Cyril Eyton Kay – Royal New Zealand Air Force; of Auckland.

=== Member (MBE) ===
Civil division

- Teresa Butler – matron of the hospital at Rarotonga, Cook Islands.
- Mary Blythe Law – formerly a teacher at the Institute for the Blind, Auckland.
- Blanche Eleanor Carnachan JP – of Auckland. For social welfare services.
- Frank Reed – of Auckland; formerly chief inspector of mines, Mines Department.

Military division

- Commissioned Engineer Albert John Lee – Royal Navy; of Auckland.
- Captain David Nicol – New Zealand Army Ordnance Corps; district ordnance officer, southern military district, Christchurch.
