= Robert Laidlaw =

New Zealand businessman (1885–1971)

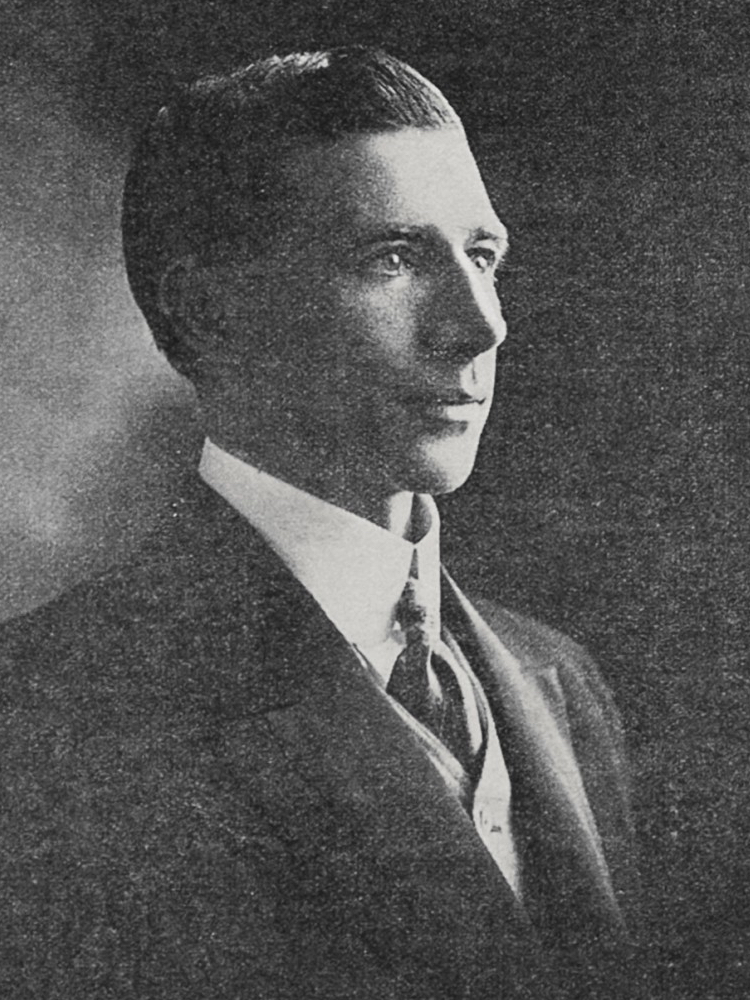
Laidlaw in 1913

Robert Alexander Crookston Laidlaw CBE (8 September 1885 – 12 March 1971) was a New Zealand businessman who founded the Farmers Trading Company, one of the largest department store chains in New Zealand. He was also a Christian writer and philanthropist and a well-known lay preacher in the Open Brethren movement.

== Biography ==
Laidlaw was born in Scotland. His parents emigrated to Dunedin, New Zealand, when he was a young boy. He studied at Otago Boys' High School. In Auckland he founded Laidlaw Leeds, a Sears-type mail order catalogue for rural customers. This later merged with the older Farmers Union Trading Company to become what is now Farmers Trading Company Ltd, the last remaining nationwide chain of department stores in the country.

He married Lillian Watson, the sister of American preacher Henry Ironside, in 1915, and the couple settled in New Zealand. They were to have three children, including notable architect Lillian (later Lillian Chrystall) and toy-maker Lincoln Laidlaw.

One of Laidlaw's best-known quotes is about the practice of tithing:

From the earliest stage of my business, I tithed and received God's blessing and wisdom. But, at the same time I knew from the parable of the seeds that the Lord wishes our crop to be bountiful so it blesses him but it is a sin to harvest the crop too early, so initially my tithes were small and gifts of love and I felt God's blessing on my work. Later, when my business was a success my tithes were bountiful and I was blessed again.

He wrote the short book, The Reason Why, which has over 50 million copies in print.

In 2008, the Bible College of New Zealand renamed itself Laidlaw College in recognition of his role as one of the College's founders, and because of "his significant influence in both society and church".

In 1935, Laidlaw was awarded the King George V Silver Jubilee Medal, and in 1953 he received the Queen Elizabeth II Coronation Medal. In the 1955 New Year Honours, he was appointed a Commander of the Order of the British Empire, for social welfare and philanthropic services. In 2000, Laidlaw was posthumously inducted into the New Zealand Business Hall of Fame.

== Postal Sunday School Movement ==
Robert Laidlaw founded the PSSM Bible Discovery trust in 1938 with Mr. James Rowan. Mr. Laidlaw and Mr. Rowan originally started their operations separately but within 6 months of launching learned of the other and so merged their two operations.

PSSM was founded on the idea of the mail order catalogue, something that Laidlaw had successfully used to gather customers in the rural farming areas of New Zealand for his company Farmers Trading Company. Laidlaw used the mail order catalogue system to send 'Sunday school' lessons to children in these rural areas, thus creating the "Postal Sunday School Movement." This continued via post until 2011 when it was transferred to an email based system. At its peak, there were 9,000 subscribers in New Zealand and another 3,000 overseas. Countries served include Nigeria, Papua New Guinea, Fiji, and Samoa.

In 2010 the PSSM Trust board decided that after declining rolls and lack of engagement, they needed to strategically reinvent their presence, becoming 2ndcity Studios.
