= Park Seed Company =

American mail order seed company

- Industry: Mail-Order Gardening
- Founded: 1868 Libonia, Pennsylvania USA
- Headquarters: Greenwood, South Carolina, USA
- Products: Seeds, plants, garden art, and accessories
- Website: parkseed.com

Park Seed Company is an American mail-order and eCommerce seed company based in Greenwood, South Carolina founded in 1868. Park Seed specializes in garden seeds, offering more than 1,100 varieties of flower, vegetable, and herb seeds, plus a large selection of bulbs, live plants, and gardening accessories. Park Seed Company distributes millions of catalogs every year and maintains an online retail presence. Park Seed is a division of Jackson & Perkins Park Acquisitions, which is a subsidiary of publicly traded Western Capital Resources.

== History ==
Park Seed Company got its start in 1868 when 15-year-old George Watt Park decided to sell seeds he had harvested from his backyard garden in Libonia, Pennsylvania. Park bought a hand press and printed a list of the seeds that he wanted to sell. In addition to circulating this list to friends and neighbors, he also bought an advertisement in The Rural American for $3.50. The ad resulted in $6.50 in seed orders. With this success, Park found his life's work.

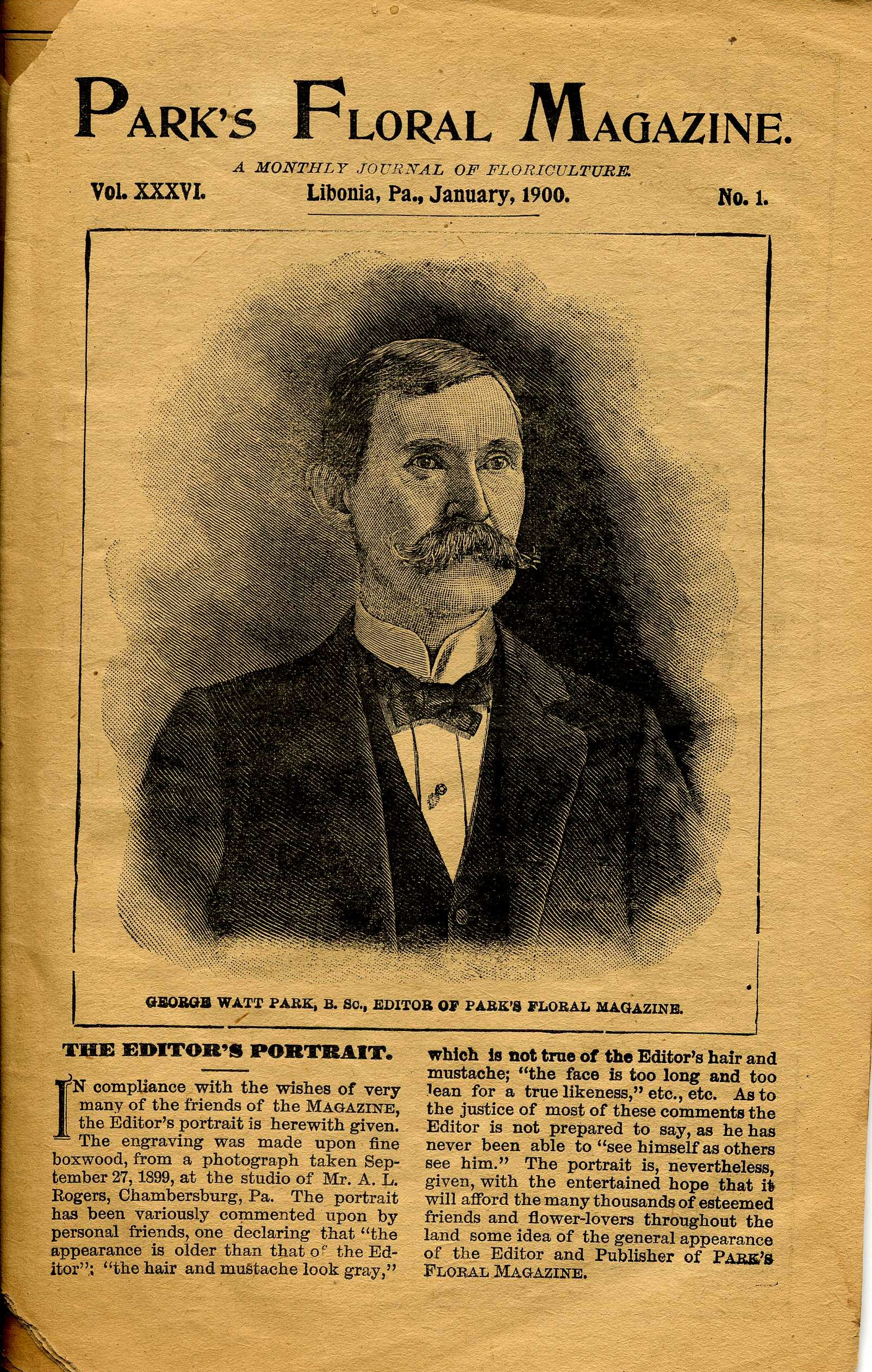
The cover of the January 1900 Park's Floral Magazine features a portrait of the founder, George Watt Park. From Park Seed Company archives.

Park Seed Company published its first small catalog in 1868. The book contained just 8 pages and used 2 illustrations—wood cuts of an aster and a pansy. In 1871, Park Seed initiated a monthly publication called The Floral Gazette. The publication was more magazine than catalog and offered its readers a forum for sharing gardening experiences and a seed exchange column that encouraged readers to trade seeds, bulbs and plants. It also carried a significant amount of advertising, including ads from other purveyors of seed. By 1877, the name had changed to Park's Floral Magazine and circulation had grown to 20,000. By 1918, that figure hit 800,000.

The growing number of catalogs brought in increasing numbers of orders, and by 1900, it was clear that the business had outgrown the small post office at Libonia. Park Seed Company moved to La Park (now Paradise), Pennsylvania in 1902.

In 1918, Park married Carol Mary Barratt, a young county home demonstration agent from South Carolina. Barrat(Park) moved to La Park and became both a partner in the business and the mother of two sons: George Barratt Park and William John Park.

Eventually the Park family moved to Dunedin, Florida, and produced a catalog there in 1923. Unfortunately, while the family enjoyed Florida, the heat and humidity proved to be highly unsuitable for storing seeds. In looking for a better environment for the business, they settled on Mary's hometown of Greenwood, South Carolina, and moved the business there in 1924.

For the first 25 years in Greenwood, Park Seed Company occupied a large old house. Then in 1950, they made a move to a more modern storefront location and entered the era of environmental control for seed quality.

Eventually, Park Seed obtained 500 acres (2 km^{2}) on the northern edge of Greenwood near Hodges, and designed and built there a total business complex to house the company's offices, research facilities, seed storage and processing areas, temperature-controlled areas for storing plants and bulbs, computer facilities, mailorder department, and customer service facility, plus its catalog preparation area and an area for its wholesale division. The core buildings of this campus were completed in 1961. The company resides there today, continually expanding and renewing the complex to meet changing requirements.

Wayside Gardens, an Ohio company founded in 1920, was acquired by Park Seed in 1975 and was moved to South Carolina.

The Park family ran the company until 2005, when it was sold to Florida real estate executive Donald Hachenberger. The company has been bought and sold since and is now a division of Jackson & Perkins Park Acquisitions, which is a subsidiary of publicly traded Western Capital Resources. Jackson & Perkins Park Acquisitions encompasses three garden brands Park Seed, Jackson & Perkins, and Wayside Gardens as well as the hardware brand Van Dykes Restorers.

In 2010, Blackstreet Capital agreed to acquire Park Seed Company for $12.8 million.

== See also ==
List of botanical gardens in the United States

George Watt Park

Park Seed Company

Wayside Gardens

All-America Selections
