= 1944 New Year Honours (New Zealand) =

Annual awards for New Zealanders

The 1944 New Year Honours in New Zealand were appointments by King George VI to various orders and honours in recognition of war service by New Zealanders. The awards celebrated the passing of 1943 and the beginning of 1944, and were announced on 1 January 1944. No civilian awards were made.

The recipients of honours are displayed here as they were styled before their new honour.

== Order of the Bath ==
=== Companion (CB) ===
Military division, additional

- Major-General Peter Harvey Bell DSO – New Zealand Staff Corps; of Auckland.
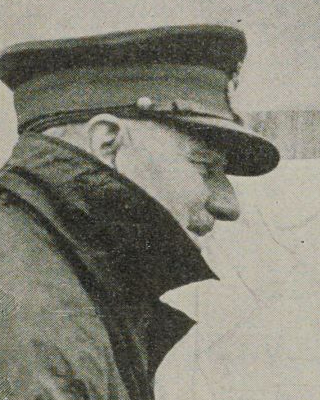
Peter Harvey Bell

== Order of the British Empire ==
=== Commander (CBE) ===
Military division, additional

- Acting Air Commodore Andrew McKee DSO DFC AFC – Royal Air Force.
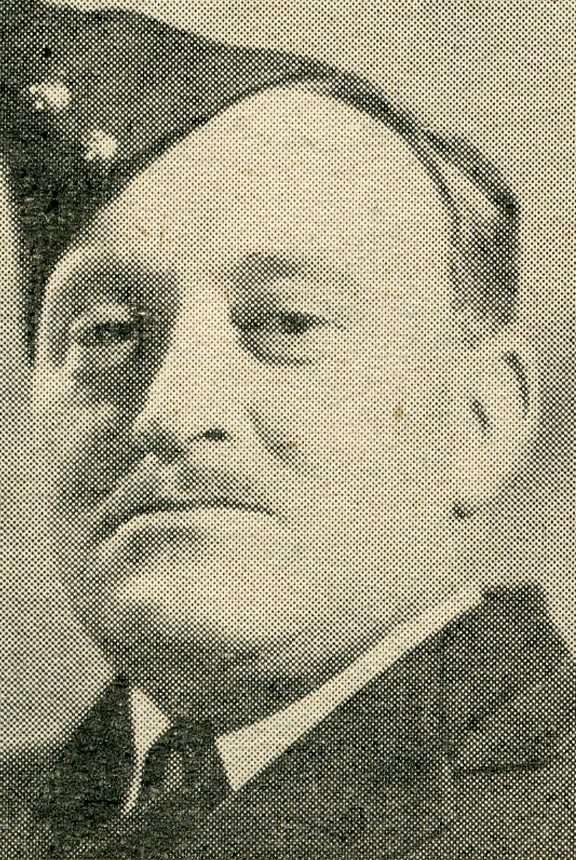
Andrew McKee

=== Officer (OBE) ===
Military division, additional

- Acting Captain Douglas Alfred Bingley – Royal New Zealand Navy; of Auckland.
- Squadron Leader Reginald James Gibbs – Royal New Zealand Air Force; of Christchurch.
- Major Donald Victor Thomas – New Zealand Military Forces; of Wellington.
- Lieutenant-Colonel (temporary Colonel) Claude Spencer White VD – New Zealand Military Forces; of Auckland.
- Ida Grace Willis RRC – matron-in-chief, New Zealand Army Nursing Service; of Wellington.

=== Member (MBE) ===
Military division, additional

- Captain George Bartrum Baker DCM MM – New Zealand Military Forces; of Cave.
- Captain Arthur Douglas Cooper – New Zealand Territorial Forces; of Christchurch.
- Captain James Paumea Ferris – New Zealand Military Forces; of Gisborne.
- Warrant Officer John Edward Keating McConnell – Royal New Zealand Air Force; of Auckland.
- Captain and Quartermaster James Green Milne – New Zealand Military Forces; of Paeroa
- Warrant Officer Class I Stuart Waters Richardson – New Zealand Military Forces; of Lower Hutt.
- Second Lieutenant Reginald Augustus Thomas – New Zealand Military Forces; of Claudelands.
- Captain Keith Owen Tunnicliffe – New Zealand Military Forces; of Pongakawa.

== British Empire Medal (BEM) ==
Military division

- Sergeant Leslie Marchant Amos – New Zealand Military Forces; of Auckland.
- Sergeant William George Bailey – New Zealand Engineers, New Zealand Military Forces; of Greymouth.
- Staff-Sergeant Francis Joseph Horby Brown – New Zealand Military Forces; of Whangārei.
- Corporal Walter Lloyd Fairweather – Royal New Zealand Air Force; of Ōtāhuhu.
- Staff-Sergeant (temporary Warrant Officer, Class I) Eric Rowland Firth – New Zealand Military Forces; of Trentham.
- Sergeant James Gordon Free – New Zealand Military Forces; of Kaponga.
- Sergeant Alick William Nathan – New Zealand Territorial Force; of Auckland.
- Staff-Sergeant Harry Tavendale – New Zealand Military Forces; of Christchurch.
- Lance-Sergeant Murray Reginald Waddell – New Zealand Engineers, New Zealand Military Forces.

== Royal Red Cross ==
=== Member (RRC) ===
- Gladys Lillian Thwaites – matron, New Zealand Army Nursing Service, Trentham Military Camp Hospital.

== Bar to Air Force Cross (AFC) ==
- Wing Commander James Francis Moir AFC – Reserve of Air Force Officers.

== Air Force Cross (AFC) ==
- Acting Squadron Leader Rex Donald Daniell – Royal Air Force; of Masterton.
- Acting Squadron Leader Robert Fletcher – Royal New Zealand Air Force; of Wellington.
- Acting Squadron Leader Arthur Montague Harvie – Royal New Zealand Air Force; of Wanganui.
- Acting Squadron Leader Walter Desmond Heaphy – Reserve of Air Force Officers; of Greymouth.
- Acting Squadron Leader Maurice Craig Kinder – Reserve of Air Force Officers; of Auckland.
- Acting Squadron Leader Roy John Alexander Leslie – Royal Air Force; of Waitara.
- Warrant Officer Harold William Player – Royal New Zealand Air Force; of Petone.
- Acting Wing Commander Kenneth Frederick Vare – Reserve of Air Force Officers; of Wellington.
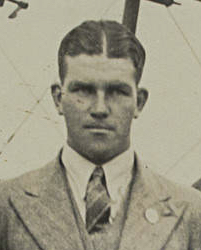
Maurice Kinder

== King's Commendation for Valuable Service in the Air ==
- Flying Officer Hilton James Valentine Atkins – Royal New Zealand Air Force; of Invercargill.
- Flying Officer Wallace Russel King – Royal New Zealand Air Force; of Te Kūiti.
- Flight Lieutenant Charles William Halliwell Thomson − Royal Air Force; of Stratford.

== Mention in despatches ==
- Temporary Lieutenant Thomas Keith Murdock Markwick – Royal New Zealand Naval Volunteer Reserve; of Auckland.
