= James McLeod (politician) =

New Zealand politician (1882–1944)

The Honourable James McLeod
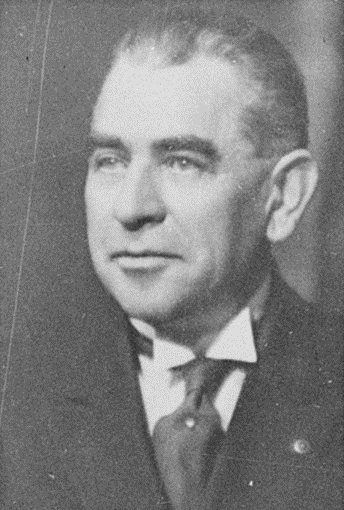

Member of the Legislative Council
- In office 22 June 1934 – 31 March 1944

Personal details
- Born: 1882 Otago, New Zealand
- Died: 31 March 1944 (aged 61–62) New Plymouth, New Zealand

James McLeod (1882 – 31 March 1944) was a member of the New Zealand Legislative Council from 22 June 1934 to 21 June 1941; and then 8 September 1941 to 31 March 1944. He was appointed by the United/Reform coalition Government, and was reappointed by the First Labour Government.

Born in Otago in 1882, McLeod served as president of the New Zealand Rugby Union on two occasions, and was manager of the All Blacks team on their 1929 tour of Australia. He was chairman of the Taranaki Rugby Football Union for 34 years and was involved in negotiations with the English Rugby Union in connection with the rules of the game. He also served as president of the Taranaki Jockey Club and was a member of the executive of the New Zealand Racing Conference. He died in New Plymouth on 31 March 1944, and was buried at Te Henui Cemetery.

In 1935, McLeod was awarded the King George V Silver Jubilee Medal.
