= George Park (Portland, Oregon) =

Public park in Portland, Oregon, U.S.

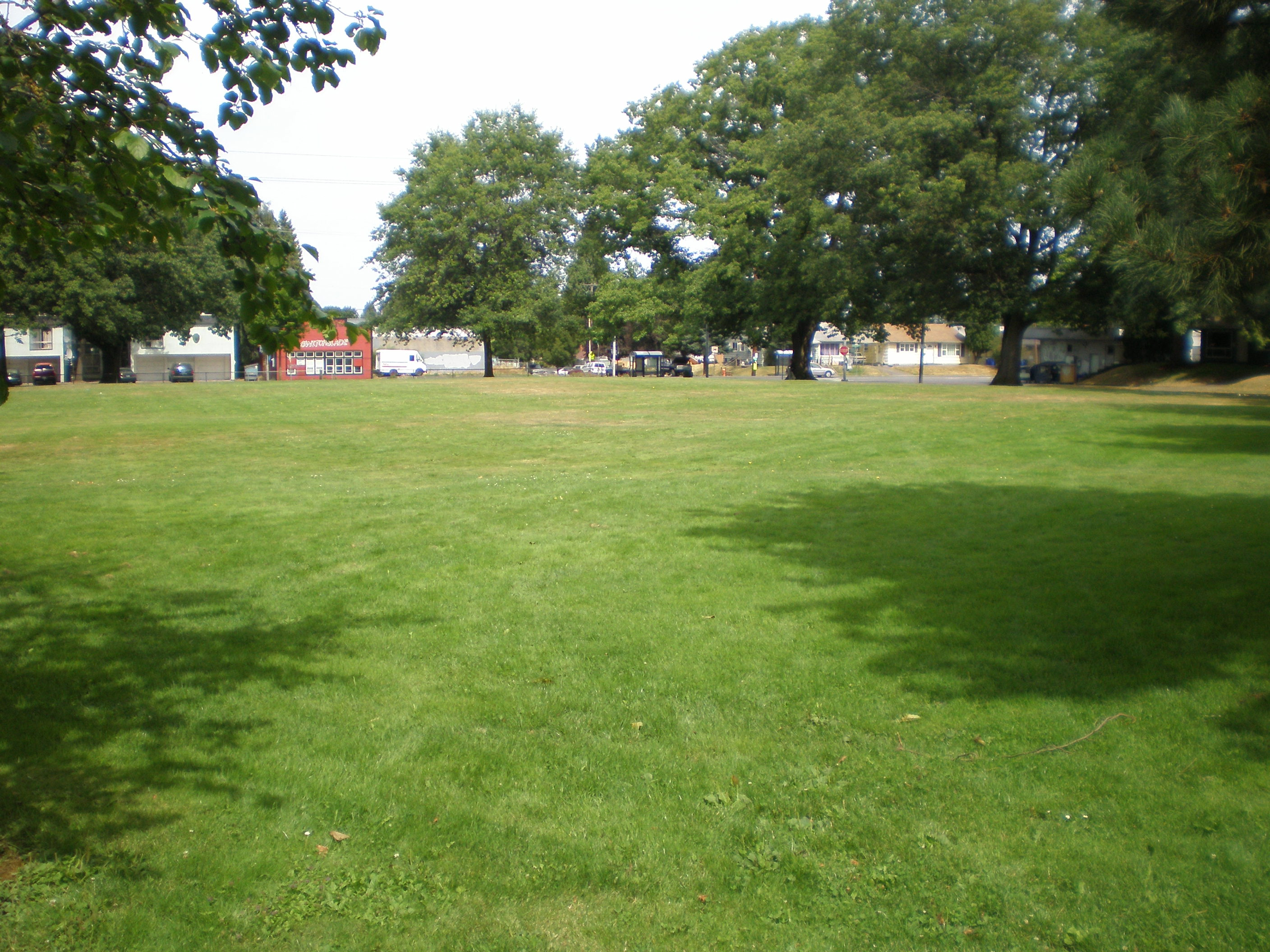
- The park in 2010

- Location within Portland, Oregon
- Location: N Burr Ave. and Fessenden St. Portland, Oregon
- Coordinates: 45.593684°N 122.739152°W
- Area: 2.03 acres (0.82 ha)
- Created: 1971
- Operator: Portland Parks & Recreation

George Park is a 2.03-acre (0.82 ha) public park in Portland, Oregon's St. Johns neighborhood, in the United States. Acquired in 1971, the park is named after Melvin Clark George.
