= George Watt Park =

American businessman

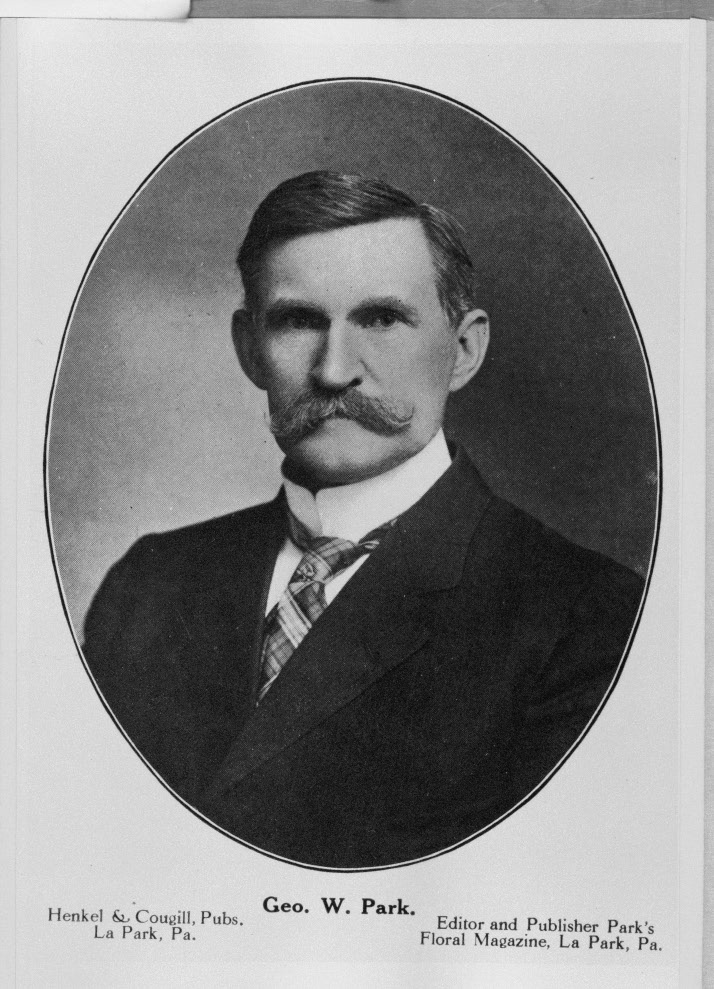
George Watt Park

George Watt Park (1853–1935) was an American businessman who founded the Geo. W. Park Seed Company, Inc., now known as Park Seed Company.

== Early life ==
Park was born in 1853, in Libonia, Pennsylvania, one of seven children. While just a young child, he demonstrated great interest in horticulture, and his mother encouraged him to raise flowers in a corner of her garden. He successfully grew a variety of plants and learned how to harvest his own seeds.

When Park was 15, he bought a hand press and printed a list of seeds that he had harvested and wanted to sell. In addition to giving the list to friends and neighbors, he also bought an advertisement in The Rural American for $3.50, that resulted in $6.50 in orders.

== Career ==
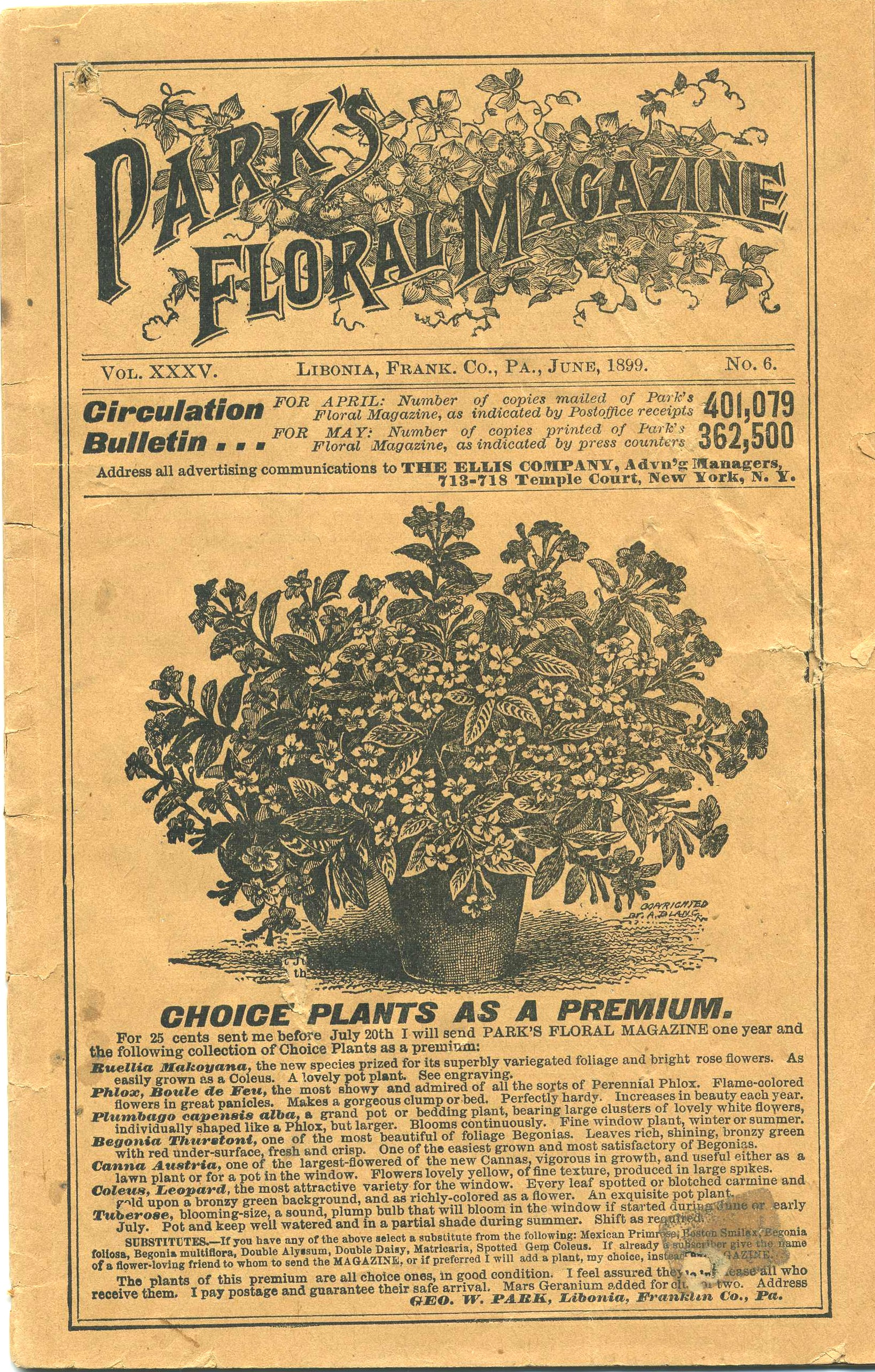
The cover of the June 1899 Park's Floral Magazine. Image provided courtesy of the Park Seed Company archive.

Park’s first catalog was published in 1868; it contained eight pages and used two illustrations, woodcuts of an aster and a pansy. In 1871, Park started a monthly magazine, The Floral Gazette, in which he offered gardening advice and created a forum where people could write in to share gardening experiences and trade seeds, bulbs and plants. Circulation of the magazine grew to 20,000 in 1877, and to over 800,000 by 1918.

Although Park changed the name of the monthly magazine to Park's Floral Magazine in 1877, and raised the subscription price to 50 cents a year to cover increased postal rates, thousands of loyal readers still felt they were getting a bargain.

In 1882, Park left his business to attend Michigan State University, where he graduated four years later with a degree in horticulture.

Park returned to his business, which continued to grow at Libonia, Pennsylvania. By the turn of the century, the company had outgrown the second-class post office at Libonia and, in 1902, moved to La Park.

Park began to travel, searching for new and better varieties of seeds and plants. From the Deep South, he acquired unusual semi-tropical plants and from the West he brought back many forms of cactus, that he propagated and offered to his customers. Park entertained his readers with accounts of his adventures across the U.S., Mexico and Europe.

== Personal life ==
During one of his trips, he stopped to visit Mary Barratt in Greenwood, South Carolina, who had written to him for advice on teaching horticulture to housewives; the two subsequently began exchanging letters. What began as friendship based on their common interest in plants, blossomed into love and they were married in 1918.

The couple and their two sons, George Barratt Park and William John Park, eventually moved to Dunedin, Florida, and printed a catalog there in 1923. The Parks liked living in Florida but discovered that their seeds would not keep fresh in the heat and humidity. They then moved to Mary’s hometown of Greenwood.

=== Death ===
Park died in 1935. Mary continued to run the company during the Great Depression and World War II, while raising their two boys. Until the time of her death in 1975, she remained true to her husband's business philosophy: “Your success and pleasure are more to Park than your money.”

== See also ==
- Park Seed Company
- Park Seed Company Gardens
- Wayside Gardens
