= Fanny Reading =

Medical practitioner and Jewish communal leader

Fanny Reading MBE
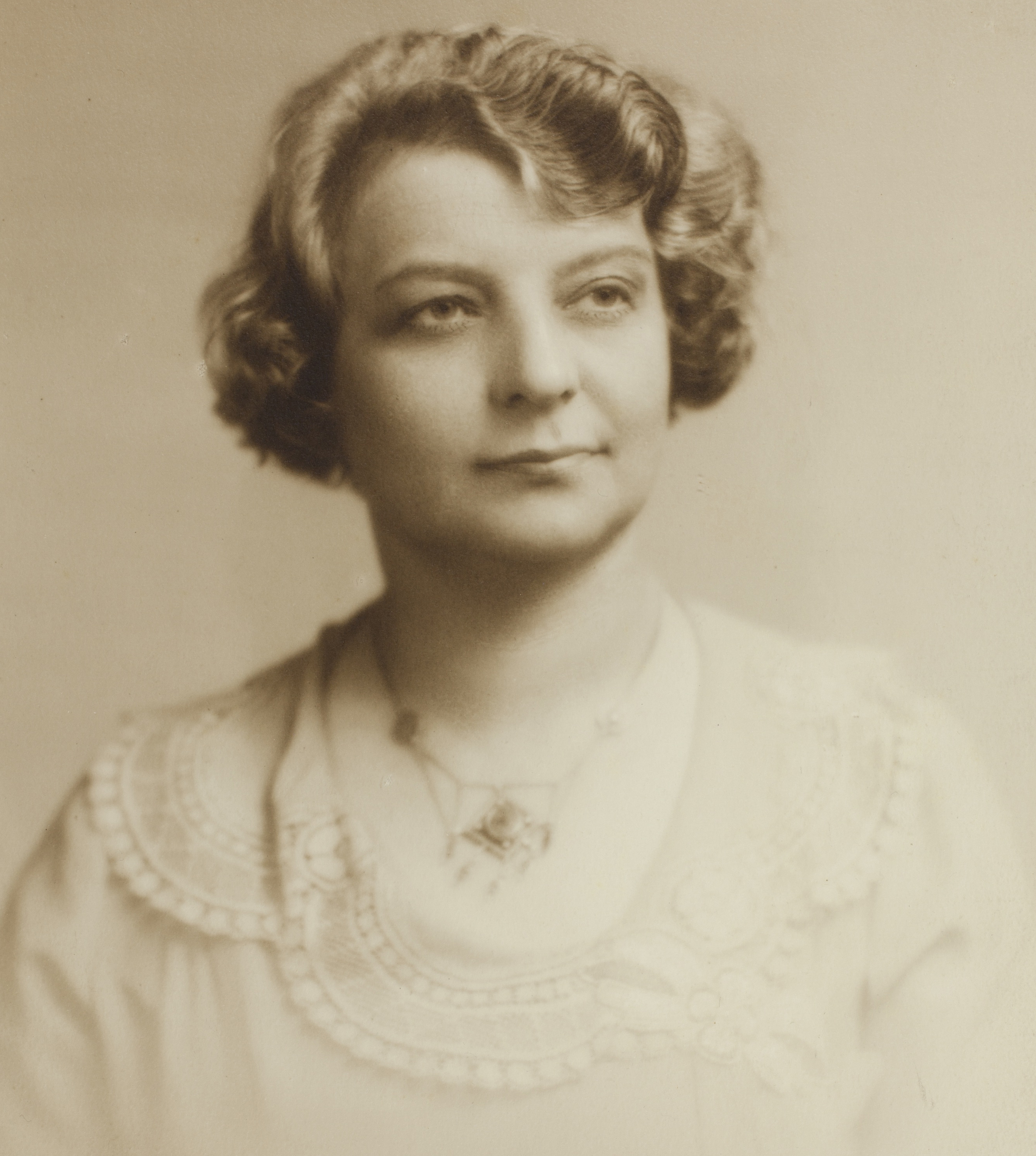
- Portrait of Dr Fanny Reading, Sydney, c. 1925
- Born: Fanny Rubinovich; 2 December 1884; Karelichy, near Minsk, Russia
- Died: 19 November 1974 (aged 89); Woollahra, New South Wales, Australia
- Occupations: Medical practitioner, Jewish community leader
- Height: 164 cm (5 ft 4 1/2 in)

Fanny Reading MBE (born Fanny Rubinovich; 2 December 1884 – 19 November 1974) was a Jewish Australian community leader and medical practitioner.

Reading is widely credited with encouraging Jewish Australian women to become more widely involved in discussions about Jewish issues throughout much of the 20th century.

== Early life and education ==
Fanny Rubinovich was born in Karelichy near Minsk in Russia in 1884. Her parents were Orthodox Jewish. She migrated to Australia with her mother in 1889 where her father had already emigrated to after Reading's birth.

Spending her childhood in Ballarat, Victoria, the family relocated to Melbourne in the early 1900s, where she completed her secondary education before attending the Melbourne Conservatorium of Music, graduating with a Diploma of Music in 1914.

In 1918, with the rise of racial antisemitism during World War I, Reading's father changed the family name from Rubinovich to Reading.

Reading returned to the University of Melbourne to study medicine, graduating in 1922.

== Career ==
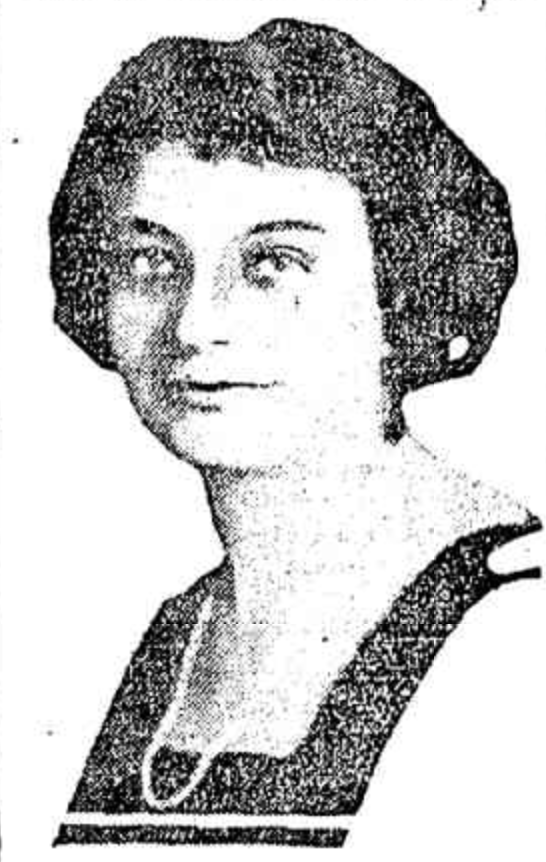
Fanny Reading in 1926 (studio photo)

Relocating to Sydney, she commenced a medical practice with her brother in Kings Cross.

Through her extensive work as a doctor, particularly with women and children, Reading became an honorary medical officer of the St George Hospital, Rachel Forster Hospital and the Wolper Jewish Hospital. Reading was also honoured by being appointed life governor of the Benevolent Society, the Dalwood Children's Homes and the Crown Street Women's Hospital.

=== Work with the Jewish community ===
Reading's early involvement with Jewish organisations included teaching part-time at the Hebrew School in St Kilda, serving as honorary secretary of Jewish literary society, Maccabean Union and serving as vice-president of the Jewish Young People's Association.

In 1923, inspired by Zionist emissary Bella Pevsner, Reading established the Council of Jewish Women of New South Wales, a Zionist organisation of which she was president between 1923 and 1931, adopting the ideals of philanthropy, education and service. In 1925, Reading attended a number of international events including an International Council of Jewish Women convention in Washington, D.C. and the Fourteenth Zionist Congress in Vienna, while also visiting Palestine before returning to Australia in March 1926. After new branches of the Council of Jewish Women had formed in different states of Australia, the National Council of Jewish Women was formed in 1929.

Throughout the 1930s, Reading helped Jewish refugees arriving in Australia from Nazi Germany through her immigration work with the Australian Jewish Welfare Society.

In the mid-1940s, Reading served as a vice-president of Youth Aliyah. In 1947, the Victorian branch of the National Jewish Council of Women honoured Reading for her Zionism work by raising £4000 to redeem a portion of land in Palestine in Reading's honour called "Nahlat Dr. Fanny Reading".

In 1957, after attending an International Council of Jewish Women convention in Israel, a settlement was named "Neve Zipporah", in honour of Reading's Hebrew name, Zipporah Rubinovich.

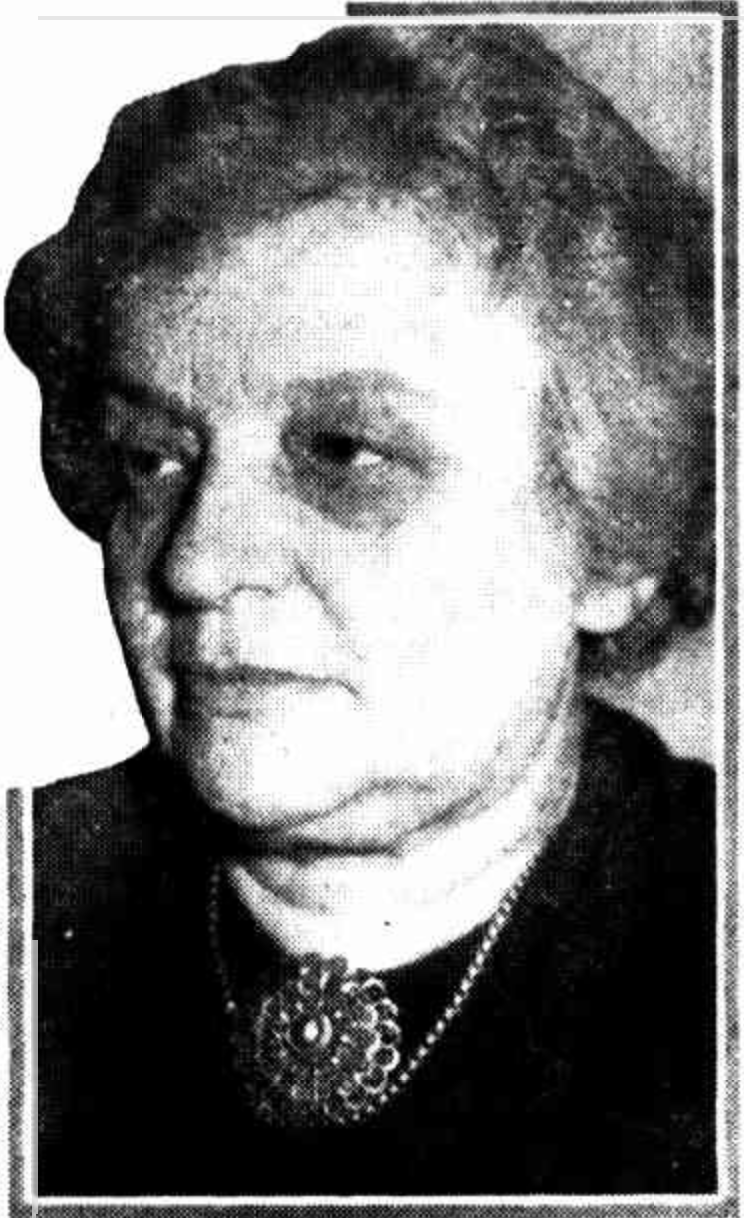
Reading in 1949

=== Defamation case ===
Sydney newspaper Smith's Weekly published an article on 31 May 1947 headlined "Huge funds to fight the British" which accused Jewish organisation Youth Aliyah of raising funds to fight British troops in Palestine. Following the article's publication, Reading attempted to sue National Press Pty Ltd for £10,000 in damages, believing that as a member and a vice-president of the association, her reputation and credibility had been damaged by the statements made in the newspaper article.

The magistrates ruled in favour of Smith's Weekly, stating that because Reading had not been identified in the article, there was no case and said that as the law stood, "a class, sect, congregation of people" could not be subject to libel action.

== Death and legacy ==
Reading died at the Wolper Jewish Hospital on 19 November 1974, and was buried in the Rookwood Cemetery in Sydney, New South Wales.

Since 1947, the University of Melbourne has offered the National Council of Jewish Women of Australia Fanny Reading Scholarship in Hebrew Language to foster Jewish and Hebrew studies. It was established when the National Council of Jewish Women presented the university with the sum of £600 to endow a scholarship named in their founders honour, for it to be presented to a Bachelor of Arts student with honours in Semitic Studies.

In 1953, an appeal was launched by the National Council of Jewish Women to establish an events venue in Reading's honour. It was officially opened as the NCJWA War Memorial Fanny Reading Council House in Woollahra in 1963.

Upon the Wolper Jewish Hospital in Woollahra completing expansions in 1966, a new surgical wing was named the Fanny Reading Wing.

In December 1971, when Australian Prime Minister William McMahon opened the National Jewish Memorial Centre in the Canberra suburb of Forrest, his wife Sonia McMahon unveiled a plaque and dedicated the centre's auditorium as the Fanny Reading Auditorium.

== Awards and honours ==
- 1935, King George V Coronation Medal
- 1937, King George VI Coronation Medal
- MBE in the 1961 Queen's Birthday honours list
- 2010, Reading was posthumously added to the Victorian Honour Roll of Women
