= Charles Gorrell =

Lt. Colonel in the Canadian Army Medical Corps

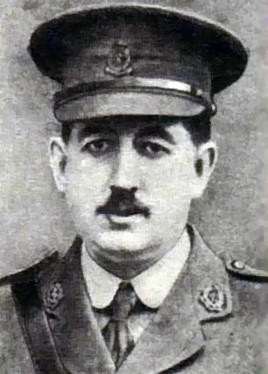
Charles Gorrell

Charles Wilson Farran Gorrell (1871–1917) was a Lt. Colonel in the Canadian Army Medical Corps. He killed himself at Maida Vale in England following a scandal, but his exact role in the scandal or culpability for any misdeeds is unclear. Gorrell has an entry in the Dictionary of Canadian Biography.

On 27 January 1915, Gorrell was appointed to command the Duchess of Connaught’s Canadian Red Cross Hospital at Taplow, which had more than a thousand beds, and was promoted to lieutenant-colonel six days later. From April 1915, with heavy fighting on the Western Front, Canadian casualties flowed in. Gorrell was made a temporary colonel on 8 August 1916.

In 1916, a non-commissioned officer was convicted of accepting bribes from tradesmen who wished to sell the hospital supplies. Gorrell was under no suspicion, but he took his responsibility as commanding officer to be such that criticism should involve him. By 23 December 1916, he had been admitted to Queen Alexandra Military Hospital with a diagnosis of “Paralysis Functional”, meaning that he was incapable of functioning normally, although no physical reason could be found. The diagnosis indicates a severe mental disturbance, but after only four days he was discharged as fully recovered. On 25 January 1917, he was found dead at a house in Maida Vale. A pharmacist told the coroner’s inquest that he had sold Gorrell some prussic acid a short time before his death. The verdict was suicide due to temporary insanity, and the cause of death prussic acid poisoning.
