= Geoffrey Nevill (resident commissioner) =

New Zealand public servant

Geoffrey Nevill OBE JP

Resident Commissioner of the Cook Islands
- In office 1952–1961
- Preceded by: William Tailby
- Succeeded by: Oliver Dare

Resident Commissioner of the Chatham Islands
- In office 1950–1952

Personal details
- Born: 31 October 1900 New Zealand
- Died: 22 October 1972 (aged 71)

Geoffrey Nevill OBE JP (31 October 1900 – 22 October 1972) was a New Zealand public servant who served as Resident Commissioner of the Chatham Islands and Cook Islands between 1950 and 1961. He was a member of the Polynesian Society.

== Biography ==
Born on 31 October 1900, Nevill was the son of Henry Guy Nevill and Rosa Louisa Nevill (née Bull). The younger brother of Arthur Nevill, Chief of the Royal New Zealand Air Force between 1946 and 1951, he attended school in Australia and Auckland Grammar School. He joined the public service in 1939 and worked as a farm appraiser for the State Advances Corporation. He was appointed Resident Commissioner of the Chatham Islands in February 1950, serving until 1952 when he became Resident Commissioner of the Cook Islands. He remained in post until retiring in January 1961.

In 1953, Nevill was awarded the Queen Elizabeth II Coronation Medal, and he was appointed an Officer of the Order of the British Empire in the 1961 New Year Honours.

Nevill died on 22 October 1972.
