= Carrick Robertson =

Scottish-New Zealand surgeon

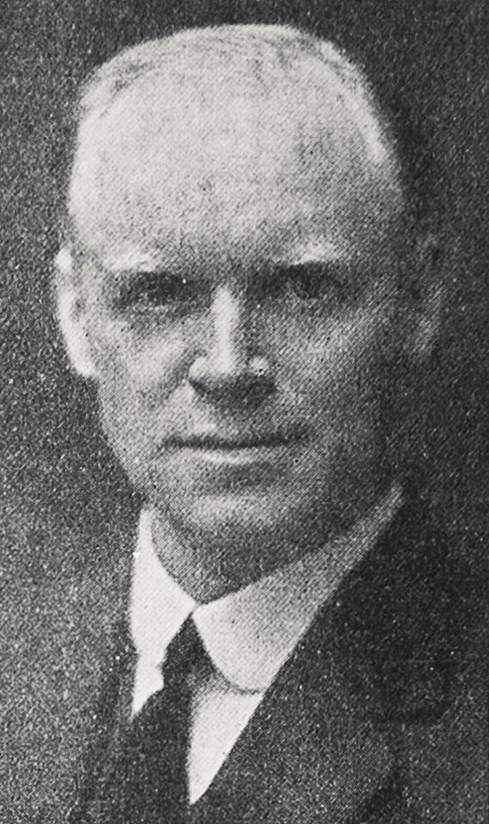
- Born: Carrick Hey Robertson; 27 August 1879; Auckland, New Zealand
- Died: 14 July 1963 (aged 83); Auckland, New Zealand
- Education: University of London, Guy's Hospital
- Occupation: Surgeon
- Medical career
- Field: Neurosurgery

Sir Carrick Hey Robertson (27 August 1879 – 14 July 1963) was a Scottish-born New Zealand surgeon who specialised in goitre and neurosurgery. He practised at Auckland Hospital and the Mater Misericordiae Hospital.

== Early life and education ==
Robertson was born in Glasgow, Lanarkshire, Scotland, in 1879. He attended St Dunstan's College in London and then trained at Guy's Hospital and the University of London where he graduated in 1902.

== Career ==
Robertson practiced in Natal, South Africa for two years before emigrating to New Zealand where he took up the position of surgeon at Waihi Hospital. He spent five years as superintendent of the hospital before moving to private practice in Auckland as well as an honorary surgeon at Auckland Hospital.

In the First World War Robertson served as a temporary major from 1915 to 1916 in the New Zealand Medical Corps on board the hospital ship Marama.

Robertson was a recognised expert in surgery for goitre (then common in New Zealand) and was a national pioneer of neurosurgery. He and Dr Casement Aickin performed the first heart operation in Auckland and probably New Zealand in 1927 but the patient did not survive. He developed surgery at Auckland Hospital and played an influential role in the development of surgical services at the Mater Misericordiae Hospital. In 1937 he retired from his position as honorary surgeon at Auckland Hospital but continued as a surgeon at the Mater where he was a lecturer at the nursing school. He was medical superintendent at the Mater from 1937 to 1953.

In 1924 Robertson was made an honorary fellow of the American College of Surgeons. He was a founding fellow of the Royal Australasian College of Surgeons and in 1947 made an honorary fellow of the Association of Surgeons of Great Britain and Ireland.

== Honours and awards ==
Robertson was awarded the British War Medal 1914–1920. He was appointed a Knight Bachelor in the 1929 New Year Honours and knighted at an investiture in St James's Palace, London. In 1938 he was made a Chevalier de la Légion d'honneur.

== Personal life ==
Robertson was married twice and had four children with his first wife Constance who died in 1950. He married his second wife Delta Clark in 1957. Robertson lived at Rannoch a historic house in Almorah Rd from 1932 to 1963.

From 1936–37 he was president of the Auckland Institute and Museum.

== Death and legacy ==
Robertson died on 14 July 1963 at the Mater Hospital. He was buried at Purewa Cemetery in the Auckland suburb of Meadowbank.

The Carrick Robertson Prize is a surgery prize awarded to a student at the University of Auckland Medical School.

== Selected publications ==
- Robertson, C. H. (1909). "Acute Pancreatitis Followed by Pancreatic Abscess: Operation: Recovery". British Medical Journal. 1 (2508): 211–212. doi:10.1136/bmj.1.2508.211. PMC 2317898. PMID 20764267.
- Sweet, G. B.; Robertson, C. (1927). "A Case of Congenital Atresia of the Jejunum (With Recovery)". Archives of Disease in Childhood. 2 (9): 186–188. doi:10.1136/adc.2.9.186. PMC 1974959. PMID 21031694.
- Robertson, Carrick (1945). "Malignant Exophthalmos or Exophthalmic Ophthalmoplegia". Australian and New Zealand Journal of Surgery. 14 (4): 262–265. doi:10.1111/j.1445-2197.1945.tb02953.x.
- Robertson, C. (1948). "Thyrotoxicosis". Postgraduate Medical Journal. 24 (277): 571–578. doi:10.1136/pgmj.24.277.571. PMC 2529825. PMID 18105125.
