= George John Park =

New Zealand technical college principal (1880–1977)

George John Park OBE (1880–1977) was a New Zealand teacher and technical college principal. He was born in Waitaki, Otago, New Zealand in 1880.

In 1935, he was awarded the King George V Silver Jubilee Medal. He was appointed an Officer of the Order of the British Empire for services to education and in connection with the work of the Crippled Children's Society in the 1955 New Year Honours.
