= Resident Commissioner of the Cook Islands =

The Resident Commissioner of the Cook Islands was the highest authority present in the Cook Islands between 1901 and 1965. The post was created on 11 June 1901 when New Zealand took over responsibility for the islands, replacing the British resident, and was succeeded by the New Zealand high commissioner. The post-holder was also the presiding officer of the Legislative Council from 1946 until 1957.

== List of resident commissioners ==
The following table is a complete list of resident commissioners from 1901 to 1965:

Dates	Resident Commissioner
1901–1909	Walter Edward Gudgeon
1909–1913	James Eman Smith
1913–1916	Henry William Northcroft
1916–1921	Frederick Platts
1921–1923	John George Lewis Hewitt
1923–1937	Hugh Ayson
1937–1938	Stephen Smith
1938–1943	Hugh Ayson
1943–1951	William Tailby
1951–1960	Geoffrey Nevill
1960–1965	Oliver Dare
