= Gordon Whyte =

Gordon Whyte may refer to:

- Gordon Whyte (cricketer)
- Gordon Whyte (Canadian football)

== See also ==
- Gordon White (disambiguation)
