= Alexander Grant =

Alexander or Alex Grant may refer to:

== The arts ==
- Alex da Kid, English hip-hop producer Alexander Grant (born 1982)
- Alex Grant (musician) (born 1974), bass guitarist for Idlewild and DeSalvo
- Alex Grant (poet), Scottish-American poet, teacher
- Alexander Grant (dancer) (1925–2011), founding member of the Birmingham Royal Ballet

== Politicians ==
=== Canada ===
- Alexander Grant (Upper Canada politician) (1734–1813), Canadian politician, Lieutenant Governor of Upper Canada
- Alexander Grant (Nova Scotia politician) (1830–1900), merchant and politician in Nova Scotia
- Alexander James Grant (1829–1909), Canadian politician

=== United Kingdom ===
- Sir Alexander Grant, 8th Baronet (1782–1854), British Member of Parliament
- Sir Alexander Grant, 5th Baronet (1705–1772), British Member of Parliament for Inverness Burghs
- Alexander Grant (Scottish politician) (c. 1673–1719), Member of the 1st Parliament of Great Britain
- Alexander Grant (British Army officer) (1775–1827), army officer and colonial commandant in the Gambia

=== United States ===
- Alexander Grant (Massachusetts politician) (1853–1935), Massachusetts machinist and politician
- Alexander R. Grant (1925–2001), Wisconsin politician

== Sportspeople ==
- Alec Grant (1893–1966), New Zealand cricketer
- Alex Grant (soccer) (born 1994), English-born Australian soccer player
- Alex Grant (ice hockey) (born 1989), ice hockey player
- Alexander Grant (athlete) (1875–1946), American track and field athlete who competed at the 1900 Summer Olympics
- Alex Grant (long jumper) (born 1934), Scottish long jumper
- Alexander McGregor Grant (1888–1973), Australian rules footballer, New Zealand surgeon, horse-racing administrator, racehorse owner and breeder
- Lex Grant (born 1962), Scottish footballer

== Other ==
- Sir Alexander Grant, 1st Baronet (1864–1937), creator of recipe for McVitie's digestive biscuit, managing director of firm and benefactor to National Library of Scotland
- Sir Alexander Grant, 10th Baronet (1826–1884), principal of the University of Edinburgh
- Alexander Grant (bishop) (1693–1727), Scottish Roman Catholic clergyman
- Alexander Grant McLean (1824–1862), Surveyor General of New South Wales
- Alexander Grant (IMS) (1817–1900), surgeon in the Indian Medical Service
