= Wunsch =

Wunsch is a German surname. Notable people with the surname include:

- Carl Wunsch (born 1941), American oceanographer
- Donald Frederick Sandys Wunsch (1887–1973), New Zealand chemical engineer and factory manager
  - Donald Wunsch, son of D.F.S. Wunsch and computer engineer
- Harry Wunsch (1910–1954), guard in the National Football League
- Ilse Gerda Wunsch (1911-2003), German-American composer
- Jerry Wunsch (born 1974), former American college and professional football player
- Johann Jakob von Wunsch (1717–1788), soldier of fortune and Prussian general of infantry, and a particularly adept commander of light infantry
- Kelly Wunsch (born 1972), former professional baseball pitcher
- Noah Wunsch (born 1970), German painter, photographer and designer

== See also ==
- Wunsch Building, in Brooklyn, New York
- Needleman–Wunsch algorithm, algorithm used in bioinformatics to align protein or nucleotide sequences
