= Grace Widdowson =

New Zealand nurse

Grace Widdowson OBE
- Born: 14 June 1892; Christchurch, New Zealand
- Died: 3 August 1989 (aged 97); Christchurch, New Zealand
- Occupation: Matron

Muriel Grace Widdowson OBE (14 June 1892 – 3 August 1989) was a New Zealand nurse. She was the superintendent of various hospitals in North Canterbury from 1935 until her retirement in 1952. A year before her retirement, Widdowson was named an Officer of the Order of the British Empire at the 1951 New Year Honours,

== Early life and education ==
Widdowson was born on 14 June 1892 in Christchurch, New Zealand. Her father, Howell Young Widdowson, was a solicitor in Christchurch and a member of Christchurch City Council; he had been unsuccessful in the 1881 and 1895 Christchurch mayoral elections. After moving with her family to Dunedin, she went to school at Braemar House and completed a three year nursing programme at Christchurch Hospital in 1921. Widdowson completed additional training at hospitals in Rangiora and Christchurch in 1927.

== Career ==
In 1921, Widdowson began her nursing career. She originally worked in Europe for five years before moving back to Christchurch in 1926. Upon returning to Christchurch, she resumed working at Christchurch Hospital for multiple terms from 1926 to 1928. After her departure from Christchurch Hospital, Widdowson started teaching at the Porirua Lunatic Asylum in 1928. She stayed until 1930 before going to Auckland Hospital to teach for a five year tenure. The following year, Widdowson went back to Christchurch for a final year as an assistant to the matron.

Outside of her career in teaching, Widdowson was in charge of multiple North Canterbury hospitals as a superintendent starting in 1936 until her retirement from nursing in 1952. After her retirement, she was a part of the relocation of the Nurses' Memorial Chapel where she revealed the St. Faith glassed window in 1971.

== Death ==
Widdowson died on 3 August 1989.

== Awards and honours ==
In the 1951 New Year Honours, Widdowson was appointed as an Officer of the Order of the British Empire.
