= Alex McKenzie =

New Zealand sharebroker and National Party president

Sir Alex McKenzie KBE

5th President of the National Party
- In office 1951–1962
- Preceded by: Wilfrid Sim
- Succeeded by: Jack Meadowcroft

Personal details
- Born: Alexander McKenzie; 26 October 1896 Invercargill, New Zealand
- Died: 20 August 1992 (aged 95) Auckland, New Zealand
- Political party: National
- Spouse: Constance Mary Howard (m. 1935; died 1966)
- Children: 4
- Occupation: Sharebroker

Sir Alexander McKenzie KBE (26 October 1896 – 20 August 1992) was a New Zealand sharebroker and company director. He served as president of the National Party from 1951 to 1962.

== Biography ==
Born in Invercargill on 26 October 1896, McKenzie was the son of Alexander and Isabella McKenzie. He was educated at Southland Technical College and Southland Boys' High School.

McKenzie enlisted in the New Zealand Expeditionary Force during World War I on 14 November 1916, and saw active service in France with the New Zealand Rifle Brigade. He was wounded in action on 18 August 1917, and was subsequently assessed as being permanently unfit for active service and returned to New Zealand for discharge.

McKenzie married Constance Mary Howard on 10 October 1935, and the couple went on to have four children.

McKenzie was a sharebroker, underwriter, and director of several companies. He was chair of the Auckland division of the National Party from 1942 until being elected as party president in 1951, in which role he served until 1962.

In 1953, McKenzie was awarded the Queen Elizabeth II Coronation Medal. In the 1962 New Year Honours, he was appointed a Knight Commander of the Order of the British Empire, for political services. He died in Auckland on 20 August 1992, aged 95.

Party political offices
Preceded by Wilfrid Sim	President of the National Party; 1951–1962	Succeeded by Jack Meadowcroft
