= 1957 New Year Honours (New Zealand) =

Annual awards for New Zealanders

The 1957 New Year Honours in New Zealand were appointments by Elizabeth II on the advice of the New Zealand government to various orders and honours to reward and highlight good works by New Zealanders. The awards celebrated the passing of 1956 and the beginning of 1957, and were announced on 1 January 1957.

The recipients of honours are displayed here as they were styled before their new honour.

== Knight Bachelor ==
- The Honourable Joseph Stanton – second senior puisne judge of the Supreme Court.
- Leonard Morton Wright – mayor of the City of Dunedin.
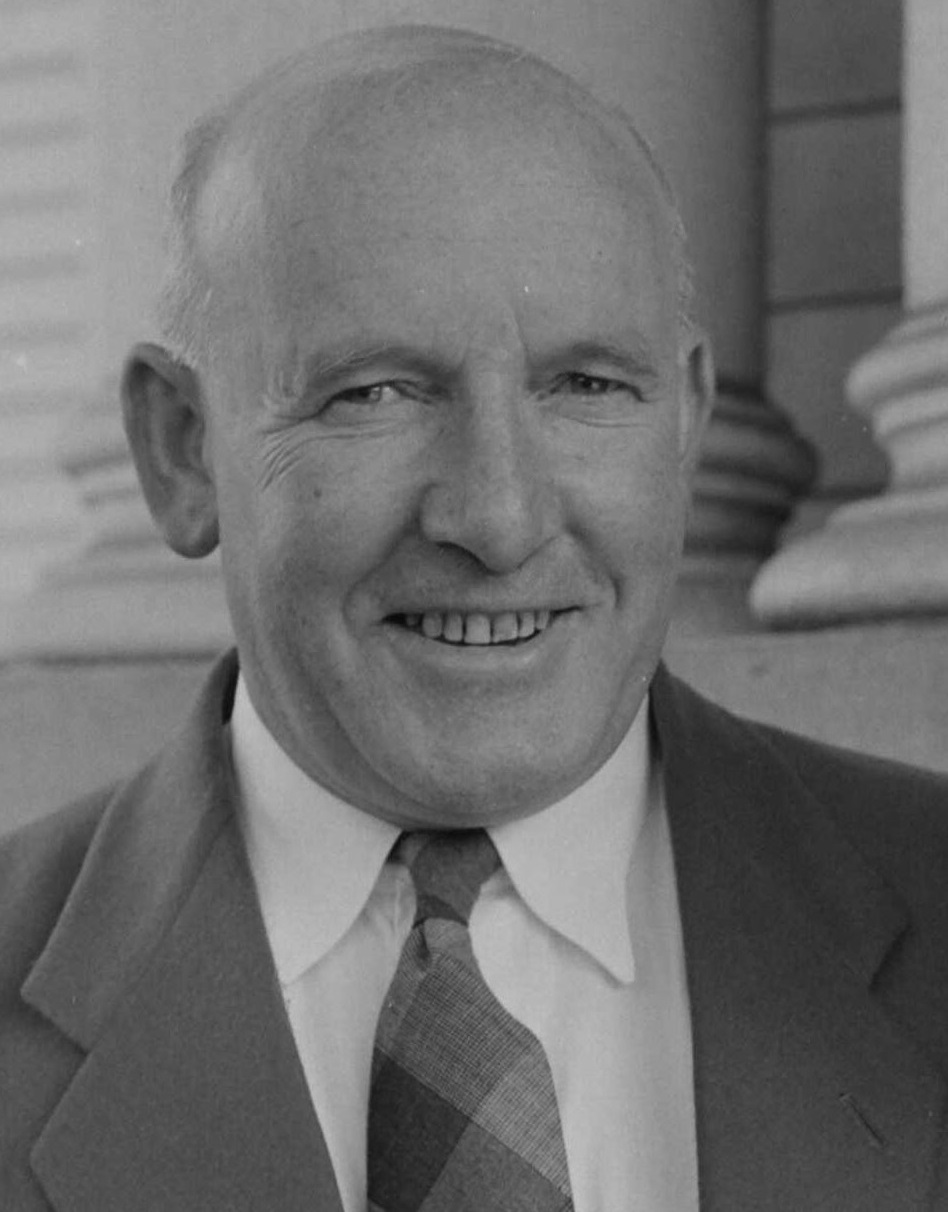
Sir Len Wright

== Order of the Bath ==
=== Companion (CB) ===
Military division

- Rear-Admiral John Edwin Home McBeath DSO DSC – on loan to the Royal New Zealand Navy.

== Order of Saint Michael and Saint George ==
=== Companion (CMG) ===
- Herbert Edgar Evans – solicitor-general.
- Alister Donald McIntosh – permanent head of the Prime Minister's Department and secretary of External Affairs.

== Order of the British Empire ==
=== Commander (CBE) ===
Civil division

- John Andrew – of Hyde. For services to farming.
- The Honourable William Edward Barnard – of Tauranga. For political and public services.
- Herbert Victor Searle – principal of Nelson College, 1933–56.
- The Honourable Tupua Tamasese – a member of the Executive Council of Western Samoa.
- The Honourable Malietoa Tanumafili – a member of the Executive Council of Western Samoa.

Military division

- Air Commodore Ian Gordon Morrison OBE – Royal New Zealand Air Force.
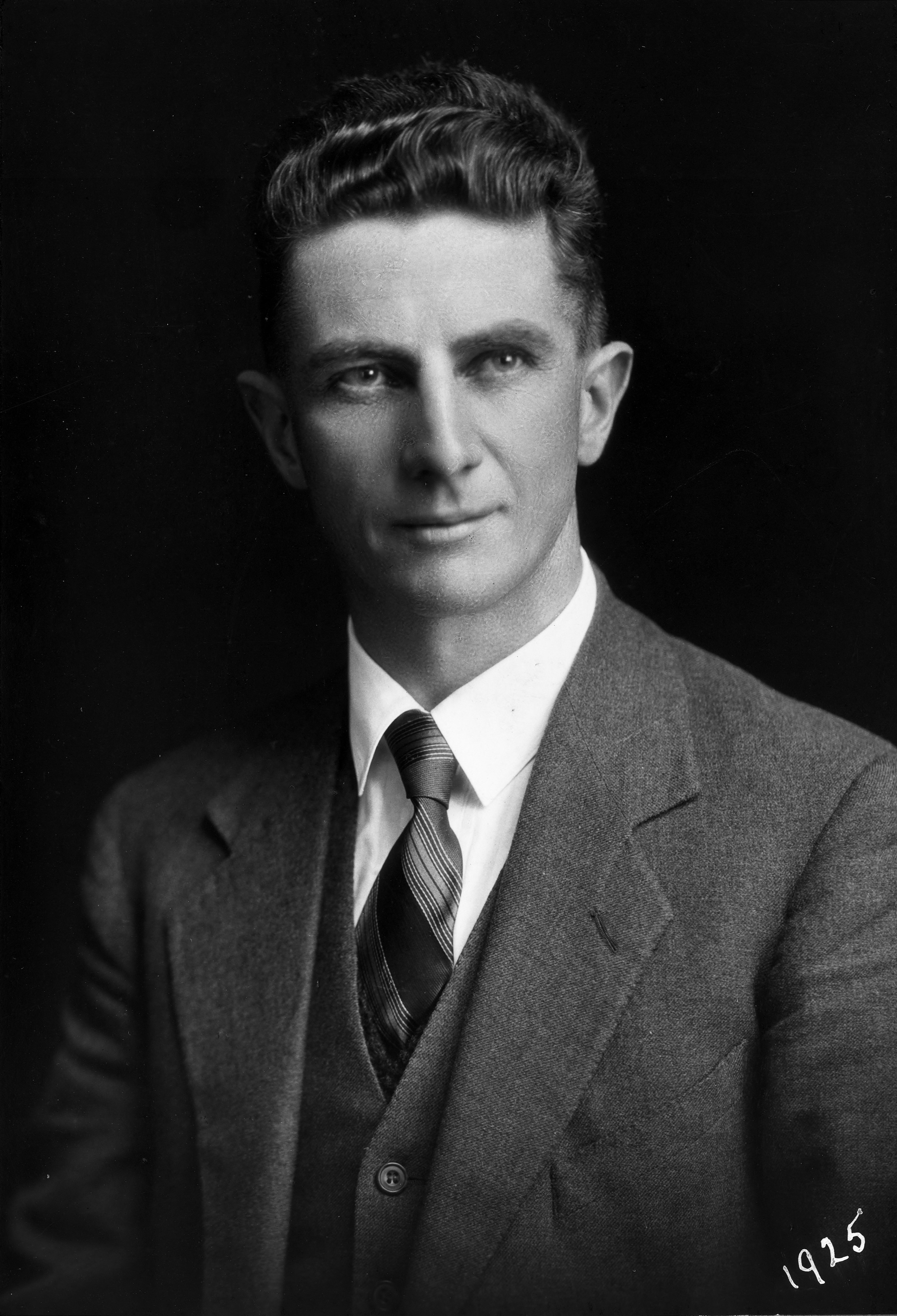
Bill Barnard

=== Officer (OBE) ===
Civil division

- Frederick Norman Ambler – a member of the Auckland City Council.
- Elizabeth Scally Brown – secretary of the Registered Nurses' Association.
- John Gilkison – chairman of the board of directors, Southland Frozen Meat Company.
- Thomas Douglas Baird Hay – of Auckland. For services to sport.
- The Reverend Canon Poihipi Mokena Kohere – of Tikitiki. For services to the Māori people.
- William Calder Mackay MC – a member of the Auckland City Council.
- Lachlan MacLean – of Hastings. For services to farming.
- The Reverend Thomas Arthur Pybus – of Dunedin. For services as a minister of the Methodist Church in Otago and Southland for over 40 years.
- Henry Hamilton Wauchop (Senior) – of Christchurch. For services to the community.
- Donald Frederick Sandys Wunsch – chairman of the advisory council of Scientific and Industrial Research.

Military division

- Acting Captain Brian Edmund Turner DSC – Royal New Zealand Navy.
- Lieutenant-Colonel Stanley Frederick Catchpole MC ED – Royal New Zealand Artillery (Territorial Force).
- Squadron Leader Maurice Beehan Furlong – Royal New Zealand Air Force.
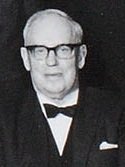
Fred Ambler

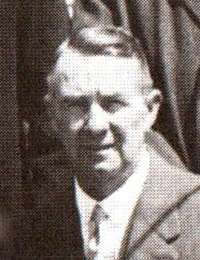
Douglas Hay

=== Member (MBE) ===
Civil division

- Vida Mary Barron – senior lecturer at the University of Otago, and a former Dominion president of the New Zealand Federation of University Women.
- William Bell – of Invercargill. For services to the community in local-body activities, especially educational.
- Robert Bruce – mayor of Akaroa.
- Llewellyn John Collins – county clerk and treasurer of the Waimate County Council.
- Raymond James George Collins – of Christchurch; a prominent philatelist.
- Rangitiaria Dennan – a prominent guide in the Rotorua district. For services to the tourist movement.
- Annie Dundon. For services to the Marlborough Hospital Board.
- Hanson Home Fraser – chairman of the Timaru High School's board of governors, and secretary of the Timaru Fire Board.
- Sydney Freeman – Dominion organising secretary, Federation of Young Farmers' Clubs.
- Norah Gibbons – president of the Kindergarten Association.
- Catherine Goodsir – of Taumarunui. For social welfare services.
- William Charles Kennedy – of Te Aroha. For services to the community in local-body work.
- Leonard Albert McIntosh – secretary of the Kaitaia Dairy Company.
- Jack Meltzer – general secretary of the Police Association.
- William Herbert Sandford – of Raetihi. For services to the community in local-body work.
- William Thomas Strand – of Lower Hutt. For services to local government.
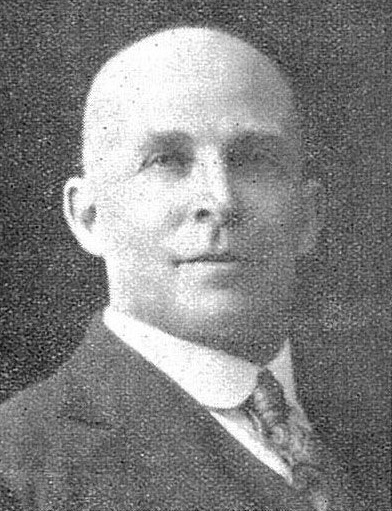
Will Strand

Military division

- Supply Lieutenant John Harper Craig – Royal New Zealand Navy.
- Warrant Officer Class II Lindsay Easter Pallister Atkin – Royal New Zealand Infantry (Territorial Force).
- Warrant Officer Class II Noel McLennan – Royal New Zealand Armoured Corps (Territorial Force).
- Major Douglas Stewart Ross – Royal New Zealand Infantry (Territorial Force).
- Major Richard James Holden Webb – Royal New Zealand Artillery (Regular Force).
- Flight Lieutenant Colin Francis Laloli DFC – Royal New Zealand Air Force.
- Flight Lieutenant Colin Ernest Baird Papps DFC – Royal New Zealand Air Force.

== British Empire Medal (BEM) ==
Civil division

- Edward Buckley – constable, New Zealand Police Force, Waiuku.
- William George Wood – constable, New Zealand Police Force, Winton.

Military division

- Chief Engine Room Artificer Arthur Malcolm Roxborough Bennett – Royal New Zealand Navy.
- Chief Shipwright James Patrick Dobbyn – Royal New Zealand Navy.
- Chief Petty Officer Fredrick George Heath – Royal New Zealand Navy.
- Acting Chief Petty Officer Donald Edward Tuck – Royal New Zealand Navy.
- 34807 Sergeant Ronald Alexander Watson – Royal New Zealand Army Service Corps (Regular Force).
- 70427 Flight Sergeant Kenneth James Clark – Royal New Zealand Air Force.
- 71251 Sergeant William Henry O'Byrne – Royal New Zealand Air Force.

== Air Force Cross (AFC) ==
- Wing Commander Douglas Fitzclarence St George DFC – Royal New Zealand Air Force.
- Squadron Leader William Medworth Golden – Royal New Zealand Air Force.
