= Christina McDonald =

Christina McDonald may refer to:

- Christina McDonald (gymnast) (born 1969), Canadian gymnast
- Christina McDonald (nurse) (1911–1986), New Zealand military nurse
- Christina McDonald (politician), Canadian New Democratic Party candidate
