= Queen Elizabeth II Coronation Medal =

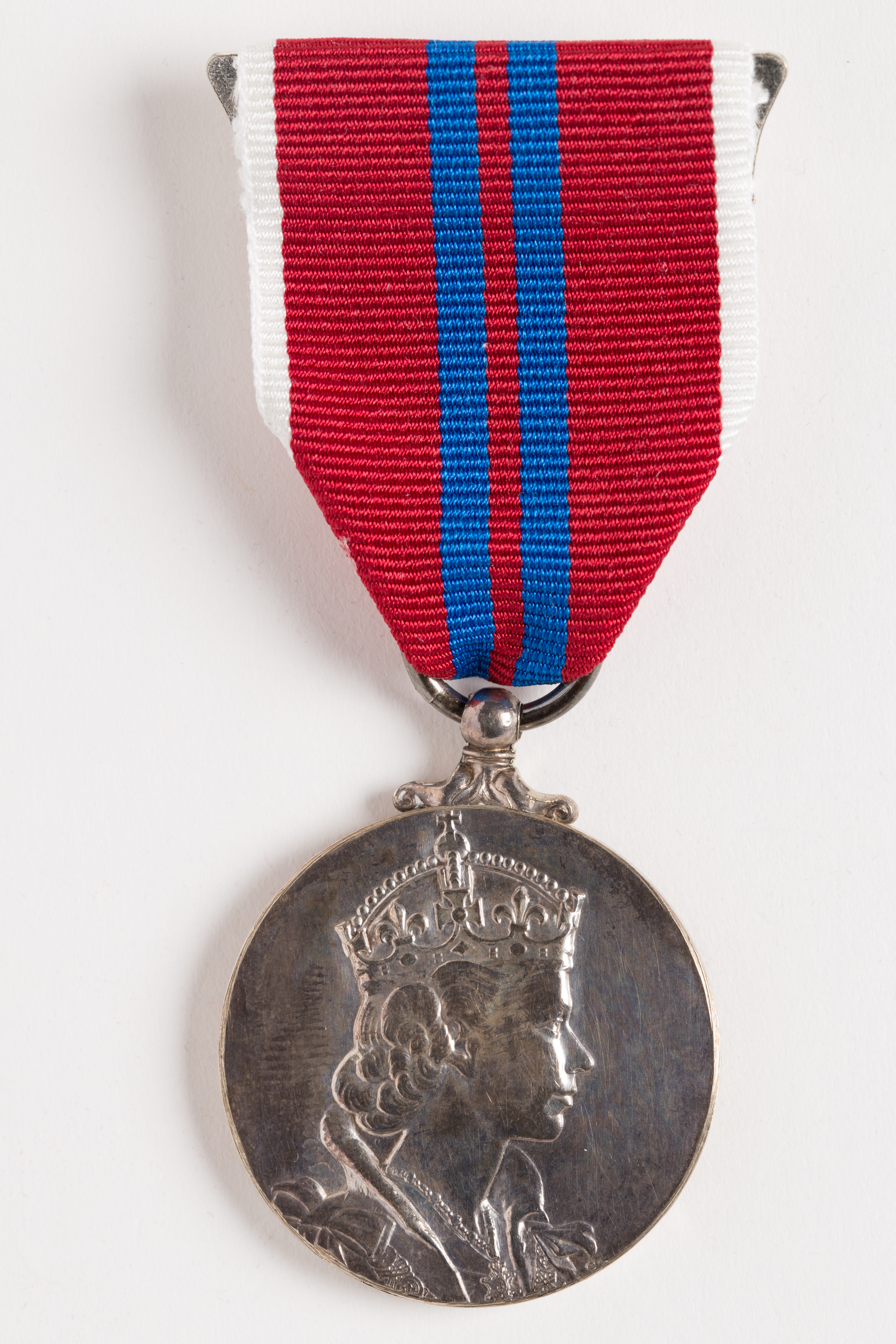
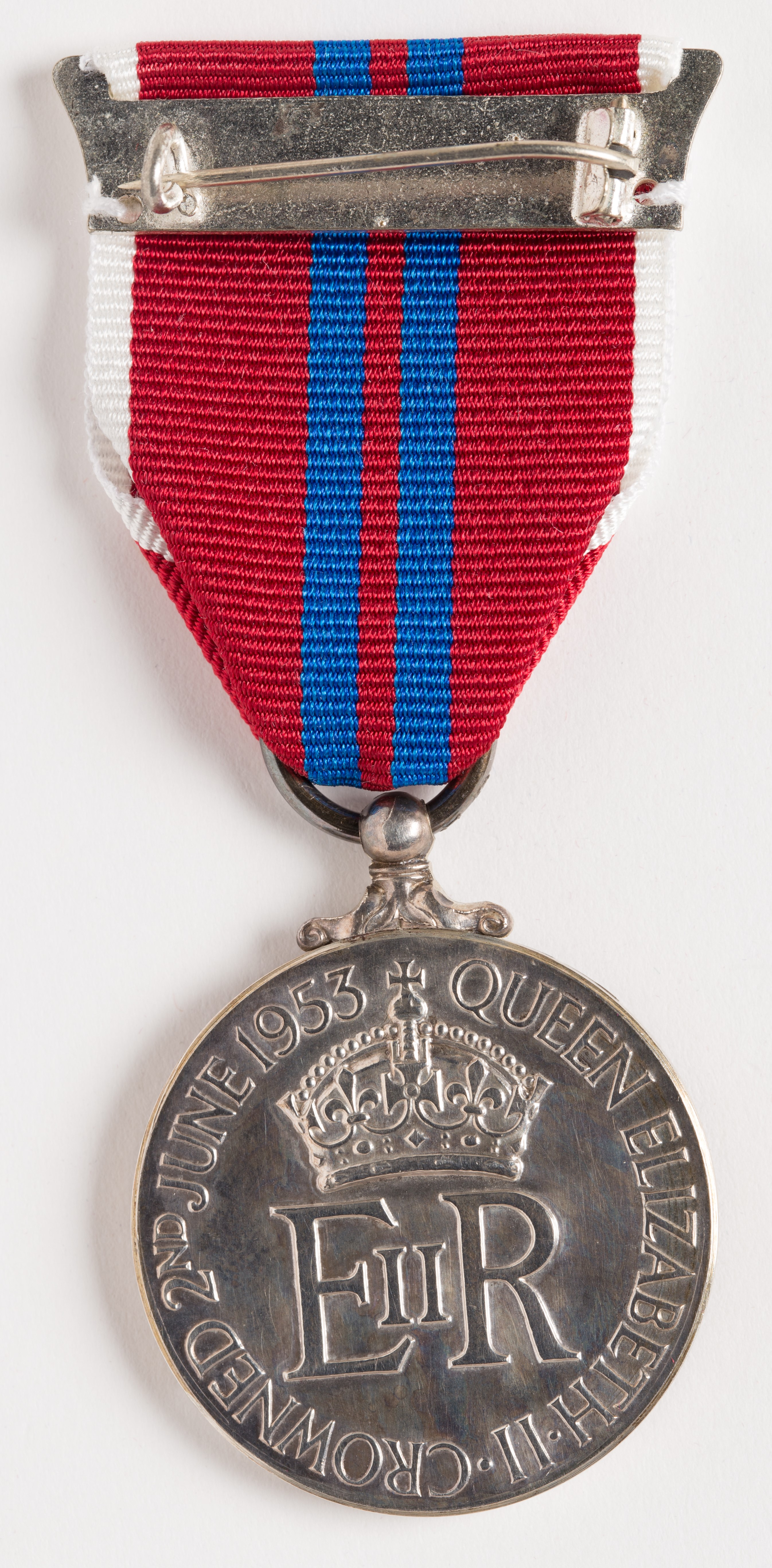
- Obverse and reverse of medal
- Type: Commemorative medal
- Awarded for: Community contribution
- Presented by: The monarch of Australia, Canada, Ceylon, New Zealand, Pakistan, South Africa, and the United Kingdom
- Eligibility: Commonwealth citizens
- Established: 2 June 1953

Highlights
- Total: 129,051
- Ribbon bar
- Related: Silver Jubilee Medal, Golden Jubilee Medal, Diamond Jubilee Medal, Platinum Jubilee Medal

The Queen Elizabeth II Coronation Medal (French: Médaille du couronnement de la Reine Élizabeth II) is a commemorative medal instituted to celebrate the coronation of Queen Elizabeth II on 2 June 1953.

== Award ==
This medal was awarded as a personal souvenir from the Queen to members of the Royal Family and selected officers of state, members of the Royal Household, government officials, mayors, public servants, local government officials, members of the navy, army, air force and police in Britain, her colonies and Dominions. It was also awarded to members of the Mount Everest expedition, two of whom reached the summit four days before the coronation. It was struck at the Royal Mint and issued immediately after the coronation.

For Coronation and Jubilee medals, the practice up until 1977 was that the authorities in the United Kingdom decided on a total number to be produced, then allocated a proportion to each of the Commonwealth countries and Crown dependencies and other possessions of the Crown. The award of the medals was then at the discretion of the government of each territory, which was left free to decide who was to be awarded a medal and why.

A total of 129,051 medals were awarded, including:

- 11,561 to Australians.
- 19,000 to Canadians.

== Description ==
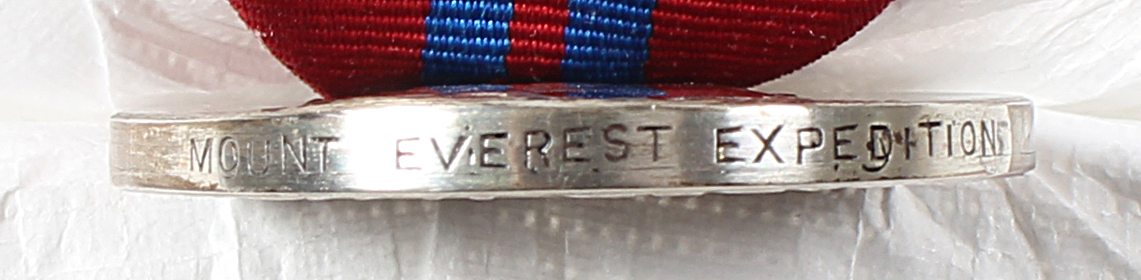
Medal with rim impressed: Mount Everest Expedition

The Queen Elizabeth II Coronation Medal is a silver disk, 1.25 inches in diameter. The obverse features a crowned effigy of Queen Elizabeth II, facing right, in a high-collared ermine cloak and wearing a Tudor Crown along with the collar of the Garter and Badge of the Bath. There is no raised rim and no legend.

The reverse shows the Royal Cypher EIIR surmounted by a large crown. The legend around the edge reads "QUEEN ELIZABETH II CROWNED 2nd JUNE 1953". The medal was designed by Cecil Thomas.

The dark red ribbon is 1.25 inches (32 mm) wide, with 5/64 inch (2 mm) wide white edges and two narrow dark blue stripes in the centre, each 5/64 inch (2 mm) wide and 1/16 inch (1.6 mm) apart.

Ladies who were awarded the Queen Elizabeth II Coronation Medal can wear it on their left shoulder with the ribbon tied in the form of a bow.

The medals were issued unnamed, except for the 37 issued to the British Mount Everest Expedition. These were engraved "MOUNT EVEREST EXPEDITION" on the rim.

== Precedence by country ==
Some orders of precedence are as follows:

Country	Preceding	Following
(Australia) Australia; Order of precedence	King George VI Coronation Medal	Queen Elizabeth II Silver Jubilee Medal
(New Zealand) New Zealand; Order of precedence	King George VI Coronation Medal	Queen Elizabeth II Silver Jubilee Medal
(Union of South Africa) South Africa; Order of precedence	Tshumelo Ikatelaho – General Service Medal	Independence Medal (Transkei)
(Dominion of Ceylon) Ceylon; Order of precedence	50th Anniversary Medals (Army) (Navy) (Air Force)	Ceylon Armed Services Long Service Medal
(United Kingdom) United Kingdom; Order of precedence	King George VI Coronation Medal	Queen Elizabeth II Silver Jubilee Medal

== Notable recipients ==
=== Australia ===
- Charles Groves Wright Anderson
- Albert Borella
- George Brain
- Frank Bladin
- Claude Champion
- Claude Choules
- Daniel Clyne
- Irene Crespin
- George Currie
- Roden Cutler
- Phillip Davey
- Alexander Duncan
- Ruth Frith
- Victor Galway
- George Gosse
- Lilian Gresham
- John Patrick Hamilton
- Charles Lloyd Jones
- Winifred Kastner
- Bill Lamb
- John Leak
- Eleanor Manning
- Pattie Menzies
- F. Kenneth Milne
- Mellis Napier
- Ada Norris
- Doris Lyne Officer
- Ian Potter
- Reg Rattey
- James Rogers
- D. Bruce Ross
- Mary Steel Stevenson
- Helen Alma Newton Turner
- Bryan Ward
- Eric Willis
- Naomi Wolinski
- James Park Woods
- Eric Woodward

=== Brunei ===
- Pengiran Anak Mohamed Alam
- Ibrahim Mohammad Jahfar

=== Ceylon ===
- Basil Henricus
- Bertram Heyn

=== India ===
- Meghrajji III of Dhrangadhra

=== Malaysia ===
- Ibrahim of Kelantan
- Yahya of Kelantan

=== Nepal ===
- Tenzing Norgay

=== New Zealand ===
The following list includes notable New Zealanders who received the Queen Elizabeth II Coronation Medal, and is not an exhaustive list of recipients.

==== A ====
- Hugh Acland
- Ernest Aderman
- Henry Ah Kew
- Robert Aitken
- Tofilau Eti Alesana
- Allen Alexander
- Ronald Algie
- Robin Allan
- Geoff Alley
- Annie Allum
- John Allum
- Claude Anaru
- Harry Anderson
- Bill Anderton
- John Andrew
- Leslie Andrew
- John Andrews
- Will Appleton
- Gilbert Archey
- Thomas Ashby
- Bernard Ashwin
- Alexander Astor

==== B ====
- Wiri Baker
- Doug Ball
- Harry Barker
- Bill Barnard
- Fred Barnard
- Jim Barnes
- Miles Barnett
- Bill Barrett
- Harold Barrowclough
- Cyril Bassett
- Eric Batchelor
- Ed Bate
- Ernest Bathurst
- Ken Baxter
- Clive Beadon
- C. E. Beeby
- Matt Benney
- Carl Berendsen
- Fred Betham
- Thyra Bethell
- William Blacklock
- Tom Bloodworth
- Denis Blundell
- Roger Blunt
- Bert Bockett
- William Bodkin
- George Bolt
- Charles Bowden
- Fred Bowerbank
- Michael Bowles
- Warwick Braithwaite
- Thomas Brash
- Cyprian Brereton
- William Bretton
- Bob Briggs
- William Bringans
- Walter Broadfoot
- Bill Brown
- Malcolm Burns
- Jim Burrows
- Peter Butler

==== C ====
- John Cairney
- Frank Callaghan
- Flora Cameron
- Dick Campbell
- Alan Candy
- Edward Caradus
- David Carnegie
- Harold Caro
- Clyde Carr
- Turi Carroll
- Ernest Caygill
- Charles Henry Chapman
- Johnny Checketts
- Hector Christie
- George Clifton
- George Clinkard
- Harry Combs
- Eric Compton
- Michael Connelly
- Phil Connolly
- Philip Cooke
- Bert Cooksley
- Ernest Corbett
- Frank Corner
- Joe Cotterill
- Charles Cotton
- Robert Coupland
- John Court
- James Crichton
- William Cunningham
- George Currie

==== D ====
- Clifford Dalton
- Joseph Darnand
- Arthur Davenport
- Alfred Davey
- Eliot Davis
- Ernest Davis
- George Davis-Goff
- Theo de Lange
- Stanley Dean
- James Deas
- Helen Deem
- Reginald Delargey
- Rangitīaria Dennan
- Edwin Dixon
- Frederick Doidge
- Viva Donaldson
- Arthur Donnelly
- Percy Dowse
- Harry Dudfield
- Roger Duff
- Mason Durie

==== E ====
- James Elliott
- Keith Elliott
- Ned Ellison
- Sam Emery
- Mary Enright
- Pat Entrican
- Dean Eyre

==== F ====
- Robert Falla
- James Fletcher
- Flora Forde
- Wilfred Fortune
- Warren Freer
- Samuel Frickleton

==== G ====
- Victor Galway
- Rua Gardner
- Thomas Garland
- Archer Garside
- William Gentry
- Jack George
- Geoff Gerard
- Theodore Nisbet Gibbs
- Esmond Gibson
- Bill Gilbert
- Frank Gill
- William Gillespie
- Alexander Gillies
- Elizabeth Gilmer
- Ron Giorgi
- William Girling
- Fred Glasse
- Stan Goosman
- Edward Gordon
- Leon Götz
- John Grace
- John Gildroy Grant
- Elizabeth Gregory
- William Gregory
- Kenneth Gresson
- Richard Gross
- William Gummer

==== H ====
- Fred Hackett
- Arthur Langan Haddon
- Rongowhakaata Halbert
- Fred Hall-Jones
- Eric Halstead
- Bill Hamilton
- Edwin Hamilton
- Reginald Hammond
- Ralph Hanan
- Frederick Hanson
- Cyril Harker
- Richard Harrison
- Ernst Hay
- James Hay
- Thomas Hayman
- Tristan Hegglun
- James Hēnare
- Charles Hercus
- Ruth Herrick
- George Herron
- Brian Hewat
- Mary St Domitille Hickey
- Allan Highet
- Edmund Hillary
- Muriel Hilton
- Jack Hinton
- Thomas Hislop
- Joe Hodgens
- Sidney Holland
- Keith Holyoake
- Tom Horton
- Mabel Howard
- Wally Hudson
- Joe Huggan
- Clive Hulme
- Henry Rainsford Hulme

==== I ====
- Leonard Isitt

==== J ====
- Allen Johnston
- Hallyburton Johnstone
- Fred Jones
- Michael Rotohiko Jones
- Sydney Jones
- Bill Jordan
- Edward Joyce
- Reginald Judson

==== K ====
- Amy Kane
- John Kavanagh
- Cyrus Kay
- Paddy Kearins
- Jim Kent
- David Campbell Kidd
- Howard Kippenberger
- Bert Kyle

==== L ====
- Robert Laidlaw
- Harry Lake
- George Laking
- Harry Laurent
- Mary Gonzaga Leahy
- Joseph Linklater
- James Liston
- Henry Livingstone
- Kitty Lovell-Smith
- George Lowe
- Tom Lowry
- Fred Lucas
- Horace Lusty
- John Luxford

==== M ====
- Ritchie Macdonald
- Tom Macdonald
- Robert Macfarlane
- Bill MacGibbon
- Duncan MacIntyre
- Clutha Mackenzie
- Charles Madden
- Margaret Magill
- Jimmy Maher
- Korokī Mahuta
- George Manning
- Gus Mansford
- Frank Mappin
- Ernest Marsden
- Jack Marshall
- Iris Martin
- Dave Mason
- Rex Mason
- Jack Massey
- John Mathison
- Rangi Mawhete
- Muriel May
- John McAlpine
- Terry McCombs
- Thomas McCormack
- Christina McDonald
- Norm McGorlick
- Alister McIntosh
- Peter McIntyre
- Peter McKeefry
- Robert McKeen
- Alex McKenzie
- Jean McKenzie
- John McKenzie
- Walter McKinnon
- Angus McLagan
- Bruce McLeod
- Ethel McMillan
- David Miller
- Harold Miller
- Alexander Moncur
- Philip Monk
- Mick Moohan
- Gordon Morrison
- Ian Morrison
- Norman Moss
- Leslie Munro
- Alfred Murdoch

==== N ====
- Walter Nash
- Edgar Neale
- Arthur Nevill
- Geoffrey Nevill
- Arnold Nordmeyer
- Willoughby Norrie
- Alfred North
- Erima Northcroft
- Charles Norwood

==== O ====
- Patrick Joseph O'Kane
- Humphrey O'Leary
- Walter Oliver
- Tiaki Omana
- Arthur Ongley
- Matthew Oram
- John Ormond
- Arthur Osborne
- Alex O'Shea
- Reginald Owen

==== P ====
- Rusty Page
- Dobbie Paikea
- Wiremu Panapa
- Ronald Park
- Charlie Peek
- Geoffrey Peren
- Arnold Perry
- William Perry
- George Petersen
- Charles Petrie
- Peter Phipps
- Ngata Pitcaithly
- Mīria Pōmare
- Lindsay Poole
- Guy Powles
- William Priest
- Īhāia Puketapu

==== Q ====
- Raymond Queree

==== R ====
- Duncan Rae
- John Rae
- Iriaka Rātana
- Neill Rattray
- Arnold Reedy
- John Reid
- Heaton Rhodes
- Eric Rich
- William Riddet
- Theodore Rigg
- Douglas Robb
- James Roberts
- Bill Rogers
- Tipi Tainui Ropiha
- Alex Ross
- Angus Ross
- Hilda Ross
- Eric Rothwell
- Eric Roussell
- Rangi Royal
- Edith Rudd

==== S ====
- Frank Sargeson
- John Saunders
- Nellie Schroder
- Tom Seddon
- Bob Semple
- Foss Shanahan
- Tom Shand
- William Sheat
- Norman Shelton
- Cliff Shirley
- Larry Siegert
- Geoffrey Sim
- Wilfrid Sim
- John Simkin
- Harry Skinner
- Jerry Skinner
- Carl Smith
- David Smith
- Sid Smith
- Douglas St George
- William George Stevens
- John Stewart
- Percy Storkey
- Duncan Stout
- Bill Sullivan
- Martin Sullivan
- Andy Sutherland

==== T ====
- Harold Tait
- Peter Tait
- Hepi Te Heuheu
- Blair Tennent
- David Thomson
- Percy Thomson
- Jim Thorn
- Edward Thorne
- Leonard Thornton
- Eruera Tirikatene
- Ernest Toop
- Geoffrey Tremaine
- Leonard Trent
- Tualaulelei Mauri
- Tupua Tamasese Meaʻole
- Harold Turbott
- George Turkington
- Fred Turley
- Charles Turner
- Patrick Twomey
- Arthur Tyndall

==== U ====
- Charles Upham

==== W ====
- Ron Wakelin
- Mark Wallace
- Robert Walls
- Fintan Patrick Walsh
- George Walsh
- John Walsh
- Bob Walton
- Joseph Ward
- Alwyn Warren
- Ellenor Watson
- James Wattie
- Jack Watts
- Clifton Webb
- John Weeks
- Stephen Weir
- George Weston
- Ronald Erle White
- William Whitlock
- Agnes, Lady Wigram
- Leonard Wild
- Lionel Wilkinson
- Gordon Wilson
- Ivon Wilson
- Joseph Vivian Wilson
- Stanley Wilson
- Frederick Wood
- George Wood
- Jack Wright
- Len Wright

=== Norway ===
- King Olav V
- Princess Astrid

=== Pakistan ===
- Azim Daudpota
- Abrar Hussain
- Amir Gulistan Janjua
- Ghulam Jilani Khan
- Władysław Turowicz

=== Samoa ===
- Tofilau Eti Alesana
- Malietoa Tanumafili II

=== Tonga ===
- Halaevalu Mataʻaho ʻAhomeʻe
- Sālote Tupou III
- Fatafehi Tuʻipelehake

=== Yugoslavia ===
- Peko Dapčević
- Milovan Đilas
- Koča Popović

== See also ==
- Queen Elizabeth II Silver Jubilee Medal
- Queen Elizabeth II Golden Jubilee Medal
- Queen Elizabeth II Diamond Jubilee Medal
- Queen Elizabeth II Platinum Jubilee Medal
