= Henry Livingstone =

New Zealand politician

Henry Gillies Livingstone OBE JP (12 September 1890 – 12 February 1959) was a New Zealand politician from Christchurch. He was appointed a member of the New Zealand Legislative Council on 22 June 1950.

== Biography ==
Born on 12 September 1890, Livingstone was the son of Thomas and Mary Ann Livingstone. He was active in the Reform Party and was an early advocate for uniting non-Labour parties into a single party.

Livingstone was appointed as a member of the "suicide squad" nominated by the First National Government in 1950 to vote for the abolition of the Council. Most of the new members (like Livingstone) were appointed on 22 June 1950, and served until 31 December 1950 when the Council was abolished.

In 1935, Livingstone was awarded the King George V Silver Jubilee Medal, and in 1953 he was awarded the Queen Elizabeth II Coronation Medal. In the 1954 Queen's Birthday Honours, he was appointed an Officer of the Order of the British Empire, for services to local government.

Livingstone died on 12 February 1959, and was buried at Waimairi Cemetery, Christchurch.
