= Victor Davies (horticulturalist) =

New Zealand nurseryman and horticulturist (1887–1977)

Sir Victor Caddy Davies OBE JP (3 May 1887 – 26 March 1977) was a New Zealand nurseryman and horticulturist. He was born in New Plymouth, New Zealand, on 3 May 1887.

In the 1954 Queen's Birthday Honours, Davies was appointed an Officer of the Order of the British Empire, for services to horticulture. In 1968 he was awarded the Loder Cup. He was made a Knight Bachelor in the 1977 New Year Honours, also for service to horticulture.
