= Theodore Nisbet Gibbs =

New Zealand law clerk, accountant, and businessman

Theodore Nisbet Gibbs (3 February 1896–15 July 1978) was a New Zealand law clerk, accountant, businessman and tax adviser. He was born in Whangaroa, Northland, New Zealand on 3 February 1896.

In 1953, Gibbs was awarded the Queen Elizabeth II Coronation Medal.
