= Flora Cameron =

New Zealand nurse, nursing instructor and administrator

Flora Jean Cameron OBE OStJ (24 December 1902 – 13 January 1966) was a New Zealand nurse, nursing instructor and administrator.

== Biography ==
Cameron was born in Richmond, New Zealand, on 24 December 1902. She did her nursing training at Christchurch Hospital, achieving her nursing registration in 1929.

After some private nursing work in Lower Hutt and Wanganui she began maternity training in Blenheim at Holmdale Hospital. She did her midwifery training at the Auckland St Helens Hospital in 1932 and was then appointed a sister at St Helens Hospital in Wellington. She completed the Post-graduate Course in Nursing in Wellington in 1934 before taking on a position as public health nurse in Wanganui for four years. Within the Department of Health her organising abilities were recognised by the Director of Nursing, Mary Lambie, and she was promoted rapidly.

In receipt of a Rockefeller Foundation study fellowship Cameron spent a year in 1938-1939 in Canada, the US, England and Scotland where she looked at health services, public health and hospital administration. She attained a Diploma in Hospital Social Work from Toronto University. Returning to New Zealand she was Nurse Instructor at the Post-graduate school for Nurses in Wellington. She taught public health and medical social work. She and other tutors from the nursing school promoted a new curriculum for nursing training in 1955-1956; the new curriculum which was implemented in 1957 added maternity nursing to the general nurse training.

In 1949 Cameron became Deputy Director of Nursing in the Department of Health. She became Director of Nursing in 1950 and an advocate of public health nursing, nursing education and nursing services.

Cameron also held international positions. She was elected to the Nursing Education Committee of the International Council of Nurses in 1957, becoming its Chairman in 1961; she served on the committee for eight years. In 1965 she was elected onto the Board of Directors of the International Council of Nurses.

Cameron died in Lower Hutt in 1966.

== Honours and awards ==
Cameron was awarded the Queen Elizabeth II Coronation Medal in 1953, appointed an Officer of the Order of the British Empire in the 1954 Queen's Birthday Honours, and received the Florence Nightingale Medal from the International Committee of the Red Cross in 1959. The following year she was made an Officer of the Order of St John.

The New Zealand Nurses Organisation's Nursing Education and Research Foundation was set up in 1968 with donations made in Cameron's memory. It provides scholarships and grants to students, midwives and nurses.
