= Jack Newman (New Zealand cricketer) =

New Zealand cricketer

Sir Jack Newman CBE
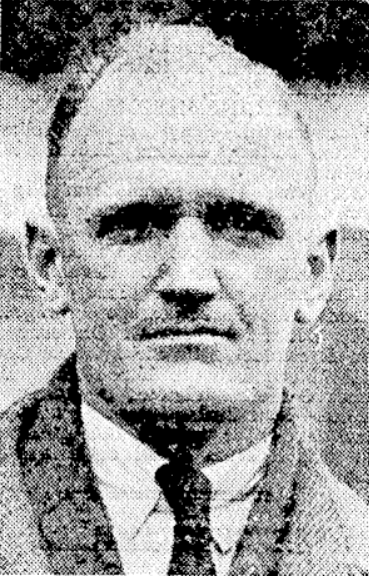
- Newman in 1933

Personal information
- Born: 3 July 1902; Brightwater, New Zealand
- Died: 23 September 1996 (aged 94); Nelson, New Zealand
- Batting: Right-handed
- Bowling: Left-arm medium

International information
- National side: New Zealand (1932–1933)
- Test debut (cap 22): 1 March 1932 v South Africa
- Last Test: 31 March 1933 v England

Career statistics
Competition	Test	First-class
Matches	3	17
Runs scored	33	206
Batting average	8.25	8.95
100s/50s	0/0	0/0
Top score	19	22*
Balls bowled	425	4,474
Wickets	2	69
Bowling average	127.00	24.76
5 wickets in innings	0	2
10 wickets in match	0	1
Best bowling	2/76	5/45
Catches/stumpings	0/–	6/–
- Source: Cricinfo, 1 April 2017

Sir Jack Newman CBE (3 July 1902 – 23 September 1996) was a New Zealand cricketer and business executive.

== Biography ==
Newman was born at Brightwater, near Nelson in 1902. He attended Nelson College from 1917 to 1920.

== Cricket career ==
As a cricketer, Newman earned three Test caps in 1932 and 1933 as a left-arm medium-pace bowler. He played one match of first-class cricket for Canterbury in 1923, and 13 for Wellington between 1930 and 1935. His best first-class bowling figures were 5 for 51 and 5 for 45 for Wellington against Otago in 1931–32, immediately after being selected for his first Test match.

He played Hawke Cup cricket for Nelson from 1922 to 1948. He played his last game for Nelson at the age of 53. He was a Test selector from 1958 to 1963, and president of the New Zealand Cricket Council from 1964 to 1967.

== Other sports ==
Newman was also an accomplished rugby player.

== Beyond sports ==
Away from sport, Newman was an executive in his family's transportation business, which is now the TNL Group, retiring as chairman in 1980. In retirement he founded the air charter company Newmans Air which merged with Ansett New Zealand in 1986.

In the 1963 Queen's Birthday Honours, Newman was made a Commander of the Order of the British Empire, for services to tourism in New Zealand. He was appointed a Knight Bachelor, for services to the travel industry, commerce and the community, in the 1977 Queen's Silver Jubilee and Birthday Honours. In 1994, Newman was inducted into the New Zealand Business Hall of Fame.

Newman died in Nelson in 1996.

Preceded by Bob Wyatt	Oldest Living Test Cricketer; 20 April 1995 – 23 September 1996	Succeeded by Lionel Birkett
