= Stanley Dean =

Manager of the New Zealand national rugby union team

Stanley Dean OBE
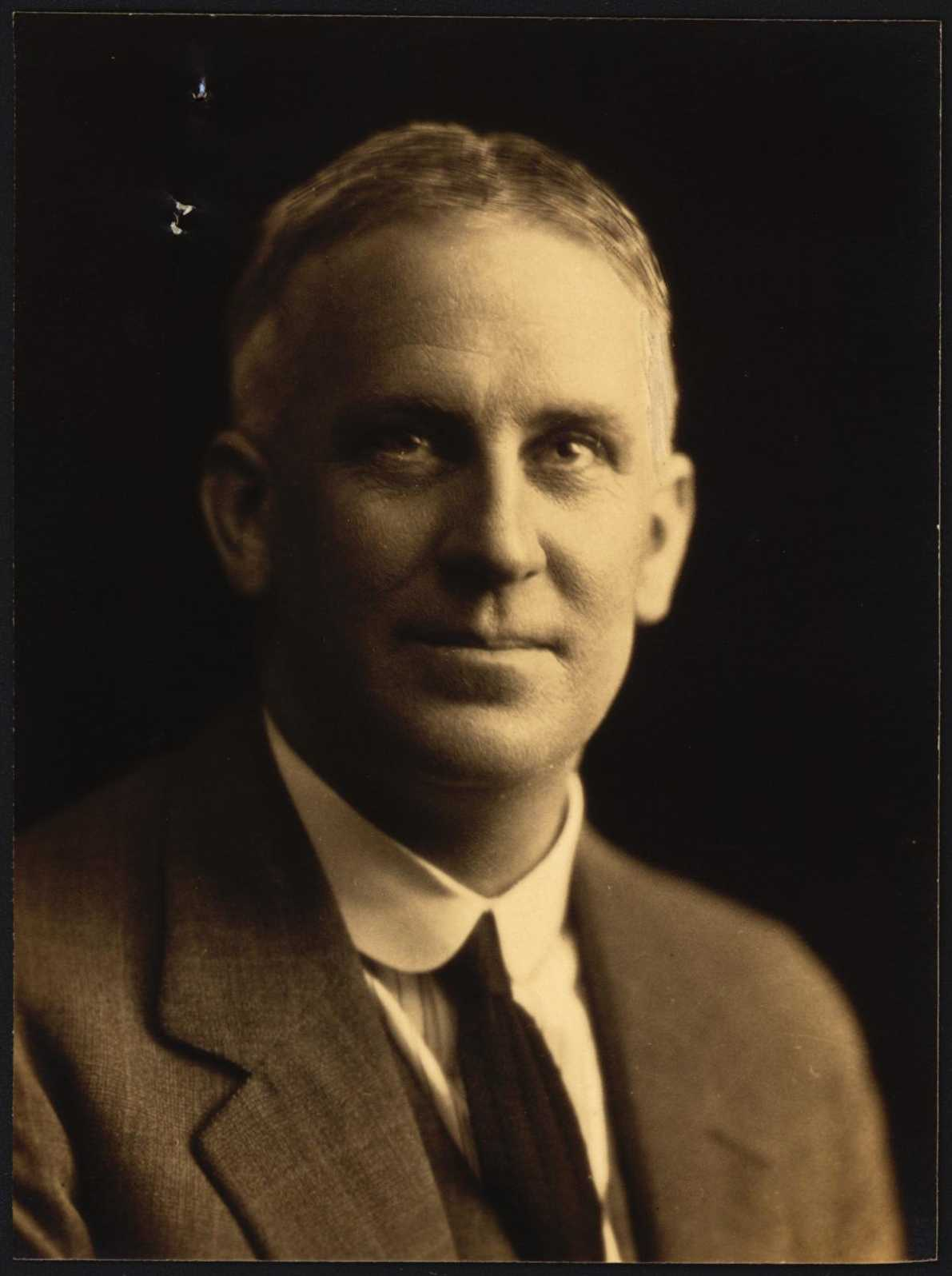
- Dean in 1924
- Born: Stanley Sydney McPherson Dean; 8 March 1887; Auckland, New Zealand
- Died: 17 March 1971 (aged 84); Wellington, New Zealand
- Occupation: Company manager
- Known for: Manager of 1924–1925 All Blacks Invincibles

Stanley Sydney McPherson Dean OBE (8 March 1887 – 17 March 1971) was the manager of the New Zealand national rugby union team on their tour of Australia in 1922 and the 'Invincibles' of 1924–1925 who went unbeaten on their tour of Britain, Ireland and France. He later managed the New Zealand Maori team in Fiji 1938.

Dean was born in Auckland in 1887, the son of Edward Dean. He received his education at Auckland Grammar School and was the Wellington manager of the South British Insurance Company Ltd from 1919 to 1949.

He stood for a seat on the Wellington City Council at a 1949 by-election as an independent candidate, but was unsuccessful. At the 1950 election he stood for the council again, this time as a candidate on the Citizens' Association ticket, but was again unsuccessful.

In the 1951 New Years Honours, Dean was appointed an Officer of the Order of the British Empire, in recognition of his service as chairman of the Fire Boards Association of New Zealand. In 1953, he was awarded the Queen Elizabeth II Coronation Medal.

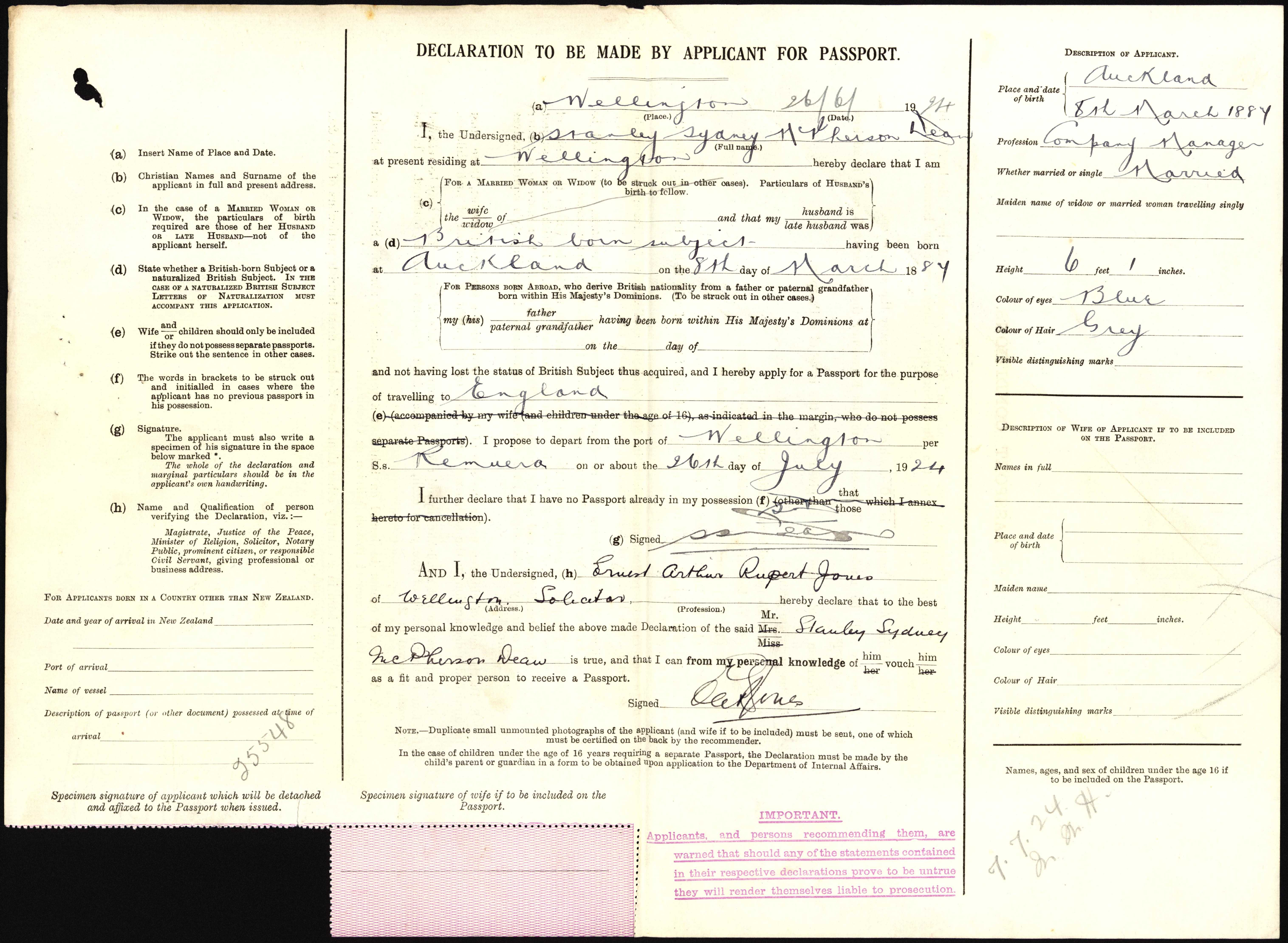
Stanley Sydney McPherson Dean passport application (1924)
