= Carl Smith (businessman) =

New Zealand businessman (1897–1979)

Sir Carl Smith CBE
- Born: Carl Victor Smith; 19 April 1897; Edinburgh, Scotland
- Died: 12 February 1979 (aged 81); Dunedin, New Zealand
- Occupation: Businessman
- Known for: Chairman of Cadbury Fry Hudson
- Spouse: Catherine Elizabeth Gettings Johnston (m. 1919)

Sir Carl Victor Smith CBE (19 April 1897 – 12 February 1979) was a New Zealand businessman, based in Dunedin. He was chairman of confectionery and biscuit company Cadbury Fry Hudson from 1938 until his retirement in 1963.

Smith served as president of the New Zealand Manufacturers' Federation and was a member of the Economic Stabilisation Commission during World War II. In the 1946 King's Birthday Honours, he was appointed a Commander of the Order of the British Empire in recognition of both those roles. In 1953, Smith was awarded the Queen Elizabeth II Coronation Medal. He was made a Knight Bachelor, for public services, in the 1964 Queen's Birthday Honours.

In 1968, Smith wrote a centennial history of Cadbury Fry Hudson, titled Sweet Success.

A member of the University of Otago Council, and the founder of the Rowheath Trust, which supports the work of the university, Smith was awarded an honorary LLD by the University of Otago in 1968.

Smith died in Dunedin on 12 February 1979.
