= 1951 New Year Honours (New Zealand) =

Annual awards for New Zealanders

The 1951 New Year Honours in New Zealand were appointments by King George VI on the advice of the New Zealand government to various orders and honours to reward and highlight good works by New Zealanders. The awards celebrated the passing of 1950 and the beginning of 1951, and were announced on 1 January 1951.

The recipients of honours are displayed here as they were styled before their new honour.

== Knight Bachelor ==
- Thomas Andrew Duncan – of Otairi, Hunterville. For public services, especially in connection with farming.

== Order of the Bath ==
=== Companion (CB) ===
Military division

- Air Commodore Sidney Wallingford CBE – Royal New Zealand Air Force.

== Order of the British Empire ==
=== Knight Commander (KBE) ===
Civil division

- Wilfrid Joseph Sim MC KC – of Wellington. For public services.
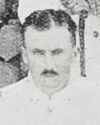
Sir Wilfrid Sim

=== Commander (CBE) ===
Civil division

- Thomas Cuddie Brash – of Wellington. For services to the dairy and fruit growing industries.
- James Alfred Nash – of Palmerston North. For public and municipal services.
- Charles Anderson Wilkinson MP – of Eltham. For public services.

Military division

- Commander (S) (Acting Captain (S)) Guy Tregarthen Millett – Royal Navy.
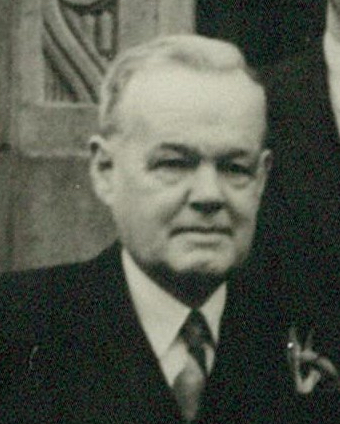
Thomas Brash

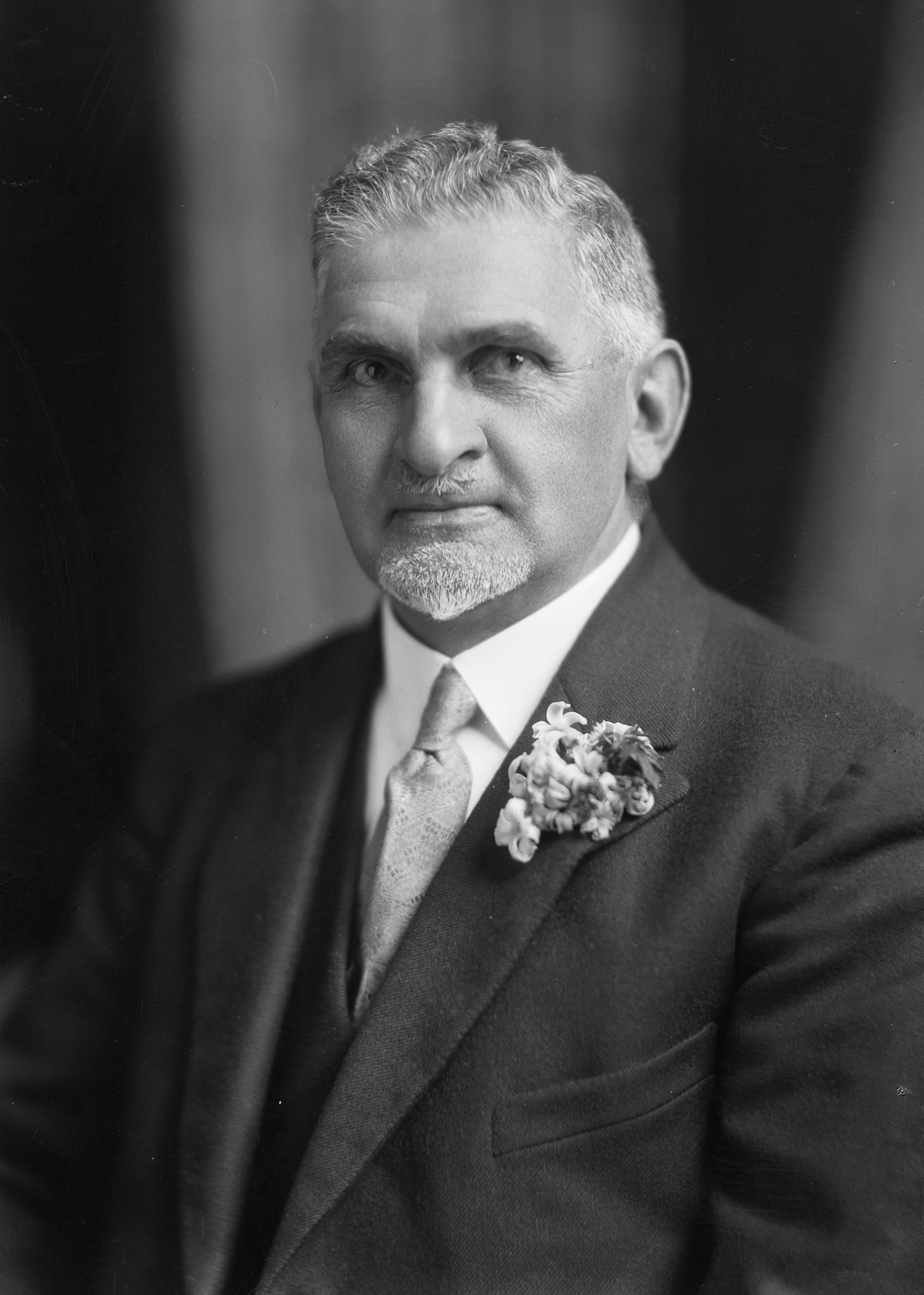
James Nash

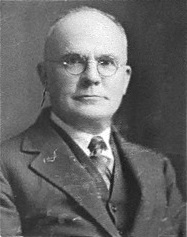
Charles Wilkinson

=== Officer (OBE) ===
Civil division

- Arthur Barnett – of Dunedin. For patriotic and philanthropic services.
- Stanley Sydney McPherson Dean – of Wellington; chairman, Fire Boards Association of New Zealand.
- Thomas Gilray MB ChB – of Napier; a medical practitioner.
- Amy Grace Kane – of Wellington. For social welfare services, especially in connection with women's organisations.
- Alexander Cameron McKillop MB ChB – of Christchurch. For services to psychiatry.
- Robert James Mills – of Auckland. For services to local government.
- The Reverend Eruera Te Tuhi – Methodist Māori Mission, Auckland.
- Muriel Grace Widdowson – matron, public hospital, Christchurch.
- Montague Harrison Wynyard – of Onehunga. For services as a member of local bodies.

Military division

- Lieutenant-Colonel Archibald Russell Currie DSO – Royal New Zealand Engineers.
- Wing Commander Alfred Morton Seafield Manhire – Royal New Zealand Air Force.

=== Member (MBE) ===
Civil division

- Fredrick Joseph Ballinger – of the Volunteer Fire Police, Wellington.
- Arthur George Doyly Bayfield – of Wellington. For services to sport.
- Felix Templeman Bellringer – of New Plymouth. For services to local government.
- Madeline Gertrude Brown – of Fendalton. For services to ex-servicemen.
- George Dash – of Waimate. For services to local government.
- Ethel Marianne Gibson – of Christchurch. For services to education.
- Frank Eggar Greenish – of Wellington. For services to architecture.
- James Robert Hardie – of Palmerston North. For services to local government.
- Annie Jane Lyall Henderson – of Invercargill. For social welfare services, especially to the Southland Hospital Board.
- Henrietta Mabel Jackson – of Kōpuaranga. For services to the Women's Division, Federated Farmers.
- James Angus Sutherland Mackay – of Whangārei. For services to local government.
- Thomas Mathew McAhan – of Abbotsford, Green Island. For services to local government.
- Alan Mitchell – of London, England. For services to journalism.
- Cecil Rex Moore – of Auckland. For services to sport.
- Florence Myrtle Neale. For public services in Nelson.
- Sophie Albertha Dupree Rickerby – of Auckland. For social welfare and patriotic services.
- Louis Joseph Vangioni – of Akaroa. For services to Māori ethnology and the community generally.

Military division

- Lieutenant-Commander Norman Huia Hope – Royal New Zealand Naval Volunteer Reserve.
- Roy Ernest Ansley – senior commissioned gunner (TAS), Royal New Zealand Navy.
- Major (temporary) Leslie Frederick Brooker – Royal New Zealand Armoured Corps.
- Warrant Officer Class I (temporary) Norman Sigurd Pedersen – Royal New Zealand Corps of Signals.
- Warrant Officer Andrew Phillip Henry Lee – Royal New Zealand Air Force.
- Warrant Officer William Stanley Smith – Royal New Zealand Air Force.
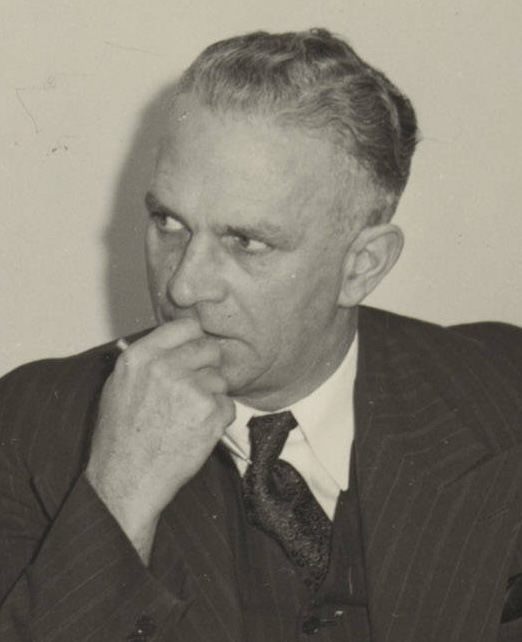
Rex Moore

== British Empire Medal (BEM) ==
Military division

- Chief Petty Officer (R) Gordon Keith Alexander – Royal New Zealand Naval Volunteer Reserve.
- Chief Wren, First Class, Dorothy Pinson – Women's Royal New Zealand Naval Service.
- Chief Electrician John Wyber Jones – Royal New Zealand Navy.
- Sergeant Albert John Lark MM – New Zealand Regiment.
- Warrant Officer Class II (temporary) James Hutcheon Swann – Royal New Zealand Army Medical Corps.
- Flight Sergeant (now Acting Warrant Officer) Donald James Tibbie Pryor – Royal New Zealand Air Force.

== Air Force Cross (AFC) ==
- Flight Lieutenant James Patrick O'Donnell – Royal New Zealand Air Force.
- Flight Lieutenant John Nigel Trolove – Royal New Zealand Air Force.

== Air Force Medal (AFM) ==
- Pilot 1 Reginald Arthur Geoffrey Plane – Royal New Zealand Air Force.

== King's Commendation for Valuable Service in the Air ==
- Allan Marcus Pritchard – chief pilot, Ministry of Works; of Wellington,
- Captain Christopher Griffiths – Tasman Empire Airways; of Auckland.
