= Eric Rich =

Anglican bishop in New Zealand

Eric John Rich (1894–1972) was an Anglican bishop in New Zealand. He was born 8 February 1894 in Vila Rica, Paraguay, South America to John Rich (1862–1939) and Esther Maria Barrett (1868–1948).

Rich was educated at the University of New Zealand and ordained in 1920. After a curacy in Wellington he held incumbencies at Berhampore, Taihape and Masterton. He was Archdeacon of Wairarapa from 1940 to 1945, Archdeacon of Wellington from 1945 to 1961; Vicar general of the Diocese of Wellington from 1947 to 1961; and Assistant Bishop to the Primate of New Zealand from his consecration, 28 October 1952, to his retirement, 31 March 1961.

In 1953, Rich was awarded the Queen Elizabeth II Coronation Medal.

Rich married Ivy Anne Charles (1906–2001) on 4 August 1934. He died 9 April 1972 in Wellington, New Zealand.
