= Naomi Wolinski =

Australian sports administrator

Naomi Herman Wolinski, MBE (26 March 1881, in Bendigo, Victoria, Australia – 14 September 1969, in Sydney, Australia) was an Australian sports activist/administrator, who organised fundraising and the production of clothing for servicemen during World War II.

The daughter of a Polish-born rabbi, Solomon Herman, she and her husband took up lawn bowls in the late 1920s, playing at the Wollstonecraft Bowling Club. Wolinski died in 1969, aged 88, in Sydney.

== Awards and recognition ==
In 1953, Wolinski was awarded the Queen Elizabeth II Coronation Medal. She was appointed Member of the Order of the British Empire (MBE) for services to women's sport in the 1960 New Year Honours. In 2011, Wolinski was posthumously inducted into the Bowls' Australia Hall of Fame.

== Sources ==
- She's Game: Women Making Australian Sporting History, Australian Women's Archives Project, 2007
