= 1963 Birthday Honours (New Zealand) =

Awards list for New Zealand

The 1963 Queen's Birthday Honours in New Zealand, celebrating the official birthday of Elizabeth II, were appointments made by the Queen on the advice of the New Zealand government to various orders and honours to reward and highlight good works by New Zealanders. They were announced on 8 June 1963.

The recipients of honours are displayed here as they were styled before their new honour.

== Knight Bachelor ==
- Gilbert Edward Archey CBE – director of the Auckland Institute and Museum.
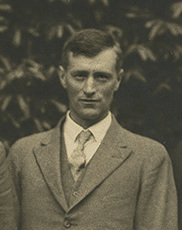
Sir Gilbert Archey

== Order of Saint Michael and Saint George ==
=== Companion (CMG) ===
- Arthur Egbert Davenport – lately general manager of the New Zealand Electricity Department.
- William Percy Gowland MD FRCS – of Nelson; professor emeritus of anatomy, University of Otago.

== Order of the British Empire ==
=== Knight Commander (KBE) ===
Civil division

- John Andrew CBE – of Hyde. For public services.

=== Commander (CBE) ===
Civil division

- Herbert Myer Caselberg – of Wellington. For services to land settlement and agriculture.
- James Deans JP – of Canterbury. For services to local government, agriculture and forestry.
- Alexander McGregor Grant MB FRACS – of Auckland. For services to medicine and racing.
- Jack Newman JP – of Nelson. For services to tourism in New Zealand.

Military division

- Air Commodore William Hector Stratton DFC – Royal New Zealand Air Force.

=== Officer (OBE) ===
Civil division

- Leonard Frederick de Berry – of Christchurch. For services to music and education.
- Alec Sugden Farrar. For services to the community, especially as president of the Christchurch Returned Services' Association.
- Harold Robert Holt – president of the Hawke's Bay and East Coast Art Society.
- Colin Robert Horsley – concert pianist. For services to music.
- Leonard James Tobin Ireland JP – of Dunedin. For services to local-body administration.
- Hamana Mahuika – of Tikitiki. For services to the Māori people.
- Leyon Miall Moss – chairman of the New Plymouth High School board.
- Leslie Walter Stewart – formerly rector of St Andrew's College, Christchurch.
- John Tait – of Invercargill. For services to local government and the Returned Services' Association.
- Ellenor Catherine Watson – Dominion president of the Women's Division of the Federated Farmers.

Military division

- Surgeon Commander (D) Alexander Colin Horne BDS LDS – Royal New Zealand Navy.
- Lieutenant-Colonel John Wallace Bateman MM ED – 1st Divisional Signals Regiment (Territorial Force).
- Group Captain Arthur Percy Gainsford DSO DFC AFC – Royal New Zealand Air Force.

=== Member (MBE) ===
Civil division

- Prudens Lillian Burrowes Blunden – of Waikari. For social-welfare services.
- Edward James Bradshaw JP – a former mayor of Riccarton.
- Nora Kathleen Braithwaite – of Hamilton. For services to the community.
- Gordon Leonard Brown – of Auckland. For services with the St John Ambulance movement.
- William Alexander Gault – of Ōpōtiki. For services to local government.
- Wilfred Douglas Gorman – of Wellington. For services to the community, especially in connection with the Amateur Radio Emergency Corps (Search and Rescue Organisation).
- Jessie Jackson – a librarian at Her Majesty's New Zealand Dockyard in Auckland.
- Mavis Gwendolen Kealy – of Auckland. For services to local government and social welfare.
- Alfred Sydney Kinsman – of Timaru. For services to local government.
- Robert McCallum – major, Salvation Army, Rotoroa Island, Auckland.
- Archibald Aloysius McDonald – of Ashburton. For services to local government.
- Mary Ellen Reid – of Greymouth. For social-welfare services, especially in connection with women and children.
- Wilfrid Aaron Rushton JP – mayor of Morrinsville.
- Gladys Anne Sandford – matron of the Lower Hutt Maternity Annexe.
- Willis Alan Scaife JP – of Wānaka. For services to farming.
- Harold Reginald Street – of Taumarunui. For services to local government.
- Herbert Lea Towers – of Auckland. For services to athletics, especially in connection with the New Zealand Olympic and British Empire Games Association.
- Ronald Philip Wakelin ED JP – mayor of Carterton.
- Gwendoline Edna Borrie Wilson – matron of Ashburn Hall, Dunedin.

Military division

- Lieutenant Commander (SP) (temporary) Peter Maxwell Sanders – Royal New Zealand Naval Volunteer Reserve.
- Major Frederick Arthur Gunn ED – New Zealand Regiment (Regular Force).
- Warrant Officer Class II Ronald Ivan Keat – New Zealand Regiment (Regular Force).
- Honorary Captain Frederick Barry Smyth ED – Royal Regiment of New Zealand Artillery (Territorial Force).
- Major Richard Stanley-Harris – New Zealand Regiment (Regular Force).
- Squadron Officer Joyce Eileen Peat – Women's Royal New Zealand Air Force.
- Warrant Officer Herbert Edwards – Royal New Zealand Air Force.

== Companion of the Imperial Service Order (ISO) ==
- Charles Edward Peek – superintendent, Child Welfare Division, Department of Education.
- Charles William Oakey Turner – lately engineer-in-chief, Public Works Department.

== British Empire Medal (BEM) ==
Civil division, for gallantry

- Raymond Piper – ambulance driver, Auckland. For courage at the time of a shooting tragedy in the Auckland district.
- Joseph Walker – constable, New Zealand Police, Auckland. For courage at the time of a shooting tragedy in the Auckland district.

Civil division

- Edward Fitzgerald Barry – constable, New Zealand Police, Auckland.

Military division

- Shipwright Artificer 1st Class Oliver Maxwell Cox – Royal New Zealand Navy.
- Chief Radio Electrical Artificer Cyril Neil Jeffries – Royal New Zealand Navy.
- Chief Petty Officer Gordon Thomas Lawrence – Royal New Zealand Navy.
- Chief Radio Electrician Kenneth Robinson – Royal New Zealand Navy.
- Staff-Sergeant Clifford Melrose Kennedy – New Zealand Regiment (Regular Force).
- Staff-Sergeant Gavin Stanley Milne – Royal New Zealand Engineers (Territorial Force).
- Warrant Officer Class II (temporary) John O'Brien – Royal New Zealand Signals (Regular Force).
- Sergeant Geoffrey Millard Castle – Royal New Zealand Air Force.
- Sergeant Edward Sims – Royal New Zealand Air Force.

== Air Force Cross (AFC) ==
- Squadron Leader Donald Benjamin Pollard – Royal New Zealand Air Force.
- Flight Lieutenant Arthur David Malcolm Winkelmann – Royal New Zealand Air Force.

== Queen's Police Medal (QPM) ==
- Charles Edward Tanner – chief inspector, New Zealand Police.

== Queen's Commendation for Valuable Service in the Air ==
- Flight Lieutenant Frederick Barry Flavall – Royal New Zealand Air Force.
