= Ellenor Watson =

New Zealand rural women's advocate and community leader

Ellenor Catherine Watson OBE (née Squires, 22 April 1907 – 24 June 1966) was a notable New Zealand rural women's advocate and community leader. She was born in Nelson, New Zealand, in 1907.

In 1953, Watson was awarded the Queen Elizabeth II Coronation Medal. In the 1963 Queen's Birthday Honours, she was appointed an Officer of the Order of the British Empire, in recognition of her service as national president of Women's Division of Federated Farmers.
