= 1954 Birthday Honours (New Zealand) =

Award list for New Zealand

The 1954 Queen's Birthday Honours in New Zealand, celebrating the official birthday of Elizabeth II, were appointments made by the Queen on the advice of the New Zealand government to various orders and honours to reward and highlight good works by New Zealanders. They were announced on 10 June 1954.

The recipients of honours are displayed here as they were styled before their new honour.

== Knight Bachelor ==
- David Henry – chairman and managing director, New Zealand Forest Products Limited.
- John Sutherland Ross CMG – of Dunedin, company director. For public services.
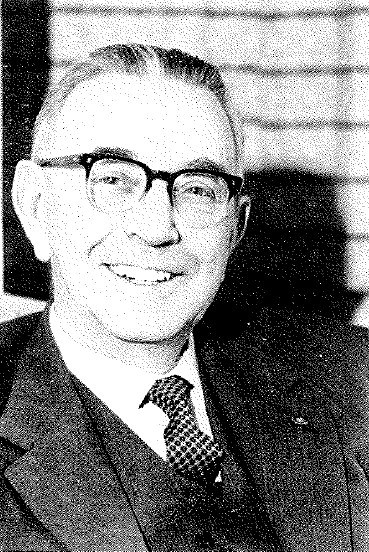
Sir David Henry

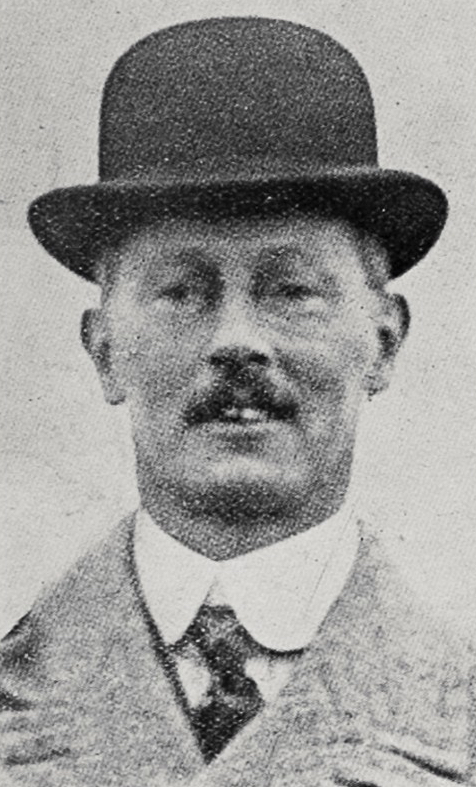
Sir John Ross

== Order of the Bath ==
=== Companion (CB) ===
Military division

- Major-General William George Gentry CBE DSO – Chief of the New Zealand General Staff.

== Order of Saint Michael and Saint George ==
=== Companion (CMG) ===
- Edward Coldham Fussell – governor of the Reserve Bank of New Zealand.
- Robert Mafeking Macfarlane JP – mayor of Christchurch.
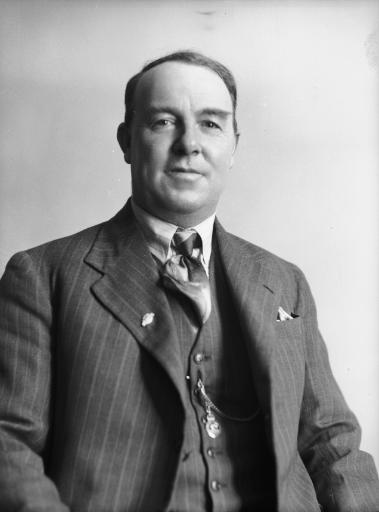
Robert Macfarlane

== Order of the British Empire ==
=== Commander (CBE) ===
Civil division

- John Grierson – chairman, Auckland Hospital Board, and a director of the Bank of New Zealand.
- Arthur Grant Harper CVO JP – Secretary for Internal Affairs.
- The Very Reverend David Craig Herron MC – chancellor of the University of Otago.
- Philip Patrick Lynch MD FRACP – of Wellington; a prominent pathologist.
- William Yates – Director of Broadcasting.

Military division

- Group Captain Reginald William Kennedy Stevens – Royal New Zealand Air Force.
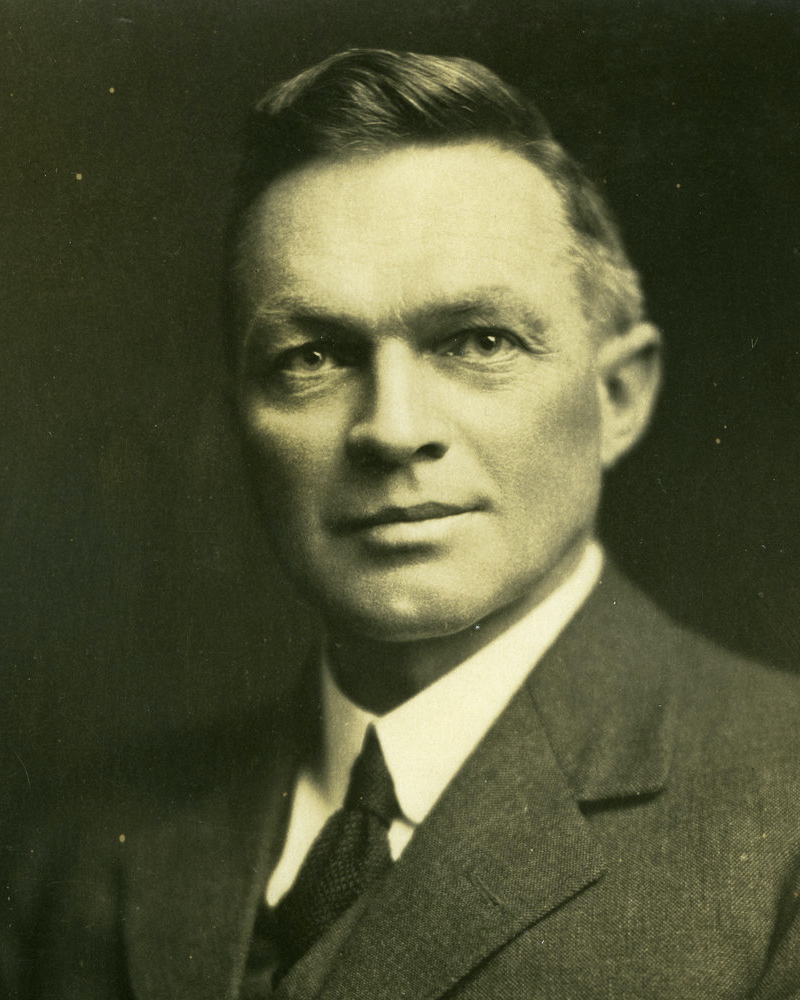
David Herron

=== Officer (OBE) ===
Civil division

- Captain Leslie Cecil Boulton – MV Maui Pomare, Island Territories Department.
- Flora Jean Cameron – Director of the Nursing Division, Department of Health.
- Michael Francis Edward Cooney – mayor of Oamaru.
- Victor Caddy Davies – of New Plymouth. For services to horticulture.
- Henry Gillies Livingstone JP – of Christchurch. For services to local government.
- Claude James Lovegrove – president, Electrical Supply Authorities' Association of New Zealand.
- Charles Isaac Nathan – chairman, Board of Trustees, New Zealand Institute for the Blind.

Military division

- Commander Humphrey Leoline Jenkins DSC – Royal Navy (on loan to the Royal New Zealand Navy).
- Lieutenant-Colonel William Alfred Thomas McGuire ED – New Zealand Territorial Force.
- The Reverend Arthur Russell Allerton MC – Royal New Zealand Air Force.

=== Member (MBE) ===
Civil division

- Colonel Maxwell Aldred VD – of Waiuku. For public services.
- James Edwin Benson JP – of Gisborne. For services to local government.
- Edith Mary Winstone Blackwell – of Auckland. For social welfare and philanthropic services.
- Ernest Israel Crossman – of Inglewood. For services to the community, especially in connection with St John's Ambulance Association and volunteer fire brigade work.
- Kenneth Waring Dalrymple – chairman, Rangitikei County Council.
- Henry Charles James Gimblett – clerk of the Southland County Council.
- Francis Mortimer Howell Sr. – of Central Otago. For services to the community.
- Stanley James Judd. For services to Pahiatua Borough Council.
- Helen Louisa Mason – of Matamata. For services rendered in connection with patriotic and social welfare movements.
- Arthur Joseph McEldowney JP – of Christchurch. For services to the community.
- Ivy McIntosh – of Invercargill. For public services.
- Maraea Ngarimu. For social welfare services to the Māori people in the East Coast area.
- Alfred Gordon Nolan – chairman, Wairoa County Council.
- Nora Martha Ross JP – of Dunedin. For services to the community.
- William Prentice Sommerville JP – of Wellington. For voluntary services to orphanages and other charitable organisations.
- Rawiri Pehiatea Tatana. For services to the Māori people as an elder and leader of the Ngāti Toa and Ngāti Raukawa tribes.
- John Mark Totich – of Auckland. For social welfare services.
- Mary Herbert Tripp – of Christchurch. For services rendered in connection with patriotic movements.
- Florence Christina Waters – of Hamilton. For social welfare services, especially in connection with the Red Cross and other charitable organisations.
- Edward Rogers Webb – bursar of Christ's College for many years.
- Nancy Wilson. For services as New Zealand Commissioner for Cubs and to scouting.
- Charles Alexander Woolley – superintendent, Wellington City Fire Brigade.

Military division

- Senior Commissioned Gunner Ernest Francis Standley DSM – Royal Navy (on loan to the Royal New Zealand Navy).
- Captain (temporary) James Conway Brown – Royal New Zealand Artillery. In recognition of services in Korea during the period 28 July 1953 to 31 January 1954.
- Captain Frederick Robert Charles Penn – New Zealand Territorial Force.
- Warrant Officer Second Class George Te Hou – New Zealand Territorial Force.
- Captain and Quartermaster Arthur Wainwright – Supernumerary List, New Zealand Regular Force.
- Flight Lieutenant George Thomas Beban – Royal New Zealand Air Force.
- Flight Lieutenant Bernard Ian Frederick Hall – Royal New Zealand Air Force.

== Companion of the Imperial Service Order (ISO) ==
- Ernest Claude Adams – lately Registrar-General of Lands and District Land Registrar.
- Cyril Gilbert Reeves McKay – senior New Zealand commissioner, South Pacific Commission; formerly Secretary of Island Territories.

== British Empire Medal (BEM) ==
Military division

- Chief Electrical Artificer John Percival Badger – Royal New Zealand Navy.
- Sick Berth Chief Petty Officer Walter Blake – Royal New Zealand Navy.
- Chief Petty Officer Steward Robert George Coley – Royal New Zealand Navy.
- Chief Petty Officer Allen William Gray – Royal New Zealand Navy.
- Chief Petty Officer Telegraphist Reginald Albert Haynes – Royal New Zealand Navy.
- Petty Officer Stoker Mechanic Ernest James Rochfort – Royal New Zealand Navy.
- Chief Mechanician Herbert William Warner – Royal New Zealand Navy.
- Mechanician William Peter Wyatt – Royal New Zealand Navy.
- Warrant Officer Class II (acting) Ross Pearson Legge – Corps of Royal Engineers; at present serving with the New Zealand Army.
- Staff-Sergeant John Hannay Scott – New Zealand Territorial Force.
- Flight Sergeant William Samuel Charles Boyer – Royal New Zealand Air Force.
- Flight Sergeant Myrtle Burns – Women's Auxiliary Air Force, Royal New Zealand Air Force.
- Sergeant Francis William Diment – Royal New Zealand Air Force.
- Corporal Raymond Heathcote Bennetts – Royal New Zealand Air Force.

== Bar to Air Force Cross ==
- Wing Commander Robert Francis Watson AFC – Royal New Zealand Air Force.

== Queen's Commendation for Valuable Service in the Air ==
- Flight Lieutenant James Desmond Washington – Royal New Zealand Air Force.
