= Charles Turner (engineer) =

Charles William Oakey Turner ISO (27 January 1901 – 18 May 1994) was a notable New Zealand mechanical and civil engineer, engineering administrator and consultant. He was born in Cardiff, Wales, in 1901.

In 1953, Turner was awarded the Queen Elizabeth II Coronation Medal. In the 1963 Queen's Birthday Honours, he was appointed a Companion of the Imperial Service Order.
