= 1946 Birthday Honours (New Zealand) =

Award list for New Zealand

The 1946 King's Birthday Honours in New Zealand, celebrating the official birthday of King George VI, were appointments made by the King on the advice of the New Zealand government to various orders and honours to reward and highlight good works by New Zealanders. They were announced on 13 June 1946.

The recipients of honours are displayed here as they were styled before their new honour.

== Knight Bachelor ==
- Cecil Arthur Whitney. For services to war industries in New Zealand.
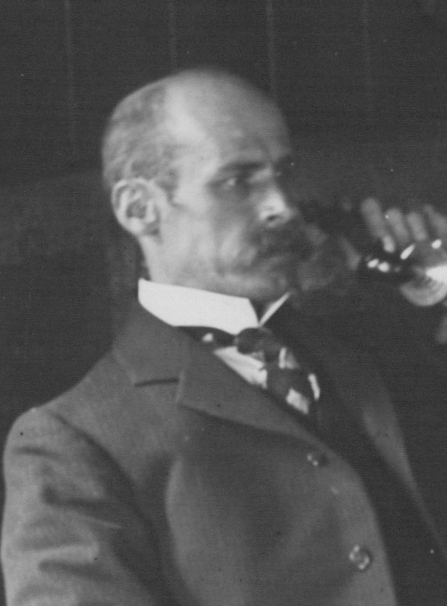
Sir Cecil Whitney

== Order of the Bath ==
=== Companion (CB) ===
Military division

- Major-General Norman William McDonald Weir CBE – New Zealand Military Forces.
- Air Commodore Arthur de Terrotte Nevill CBE – Royal New Zealand Air Force.
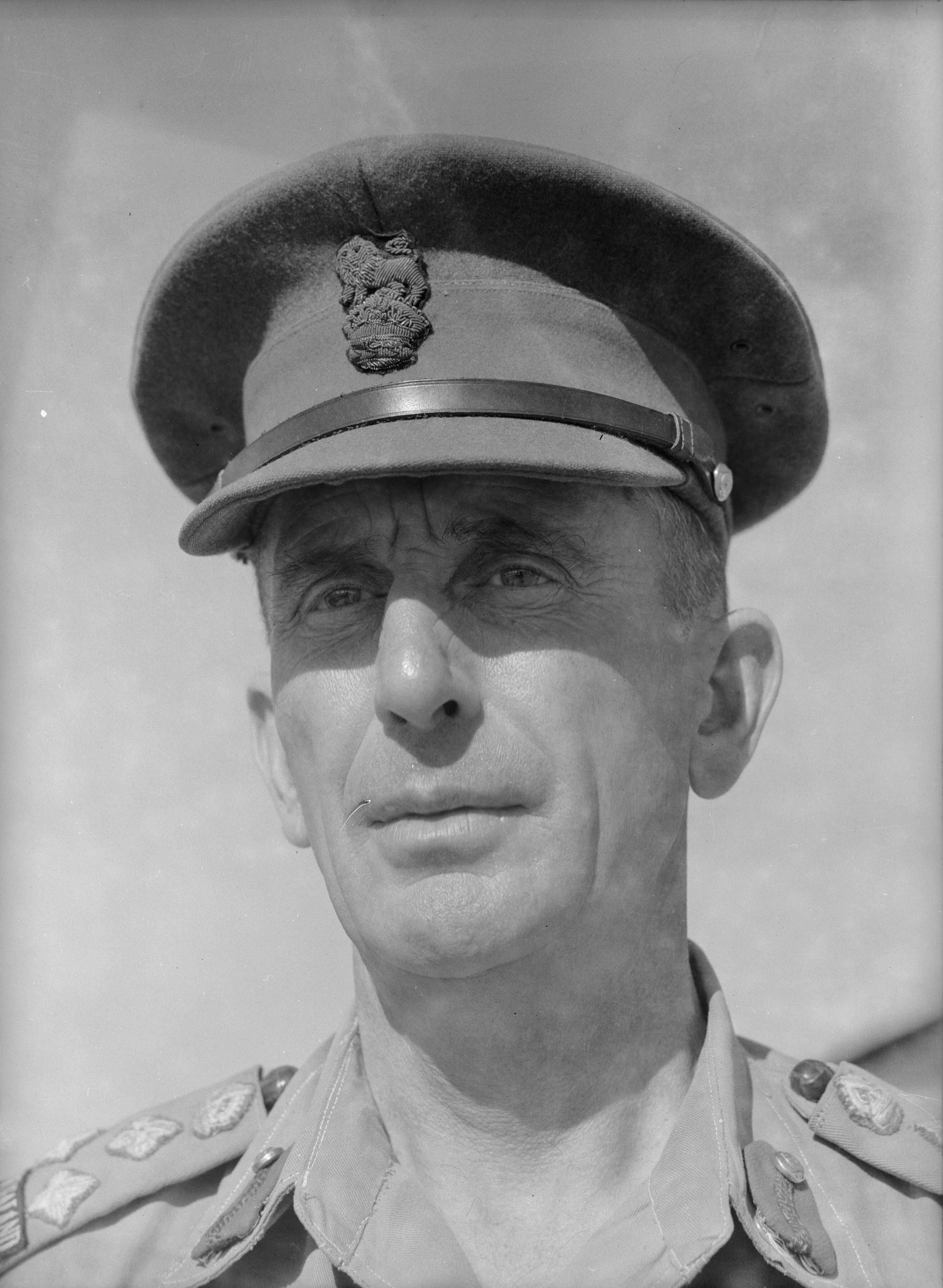
Norman Weir

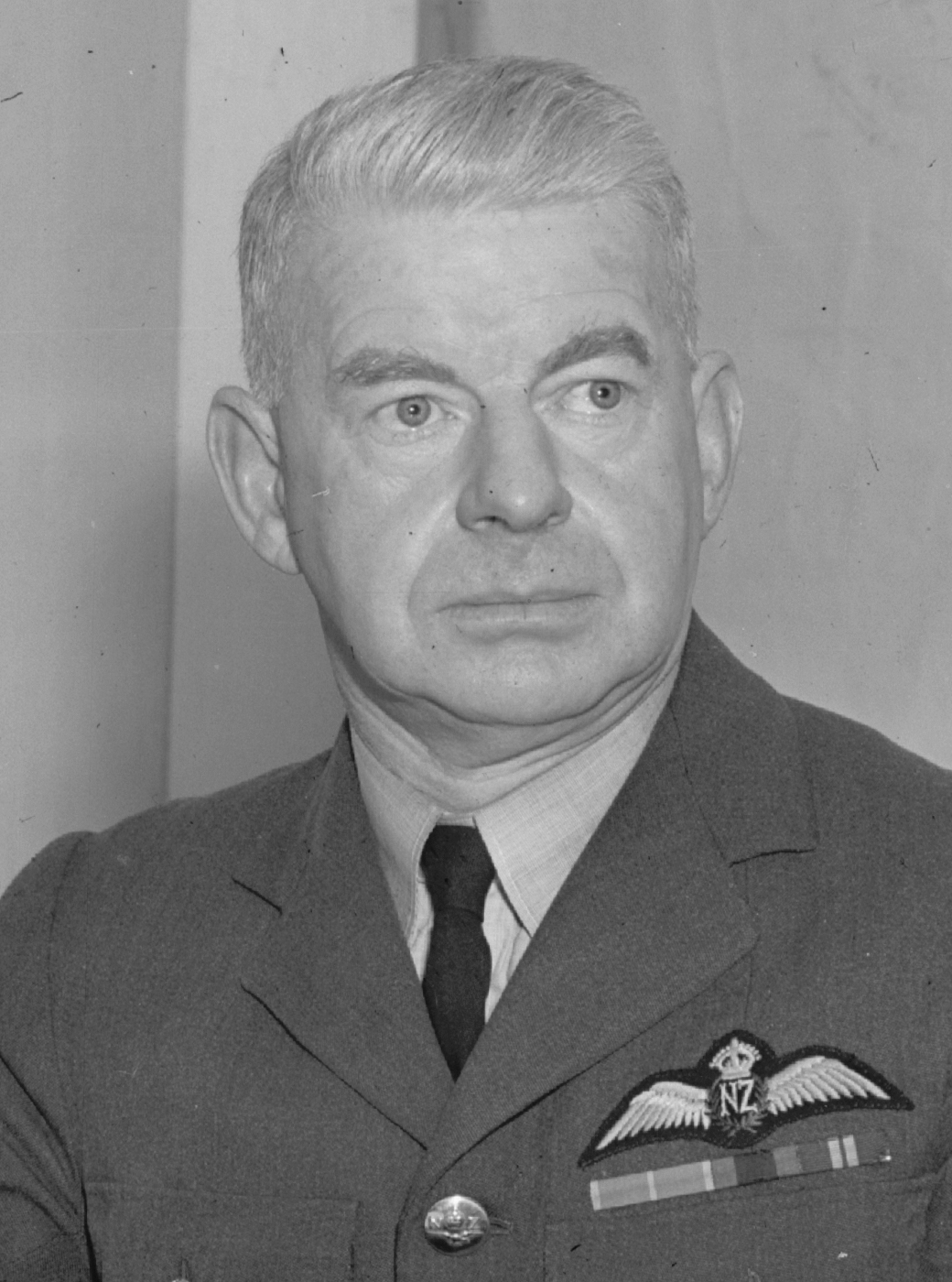
Arthur Nevill

== Order of Saint Michael and Saint George ==
=== Knight Commander (KCMG) ===
- Peter Henry Buck DSO MD DSc – director of Bernice P. Bishop Museum, Honolulu, and professor of anthropology, Yale University. For services to science and literature.
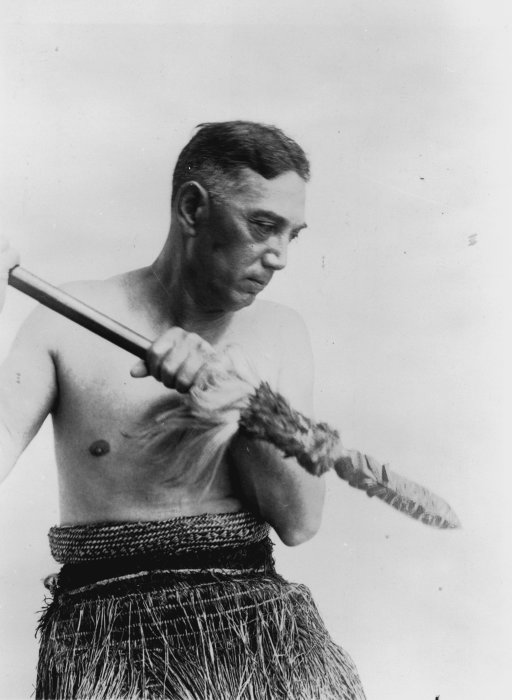
Sir Peter Buck

=== Companion (CMG) ===
- James Rankin Bartholomew – senior stipendiary magistrate, Dunedin.
- Colonel the Honourable Frederick Waite DSO OBE VD MLC – commissioner overseas for the National Patriotic Fund Board of New Zealand from 1940 to 1946.
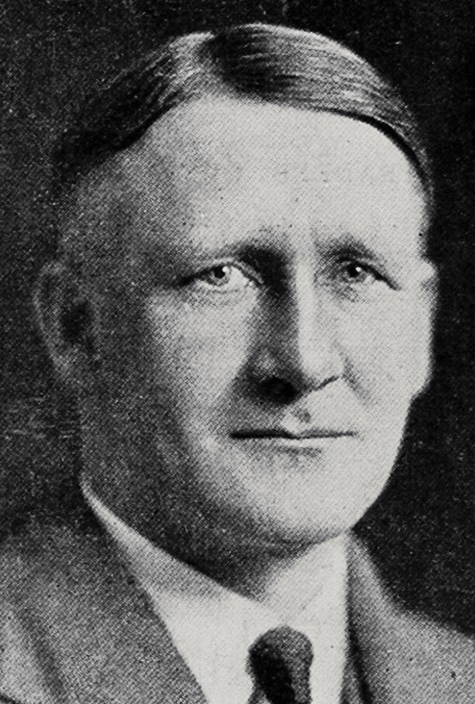
Fred Waite

== Order of the British Empire ==
=== Knight Commander (KBE) ===
Civil division

- John Rankine Brown – professor of classics, Victoria University College, Wellington. For services to education.

=== Commander (CBE) ===
Civil division

- Edwin Dudley Good – lately Comptroller of Customs, New Zealand.
- Robert McPherson MC – Wheat and Flour Controller, New Zealand.
- John O'Shea – of Wellington. For services to local government in New Zealand.
- Tom Lakin Paget MRCS LRCP – formerly director of maternal welfare, Health Department, New Zealand.
- Carl Victor Smith – president of the Manufacturers' Association, and a member of the Economic Stabilization Commission, New Zealand.

Military division

- Commander Ralph Newman DSO VD – Royal New Zealand Naval Volunteer Reserve.
- Acting Air Commodore Maurice William Buckley MBE – Royal New Zealand Air Force.
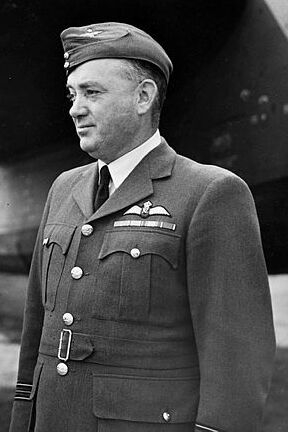
Maurice Buckley

=== Officer (OBE) ===
Civil division

- Christopher Thomas Aschman – chairman, Board of Governors of the Canterbury College, New Zealand. For services to education.
- Roy Matthew Vining Brasted – national secretary, New Zealand Young Men’s Christian Association.
- Walter Edmund Leadley – general secretary, Returned Servicemen's Re-establishment League, New Zealand.
- Donald McPhee – member of the Board of Trustees, New Zealand Institute for the Blind, and of the Executive of the New Zealand Blinded Soldiers Association.
- Doris Emily Menzies – matron, Waikato Hospital, Hamilton.
- Mary Louise Roberts – head of the Massage Department, Otago University Medical School.
- Walter Sneddon Robertson MB ChB – orthopaedic surgeon, Wellington Public Hospital.
- Thomas James Sherrard – assistant clerk of the Executive Council, New Zealand.
- Charles Victor Smith – chairman, Otago Joint Council of the Order of St John and the New Zealand Red Cross Society during the war.
- James Archibald Valentine – chairman of the Education Board, Taranaki.

Military division

- Acting Commander Ernest Walter Garner VD – Royal New Zealand Naval Volunteer Reserve.
- Surgeon Commander Arnold Perry VD – Royal New Zealand Naval Volunteer Reserve.
- Lieutenant-Colonel (temporary) Ernest Leonard Guy Brown – New Zealand Military Forces.
- Lieutenant-Colonel (temporary) Vincent James Innes – New Zealand Military Forces.
- Lieutenant-Colonel (temporary) Douglas Todd Maxwell – New Zealand Military Forces.
- Major Septimus Trainer Owen – New Zealand Military Forces.
- Lieutenant-Colonel (temporary) John Henry Sharp – New Zealand Military Forces.
- Acting Group Captain Charles Campbell Hunter – Royal New Zealand Air Force.
- Acting Group Captain Eric Gordon Moore – Royal New Zealand Air Force.
- Wing Commander Donald Charles Campbell – Royal New Zealand Air Force.
- Wing Commander Kenneth James Crichton – Royal New Zealand Air Force.
- Wing Commander Peter Alister Matheson – Royal New Zealand Air Force.
- Wing Commander Ian Alastair Scott – Royal New Zealand Air Force.
- Squadron Leader Geoffrey Cyril Ellis – Royal New Zealand Air Force.
- Squadron Leader. Alfred Benjamin Lindop – Royal New Zealand Air Force.
- Squadron Leader George Arthur Tillson – Royal New Zealand Air Force.
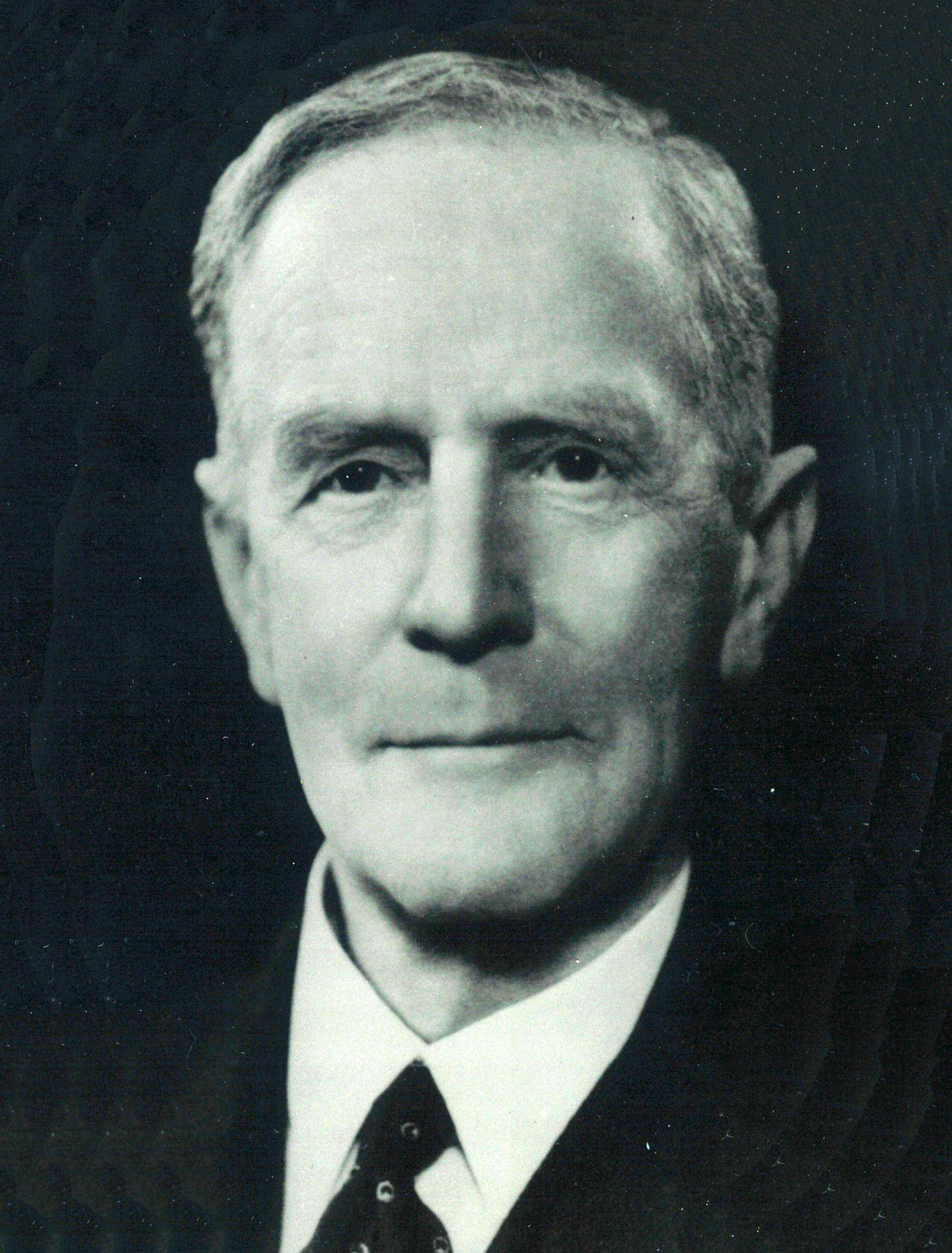
Christopher Aschman

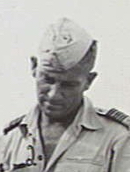
Peter Matheson

=== Member (MBE) ===
Civil division

- Hector James Aekins – secretary, Auckland Commercial Travellers' and Warehousemen's Club. For services in connection with patriotic and social welfare movements.
- Alexander Francis Ritchie Crawford MB ChB – a prominent medical practitioner of Invercargill.
- Alfred Hugh Crawley – chairman, Nelson City Patriotic Controlling Committee.
- Edith Mary De Castro – of Te Kūiti. For services in connection with patriotic organisations.
- Edward Gibbard – mayor of Dannevirke. For patriotic and social welfare work.
- John Black Grant – of Dunedin. For services in connection with patriotic and social welfare movements.
- Theresa Green JP – of Christchurch. For patriotic and social welfare work.
- John Athol Gregor – of Christchurch. For services to patriotic organisations.
- Fred Bennett Katene – of Wellington. For services in connection with the Māori war effort.
- David Ferguson Mackay – a member of the Auckland branch of the Order of St John and Joint Council Executive.
- Florence Isobel McBride – of Auckland. For patriotic and social welfare work during the war.
- Captain Harold Hilton Sergeant – harbourmaster at Auckland for 33 years.
- Irene May Leonora Taylor – head of the Voluntary Aids, Order of St John, Wellington.

Military division

- Lieutenant Frederick Kendall Gibson – Royal New Zealand Naval Volunteer Reserve.
- Temporary Lieutenant Fred Govsky – Royal New Zealand Naval Volunteer Reserve.
- Lieutenant-Commander Ronald Francis Hull – Royal New Zealand Naval Volunteer Reserve.
- Temporary Acting Electrical Lieutenant-Commander Edward John Marklew – Royal New Zealand Naval Volunteer Reserve.
- Captain George Edward Cox – New Zealand Military Forces.
- Major (temporary) (Quartermaster) John William Fletcher – New Zealand Military Forces.
- Major Christopher Henry Gallagher – New Zealand Military Forces.
- Subaltern Daisy Isaacs – New Zealand Women's Army Auxiliary Corps.
- Major Alfred George Lowry – New Zealand Military Forces.
- Captain Horace Maddocks – New Zealand Military Forces.
- Captain (temporary) (Quartermaster) James Malcolm – New Zealand Military Forces.
- Captain James Leslie Napier ED – New Zealand Military Forces.
- Lieutenant John Hill Skinner – New Zealand Military Forces.
- Captain Ernest Smith – New Zealand Military Forces.
- Major John Vincent DCM MM – New Zealand Military Forces.
- Major Gerald Harcort Weir ED – New Zealand Military Forces.
- Squadron Leader Owen Evans – Royal New Zealand Air Force.
- Acting Squadron Leader James William Aston – Royal New Zealand Air Force.
- Acting Squadron Leader Jack Garrance Dunstan – Royal New Zealand Air Force.
- Acting Squadron Leader John Harold McFadden – Royal New Zealand Air Force.
- Acting Squadron Leader Kenneth Arthur Sheard – Royal New Zealand Air Force.
- Acting Squadron Leader John William Todd – Royal New Zealand Air Force.
- Flight Lieutenant Maui John Hanslip Bruorton – Royal New Zealand Air Force,
- Flight Lieutenant Cecil George Burr – Royal New Zealand Air Force.
- Flight Lieutenant William Francis Falvey – Royal New Zealand Air Force.
- Flight Lieutenant Deryck Milne – Royal Air Force.
- Flight Lieutenant Ivan Sidney Rockell – Royal .New Zealand Air Force.
- Flight Lieutenant George Kemp Taylor – Royal New Zealand Air Force.
- Acting Flight Lieutenant Bruce William Thomas Richards – Royal New Zealand Air Force.
- Flying Officer Douglas Enoch Wood – Royal New Zealand Air Force.
- Warrant Officer Ernest Charles Calcinai – Royal New Zealand Air Force.

== British Empire Medal (BEM) ==
Military division

- Chief Wren First Class Dorothy Jenaway Davis – Women's Royal New Zealand Naval Service.
- Leading Writer (Temporary) James Morell Dickson – Royal New Zealand Navy.
- Chief Petty Officer De Lacy Albert Graham-Cameron – Royal New Zealand Navy.
- Chief Stoker Edward Searle Mason – Royal New Zealand Navy.
- Petty Officer Cook (O) Cecil Ralph Burnett Tamplin – Royal New Zealand Navy.
- Rigger Cromwell Weston – Royal New Zealand Navy.
- Staff-Sergeant Fanny Eva Grace Arndt – New Zealand Women's Army Auxiliary Corps.
- Staff-Sergeant Phyllis Myrtle Gerard – New Zealand Women's Army Auxiliary Corps.
- Staff-Sergeant Robert Joseph Harris – New Zealand Military Forces.
- Staff-Sergeant Ernest Roy Redding – New Zealand Military Forces.
- Warrant Officer Class II (temporary) John Stuart Robertson – New Zealand Military Forces.
- Staff-Sergeant William Alexander Sammons – New Zealand Military Forces.
- Acting Warrant Officer Ian McLean Miller – Royal New Zealand Air Force.
- Flight Sergeant Herbert Graham Carter – Royal New Zealand Air Force.
- Flight Sergeant Arthur Albert Kerridge – Royal New Zealand Air Force.
- Flight Sergeant (now Warrant Officer) Gordon Lindsay Whyte – Royal New Zealand Air Force.
- Acting Flight Sergeant Maurice Alexander Dixon – Royal New Zealand Air Force.
- Acting Flight Sergeant (now Warrant Officer) Francis Bertram Weldon – Royal New Zealand Air Force.
- Senior Sergeant Margaret Jane Gerrie – New Zealand Women's Auxiliary Air Force.
- Sergeant David Spencer Giffin – Royal New Zealand Air Force.
- Sergeant Katherine Ellen O'Brien – New Zealand Women's Auxiliary Air Force.
- Corporal Elizabeth May Robinson – New Zealand Women's Auxiliary Air Force.

== Royal Red Cross ==
=== Associate (ARRC) ===
- Charge Sister Christina McDonald – New Zealand Army Nursing Service.
- Charge Sister (Mrs) Amy Marion Miller – New Zealand Army Nursing Service.
- Charge Sister Sarah Eileen Georgina Sherrard – New Zealand Army Nursing Service.

== Air Force Cross (AFC) ==
- Wing Commander Ronald Affleck Kirkup – Royal New Zealand Air Force.
- Acting Squadron Leader William Keith Paterson – Royal New Zealand Air Force.
- Flight Lieutenant Albert Samuel Agar – Royal New Zealand Air Force.
- Flight Lieutenant William Robert Esquilant – Royal New Zealand Air Force.
- Flight Lieutenant James Thomas Adams Harris – Royal New Zealand Air Force.
- Flight Lieutenant John Samuel Shephard – Royal New Zealand Air Force.
- Warrant Officer John Phillip Wilson – Royal New Zealand Air Force.

== Mention in Despatches ==
- Wing Commander George Henry Fisher – Royal New Zealand Air Force.
- Wing Commander Albert Tom Giles – Royal New Zealand Air Force.
- Wing Commander Donald Edward Grigg MBE – Royal New Zealand Air Force.
- Squadron Leader Congreve John Banwell – Royal New Zealand Air Force.
- Squadron Leader Francis James Auchmuty Fulton – Royal New Zealand Air Force.
- Squadron Leader Donald George Sinclair – Royal New Zealand Air Force.
- Squadron Leader John Henley James Stevenson – Royal New Zealand Air Force.
- Flight Lieutenant Edward Terence Aickin – Royal New Zealand Air Force.
- Flight Lieutenant John Percival Conyers-Brown – Royal New Zealand Air Force.
- Flight Lieutenant Trevor Alfred Gallagher – Royal New Zealand Air Force.
- Flight Lieutenant William James Eglington Vernon Grace – Royal New Zealand Air Force.
- Flight Lieutenant Donald Ernest Hopwood – Royal New Zealand Air Force.
- Flying Officer John Dickson Fergusson – Royal New Zealand Air Force.
- Flying Officer George Alexander Folster – Royal New Zealand Air Force.
- Flying Officer Hew Seton Montgomerie – Royal New Zealand Air Force.
- Flying Officer Howard Cattle Mullenger – Royal New Zealand Air Force.
- Flying Officer Robert Hume Regnault – Royal New Zealand Air Force.
- Flight Sergeant Geoffrey Oswald Ernest Eames – Royal New Zealand Air Force.
- Flight Sergeant Stanley George Fagen – Royal New Zealand Air Force.
- Flight Sergeant Francis Joseph Stewart – Royal New Zealand Air Force.
- Corporal Frederick Keith Davies – Royal New Zealand Air Force.
- Corporal Kenneth Pearson McKay – Royal New Zealand Air Force.
- Leading Aircraftman Ronald Stanley Walters – Royal New Zealand Air Force.
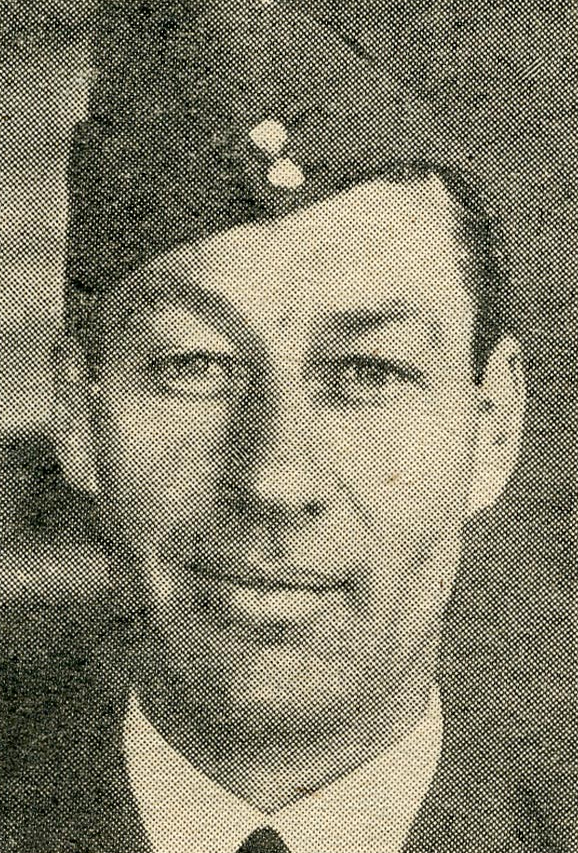
Donald Grigg
