= John Andrew (trade negotiator) =

New Zealand trade negotiator (1896–1968)

Sir John Andrew KBE
- Born: 19 August 1896; Mosgiel, New Zealand
- Died: 5 August 1968 (aged 71); Hyde, New Zealand
- Occupations: Farmer; company director; trade negotiator
- Known for: International free trade advocacy

Sir John Andrew KBE (19 August 1896 – 5 August 1968) was a New Zealand farmer, company director, and trade negotiator. He was born at Mosgiel, New Zealand, on 19 August 1896.

In 1953, Andrew was awarded the Queen Elizabeth II Coronation Medal. In the 1957 New Year Honours, he was appointed a Commander of the Order of the British Empire, for services to farming. He was promoted to Knight Commander of the same order, for public services, in the 1963 Queen's Birthday Honours.
