= Arthur Davenport (electrical engineer) =

Electrical Engineer

Arthur Egbert Davenport CMG (17 April 1901 – 15 April 1973) was a New Zealand electrical engineer and electricity administrator. He was born in Marton, New Zealand.

In 1953, Davenport was awarded the Queen Elizabeth II Coronation Medal. In the 1963 Queen's Birthday Honours, he was appointed a Companion of the Order of St Michael and St George, in recognition of his service as general manager of the New Zealand Electricity Department.
