= Louie Roberts =

New Zealand masseuse, physiotherapist and mountaineer

Mary Louise Roberts OBE (17 February 1886 – 27 May 1968) was a New Zealand masseuse, physiotherapist and mountaineer. She was born in Dunedin, New Zealand, in 1886. She was New Zealand's most celebrated physiotherapist (before the coining of that name) and was for more the twenty years the principal of Dunedin Hospital school of massage, the only such training facility in New Zealand. In the 1946 King's Birthday Honours, Roberts was appointed an Officer of the Order of the British Empire.
