= Alexander McGregor Grant =

Alex Grant

Personal information
- Full name: Alexander McGregor Grant
- Born: 29 July 1888; Casterton, Victoria, Australia
- Died: 25 June 1973 (aged 84); Remuera, New Zealand
- Original team: Ormond College / Hamilton College

Playing career^{1}
Years	Club	Games (Goals)
1909–1910	University	2 (0)
- ^{1} Playing statistics correct to the end of 1910.

Alexander McGregor Grant CBE (29 July 1888 – 25 June 1973) was a New Zealand surgeon, horse-racing administrator, racehorse owner and breeder.

== Early life and education ==
Grant was born in Casterton, Victoria, Australia on 29 July 1888. He gained his medical degree in 1910 from the University of Melbourne.

== Career ==
Grant moved to New Zealand to work as a house surgeon at Auckland Hospital from 1911 to 1914. In 1915 he was appointed acting medical superintendent, the youngest to hold the position, until leaving to serve in WWI. From 1916 he served as Captain Surgeon with the No. 2 New Zealand Field Ambulance of the medical corps of the New Zealand Expeditionary Force. He also served in World War II.

On his return from WWI he went into private practice also becoming an honorary surgeon at Auckland Hospital from 1920 until 1948. He was known for his skill especially at appendectomies.

== Sport and racing ==
Before moving to New Zealand Grant was an Australian rules footballer who played for the University Football Club in the Victorian Football League (VFL). In Auckland he was associated with the Auckland Cricket Association and served on the Eden Park Trust Board.

Grant was a rider, horse trainer and race horse owner. He participated in the Pakuranga Hunt after coming to Auckland, serving as deputy master from 1920 until 1965. He was vice-president of the Auckland Racing Club from 1933 and president from 1945 until 1968. "During his time the club introduced the photo finish, filming of races, and routine swabbing of horses, as well as building a new members’ stand."

== Honours and awards ==
Grant was awarded the British War Medal for his service in WWI. In the 1963 Queen's Birthday Honours, Grant was appointed a Commander of the Order of the British Empire, for services to medicine and racing.

== Personal life ==
Grant married Edith Ellen Gill in 1918. He died on 25 June 1973 in Auckland.
