= Alexander Grant (IMS) =

Scottish surgeon major in the Indian Medical Service

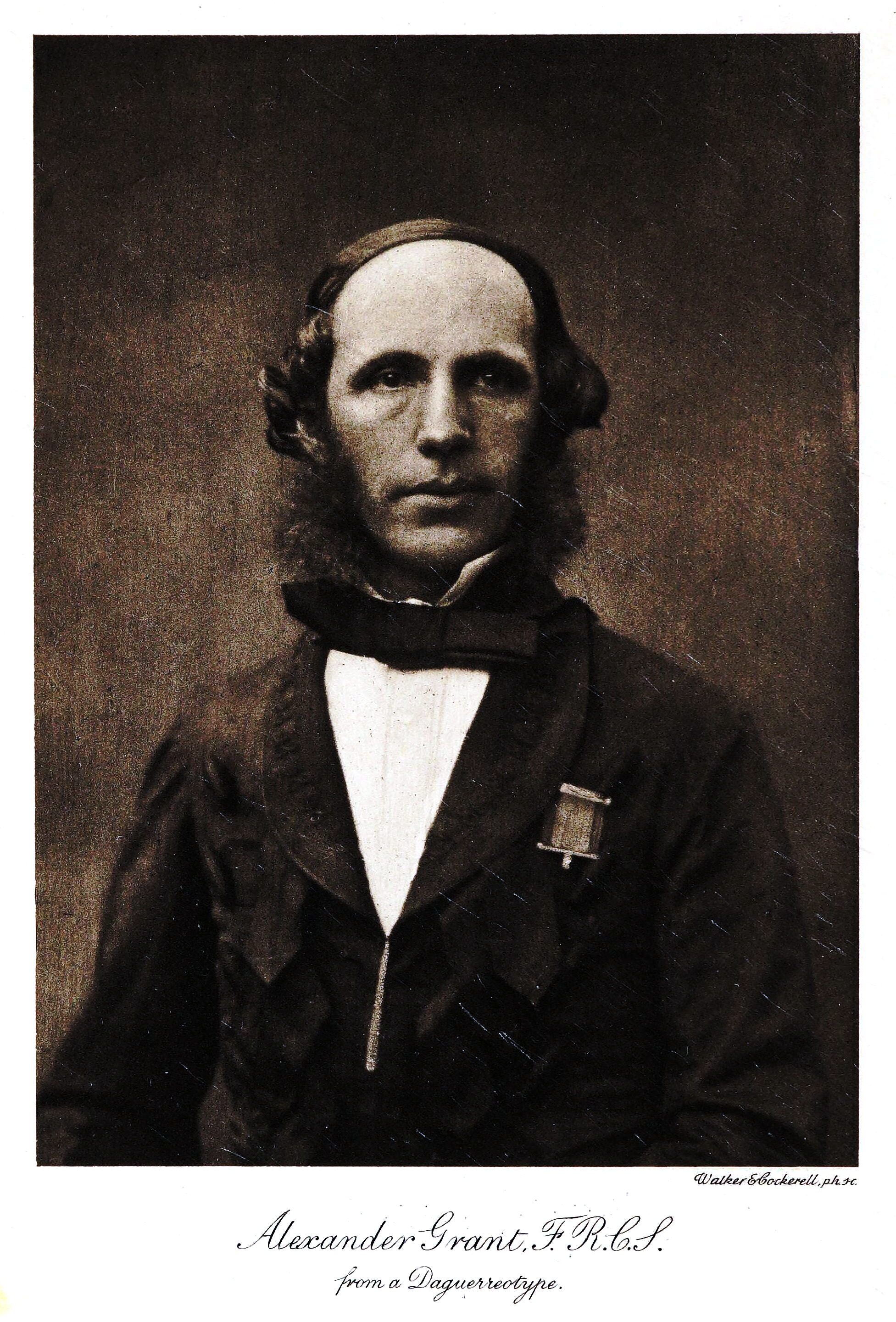

Surgeon-Major Alexander Grant FRCS (22 January 1817 – 3 January 1900) was a British army surgeon who served in the Indian Medical Service.

Grant was born at Elgin, Morayshire and studied at Aberdeen University followed by medicine at Glasgow and Edinburgh. He was admitted FRCS in 1838. After failing to receive commission he went aboard The Thames as a surgeon from 1839 to 1840. He then joined in the Bengal Medical Service after he reached Calcutta, India in April 1841 to join the 55th Foot which was sent to China and involved in the capture of Amoy, Tinghai. He was involved in managing cholera in the 49th Foot under Lord Saltoun at Nankin. He then stayed in Chusan with the 55th.

After some service in the 98th Foot in Hong Kong, he went to Madras with the 41st Madras Native Infantry. In 1845, he was a Civil Surgeon for Bhagalpur, 1848 Chapra and in 1849 he became surgeon to Lord Dalhousie which involved travelling around Asia. In 1856 he was involved in a reorganization of the Royal and Indian Medical Services. He sought to introduce along with Dalhousie self-sufficiency in India including in all matters of medical supplies. Dalhousie even had Grant examine all the mineral water resources of India to examine for medically useful spas. In 1857, he was appointed as Apothecary General and Opium Examiner to the Government of India. He founded the Indian Annals of Medical Science in 1853 which he continued to edit until he retired. He retired in 1863 and settled in Connaught Square, Hyde Park with his sister.
