= Donald Sandys Wunsch =

Donald Frederick Sandys Wunsch OBE (16 January 1887 – 23 August 1973) was a notable New Zealand chemical engineer and factory manager. He was born in Manchester, England, in 1887.

In the 1957 New Year Honours, he was appointed an Officer of the Order of the British Empire, in recognition of his role as chairman of the Advisory Council of Scientific and Industrial Research.

In 2010, IChemE in New Zealand instituted the annual Kennedy-Wunsch lecture, in recognition of the pioneering roles that both Wunsch and Miles Kennedy played in the development of chemical engineering in New Zealand.
