= Gordon White =

Gordon White may refer to:

- Gordon White (cricketer) (1882–1918), South African cricketer
- Gordon White, Baron White of Hull (1923–1995), British businessman
- Gordon C. White, American college basketball coach
