= Christina McDonald (nurse) =

New Zealand nurse (1911–1996)

Christina McDonald RRC (21 August 1911 – 10 July 1996) was a New Zealand nurse. She served with the Royal New Zealand Navy in World War II and was Director of Nursing Services for the New Zealand Army, Navy and Air Force from 1958 to 1964.

== Early life ==
McDonald was born in Invercargill, in the province of Southland. She was the eldest of six children of farmers John Alexander McDonald and Elizabeth Margaret McDonald, née Beer. McDonald attended school at Wreys Bush Convent near Winton, and the Dominican Sisters Convent in Queenstown. The family later moved to Tapanui, in the province of Otago. In 1930 McDonald began training at Dunedin Hospital and qualified as a registered nurse in 1934.

== Career ==
After her training, McDonald moved to Christchurch and nursed at Lewisham Hospital. She was then appointed sub-matron at Queen Mary Hospital in Hanmer Springs, in North Canterbury. In 1943 she joined the Royal New Zealand Nursing Corps and was seconded to the Royal New Zealand Navy. She was appointed one of the first nursing sisters at the newly-established Royal New Zealand Navy Hospital in Devonport, Auckland, and later became Sister in Charge there. In 1946 she returned to the New Zealand Army and was posted to Japan. She served as matron of the 6th New Zealand General Hospital until 1949.

In January 1949 McDonald returned to New Zealand and became matron at the Navy Hospital in Devonport. In 1958 she was appointed Director of Nursing Services (Army, Navy, Air) and posted to Fort Dorset in Wellington. She retired in 1964 and lived in Torbay. In 1968 she returned to Tapanui to nurse her elderly mother and became matron of Tapanui Hospital. McDonald settled in Clyde in 1973 and died at Alexandra on 10 July 1996.

== Honours and awards ==
McDonald was made an Associate of the Royal Red Cross (ARRC) in the 1946 King's Birthday Honours, and promoted to Member of the Royal Red Cross (RRC) in the 1953 Coronation Honours. In 1953, McCormack was awarded the Queen Elizabeth II Coronation Medal, and she was one of a group of twelve servicewomen who attended Queen Elizabeth II's coronation.
