= Wilfrid Sim =

New Zealand lawyer and soldier

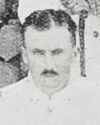
Sim in 1914

Sir Wilfrid Joseph Sim KBE MC OStJ QC (3 November 1890 – 5 November 1974) was a New Zealand lawyer and soldier.

Sim was born in Dunedin, Otago, New Zealand in 1890. William Sim was his father. Before WWI, he lived in Dunedin and when his former business partner, John Findlay, was hesitant to take him on again after the war, Sim moved to Christchurch and joined Duncan, Cotterill and Company as a partner.

Sim was appointed King's Counsel on 19 July 1939 and moved to Wellington. He was appointed an Officer of the Order of St John in 1946. In the 1951 New Year Honours, he was appointed a Knight Commander of the Order of the British Empire, for public services. In 1953, he was awarded the Queen Elizabeth II Coronation Medal.

Sim was a Christchurch City Councillor from 1925 to 1927. He was a member of the National Party and served as its president for seven years from 1944 to 1951.
