= 1881 Christchurch mayoral election =

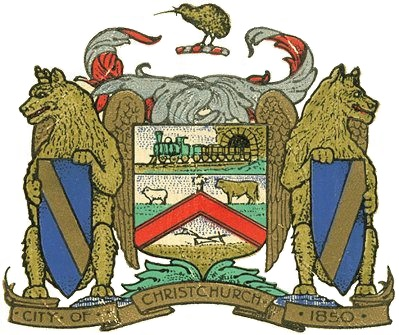
- 30 November 1881
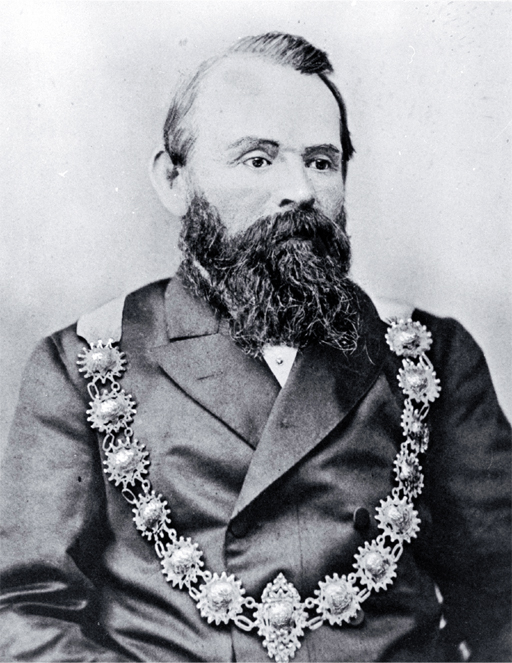
Candidate	George Ruddenklau	Charles Taylor
Party	Independent	Independent
Popular vote	594	565
Percentage	51.25	48.75
Mayor before election
James Gapes
Elected mayor
George Ruddenklau

The Christchurch mayoral election held on 30 November 1881 was contested by German-born baker, hotel proprietor and businessman George Ruddenklau, and businessman Charles Taylor. The election was won by Ruddenklau with a small margin.

== Background and campaign ==
The election was set for 30 November 1881. At the beginning of September 1881, city councillors Taylor and Aaron Ayers were discussed in the media as likely candidates for the upcoming mayoral election. On 25 November, the incumbent James Gapes announced his candidacy for a third term as mayor, as he was not satisfied with the other two contenders for the position, city councillors Charles Taylor, and George Ruddenklau. Following a requisition, Gapes arranged a public meeting at short notice for Friday, 25 November at the Gaiety Theatre in Cathedral Square, which was well attended. At the meeting, chaired by the local member of parliament Samuel Paull Andrews, Gapes explained his political views and justified his actions over the previous twelve months. A further public meeting was held at the same venue on Monday, 28 November. Gapes, in his role as mayor, chaired the meeting, and Taylor and Ruddenklau both spoke. The candidates differed in their opinion in how the market square should be run.

Earlier on 28 November, Gapes had advertised that he had withdrawn from the contest.

== Candidates ==
Whilst New Zealand was a young colony at the time, both candidates were regarded by some as foreigners as they did not hail from Britain. Ruddenklau was a native German, although had lived amongst English people for 30 years and had been in Christchurch since 1857. Taylor was from North America but stressed that his great-grandparents remained aligned to England after the American Revolution.

=== Taylor ===
Charles Benjamin Taylor was born in 1824 in Nova Scotia. He was a timber merchant, trader, exporter and importer, owned two ships, and was a member of the chamber of commerce. From 1879, Taylor was the United States consular agent at Christchurch. He married in Christchurch in 1868, but his wife died in childbirth a year later and a further year later, he married her sister; there were seven children from that marriage. Taylor was first elected to Christchurch City Council in September 1879.

=== Ruddenklau ===
John George Ruddenklau was born in 1829 in Hesse, Germany. He married in England and came to Christchurch in 1857. He at first worked in his profession as a baker but then set up the City Hotel. He was one of the driving forces behind the establishment of the German Church in Christchurch, which was completed in 1874. Ruddenklau was first elected onto Christchurch City Council in January 1866 and served one two-year term. He was a city councillor again in 1877 but was one of the five councillors who resigned in January 1878 in protest against William Wilson's election.

== Results ==
1881 Christchurch mayoral election
Party	Candidate	Votes	%	±%
Independent	George Ruddenklau	594	51.25	
Independent	Charles Benjamin Taylor	565	48.75	
Majority		29	2.50	
Turnout		1,159		

The election was won by Ruddenklau on 30 November with a 2.5% vote margin, possibly helped by the support of The Star just prior to the election. Ruddenklau was installed as the next mayor on 21 December 1881. After his one-year term, he was re-elected mayor unopposed. He retired after two terms and stood in the 1884 general election in the Stanmore electorate but was unsuccessful. Ruddenklau died in 1891.

Taylor and his family left New Zealand in 1884 and settled in Oakland, California.
