= Raymond J. Collins =

New Zealand philatelist (1897–1965)

Raymond James George Collins MBE (8 August 1897 – 5 June 1965) was a New Zealand philatelist who was added to the Roll of Distinguished Philatelists in 1936 and was the youngest man to receive that honour. Collins was unable to attend the signing ceremony in person.

Collins was the son of James Francis Collins. He married Mabel Lillian Vizer in Christchurch on 14 December 1922.

Also in 1922, Collins organized the first New Zealand philatelic exhibition and congress, at which the New Zealand Philatelic Council was formed. That same year he was appointed the New Zealand representative of the Royal Philatelic Society. The founder of Verne Collins & Company of Christchurch, he was a prolific author on the philately of New Zealand and edited and published the New Zealand Stamp Collector until shortly before his death. He was appointed a Member of the Order of the British Empire in the 1957 New Year Honours.

== Selected publications ==
- Collins, R.J.C. (1921). New Zealand: a philatelic handbook. Christchurch: Verne & Co.
- Collins, R.J.C. (1924). The stamps of the Pacific Islands. Christchurch: Verne & Co.
- Collins, R.J.C. (1926). The cancellations of New Zealand. Christchurch: Verne & Co.
- Collins, R.J.C. (1951). The most interesting postage stamp of New Zealand. Christchurch: Verne & Co.
- Lee, G.R. (1953). Collins, R.J.C.; Watts, C.W. (eds.). The penny universal of New Zealand. Wellington: Royal Philatelic Society of New Zealand.
