= Gordon Whyte (cricketer) =

New Zealand cricketer, radio announcer and aviation official

Personal information
- Full name: Gordon Lindsay Whyte
- Born: 13 August 1915; Wellington, New Zealand
- Died: 24 June 2007 (aged 91); Wellington, New Zealand
- Batting: Left-handed
- Bowling: Right-arm leg-spin
- Role: Bowler

Domestic team information
- Years: Team
- 1939–40: Wellington
- Source: Cricinfo, 27 October 2020

Gordon Lindsay Whyte BEM (13 August 1915 – 24 June 2007) was a New Zealand cricketer, radio announcer and senior aviation official. He played in one first-class match for Wellington in 1939/40, described cricket and football matches in Wellington for the New Zealand Broadcasting Corporation from 1949 to 1972, and worked for the New Zealand National Airways Corporation from 1947 to 1972.

== Life and career ==
After attending Wellington College, Wellington, from 1929 to 1931, Whyte learned shorthand and typing at a business college and qualified as a Hansard reporter. He married Hilda Milroy in Wellington in May 1941.

Playing for Wellington College Old Boys, Whyte was prominent in senior cricket in Wellington, chiefly for his leg-spin bowling. In a match in November 1941 he took 7 for 9 and 6 for 10. He sometimes represented Wellington, but only once in first-class cricket, when Wellington played Otago in the 1939–40 Plunket Shield, and he made 45 runs and took one wicket. He took 8 for 87 in the first innings when he captained Wellington in a two-day match against Nelson in March 1945. He also played senior soccer in Wellington.

During World War II, Whyte served with a construction unit in Fiji before joining the Royal New Zealand Air Force as an administrative clerk. He served as secretary to Air Vice-Marshal Leonard Isitt when Isitt was the Chief of the Air Staff of the Air Force during the war. He was awarded the British Empire Medal (Military Division) in the 1946 King's Birthday Honours.

Whyte was appointed chairman's secretary of the New Zealand National Airways Corporation in 1947 and remained with the corporation until 1972. In 1949 he began broadcasting cricket and soccer matches at the Basin Reserve in Wellington for radio station 2YA, and kept going until his wife pointed out to him in 1972 that his voice was getting a little raspy. He also commentated during the first live telecast from the Basin Reserve when South Africa played in 1963–64.

Whyte served in senior positions with the New Zealand Football Association in the 1960s, managing teams, liaising with visiting teams, and planning the first national league in 1964. His plan was rejected at the time, and soccer continued to be played in regional competitions, but when a national league was eventually established it resembled the one he had proposed.

Whyte wrote his broadcasting memoirs, It's Not All Cricket, in 2005.
