= 1939 Birthday Honours =

British government recognitions

The King's Birthday Honours 1939 were appointments in many of the Commonwealth realms of King George VI to various orders and honours to reward and highlight good works by citizens of those countries. The appointments were made to celebrate the official birthday of the King. They were announced on 6 June 1939 for the United Kingdom and Colonies.

The recipients of honours are displayed here as they were styled before their new honour, and arranged by honour, with classes (Knight, Knight Grand Cross, etc.) and then divisions (Military, Civil, etc.) as appropriate.

== United Kingdom and Colonies ==
=== Baron ===
- Sir Arthur Richard de Capell Brooke, Bt JP DL. For political and public services in Northamptonshire.
- Major Sir Herbert Robin Cayzer, Bt, Member of Parliament for Portsmouth South, December 1918 to 1922 and since August 1923. For political and public services.
- Captain the Right Honourable Herbert Dixon, OBE MP, Member of Parliament for the Pottinger Division of Belfast, December 1918, and for East Belfast since 1922; and Member of the Northern Ireland Parliament for East Belfast, 1921–29, and for the Bloomfield Division since 1929. Parliamentary Secretary to the Ministry of Finance and Chief Whip in Northern Ireland since 1921.
- Major Sir Henry Edward Lyons, Bt OBE. For political and public services.
- Sir Frederick James Marquis, Chairman of Lewis's Ltd. For public services.

=== Privy Councillor ===
- The Honourable James Gray Stuart, MVO MC MP, Member of Parliament for Moray and Nairn since December 1923. A Lord Commissioner of HM Treasury and Scottish Unionist Whip since May 1935.
- Herwald Ramsbotham, OBE MC MP, Member of Parliament for Lancaster since May 1929. Parliamentary Secretary to the Board of Education, November 1931 to June 1935, and to the Ministry of Agriculture, November 1935 to 1936. Minister of Pensions since September 1936.

=== Baronet ===
- Sir Edward Taswell Campbell, JP MP, Member of Parliament for North-West Camberwell, 1923 to May 1929, and for Bromley since September 1930. For political and public services.
- Major William Philip Colfox, MC JP MP, Member of Parliament for North Dorset 1918–1922 and for West Dorset since 1922. For political and public services.
- William Julien Courtauld, JP. For public services and benefactions in Essex.
- Robert Hutchison, MD, President of the Royal College of Physicians.
- Harry Oakes. For public and philanthropic services.

=== Knight Bachelor ===
- William Fawell Ascroft, JP DL. For public services in Preston.
- Stanley James Aubrey, Chairman of the Committee of Lloyd's.
- Clarence Edward Bartholomew, OBE, Chairman and Managing Director of Bryant & May Ltd. For public and social services.
- Max Beerbohm,. Writer and Caricaturist.
- Edwin John Butler, CMG, Secretary to the Committee of the Privy Council for Agricultural Research and Secretary to the Agricultural Research Council.
- Francis Carnegie, CBE, Chief Superintendent of Ordnance Factories, War Office.
- Cecil Thomas Carr, LLD, Editor of Revised Statutes and Statutory Rules and Orders.
- John Forster, Deputy Umpire under the Unemployment Insurance Acts.
- William Fraser, CBE, Deputy Chairman of the Anglo-Iranian Oil Company.
- Frederic Bertram Galer, FIA. For political and public services in Streatham.
- William Waymouth Gibson, President of the Council of the Law Society.
- John Wilson Gleed, JP. For political and public services in Lincolnshire.
- Philip Edward Haldin. For political and public services.
- Alderman Arthur Harbord, CBE JP MP, Member of Parliament for Great Yarmouth, 1922–24; and since 1929. For political and public services.
- Robert Ernest Kelly, CB FRCS, Professor of Surgery, University of Liverpool, Senior Honorary Surgeon, Liverpool Royal Infirmary.
- Professor John Graham Kerr, FRS JP MP, Member of Parliament for the Scottish Universities since June, 1935. For political and public services in Scotland.
- Alderman Hubert Aloysius Leicester, JP. For political and public services in Worcester.
- Douglas McCraith, JP. For political and public services in Nottingham.
- Alexander Campbell Maclean. For public and philanthropic services.
- Lieutenant-Colonel Robert Edmund Martin, CMG JP, Chairman of the Leicestershire County Council.
- George Morton, KC, Chairman of the General Board of Control for Scotland, and Sheriff of Aberdeen, Kincardine and Banff.
- Professor Owen Willans Richardson, FRS, Yarrow Research Professor of the Royal Society, University of London.
- James Martin Ritchie, CBE JP, Chairman of the Bridgeton Employment Committee.
- Lieutenant-Colonel Edmund Royds, OBE DL, Member of Parliament for Grantham, 1910–22. For political and public services in Lincolnshire.
- Councillor Frank Leyden Sargent. For political and public services in East Islington.
- Thomas Drummond Shiels, MC, Chairman of the Joint Standing Committee for Educational work of the Non-political Empire Societies in London.
- Allan Gordon Smith, DL. For political and public services.
- Bernard Sugden, JP. For political and public services in the West Riding of Yorkshire.
- Professor Jocelyn Field Thorpe, CBE FRS, Chairman of the Smoke Sub-Committee, Chemical Defence Committee, War Office.
- Major James Clifford Tozer, JP. For political and public services in Plymouth.
- Wynn Powell Wheldon, DSO, Permanent Secretary, Welsh Department, Board of Education.
- Albert Scholick Wilkin, JP. For political and public services in Newcastle-upon Tyne.
- Herbert Geraint Williams, MP, Member of Parliament for Reading, 1924–29, and for Croydon South since 1932, Parliamentary Secretary to the Board of Trade, 1928–29. For political and public services.
- Isaac Henry Wilson, JP. For political and public services in Mitcham, Surrey.

Dominions

- The Honourable William Charles Angliss, MLC. For public services in the State of Victoria.
- Norman Everard Brookes. For public services in the Commonwealth of Australia.
- Robert McIlwaine,, formerly a Judge of the High Court of Southern Rhodesia. For public services.
- Gerald Mussen. For public services in the Commonwealth of Australia.
- Alderman Norman Lindfield Nock, Lord Mayor of the City of Sydney, State of New South Wales.
- The Honourable John Charles Puddester, Commissioner for Public Health and Welfare, Newfoundland.
- Professor Ernest Scott, an eminent historian in the Commonwealth of Australia.

India

- Andrew Gourlay Clow, CSI CIE, Indian Civil Service, Member of the Governor-General's Executive Council.
- Abraham Jeremy Raisman, CSI, Indian Civil Service, Member of the Governor-General's Executive Council.
- Alfred William Ewart Wort, Puisne Judge of the High Court of Judicature at Patna, Bihar.
- Hugh Rahere Panckridge, Puisne Judge of the High Court of Judicature at Fort William in Bengal.
- Sidney Burn, Indian Civil Service, Puisne Judge of the High Court of Judicature at Fort St. George, Madras.
- George Hemming Spence, CSI, Indian Civil Service, Secretary to the Government of India in the Legislative Department.
- Gurunath Venkatesh Bewoor, CIE, Indian Civil Service, Director-General of Posts and Telegraphs.
- Benegal Rama Rao, CIE, Indian Civil Service, Agent-General for India in the Union of South Africa.
- Thomas Lamb, Member of the Bengal Legislative Council, and Senior Director of Messrs. Begg Dunlop & Co., Calcutta, Bengal.
- Major Sardar Muhammad Nawaz Khan, ITF, Member of the Punjab Legislative Assembly, and Proprietor of the Kot Estates, Kot Fateh Khan, Attock District, Punjab.
- Apji Onkar Singh, CIE, Major-General in the Kotah State Forces, Senior Member, Mahakma Khas, Kotah State, Rajputana.
- Charles William Charteris Carson, CIE, Finance Minister, Gwalior.
- Sultan Meherally Chinoy, JP, Managing Director, Messrs. F. M. Chinoy & Co., Ltd., Bombay.
- Chirravoori Yajneswara Chintamani, LLD, Chief Editor, The Leader, Allahabad, United Provinces.
- Sardar Bahadur Datar Singh, Agriculturist, Montgomery, Punjab.

Burma

- John William Darwood, Managing Director, J. W. Darwood & Co., Ltd., and of the Rangoon Electric Tramway and Supply Co. Ltd.

Colonies, Protectorates, &c.

- Rupert Briercliffe, CMG OBE , Colonial Medical Service, Director of Medical Services, Nigeria.
- Owen Corrie, Colonial Legal Service, Chief Justice, Fiji, and Chief Judicial Commissioner for the Western Pacific.
- Charles Cyril Gerahty, Colonial Legal Service, Chief Justice, Trinidad.
- George Laurie Pile, CBE. For public services in Barbados.

=== Order of the Bath ===
==== Knight Grand Cross of the Order of the Bath (GCB) ====
Military Division

- General Sir William Henry Bartholomew, KCB CMG DSO, Colonel Commandant, Royal Artillery, Aide-de-Camp General to The King, General Officer Commanding-in-Chief, Northern Command.

Civil Division

- The Right Honourable Sir Ronald Charles Lindsay, GCMG KCB CVO, His Majesty's Ambassador Extraordinary and Plenipotentiary at Washington.
- Sir (Samuel) Findlater Stewart, GCIE KCB CSI, Permanent Under-Secretary of State, India Office.

==== Knight Commander of the Order of the Bath (KCB) ====
Military Division

Royal Navy

- Vice-Admiral Charles Edward Kennedy-Purvis, CB.
- Vice-Admiral James Fownes Somerville, CB DSO.
- Surgeon Vice-Admiral Percival Thomas Nicholls, CB MRCS LRCP KHP.

Army

- Lieutenant-General Guy Charles Williams, CB CMG DSO, late Royal Engineers, General Officer Commanding-in-Chief, Eastern Command.
- Lieutenant-General Wellesley Douglas Studholme Brownrigg, CB DSO, late The Sherwood Foresters (Nottinghamshire and Derbyshire Regiment), Military Secretary to the Secretary of State for War, The War Office (Director-General of the Territorial Army, designate).
- Lieutenant-General William Porter MacArthur, CB DSO OBE MD DSc FRCP FRCPI, late Royal Army Medical Corps, Honorary Physician to The King, Director-General, Army Medical Services, The War Office.

Royal Air Force

- Air Marshal Christopher Lloyd Courtney, CB CBE DSO.

Civil Division

- Athol Lancelot Anderson, CB MICE.
- Sir Gerald Bain Canny, KBE CB, Chairman, Board of Inland Revenue.

==== Companion of the Order of the Bath (CB) ====
Military Division

Royal Navy

- Rear-Admiral Henry Daniel Pridham-Wippell, CVO.
- Rear-Admiral Henry Ruthven Moore, CVO DSO.
- Rear-Admiral Richard Bell-Davies, VC DSO AFC.
- Engineer Rear-Admiral Henry Stafford Brockman.
- Captain Harold Martin Burrough, ADC.
- Instructor Captain Arthur Edward Hall, CBE ARCS.
- Paymaster Captain David Sidney Lambert, OBE.

Army

- Major-General Henry Horace Andrews Emerson, DSO MB, retired pay, late Royal Army Medical Corps, late Director of Hygiene, The War Office.
- Major-General Thomas Sheridan Riddell-Webster, DSO, late The Cameronians (Scottish Rifles), Director of Movements and Quartering, The War Office.
- Major-General Augustus Francis Andrew Nicol Thorne, CMG DSO, late Grenadier Guards, General Officer Commanding, London District.
- Major-General Edward Felix Norton, DSO, late Royal Artillery, Commander, Madras District, India.
- Major-General Dudley Graham Johnson, VC DSO MC, late The South Wales Borderers and The North Staffordshire Regiment (The Prince of Wales's), Commander, 4th Division.
- Major-GeneralWilliam Platt, DSO, late The Royal Northumberland Fusiliers, and The Wiltshire Regiment (Duke of Edinburgh's), Major-General Commanding the Troops in the Sudan and Commandant, Sudan Defence Force.
- Major-General John Hedley Thornton Priestman, CBE DSO MC, Colonel, The Lincolnshire Regiment, Commander, 54th (East Anglian) Division, Territorial Army.
- Major-General Laurence Carr, DSO OBE, late The Gordon Highlanders, Director of Staff Duties, The War Office.
- Colonel (honorary Brigadier) John Shann Wilkinson, DSO, retired pay, late The Sherwood Foresters (Nottinghamshire and Derbyshire Regiment).
- Colonel Alan Parry Garnier, MBE MC, late The Royal Northumberland Fusiliers, Assistant Adjutant-General, The War Office.
- Major-General Ian Macpherson Macrae, CIE, Indian Medical Service, Honorary Physician to The King, Deputy Director of Medical Services, Eastern Command, India.
- Colonel (temporary Brigadier) Roland Debenham Inskip, CIE DSO MC, Indian Army, Commander, 1st (Abbottabad) Infantry Brigade, Northern Command, India.
- Major-General Sir Carl Herman Jess, CMG, Australian Staff Corps, Adjutant General, Australian Military Forces.

Royal Air Force

- Air Vice-Marshal Owen Tudor Boyd, OBE MC AFC.
- Air Vice-Marshal Bertine Entwisle Sutton, DSO.

Civil Division

- Honorary Colonel Sir Frank Robert Simpson, Bt TD DL, Chairman, Territorial Army and Air Force Association of the County of Durham.
- Colonel Edwin James King, CMG TD DL ADC, Chairman, Territorial Army and Air Force Association of the County of Middlesex.
- Honorary Colonel John Arthur Saner, VD DL, Vice-Chairman, Territorial Army and Air Force Association of the County of Chester.
- Osmund Somers Cleverly, CVO, lately Principal Private Secretary to the Prime Minister.
- George Frederick Cotton, MVO OBE, Principal Assistant Secretary, Admiralty.
- Robert Norman Duke, DSO MC, Principal Assistant Secretary, Scottish Office.
- Sydney Herbert George Hughes, CBE, Principal Assistant Secretary for Finance and Accountant-General, Ministry of Health.
- George Ismay, Comptroller and Accountant-General, General Post Office.
- Robert Stanford Wood, Principal Assistant Secretary, Office of the Lord Privy Seal.
- Andrew Nicholas Bonaparte-Wyse, CBE, lately Permanent Secretary, Ministry of Education, Northern Ireland.

=== Order of the Star of India ===
==== Knight Commander (KCSI) ====
- His Highness Maharaja Sir Tashi Namgyal, KCIE, Maharaja of Sikkim.

==== Companion (CSI) ====
- Arthur Eric Tylden Pattenson, Member (Traffic), Railway Department (Railway Board), Government of India.
- Edmond Nicolas Blandy, CIE, Indian Civil Service, Officiating Chief Secretary to the Government of Bengal.
- John Francis Sheehy, Indian Civil Service, Member, Central Board of Revenue, Government of India.
- Thomas George Rutherford, CIE, Indian Civil Service, Secretary to the Governor of Madras.
- Raja Mahipal Singh, Raja of Sarila, Central India.
- James Downing Penny, CIE, Indian Civil Service, Chief Secretary to the Government of the Punjab.

=== Order of Saint Michael and Saint George ===
==== Knight Grand Cross of the Order of St Michael and St George (GCMG) ====
- Sir Edward John Harding, KCB KCMG, Permanent Under-Secretary of State, Dominions Office.

==== Knight Commander of the Order of St Michael and St George (KCMG) ====
- The Honourable Richard Layton Butler, formerly Premier of the State of South Australia.
- Vice-Admiral Sir Humphrey Thomas Walwyn, KCSI CB DSO, Royal Navy (Ret'd), Governor and Commander-in-Chief of Newfoundland.
- Henry Charles Donald Cleveland Mackenzie-Kennedy, CMG, Governor and Commander-in-Chief of the Nyasaland Protectorate.
- Eubule John Waddington, CMG OBE, Governor and Commander-in-Chief of Barbados.
- Edward Wilshaw, Chairman and Managing Director, Cable & Wireless
- Major Eric Norman Spencer Crankshaw, CMG MBE, Secretary to the Government Hospitality Fund.
- Thomas Dacre Dunlop, CMG, one of His Majesty's Inspectors-General of Consulates.
- Sir Robert MacLeod Hodgson, KBE CMG. For services rendered while British Agent at Burgos.
- Arnold Edersheim Overton, CMG MC, a Second Secretary, Board of Trade.
- Horace James Seymour, CMG CVO, His Majesty's Envoy Extraordinary and Minister Plenipotentiary at Tehran.

==== Companion of the Order of St Michael and St George (CMG) ====
- Edward Laret Hall, Acting-Puisne Judge, State of Tasmania.
- Norman Rupert Mighell, Chairman of the Repatriation Commission, Commonwealth of Australia.
- Harold John Mitchell, Member of the Oversea Settlement Board.
- Henry Tai Mitchell, of Rotorua, Dominion of New Zealand. For devoted services on the behalf of native races.
- The Honourable Jacob Hendrik Smit, Minister of Finance and Commerce, Southern Rhodesia.
- Frank Gordon Thorpe, MBE, Chairman of the Public Service Board, Commonwealth of Australia.
- Arthur Tyndall, AMInstCE, Under-secretary of the Mines Department and Director of Housing Construction, Dominion of New Zealand.
- Commander George Davies Williams, DSO RD, Royal Naval Reserve (Ret'd), President of the Maritime Services Board, State of New South Wales.
- Robert Daubney, OBE, Colonial Veterinary Service, Director of Veterinary Services, Kenya.
- Harold Frederick Downie, OBE, Assistant Secretary, Colonial Office.
- John Huggins, MC, Colonial Administrative Service, Colonial Secretary, Trinidad.
- Stanley Wilson Jones, Colonial Administrative Service, British Resident, Selangor, Federated Malay States.
- Rene Henry de Solminihac Onraet, Colonial Police Service, Inspector-General of Police, Straits Settlements.
- John Robert Patterson, Colonial Administrative Service, Senior Resident, Nigeria.
- Lieutenant-Colonel Frederick Gerald Peake, CBE, Officer Commanding the Arab Legion, Trans-Jordan.
- Ralph Roylance Scott, MC MB BS, Colonial Medical Service, Director of Medical services, Tanganyika Territory.
- Christopher James Wilson, MC . For public services in Kenya.
- Guy Stanley Wodeman, Colonial Administrative Service, Deputy Chief Secretary, Ceylon.
- Charles William Baxter, MC, an Acting Counsellor in the Foreign Office.
- Major Archibald Robert Boyle, OBE MC, Deputy Director of the Intelligence Section, Air Ministry.
- Captain Vyvyan Holt, MVO, Oriental Secretary at His Majesty's Embassy at Baghdad.
- Maurice Jeffes, Director of the Passport Control Department.
- Colonel Gilbert Mackereth, MC, His Majesty's Consul at Damascus.
- William Ridsdale, Assistant Press Officer in the Foreign Office.
- Edward Henry Gerald Shepherd, His Majesty's Consul-General at Danzig.
- Major Malcolm Louis Woollcombe, OBE. For services rendered to the Foreign Office.

=== Order of the Indian Empire ===
==== Knight Commander (KCIE) ====
- Sir James Braid Taylor, CIE, Indian Civil Service (Ret'd), Governor of the Reserve Bank of India.
- Sir James Scott Pitkeathly, CMG CIE CVO CBE DSO, lately Chief Controller, Indian Stores Department, Government of India.
- Stuart Kelson Brown, CB CVO, Assistant Under-Secretary of State for India.

==== Companion (CIE) ====
- Charles Gordon Herbert, Indian Political Service, Joint Secretary in the Political Department.
- Narayan Raghavan Pillai, CBE, Indian Civil Service, Joint Secretary to the Government of India in the Department of Commerce.
- Colonel (Temporary Brigadier) William Henry Roberts, DSO OBE MC, British Service, Chief Engineer, Northern Command, India.
- Brigadier Harold Evelyn William Bell Kingsley, DSO ADC, Indian Army, Commandant, Indian Military Academy, Dehra Dun.
- Colonel (Temporary Brigadier) Arthur Richard Ogilvie Mallock, Indian Army, Commander, 12th (Secunderabad) Infantry Brigade.
- Lieutenant-Colonel Kenmure Alick Garth Evans-Gordon, Indian Political Service, Resident for Kolhapur and the Deccan States.
- Keith Cantlie, Indian Civil Service, Officiating Commissioner, Surma Valley and Hill Division, Assam.
- Diwan Bahadur Chettur Govindan Nair, Judicial Secretary and Legal Remembrancer to the Government of Orissa.
- Christopher Hughes Masterman, Indian Civil Service, lately Secretary to the Government of Madras in the Education and Public Health Department.
- John Coote Donaldson, MC, Indian Civil Service, Secretary to the Governor of the United Provinces.
- Jnanankur De, Indian Civil Service, First Land Acquisition Collector, Calcutta, Bengal.
- Cuthbert Eustace Connop Cox, Indian Forest Service, Chief Conservator of Forests, Central Provinces and Berar.
- Herbert Ray Stewart, FRCScI DIC NDA, Indian Agricultural Service, Director of Agriculture, Punjab.
- Colonel Richard Henry Wilson, MC, Inspecting Officer, Frontier Corps, North-West Frontier Province.
- Marmaduke Robert Coburn, Military Accountant-General.
- John Mackinnon, Chief Engineer, North Western Railway.
- Evelyn Arthur Smythies, Indian Forest Service, Chief Conservator of Forests, United Provinces.
- William John Jenkins, Indian Agricultural Service, Officiating Director of Agriculture, Bombay.
- Walter Graham Lacey, Indian Civil Service, Secretary to the Governor of Bihar.
- Edmund Bryan Jones, Indian Police, Deputy Inspector-General of Police, Bengal.
- John Thorne Masey Bennett, CBE MC, Indian Police, Deputy Inspector General of Police, Criminal Investigation Department, Punjab.
- Lieutenant-Colonel Robert Forrester Douglas MacGregor, MC, Indian Medical Service, Residency Surgeon, Hyderabad (Deccan).
- Lieutenant-Colonel Frederick Jasper Anderson, MC MBBS (London) LRCP (London) FRCS (Eng.), Indian Medical Service, Professor of Surgery, Medical College, Calcutta, Bengal.
- Lieutenant-Colonel Thomas Francis Henry Kelly, OBE, Military Secretary to the Governor of Madras.
- Charles George Hawes, MC, Indian Service of Engineers, Officiating Superintending Engineer, Northern Sind Circle, Sind.
- John Edward Pedley, MC, Indian Civil Service, Collector, Gorakhpur, United Provinces.
- Herbert Tower Sorley, Indian Civil Service, Collector of Bombay.
- Philip Crawford Vickery, OBE, Indian Police, Superintendent of Police, Punjab.
- John Thomas Donovan, Indian Civil Service, Bengal.

=== Royal Victorian Order ===
==== Knight Grand Cross of the Royal Victorian Order (GCVO) ====
- The Right Honourable Sir Eric Clare Edmund Phipps, GCMG CVO. (dated 21 March 1939).
- The Right Honourable George Herbert Hyde, Earl of Clarendon, KG GCMG.
- Sir John Weir, KCVO.

==== Dame Commander of the Royal Victorian Order (DCVO) ====
- Mary Frances, Baroness Elphinstone.

==== Knight Commander of the Royal Victorian Order (KCVO) ====
- Captain Henry Rainald, Viscount Gage (dated 10 April 1939).
- Alan Frederick Lascelles, CB GCVO MVO MC.
- George Arthur Ponsonby, CVO.

==== Commander of the Royal Victorian Order (CVO) ====
- Thomas Sidney Chegwidden
- Major Harry William Ralph Ricardo.
- George Frederick Steward, CBE.

==== Member of the Royal Victorian Order, 4th class (MVO) ====
- Major The Honourable Christopher Bromhead Birdwood.
- Charles Morris Corner
- Janet Aird Ross Harkness.
- The Reverend Francis Joseph Stone.
- George Harry Williams, MVO.

==== Member of the Royal Victorian Order, 5th class (MVO) ====
- Lieutenant (E) John Henry Gilbert, Royal Navy. (dated 10 January 1939).
- Frederick Joseph Bone, MusBac FRCO.
- Bernard Parkes.

=== Order of the British Empire ===
==== Knight Grand Cross of the Order of the British Empire (GBE) ====
Military Division

- Engineer Vice-Admiral Sir Harold Arthur Brown, KCB, (Ret'd), Director-General of Munitions Production, The War Office.

Civil Division

- John Scott, Baron Hyndley. For public services.
- His Highness Maharaja Shri Sir Lakhdhirji Waghji, KCSI, Maharaja of Morvi, Western Indian States Agency.

==== Knight Commander of the Order of the British Empire (KBE) ====
Military Division

- Vice-Admiral Cecil Ponsonby Talbot, CB DSO (Ret'd).
- Air Vice-Marshal Albert Victor John Richardson, CB OBE MB BCh DPH KHS, Royal Air Force.

Civil Division

- Bernard Dudley Frank Docker, JP. Chairman of Westminster Hospital.
- Colonel the Honourable Maurice Charles Andrew Drummond, CMG DSO, Deputy Commissioner, Metropolitan Police.
- (Crawfurd) Wilfrid Griffin Eady, CB CMG, Deputy Under-Secretary of State, Home Office.
- Geoffrey Kelsall Peto, CBE, Chairman of the Food Council. For public services.
- John Ritchie Richmond, CBE. For political and public services in Glasgow.
- Alfred Theodore Vaughan Robinson, CB CBE, Second Secretary, Ministry of Transport.
- (Albert) Henry Self, CB, Deputy Under-Secretary of State, Air Ministry.
- Annesley Ashworth Somerville, VD JP MP, Member of Parliament for Windsor since 1922. For political and public services.
- Henry Fitzmaurice, CMG MBE, His Majesty's Consul-General at Batavia.
- James Angus Gillan, Civil Secretary to the Sudan Government.
- The Honourable George Stephenson Beeby, Chief Judge of the Court of Conciliation and Arbitration, Commonwealth of Australia.
- Professor William Blaxland Benham, CM DSc MA FRS, Emeritus Professor of Biology, University of Otago, Dominion of New Zealand.
- Professor Thomas Alexander Hunter, , Professor of Philosophy and Psychology, Victoria College, University of New Zealand.
- The Honourable Percival Halse Rogers, BCL, Judge of the Supreme Court, and Chancellor of the University of Sydney, in the State of New South Wales.
- Captain Donald Petrie Simson, CBE, Honorary Secretary, British Empire Services League.

==== Commander of the Order of the British Empire (CBE) ====
Military Division

Royal Navy

- Rear-Admiral George Pirie Thomson, OBE. (Ret'd).
- Rear-Admiral William Scott Chalmers, DSC. (Ret'd).
- Surgeon Captain Leonard Darby, MB ChB, Royal Australian Navy.

Army

- Colonel John Inglis Chrystall, MC, late 13th/18th Royal Hussars (Queen Mary's Own), Officer Commanding Trans-Jordan Frontier Force.
- Colonel Ernest Marshall Cowell, DSO TD FRCS, Territorial Army, Assistant Director of Medical Services, 44th (Home Counties) Division, Territorial Army.
- Colonel Arthur Crookenden, DSO, retired pay, Colonel, The Cheshire Regiment.
- Colonel Roger Errington, MC TD MD, Territorial Army, Assistant Director of Medical Services, 50th (Northumbrian) Division, Territorial Army.
- Lieutenant-Colonel and Brevet Colonel (temporary Colonel) Alexander Hood, MD, Royal Army Medical Corps, Deputy Director of Medical Services, British Forces in Palestine and Trans-Jordan.
- Colonel Charles John Stuart King, OBE, late Royal Engineers, Chief Engineer, Quetta Reconstruction, Western (Independent) District, India.
- Colonel David Ogilvy Wight Lamb, OBE, Indian Army, Inspector, Quarter-Master General's Branch (Assistant Quarter-Master General), British Advisory Military Mission attached to the Iraq Army.
- Lieutenant-Colonel and Brevet Colonel John Jestyn Llewellin, OBE MC TD MP, Dorsetshire Heavy Regiment, Royal Artillery, Territorial Army.
- Colonel (temporary Brigadier) James Ogilvy Shepherd, MC TD, Territorial Army, Commanding, Royal Artillery, 51st (Highland) Division, Territorial Army.
- Colonel (temporary Brigadier) George William Sutton, DSO TD, Territorial Army, Commander, 125th (Lancashire Fusiliers) Infantry Brigade, Territorial Army.
- Colonel Francis Peter Vidal, OBE, retired pay, late Royal Army Pay Corps, late Command Paymaster, Southern Command.
- Lieutenant-Colonel and Brevet Colonel George Cradock Wickins, TD, Royal Corps of Signals, Territorial Army, Deputy Chief Signal Officer for Territorial Army duties, 1st Anti-Aircraft Corps, Territorial Army.
- Colonel (temporary Brigadier) Harry Willans, DSO MC TD, Territorial Army, Commander, 2nd (London) Infantry Brigade, Territorial Army.

Royal Air Force

- Group Captain Ivor Thomas Lloyd.
- Wing Commander Arthur Hyde Flower.

Civil Division

- Cyril Bailey, MBE FBA, Chairman of the Oxford Juvenile Advisory Committee.
- Robert Francis Barclay,, Chairman of the Royal Hospital for Sick Children, Glasgow.
- Reginald Beddington, OBE, President of the National Association of Fishery Boards.
- John William Bowen, JP. For services to the Air Ministry.
- Angus Dudley Campbell, Member of the Executive Committee of the India Section of the Manchester Chamber of Commerce.
- Alexander Wishart Christie, JP. For political and public services in Aberdeenshire.
- Arthur Sambell Cox, OBE, Assistant Comptroller, Patent Office, Board of Trade.
- Gertrude Annie, Lady Worthington-Evans. For political and public services.
- Leah Norah Folland, JP. For political and public services in South Wales.
- Seton Gordon. For services to literature and natural history.
- Cecil Augustus Charles John Hendriks, MC, Private Secretary to the Lord President of the Council.
- Archer Hoare, Collector, London Port, Board of Customs and Excise.
- Ada Frances, Lady Mather-Jackson, OBE JP, Secretary of the Nursing Association in South Wales and Monmouthshire.
- Robert Dixon Kingham, OBE, Secretary, National Savings Committee.
- Reginald Armitage Ledgard, OBE, Accountant-General, Ministry of Pensions.
- Charles Edward Legat. For services to the Empire Forestry Association.
- Charles Henry Le Grice, JP. For political and public services in Cornwall.
- Edmund George Marlow, OBE, Deputy Accountant-General, Ministry of Labour.
- Alfred Marnham, JP, Chairman of the Hemel Hempstead Rural District Council.
- Joan, the Honourable Mrs Marsham, OBE. For services to the Personal Service League.
- John Storer Nicholl, Member of the Transport Advisory Council.
- Roland Tennyson Peel, MC, Assistant Secretary, India Office.
- Major Charles Evelyn Pym, OBE JP DL, Vice-Chairman of the Kent County Council.
- Robert Lewis Roberts, Chairman of the Governors of the Northern Polytechnic, London.
- Professor Edward James Salisbury, FRS, Quain Professor of Botany, University of London.
- Otto Moritz Schiff, OBE, Chairman of the German Jewish Aid Committee.
- Charles William Sleigh, JP, Chairman of the Aberdeen County Council Education Committee.
- Dorothy Spencer. For political services.
- James Watt, AMInstCE FSI, Chief Valuer, Scotland, Board of Inland Revenue.
- James Arthur Wilson, OBE, Chief Constable of Cardiff.
- Cornelia Bonté Sheldon Elgood, a British subject resident in Cairo.
- Henry Noble Hall, a British subject resident in Paris.
- Arthur Henry William King, OBE, His Majesty's Consul at Lisbon.
- Alexander Frank Noel Thavenot, Judicial Adviser to the Siamese Ministry of Justice.
- Percy William Weaver, MBE, formerly Traffic Manager, Egyptian State Railways, Egypt.
- George Davy Balsille, AMIE (Aust.), Director of Public Works, State of Tasmania.
- Robert Alexander Fletcher. For public services in Southern Rhodesia.
- Norman Edwin Hutchings, Assistant Under-Secretary, Public Works Department, Dominion of New Zealand.
- Gregory Macalister Mathews, FRSE, a prominent ornithologist. For services to the Commonwealth of Australia.
- Albert Ernest Rudder, special representative of Imperial Airways in the Commonwealth of Australia, and Vice-Chairman of the Board of Directors of Qantas Empire Airways.
- Herbert John Russell, General Manager of the Newfoundland Railway.
- William Forster Woods, Chairman of the Stock Exchange of Melbourne, State of Victoria.
- Dhirendra Nath Mitra, Solicitor to the Government of India, Legal Adviser to the King-Emperor's Anti-Tuberculosis Fund Appeal.
- Khan Bahadur Shaikh Muhammad Ismail, Honorary Magistrate and Landlord, Rawalpindi, Punjab.
- John Humphrey Wise, Indian Civil Service, Secretary to the Government of Burma, Department of Commerce and Industry.
- Richard Charles Alexander Cavendish, Colonial Police Service, Commissioner of Police, Kenya.
- Arthur Marcelles de Silva, FRCS LRCP, Senior Surgeon, General Hospital, Ceylon.
- Duncan MacGregor. For public services in Uganda Protectorate.
- John Phillips Mead, Colonial Forest Service, Director of Forestry, Straits Settlements, and Adviser on Forestry, Malay States.
- Mehmet Munir, OBE. For public services in Cyprus.
- Lieutenant-Colonel Arthur Stephenson, CMG DSO MC. For public services in Northern Rhodesia.
- Ratu Joseva Lalabalavu Vanaaliali Sukuna, Colonial Administrative Service, District Commissioner and Chief Assistant, Native Lands Commission, Fiji.

Honorary Commander

- Adeyemo Alakija. For public services in Nigeria.

==== Officer of the Order of the British Empire (OBE) ====
Military Division

Royal Navy

- Commander Henry Thurston Wake Pawsey.
- Engineer Commander William John Shute, (Ret'd).
- Headmaster Commander Arthur David Lewis, MBE BSc.
- Lieutenant-Colonel Eric James Banks Noyes, Royal Marines.
- Lieutenant-Commander Charles Ralfe Thompson.
- Lieutenant-Commander Geoffrey St. John Aldersey Taylor.
- Engineer Commander Clarence Walter Bridge, Royal Australian Navy.

Army

- Lieutenant-Colonel and Brevet-Colonel John Seddon Barton, MC TD, late Officer Commanding 61st Carnarvon and Denbigh (Yeomanry) Medium Regiment, Royal Artillery, Territorial Army.
- Major Geoffrey Benson, 2nd Battalion, The Royal Ulster Rifles.
- Lieutenant-Colonel and Brevet-Colonel Eric Gore-Browne, DSO TD ADC, The Leicestershire Yeomanry (Prince Albert's Own), Territorial Army.
- Major Archibald Pennant Campbell, Royal Artillery, General Staff Officer, 2nd Grade, Headquarters, The British Troops in Egypt.
- Lieutenant-Colonel and Brevet-Colonel John Campbell, MBE TD, Officer Commanding, Air Formation Signals, Royal Corps of Signals, Supplementary Reserve.
- Major Peter Ranalphus Walter Carthew, late Officer Commanding Malvern College Contingent, Junior Division, Officers Training Corps (Captain, Regular Army Reserve of Officers).
- Lieutenant-Colonel Henry John Chappell, MC TD, Officer Commanding, Tower Hamlets Rifles, The Rifle Brigade (Prince Consort's Own), Territorial Army.
- Major James McIntosh Clark, Officer Commanding, Jamaica Militia Artillery.
- Lieutenant-Colonel Alfred George Robert Coward, Officer Commanding, 28th (Essex) Anti-Aircraft Battalion, Royal Engineers, Territorial Army.
- Major Charles Beevor Harty Delamain, MC, Royal Artillery, Brigade Major, Tianjin Area, British Troops in China.
- Lieutenant-Colonel George Douglas Alexander Fletcher, MC ED, Reserve of Officers, Straits Settlements Volunteer Force, late Officer Commanding Penang and Province Wellesley Volunteer Corps, Straits Settlements Volunteer Force.
- Lieutenant-Colonel and Brevet-Colonel Richard Cunningham Foot,MC TD, Officer Commanding, 35th (First Surrey Rifles) Anti-Aircraft Battalion, Royal Engineers, Territorial Army.
- Colonel Michael Arthur Green, MC, late The Gloucestershire Regiment and The Northamptonshire Regiment, Commandant, The Gold Coast Regiment, Royal West African Frontier Force, and Inspector of the Local Forces.
- Lieutenant-Colonel Stanley Wakefield Harris, Officer Commanding, 105th (Bedfordshire Yeomanry) Army Field Regiment, Royal Artillery, Territorial Army.
- Lieutenant-Colonel Frederick John Bernard Hastings, Royal Engineers (Indian Army).
- Major Joseph Charles Haydon, Irish Guards, Military Assistant to the Secretary of State for War, The War Office.
- Lieutenant-Colonel and Brevet-Colonel Norman Scotson Henshaw, MC TD Officer Commanding, 55th (West Lancashire) Divisional Engineers, Royal Engineers, Territorial Army.
- Lieutenant-Colonel Arthur Henry Cecil Hope, TD, Officer Commanding, 4th/5th Battalion (Queen's Edinburgh) (52nd Searchlight Regiment) The Royal Scots (The Royal Regiment), Territorial Army.
- Lieutenant-Colonel John Drummond Inglis, MC, Royal Engineers, Commander, Royal Engineers, British Forces in Palestine and Trans-Jordan.
- Major Frederick Low Johnston, 1st Battalion, The Royal Scots (The Royal Regiment).
- Lieutenant-Colonel and Brevet-Colonel Frank Hamer Lawrence, MC TD, late Officer Commanding, 68th (South Midland) Field Regiment, Royal Artillery, Territorial Army.
- Major (Ordnance Officer, 3rd Class) Thomas Paul Lilly, Royal Army Ordnance Corps.
- Major (local Lieutenant-Colonel) Darell Kilburn Paris, MC, Royal Artillery, Military Attaché, Brussels and the Hague.
- Lieutenant-Colonel Alfred Howard Read, TD MEng AMIEE, Officer Commanding 44th (Home Counties) Divisional Signals, Royal Corps of Signals, Territorial Army.
- Major and Brevet-Lieutenant-Colonel Edgar Platt Readman, Royal Army Ordnance Corps, Territorial Army, Deputy Assistant Director of Ordnance Services, 49th (West Riding) Division, Territorial Army.
- Lieutenant-Colonel Victor Owen Robinson, MC TD, Officer Commanding, 40th (The Sherwood Foresters) Anti-Aircraft Battalion, Royal Engineers, Territorial Army.
- Lieutenant-Colonel and Brevet-Colonel Christopher Bell Sherriff, TD, Territorial Army Reserve of Officers, late Officer Commanding, 7th Battalion, The Argyll and Sutherland Highlanders (Princess Louise's), Territorial Army.
- Major (local Lieutenant-Colonel) Reginald Herbert Ryrie Steward, MC, Royal Corps of Signals, Officer Commanding Signals, British Forces in Palestine and Trans-Jordan.
- Local Lieutenant-Colonel Victor Albert Strallen, Commandant and Chief Instructor, Chemical Warfare School, India (Captain, Ret'd, late Regular Army Reserve of Officers, Royal Engineers).
- Major Richard Lloyd Travers, 2nd Battalion, The Queen's Own Royal West Kent Regiment.
- Lieutenant-Colonel and Brevet Colonel Arthur Westfield Ward-Walker, TD, Officer Commanding, 45th (The Royal Warwickshire Regiment) Anti-Aircraft Battalion, Royal Engineers, Territorial Army.
- Major (Brevet Lieutenant-Colonel) Thomas Edgar Weavers, Australian Staff Corps, Director of Mobilization, Rifle Associations and Rifle Clubs, Army Headquarters, Australian Military Forces.
- Major Walter John Williams, MC, 1st Anti-Aircraft Divisional Royal Army Service Corps, Territorial Army.
- Lieutenant-Colonel and Brevet Colonel Godfrey Charles Wycisk, TD, Officer Commanding, 5th (Prince of Wales's) Battalion, The Devonshire Regiment, Territorial Army.

Royal Air Force

- Wing Commander Edward Derek Davis.
- Wing Commander George Stairs Napier Johnston.
- Wing Commander Edward Barker Addison.
- Wing Commander (now Group Captain) William James-King, DCM.
- Squadron Leader Harold Featherstone Luck.
- Wing Commander John Hamilton Summers, Royal Australian Air Force.
- Flight Lieutenant Cyril Eyton Kay, Royal New Zealand Air Force.

Civil Division

- Harry Kershaw Ainsworth, MBE, Head of Branch, Insurance Department, Ministry of Health.
- David Baldie, Chief Constable, Kirkcaldy Burgh Police Force.
- Alderman Edwin Alec Blaxill, JP, Mayor of Colchester. Chairman of the Colchester Education Committee.
- Harold Bostock, Principal Clerk, Principal Probate Registry, Supreme Court of Judicature.
- James Brierley, AMInstCE, Engineering Inspector, Grade I, Ministry of Transport.
- Alderman Frederick Inchbold Butterworth, JP. For political and public services in Huddersfield.
- Stanley John Campling, Chief Clerk, Bankruptcy Department, Board of Trade.
- Joy Mary Barbara Carey, MBE, Private Secretary to the Permanent Secretary, HM Treasury.
- William George Chapman, Assistant King's Proctor, Department of HM Procurator General and Treasury Solicitor.
- Edward John Clarke. For political and public services in the Hartlepools.
- Philip Bartlett Coles, HM Inspector of Schools.
- Charles Chenevix Coote, Air Raid Precautions Officer for the North Eastern Electric Supply Company Ltd.
- Joseph Thomas Davis, Member of the Council for Art and Industry. A Director of the Co-operative Wholesale Society.
- George Purves Douglas, MC , Assistant Superintendent (Research), Royal Aircraft Establishment, Farnborough.
- Gwendoline Whitelaw England. For political and public services in Llandaff and Barry.
- Clementina Esslemont. For services to child welfare in Aberdeen.
- William Ernest Fisher, DSc AMIMechE, Principal, Wolverhampton Technical College.
- Victor Edward Flowerday, Commander (First Class), British Airways Ltd.
- William Fowell. For political and public services in Fulham.
- Commander Ivan Bromhead Franks, Royal Navy. (Retd.), Director of the Air Raid Precautions Staff School.
- James Main Garrow, Assistant Chief Constable, Derbyshire.
- Ewing Gilfillan, MBE, County Inspector, Royal Ulster Constabulary.
- Robina Martin Glen, District Officer, London, Unemployment Assistance Board.
- Evelyn Gladys Gordon, MBE JP. For political and public services in Banffshire.
- William Fergus Graham, JP, Chairman of the Local Advisory Committee for the Gretna State Management Scheme.
- Frank Grant, MBE, Principal, Ministry of Agriculture and Fisheries.
- Albert Winter Gray, Secretary, Institute of Transport.
- Hugh Arrowsmith Grierson, MC MB BS, Senior Medical Officer, HM Prison Brixton.
- Muriel Grieve. For political services in Scotland.
- Ethel Mary Hall. For political services in Bristol.
- James Hamilton, Superintending Inspector, Board of Customs and Excise.
- Thomas David Harris. For political and public services in Tonbridge.
- Professor Percy John Heawood, DCL, Honorary Secretary and Treasurer of the Committee of the Durham Cathedral Preservation Fund.
- Martin Spencer Hill, Joint Secretary and Treasurer of the Liverpool Steam Ship Owners' Association.
- Herbert Rol and Hodges, Principal, Ministry of Labour.
- Alderman Alfred James Howcroft, JP. For political and public services in Oldham.
- Herbert John Humphrys, DSO MC, HM Divisional Inspector of Mines, Yorkshire Division.
- Hubert Anderson Mackintosh Hutber, Deputy Controller and Secretary, Clearing Offices.
- Major Reginald Herbert Jerman, MC, Clerk of the Wandsworth Borough Council, Air Raid Precautions Officer for Wandsworth.
- Albert Smedley Judson, MBE, Inspector of Branches, Export Credits Guarantee Department.
- Mary Honor Keating, Organiser to the National Council for Maternity and Child Welfare.
- Anne Keith, Superintendent, Accountant General's Department, General Post Office.
- Roy Alan Lewis, DCM, lately Honorary Treasurer of the National Council of Social Services.
- Arthur Godfrey Lias. For political and public services.
- Alderman Arthur William Lyne, JP, Mayor of Northampton, Chairman of Northampton Local Employment Committee.
- The Reverend Robert Paton McAuliffe, Warden of the Philanthropic Society's School.
- Derek Ivor Breashur McCulloch, Director of the Children's Hour, British Broadcasting Corporation.
- Bertram Charles Percival Park, MBE, Commandant, Metropolitan Special Constabulary.
- James Leo Parry, Telephone Manager, Birmingham Telephone Area, General Post Office.
- William George Rogerson Paterson, Principal and Professor of Agriculture, West of Scotland Agricultural College, Glasgow.
- George Henry Pattinson, JP, Chairman of the Cumberland and Westmorland Agricultural Wages Committee.
- Councillor George Edward Henry Prince, Chairman of the Southampton Air Raid Precautions Committee.
- Lieutenant-Colonel Evan Thomas Rees, DSO MC, Education Officer, Air Ministry.
- Katherine Roberts, Honorary Treasurer, Merioneth Voluntary Orthopaedic Association.
- William Robertson, Chairman of the Glasgow Central Juvenile Advisory Committee.
- Lucie Evelyn Savill, Head Mistress of Christ's Hospital Girls' High School, Lincoln.
- Walter Percy Sawyer, Senior Inspector of Taxes, Board of Inland Revenue.
- Charles Wilfred Seward, JP, Chairman of the Petersfield Rural District Council.
- Catharine Somers, JP. For political and public services in Merionethshire.
- Alderman Emanuel Spence, JP. For services to Middlesbrough.
- Herbert William Spencer, Principal, HM Office of Works and Public Buildings.
- Alderman George Spurgen, JP. For services to education in Folkestone.
- Margaret Stansfeld, President of the Association of Principals of Women's Physical Training Colleges.
- Mabel Elizabeth, Lady Stirling, JP. For public and social services in Stirlingshire.
- Stephen Bradley Stokes, Senior Auditor, National Insurance Audit Department.
- David Stanley Todd, lately Director of Printing and Binding, HM Stationery Office.
- Reginald Hunt Tootill, MB ChB MRCS LRCP. For political and public services in Urmston, Manchester.
- William Harold Tuckey, Chief Technical Officer, Fire Offices' Committee.
- Henry Scurrah Wainwright, FCA, Chairman, Leeds and District Advisory Committee, Unemployment Assistance Board.
- Frederick Walker. For political services in Leeds.
- Lavinia Edna Walter, MBE, Member of the Schools Advisory Sub-Committee, National Savings Committee.
- Ernest Watt, MD DSc MRCP(Ed) DPH, Medical Officer, Department of Health for Scotland.
- Montague Harold Way, MRCS LRCP JP. For political and public services in Portsmouth.
- James Rankine Wilson, JP. For political and public services in East Lothian.
- Henry James Perry Anderson, Chairman of the Kulangsu Municipal Council, China.
- Frank Stannard Gibbs, His Majesty's Consul, Addis Ababa.
- John Moncaster Ley Mitcheson, Commercial Counsellor at His Majesty's Embassy at Warsaw.
- Robert Ross, His Majesty's Consul at Chicago.
- Lucy Emma Sergeant, Matron of the University Group of Hospitals in Cairo.
- Oliver Smalley, His Majesty's Consul at Pittsburgh.
- Edmund Osborn Springfield, Commissioner, Port Sudan.
- Henry Charles Thompson, a British subject resident in Buenos Aires.
- Janet Rhoda Barr,, formerly Principal of the Girls' High School, Timaru, Dominion of New Zealand.
- Oswin Boys Bull, MA, Director of Education, Basutoland.
- Lady Sibyl Chauvel. For social welfare services in the State of Victoria.
- Archer Cust, Secretary, Royal Empire Society.
- Ethel Annie Doggett, MBE, Secretary, League of the Empire.
- George Alexander Clarence Douglas, MS MB. For social welfare services in the Commonwealth of Australia.
- Edward John Fairnie. For public services in Geelong, State of Victoria.
- George Alfred Gahan, Railways Commissioner, Commonwealth of Australia.
- Mother Mary Gonzaga, Matron of Mater Misericordiae Hospital, Auckland, Dominion of New Zealand.
- Colonel William Douthwaite Holgate, of Auckland, Dominion of New Zealand. For public services.
- Alexander Sydney Joske, MD ChB, President of the Medical Board, State of Victoria.
- Robert Lawson, MIE (Aust.), Chief Engineer, Postmaster-General's Department, Commonwealth of Australia.
- Arthur Nelson Littlejohn. For public services in the State of New South Wales.
- Henry Hector McFie. For public services in the Commonwealth of Australia.
- Richard John Murphy, Chief Clerk and Industrial Officer, Defence Department, Commonwealth of Australia.
- Gerald Enraght Nettelton, District Officer, Bechuanaland Protectorate, seconded for duty in the Secretariat at Mafeking.
- Vallance Meikle Stewart, formerly a Member of the European Advisory Council, Swaziland. For public services.
- Florence Mary Taylor, ARAIA, a prominent architect and structural engineer in the Commonwealth of Australia.
- Alexander Robert Thomson. For public services in Southern Rhodesia.
- Keith Hampden Todd, JP. For services to ex-servicemen in the Commonwealth of Australia.
- Arthur Albert Topp, AIC, Manager of the Government Explosives Factory, Maribyrnong, Commonwealth of Australia.
- Jack Turner, MC, Forestry Officer, Department of Natural Resources, Newfoundland.
- Bertrand James Waterhouse, FRIBA, President, Board of Architects, State of New South Wales.
- Ethel Chamier, Indian Educational Service (Women's Branch), Inspectress of Schools, Jubbulpore Circle, Central Provinces and Berar.
- Rai Bahadur Pandit Suraj Din Bajpai, Deputy Secretary to the Government of the United Provinces in the Finance Department.
- Edward John Bruen, Indian Agricultural Service, Livestock Expert to the Government of Bombay.
- Arthur Charles Carter, Indian Police, Assistant to the Inspector-General of Police, Bihar.
- Akhil Chandra Chatterjee, Railway Concentration Officer, Quartermaster-General's Branch, Army Headquarters, India.
- Major Bijeta Chaudhuri, Indian Medical Service, Senior Medical Officer, Port Blair.
- Major Richard Alfred Cropper, 17th Dogra Regiment, Commandant, Gilgit Corps of Scouts, Gilgit Agency.
- The Reverend Edward Macey Evans, Member of the Orissa Legislative Assembly and Missionary, Gumsur Udayagiri, Ganjam District, Orissa.
- Leslie Benton Green, MBE, Director of Industries, Madras.
- Eric Bertram Wood Grindal, Indian Audit and Accounts Service, Comptroller, Sind.
- David Arnold Howell, MInstCE MIMechE, Superintending Engineer, Public Health Circle, Punjab.
- John Barclay McBride, AMIMechE, Chief Inspector of Factories, Bengal.
- Major Sahibzada Syed Iskander Ali Mirza, Indian Political Service, Political Agent, Khyber Agency, North-West Frontier Province.
- Herbert Francis Mooney, Forest Officer, Eastern States Agency.
- George Bond Morton, Bird & Co., Calcutta, Bengal.
- Ammembal Vittal Pai, Indian Civil Service, Agent of the Government of India in Ceylon.
- Henry Richard Rishworth, Principal Medical and Health Officer, Great Indian Peninsula Railway.
- Lieutenant-Commander William Hutcheson Watt, Royal Naval Reserve (Ret'd), Chief Aerodrome Officer, Civil Aviation Directorate, India.
- David Thomas Mitchell, MRCVS, Director of Veterinary services, Burma.
- Abraham Christopher Gregory Suriarachchi Amarasekara. For services to art in Ceylon.
- Arthur Leopold Armstrong, Colonial Administrative Service, Agent and Consul, Tonga, Western Pacific.
- The Venerable Harry Bowers, Archdeacon of Uganda. For public and social services in Uganda Protectorate.
- Thomas Dempster Cranston, Colonial Education Service, Assistant Director of Education, Gold Coast.
- Henry Dow. For public services in Trinidad.
- Professor Kenneth Hutchinson Digby, MB BS FRCS LRCP. For medical services in Hong Kong.
- Joseph Hobbs, Colonial Customs Service, Deputy Comptroller of Customs, Federated Malay States.
- John Perry Jones, Colonial Administrative Service, Provincial Commissioner, Zanzibar.
- Malcolm Buchanan Laing Commissioner of Labour and Local Government, British Guiana.
- Harold Ernest Lambert, Colonial Administrative Service, District Officer, Kenya.
- Francis Pallent Leathes, Colonial Police Service, Deputy Commissioner of Police, Tanganyika Territory.
- Clement Malone. For public services in the Leeward Islands.
- Kenneth Sefton Martin, Colonial Customs Service, Deputy Comptroller of Customs, Nigeria.
- Robert Hood Orr. For public services in Northern Rhodesia.
- Major Kenneth Macaulay Papworth, MC, Royal Engineers, Officer-in-charge of the British Guiana Brazil Boundary Commission.
- Peter George Russo. For public services in Gibraltar.
- Captain Basil William Seager, Colonial Administrative Service, Political Officer, Aden.
- Engineer Lieutenant-Commander James Mime Simpson, Royal Navy (Ret'd), Chief Engineer, Marine Department, Gambia.
- John Sinclair. For services to agriculture in the Nyasaland Protectorate.
- Ivo Herbert Evelyn Joseph Stourton, Colonial Police Service, Commissioner of Police, Bermuda.
- George Childs Thompson, Resident Engineer, Haifa Harbour Works Department, Palestine.
- John Sydney Truphet, Head of the Shipping Department, Crown Agents for the Colonies.
- Donald Percy Wailling, MRCS LRCP, Commissioner and Medical Officer, Virgin Islands.
- Charles Henderson Ward, Colonial Police Service, Superintendent of Police, Nigeria.
- John Joseph Warren, Colonial Customs Service, Senior Deputy Commissioner of Excise, Straits Settlements.

==== Member of the Order of the British Empire (MBE) ====
Military Division

Royal Navy

- Lieutenant William Henry Lawrence.
- Lieutenant (E) William Andrew Frost, (Ret'd).
- Commissioned Gunner Alfred Harold Turton.
- Commissioned Engineer James Barlow Newton.
- Commissioned Engineer Albert John Lee.
- Signal Boatswain Norman Stark Balfour, Royal Naval Volunteer Reserve.
- Lieutenant (E) Frederick John Raymont, Royal Australian Navy.
- Senior Master John Arthur Gloury, Royal Australian Navy.
- Commissioned Writer John Xavier Scares, Royal Indian Navy.

Army

- Major Edward Reginald Carey Ames, TD, 3rd Survey Regiment, Royal Artillery, Territorial Army (Captain, Regular Army Reserve of Officers).
- Subadar Ghulam Akbar Babar, Royal Indian Army Service Corps.
- Captain Arthur Norman Bagshaw, The Northern Rhodesia Regiment (Captain, Regular Army Reserve of Officers, General List).
- Major John Balderstone, 79th (Lowland) Field Regiment, Royal Artillery, Territorial Army (Captain, Regular Army Reserve of Officers).
- The Venerable Arthur Selwyn Bean,, Chaplain to the Forces, 3rd Class, Royal Army Chaplains' Department, Territorial Army.
- No.3302874 Warrant Officer, Class II (Company Sergeant-Major) David Bone, 5th Battalion, The Highland Light Infantry (City of Glasgow Regiment), Territorial Army.
- No.528532 Warrant Officer, Class II (Regimental Quarter-Master-Sergeant) Harry Buck, The Yorkshire Hussars (Alexandra, Princess of Wales's Own), Territorial Army.
- No.5720606 Warrant Officer, Class II (Regimental Quarter-Master-Sergeant) Arthur Jenkins Burden, 4th Battalion, The Dorsetshire Regiment, Territorial Army.
- Lieutenant Henry Melville Cadman, Ceylon Planters Rifle Corps, Ceylon Defence Force.
- No.1850070 Warrant Officer, Class I (Regimental Sergeant-Major) Frederick George Corder, Royal Engineers.
- Lieutenant (Senior Assistant Surgeon) Eugene Avron Cotton, DCM, Indian Medical Department.
- No.2554561 Warrant Officer, Class II (Company Sergeant-Major) Frederick Oscar Creighton, 1st Anti-Aircraft Divisional Signals, Royal Corps of Signals, Territorial Army.
- Captain Thomas Holland Crowther, Glamorgan Heavy Regiment, Royal Artillery, Territorial Army.
- Major Frederick John Dean, TD, Devonshire and Cornwall Fortress Engineers, Royal Engineers, Territorial Army.
- Lieutenant-Colonel James Dean, DCM, 74th (Northumbrian) Field Regiment, Royal Artillery, Territorial Army (Captain, retired pay) (Regular Army Reserve of Officers).
- Captain Rohan Delacombe, 1st Battalion, The Royal Scots (The Royal Regiment).
- Major (Quarter-Master) Frederick James Diggins, MC, late 5th Battalion, The Leicestershire Regiment, Territorial Army (Captain, retired pay, late The Leicestershire Regiment).
- No.6392311 Warrant Officer, Class II (Company Sergeant-Major), Leonard Frederick Divall, 1st Battalion, The Royal Sussex Regiment.
- Captain (Quarter-Master), William Richard Drew, 47th (The Durham Light Infantry) Anti-Aircraft Battalion, Royal Engineers, Territorial Army.
- Captain Thomas Durrant, 57th (Wessex) Anti-Aircraft Regiment, Royal Artillery, Territorial Army.
- Quarter-Master and Honorary Major Claude Cadman Easterbrook, DSO MC, Australian Instructional Corps, Quarter Master, Royal Military College of Australia.
- No.29205 Warrant Officer, Class II (Company Sergeant-Major), Dudley Keith Edwards, The London Divisional Engineers, Royal Engineers, Territorial Army.
- No.2202222 Warrant Officer, Class II (Company Sergeant-Major), John William Ellis, 37th (Tyne) Anti-Aircraft Battalion (Tyne Electrical Engineers), Royal Engineers, Territorial Army.
- Major (Commissary) Horace Mays Fox, Indian Army Ordnance Corps.
- Major Ian George David Alastair Forbes, Ampleforth College Contingent, Junior Division, Officers Training Corps.
- No.7717068 Warrant Officer, Class I (Garrison Sergeant-Major), George Goodman, Military Provost Staff Corps, Garrison Sergeant Major, Aldershot Command.
- Major Ian Alexander Grant, 9th (Glasgow Highlanders) Battalion, The Highland Light Infantry (City of Glasgow Regiment), Territorial Army.
- Sub-Conductor Rowland Greenhead, Royal Indian Army Service Corps.
- Captain (Quarter-Master) Ernest Sydney Gregg, DCM, 4th Battalion, The King's Own Yorkshire Light Infantry, Territorial Army.
- No.T/17739 Warrant Officer, Class I (Mechanist Sergeant-Major) (Artificer), William Ernest Hawkins, Royal Army Service Corps.
- Subadar-Major Umar Hayat Khan, 24th Mountain Regiment, Royal Artillery.
- No.4965336 Warrant Officer, Class II (Company Sergeant-Major), Harry Heath, 1st Battalion, The Sherwood Foresters (Nottinghamshire and Derbyshire Regiment).
- No.4524860 Warrant Officer, Class I (Regimental Sergeant-Major), Joseph Hollingsworth, 2nd Battalion, The West Yorkshire Regiment (The Prince of Wales's Own).
- Lieutenant (Ordnance Executive Officer, 3rd Class), Alfred John Matthew Hunt, Royal Army Ordnance Corps.
- Captain (Quarter-Master) Thomas James, Extra Regimentally Employed List, Master-at-Arms, Army School of Physical Training, Aldershot.
- No.6697045 Warrant Officer, Class II (Regimental Quarter-Master-Sergeant), Albert Edward Keen, Queen Victoria's Rifles, The King's Royal Rifle Corps, Territorial Army.
- Captain (Assistant Paymaster) William Edward Charles Loftus, Royal Army Pay Corps.
- Captain (Ordnance Officer, 4th Class) Hugh Fraser MacKenzie, Royal Army Ordnance Corps.
- No.2604337 Warrant Officer, Class I (Regimental Sergeant-Major), William John Martin, 1st Battalion, The Royal Inniskilling Fusiliers.
- Major Bernard Stuart Mead, 48th (Hampshire) Anti-Aircraft Battalion, Royal Engineers, Territorial Army.
- Lieutenant Robert Keith Melluish, late Rossall School Contingent, Junior Division, Officers Training Corps.
- No.1667767 Warrant Officer, Class II (Battery Sergeant-Major), Robert Murphy, 55th (Kent) Anti-Aircraft Regiment, Royal Artillery, Territorial Army.
- Major Thomas Prain Douglas Murray, 4th/5th (Dundee and Angus) Battalion, The Black Watch (Royal Highland Regiment), Territorial Army.
- Risaldar-Major Manindra Nath, Royal Indian Army Service Corps.
- Major Thomas Nettleton, TD, 66th (Leeds Rifles, The West Yorkshire Regiment) Anti-Aircraft Regiment, Royal Artillery, Territorial Army.
- Captain David Nicol, New Zealand Army Ordnance Corps, District Ordnance Officer, Southern Military District, New Zealand Military Forces.
- Major (Quarter-Master) Ernest Alfred North, MC DCM, late 5th Battalion, The Lancashire Fusiliers, Territorial Army (Lieutenant, retired pay, late The Lancashire' Fusiliers).
- No.1414455 Warrant Officer, Class II (Battery Sergeant-Major) James William O'Neill, Royal Artillery.
- No.T/31514 Warrant Officer, Class II (Mechanist Quarter-Master-Sergeant) (local Warrant Officer, Class I) (Mechanist Sergeant Major), Herbert George Onyett, Royal Army Service Corps.
- No.5/6401 Warrant Officer, Class I (Staff Sergeant-Major), Walter Paul, Royal Army Service Corps.
- Captain Ronald Henry Pennefather, 2nd Battalion, Straits Settlements Volunteer Force, Singapore Volunteer Corps, Straits Settlements Volunteer Force.
- Lieutenant Cyril Edgar Burton Pugh,, Royal Engineers.
- No.6538547 Warrant Officer, Class II (Regimental Quarter-Master-Sergeant), William James Reason, 10th (3rd City of London) Battalion (69th Searchlight Regiment), The Royal Fusiliers (City of London Regiment), Territorial Army.
- Major (Quarter-Master) Thomas Graham Roberts, DCM, 43rd (5th Duke of Wellington's Regiment), Anti-Aircraft Battalion, Royal Engineers, Territorial Army.
- Major (Commissary) Bertram James Robertson, India Miscellaneous List, Deputy Assistant Director, Adjutant General's Branch, Headquarters of the Army in India.
- Captain Jose Simao Rodrigues, Portuguese Companies, Hong Kong Volunteer Defence Corps.
- Major Donald Ross, TD MB MRCP(Ed) JP, Royal Army Medical Corps, Territorial Army.
- Major Albert Thomas Sheldon, MM TD, late 45th (The Royal Warwickshire Regiment), Anti-Aircraft Battalion, Royal Engineers, Territorial Army.
- Captain (Quarter-Master) Edward Charles Shepperd, 6th (Bermondsey) Battalion, The Queen's Royal Regiment (West Surrey), Territorial Army.
- Lieutenant Alfred Charles Simonds, The Royal Berkshire Regiment (Princess Charlotte of Wales's).
- Lieutenant (Quarter-Master) George Henry Smith, 50th (Northumbrian) Divisional Signals, Royal Corps of Signals, Territorial Army.
- No.6791004 Warrant Officer, Class II (Regimental Quarter-Master-Sergeant), Harold Rees-Smith, MC, The Artists Rifles, The Rifle Brigade (Prince Consort's Own), Territorial Army.
- Captain (Quarter-Master) John Edwin Smith, 5th Battalion, The Royal Norfolk Regiment, Territorial Army.
- Second-Lieutenant (local Captain) William Robert George Smith, 8th (1st City of London) Battalion, The Royal Fusiliers (City of London Regiment), Territorial Army.
- Quarter-Master and Honorary Major Carl Rudolph Speckman, MC, Australian Instructional Corps, Deputy Assistant Director of Mechanization, Department of the Quarter Master-General and Master-General of the Ordnance, Army Headquarters, Australian Military Forces.
- Captain Walter Stewart, MB, Royal Army Medical Corps.
- No.5485475 Warrant Officer, Class II (Regimental Quarter-Master-Sergeant), Arthur Bertram Stone, 1st Battalion, The Hampshire Regiment.
- No.725964 Warrant Officer, Class II (Battery Sergeant-Major), Edward Ernest Taylor, 72nd (Hampshire) Anti-Aircraft Regiment, Royal Artillery, Territorial Army.
- No.2605329 Warrant Officer, Class I (Regimental Sergeant-Major), George Frederick Turner, DCM, 3rd Battalion, Grenadier Guards.
- No.6768260 Warrant Officer, Class II (Company Sergeant-Major), Sidney George West, 35th (First Surrey Rifles) Anti-Aircraft Battalion, Royal Engineers, Territorial Army.
- No.2554559 Warrant Officer, Class II (Company Sergeant-Major), Leslie Abner Whittingham, 1st Anti-Aircraft Divisional Signals, Royal Corps of Signals, Territorial Army.
- Captain (Inspector of Royal Engineer Machinery) Harold Ernest Williams, Royal Engineers.
- Regimental Quarter-Master-Sergeant Harold Wraight, The Malay Regiment.

Honorary Member

- Tewfic Ali Saleh, Kaid, Trans-Jordan Frontier Force.

Royal Air Force

- Flight Lieutenant John William Bayley.
- Flying Officer (now Acting Flight Lieutenant) Morris Michael Kane.
- Flying Officer William John Stephen Barnard.
- Warrant Officer Clement Edgar Reed.
- Warrant Officer William Sidney Arthur Stewart.
- Warrant Officer Harry Fletcher.
- Warrant Officer Stephen Edward Hearnden.
- Flight Lieutenant Arthur Raymond Styles, Royal Australian Air Force.

Civil Division

- Henry William Atterbury, Higher Clerical Officer, Colonial Office.
- Aubrey William Baker. For political and public services in Hertford.
- Robert Frederick Balls. For political and public services in Canterbury.
- Alfred Thomas Barber, Surveyor, Board of Customs and Excise.
- Alderman Ellen Elizabeth Bell, JP, Chairman of the Women's Sub-Committee of the Sunderland Local Employment Committee.
- Sydney Leighton Ponsonby Bewsher, Technical Adviser, Rural Industries Bureau.
- Muriel Bird. For political and public services in Chesterfield.
- Norman Black, FAI, Superintending Estate Surveyor, HM Office of Works and Public Buildings.
- Alderman William Micah Bolton, Chairman of the Willesden Local Employment Committee.
- Albert Briers, Chief Clerk, Telephone Manager's Office, Cardiff, General Post Office.
- Walter Clifford Burns, Motor Transport Officer, Class I, Engineering Department, General Post Office.
- Major Henry Cavendish Butler, District Commandant, Special Constabulary, Northern Ireland.
- Charles Edward Charlesworth. For political and public services in Barnsley.
- John Elsey Chatterton. For political and public services in Horncastle.
- Harold Sandford Clutterbuck, Manager, Technical Department, Society of Motor Manufacturers and Traders.
- Charles Cockram, Clerk and Steward, Rampton State Institution, Board of Control.
- Arthur Cecil Cooper, Higher Clerical Officer, Offices of the Cabinet, Committee of Imperial Defence, Economic Advisory Council and Minister for Co-ordination of Defence.
- Frederick James Cox, Assistant Librarian of the London Library.
- James Gumming, lately Chief Sanitary Inspector of the City of Aberdeen.
- James Edward Daly, Superintendent (Postal), London Postal Region, General Post Office.
- Marianne Bradley Dawson, Matron of Gateshead Children's Hospital.
- Thomas Herbert Dyer, JP. For political and public services in Cornwall.
- Henry Eastwood, Secretary of the London Orphan School and Royal British Orphan School at Watford.
- Charles Emerson, Higher Clerical Officer, Offices of the Cabinet, Committee of Imperial Defence, Economic Advisory Council and Minister for Co-ordination of Defence.
- David Thomas Evans, Superintendent and Deputy Chief Constable, Breconshire Constabulary.
- Arthur Owen Everard, Superintendent and Deputy Chief Constable, Birkenhead Borough Police Force.
- Jane Page Ferlie, Matron-in-charge of the Maternity Pavilion, Simpson Memorial Royal Infirmary, Edinburgh.
- William Maitland Findlay, Superintendent of Experiments and Lecturer in Seed Testing, North of Scotland College of Agriculture.
- Walter Thomas Flood, Chief Sanitary Inspector, Warrington County Borough.
- Major John Ernest Grosvenor, TD JP. For political and public services in Kidderminster.
- William Henry Grout, Assistant Head of Branch, Office of the Commissioners of Crown Lands.
- Frederick Haigh, Staff Officer, Board of Inland Revenue.
- Charles Thomas Chancellor Hall, MRST, Head Master of Cromwell Road Central Boys' School, Weymouth.
- Hilda Avison Hall. For political services.
- James William Harrison, lately Chief Clerk and Finance Officer, Ordnance Survey Department.
- The Reverend Alexander Harvey, Chairman of the Widnes Juvenile Advisory Committee.
- William Wilkins Hatton, First Class Officer, Ministry of Labour.
- James Hawitt, Head Postmaster, Darlington.
- William George Head, Staff Officer, Dominions Office.
- Olive Maud Heath, Chief Superintendent of Typists, HM Land Registry.
- Councillor Ida Hinchliffe, JP. For political and public services in Dewsbury.
- Mary Hobbs, Woman Inspector, Ministry of Health.
- Adolpha Wykeham Holt. For political and public services in Thirsk and Malton.
- Charles Louis John Holt. For political and public services in Preston.
- William Harrison Huddart, Head Master of Culgaith Church of England School, Cumberland.
- Edith Helen Iles. For political and public services in the Cannock Division of Staffordshire.
- Arthur Thomas Knight, Vice-Chairman of the Reading Local Employment Committee.
- Harriet Knight, Superintendent Health Visitor, Liverpool.
- Captain Henry Lambert, lately Command Land Agent, Aldershot Command, War Office.
- Ethel Alice Leighton, Accountant, Building Research Station, Department of Scientific and Industrial Research.
- Ruth Gordon McClure. For political and public services in the Altrincham Division of Cheshire.
- William McCulloch, Superintendent, Dumbartonshire Constabulary.
- Hugh George McDiarmid, Senior Executive Officer, Board of Customs and Excise.
- Annie Cameron Maclarty, JP, Infants' Mistress, Kilmarnock Academy.
- Catherine Marian McLauchlan. For political and public services in Fife.
- David Martin, Superintendent, Metropolitan Police.
- William Mathers, Deputy Principal, Ministry of Labour, Northern Ireland.
- Frederick May, Cartoonist. For services to the Territorial Army.
- Nora Moody, First Class Clerk, Companies (Winding-up) Department, Board of Trade.
- Councillor Charles George Moreland. For political and public services in Cardiff.
- Emily Mudge. For political and public services in Bow and Bromley.
- Arthur Frederick Orchard, Staff Officer, Foreign Office.
- Hubert Courtenay Orchard, Probation Officer, County Borough of Walsall.
- Charley Osborne, AMIEE, Electrical Engineer, Admiralty.
- Percy Henry Patmore, MM, Higher Grade Clerk, Ministry of Agriculture and Fisheries.
- Susanna Eleanora Sybilla Paton, Probation Officer, Isle of Man.
- Muriel Cassels Balfour Paul. For political and public services in Midlothian and Peebles.
- Daisy Ada Payne, Superintendent of Typists, War Office.
- Thomas Penman, Senior Meat Inspector, Finsbury Metropolitan Borough Council.
- William Penman, Assistant Commandant, City of London Special Constabulary.
- Ernest Walter Phillips, Senior Staff Officer, Clerk to the Traffic Commissioners, South-Eastern Traffic Area, Ministry of Transport.
- Henry Ray Powell, Chief Clerk, National Debt Office.
- Nelson Morris Price, Chairman of the North East Glamorgan War Pensions Committee.
- James Frederick Raine, Staff Officer, Board of Inland Revenue.
- Helene Eversley Randall, Chief Superintendent of Typists, Air Ministry.
- William John Rayner, lately HM Inspector of Schools.
- Hubert Richardson, Secretary of the Hertford County Playing Fields Association.
- Lily Amelia Rose, Chief Superintendent of Typists, Ministry of Transport.
- Alfred Henry Rosevear. For political and public services in South East St. Pancras.
- Arnold Louis Schuster, Actuary, Liverpool Trustee Savings Bank.
- Charlotte Maria Sharp, Head Mistress, George Salter Senior Girls' School, West Bromwich.
- Henry Erskine Sherrard, Deputy Principal, Ministry of Finance, Northern Ireland.
- Sidney William Sherrard, Staff Clerk, Unemployment Assistance Board.
- Henry Spencer, Chairman of Shipley and District Local Employment Committee.
- Alderman Percy John Charles Staniland, JP. For public services in Newark-on-Trent.
- Kate Louisa Steel, lately Superintendent of Ardwick Nursery School, Manchester.
- Ephraim Street, Chief Supervisor, Employers' Clearing House, Cardiff.
- Alfred Henry James Stroud. For political and public services in Aldershot.
- William Rees Thomas. For political and public services in Aberavon.
- Margaret Christina Thomson, Principal Clerk, Savings Bank Department, General Post Office.
- Henry Matcham Thornton. For political services in Kingston upon Thames.
- Wilfrid Thorpe, Chairman, Denton National Savings Committee.
- Eric Wilfred Robert Traviss, Senior Staff Officer, Air Ministry.
- Flora Charlotte Tristram. For political and public services in Hastings.
- Charles Victor Howard Vincent. For political and public services in Jarrow.
- Charles Wade, First Class Officer, Ministry of Labour, Manager, Employment Exchange, Sheffield.
- Frederick Charles Walton. For political services in the Rugby Division of Warwickshire.
- William Grant Watling, Maintenance Surveyor, HM Office of Works and Public Buildings.
- William Donald Watson, Staff Officer, Department of Agriculture for Scotland.
- William Baynes Whitton, Superintendent Relieving Officer, Birmingham.
- John Crossland Wildman, Headmaster, HM Dockyard School, Portsmouth.
- Dorothy Veronica Wilford, Administrative Assistant, War Office.
- Margaret Annie Helena Wright. For political and public services in Middlesbrough.
- Douglas Allen, a British subject resident in Alexandria.
- Elsie Gladys Baker, until recently a Clerical Officer at His Majesty's Embassy at Washington.
- Lieutenant-Commander Alexander Putnam Gumming, DSC, Royal Navy, British Vice-Consul in Northern Norway.
- Charles Robert Neville Emary, until recently Wireless Operator at His Majesty's Consulate at Valencia.
- Arnold Thomas Harry Evans, British Vice-Consul at Stettin.
- Theodore Henry Froebelius, Archivist at His Majesty's Legation at Riga.
- Delia Maud Harding, Secretary to His Majesty's Consulate at Pará, Brazil.
- Malcolm Hamish Lees, District Engineer, Public Works Department, Sudan Government.
- Harold Levison, British Vice-Consul at Padang, Sumatra.
- Mabel Norton Milanes, a British subject resident in Madrid, Wife of the British Vice Consul.
- Cuthbert Hamilton Ringwood Peach, Headmaster of the High School for Boys at Istanbul.
- John Walker, Commercial Secretary at His Majesty's Embassy at Bagdad.
- Jane Alexander. For social welfare services in the Commonwealth of Australia.
- Helen Louise Brougham. For services in connection with philanthropic movements in the Commonwealth of Australia.
- Kathleen Browne, Honorary Secretary, Empire Day Movement.
- Teresa Butler, Matron of the hospital at Rarotonga, Cook Islands, Dominion of New Zealand.
- Blanche Eleanor Carnachan, JP. For social welfare services in the Dominion of New Zealand.
- Lucy Compson Daw, Matron of the Adelaide General Hospital, State of South Australia.
- Frances Esme Desailly. For charitable services in the Commonwealth of Australia.
- Alan Parkhurst Dodd, Chief Entomologist to the Prickly Pear Board, Commonwealth of Australia.
- Sidney Edward Dunslow, JP. For services to ex-servicemen in the Commonwealth of Australia.
- Albury Rowlands Grove Fearby. For services to ex-servicemen in the Commonwealth of Australia.
- Isabel Margaret Fidler. For services to education in the State of New South Wales.
- Annie Forsyth. For services in connection with charitable and philanthropic movements, State of New South Wales.
- Captain Gabriel Silas Fudge, Captain of SS Malakoff, Newfoundland. For public services.
- Elizabeth St Vincent Heyes. For charitable services in the Maitland District, State of New South Wales.
- Henry Herbert Hitchcock, Secretary of the Beit Railway Trust. For services to Southern Rhodesia.
- David Hunter. For municipal services in Waverley, State of New South Wales.
- Harry Brisbane Jamieson. For public and philanthropic services in the Commonwealth of Australia.
- Peter Arnold Johnston, Stock Inspector, Veterinary Department, Bechuanaland Protectorate.
- Mary Blythe Law, formerly a teacher at the Institute for the Blind, Auckland, Dominion of New Zealand.
- James Lawrence, Assistant Superintendent of Telegraphs at Melbourne, Postmaster-General's Department, Commonwealth of Australia.
- Oswald Thomas Russell Leishman, Resident Engineer in the construction of the Otto Beit Bridge, Chirandu, Southern Rhodesia.
- John Gusth Nelsson, senior non-official member of the Legislative Council of Papua, Commonwealth of Australia.
- William Hamlet Nicol, Secretary, Australian Workers' Union (Tasmanian Branch).
- Thelma Agatha O'Dowd, Senior Clerk to the Auditor, Office of the High Commissioner for Basutoland, the Bechuanaland Protectorate and Swaziland.
- Frank Reed, formerly Chief Inspector of Mines, Mines Department, Dominion of New Zealand.
- Diana Schultz, of Enkeldoorn, Southern Rhodesia. For social welfare services.
- Jean Smith. For services to ex-servicemen and their dependents in the Commonwealth of Australia.
- Honorary Colonel Frederick William Toll, DSO VD. For services to ex-service men and their dependents in the Commonwealth of Australia.
- George Warren, Chairman, Barossa and Mount Crawford District Councils, State of South Australia.
- Amy Wheaton, Honorary Director of the South Australian Board of Social Study and Training. For public services in the Commonwealth of Australia.
- Thomas Henry White. For services to blinded ex-servicemen in the Commonwealth of Australia.
- Edith Mary Woodhouse. For social welfare services in the State of New South Wales.
- Una Frances Marie Morton, MD BS MRCS LRCP, Women's Medical Service, Principal, Women's Medical School, Agra, United Provinces.
- Pir Akbar Ali, Member of the Punjab Legislative Assembly, and Advocate, Ferozepore City, Punjab.
- Neville Charles Alley, Assistant Director of Survey and Land Records, Office of the Board of Revenue Madras.
- Rai Bahadur Rabindra Nath Banerji, MB BS, Medical Practitioner, Allahabad, United Provinces.
- Bahadur Satish Chandra Biswas, Assistant Secretary in the political Department.
- Frank William Boorer, Chief Inspector, Preventive Service, Karachi Custom House, Sind.
- William Oscar Browne, District Transportation Superintendent, Madras and Southern Mahratta Railway Co.
- Captain William Crick, Honorary Secretary, Ex-services Association, Bangalore.
- Antony Furtado, Rummaging Inspector, Preventive Service, Calcutta Custom House, Bengal.
- Albert Joseph Suttbn Gabriel, Superintendent of Telegraphs (Ret'd).
- Octavius Gomes, District Traffic Superintendent, Rates, Bombay, Baroda and Central India Railway.
- Alan Leslie Greenway, Indian Medical Department, Medical Officer and Quarantine Medical Officer, Kuwait, Persian Gulf Residency.
- Sardar Mulsinhji Jibava, Thakor of Kuna, Kaira District, Bombay.
- Thomas Edward Jones, Technical Supervisor, Security Printing, India.
- Charles Murray Ker, Indian Civil Service, Under-Secretary to the Government of India in the Department of Labour.
- Andrew Francis MacCulloch, FIC AMIChemE, Advisory Chemist, Medical Store Depot, Madras.
- Lt. Colonel Sardar Naunihal Singh Mann of Mughalchak and Mananwala, Hony. Magistrate, I Class, Rais-i-Azam, Member of the Legislative Assembly (Punjab), Landowner, Mananwala, Sheikhupura District, Punjab.
- Agam Prashad Mathur, Private Secretary to the Auditor-General of India.
- Charles Melmoth Bailey Mersh, Electrical Adviser to the Government of the Central Provinces and Berar.
- Tolaram Khanch and Mirchandani, AMIE, Officiating Deputy Conservator of Forests, Bombay.
- Kasi Sankar Mitra, ASAA (Lond.), Secretary, Medical College Hospitals, Calcutta, Bengal.
- Frank Morgan, Honorary Deputy Superintendent of Police and Principal, Constables Training School, Angul, Cuttack District, Orissa.
- Chaudri Naseer Ahmed (Provincial Civil Service, Punjab), Private Secretary to the Law Member of the Governor-General's Executive Council.
- Nawabzada Nasrullah Khan, of Dera Ismail Khan, North-West Frontier Province.
- James David Paterson, Manager, Gouripore Jute Mill, Naihati, Bengal.
- Robert Arthur Pereira, District Board Engineer (Ret'd), Madras.
- Kottakal Raman Narayan Pillai, Extra Assistant Conservator of Forests, Divisional Forest Officer, Jubbulpore, Central Provinces and Berar.
- Radha Krishna, MB BS DPH, Medical Superintendent, Silver Jubilee Tuberculosis Hospital, and Tuberculosis Clinic, Delhi.
- James Robertson, lately Chairman, Bansbaria Municipality, Bengal.
- Herbert Aloysius Rodrigues, Deputy Assistant Controller, Military Accounts Department.
- Victor Gerald Rose, Chief Superintendent, Royal Indian Navy Office.
- Khan Bahadur Saiyid Moshfique Saleheen, Honorary Magistrate of Barrackpore and Titaghur, Bengal.
- Mohan Lai Sawhney, Barrister-at-Law, Sargodha, Punjab.
- Khan Bahadur Zahir Gul Khan, Deputy Superintendent of Police, North-West Frontier Province.
- Annie Baines, Matron, General Hospital, Bahamas.
- Rowland William Cunningham Baker-Beall, Colonial Administrative Service, District Officer, Kenya.
- Ethel Mary Brewer. For social and educational services in the Uganda Protectorate.
- John William Brown, Maintenance Engineer, Public Works Department, Palestine.
- Bradley Martin Cameron, Manager, Government Stock Farm and Agricultural Station, Acre, Palestine.
- Jamshed Firoz Dastur, Deputy Registrar, High Court, Zanzibar.
- Tudor Thomas Davies, Government Printer, Nyasaland Protectorate.
- William Moir Mathews Duncan, Colonial Administrative Service, Assistant District Officer, Tanganyika Territory.
- Edward Fernandez, Currency Officer, Singapore, Straits Settlements.
- Edward John Gibbons, Colonial Administrative Service, Assistant District Officer, Nigeria.
- Richard John Clyde Howes, Colonial Administrative Service, District Officer, Kenya.
- Demetrios Kakathimis. For services to education in Cyprus.
- Alice Elisabeth Kotalawala. For social services in Ceylon.
- Henride Cailade Lotbiniere. For public services in Seychelles.
- Andrew Alexander McKinnon, Assistant Treasurer, Somaliland Protectorate.
- Muljibhai Prabhudas Madvhani. For social services in the Uganda Protectorate.
- Jessie Innes Masson. For public and social services in Trinidad.
- Mary Victoria Menzies For medical services in the Tanganyika Territory.
- Walter John Palmer For social services in Jamaica.
- Stanislaus Florence Theophilo Saldanha, Superintendent, Secretariat, Aden.
- Ramanathar Sivagnanam. For public services in Ceylon.
- Henry Griffin Smith, Statistician, Agricultural Department, Uganda Protectorate.
- Victor Adolphus Tettey, Colonial Education Service, Senior Inspector of Schools, Gold Coast.
- Ong Kim Tiang, lately Office Assistant, Colonial Secretary's Office, Straits Settlements.
- Ramaligam Naranapillai Thamby-Thurai, lately Secretary, Sanitary Board, Kuala Lumpur, Federated Malay States.

Honorary Members

- Afif Effendi At'Ut, District Inspector of Education, Palestine.
- Jacob Rachwalsky, Inspector, Engineering Branch, Department of Posts and Telegraphs, Palestine.

=== Order of the Companions of Honour (CH) ===
- George Peabody Gooch, FBA. For services to historical research.
- James Joseph Mallon, JP, Warden of Toynbee Hall.

=== Companion of the Imperial Service Order (ISO) ===
Home Civil Service

- Joseph John Allen, Principal, Mines Department.
- Julius Bradley, Architect, HM Office of Works and Public Buildings.
- John Burgoine, Assistant Principal Clerk, Board of Inland Revenue.
- Fred Chadwick, Finance Officer, Forestry Commission.
- Stanley Crowther, Senior Executive Officer, Air Ministry.
- Walter Dack, Chief Accountant, Supreme Court Pay Office.
- Arthur Cadmari Evans, Chief Clerk, Factory Department, Home Office.
- Robert Fanshawe, Controller, Stores Department, General Post Office.
- Charles Edward Hain, Finance Officer, Board of Education.
- John Renwick Hoatson, Accountant, British Museum.
- Joseph John Holloway, Principal Officer, Department of Overseas Trade.
- John Hunter, lately Librarian, Dominions Office and Colonial Office.
- William Keir, MBE, lately Chief Inspector of Sea Fisheries, Fishery Board for Scotland.
- William John McCaghey, MBE, Principal, Ministry of Labour, Northern Ireland.
- John Shankland McIntyre, Head of Division, Paymaster General's Office.
- William Perks, Inspector, 1st Class, Board of Customs and Excise.
- Robert Ross, MBE, Assistant Secretary to the Livestock Commission.
- Jabez Tennyson Turner, FSI, Chief Surveyor, Civil Engineer-in-Chief's Department, Admiralty.
- Walter Weighell, MBE, Assistant, Consular Department, Foreign Office.

Dominions

- Victor Edward Butler, Acting Deputy Director in New South Wales, Postmaster General's Department, Commonwealth of Australia.
- George Ernest Willson, Commonwealth public Service Inspector, Adelaide, State of South Australia.

Indian Civil Services

- Samuel Valentine Bobb, Stenographer to the Governor of the United Provinces.
- Thomas Alfred Coates, Assistant Secretary to the Resident, and Treasury Officer, Hyderabad.
- Joseph Bonfilio Fernandez, Secretary, Bombay-Sind public Service Commission, Bombay.
- Diwan Ganesh Dass, Registrar, Public Works Department Secretariat, North-West Frontier Province.
- Henry Gordon Maclean, Bombay Excise Service, Superintendent of Excise, Ahmedabad Division, Bombay.

Burma

- U Thin, Registrar, Defence Department, Government of Burma.
- Manickam Dharma Raj, Assistant Labour Commissioner, Burma.

Colonies, Protectorates, etc.

- John Moubray Dunbar, Assistant and Office Superintendent, Department of Agriculture, Gold Coast.
- Reginald Elliott, Land Assistant, Kenya.
- Charles Vincent Gooneratne, Assistant Superintendent of Police, Ceylon.
- Joachim Joseph Jacob, Deputy Auditor General, Ceylon.
- Samuel Theophilus Johnson, African Assistant Keeper and Storekeeper, Prisons Department, Sierra Leone.
- Lieutenant-Colonel Albert Edward Micallef, Manager, Water and Electricity Department, Malta.
- John Milne, Colonial Customs Service, Senior Collector of Customs, Gold Coast.
- Aime Augustus Ragg, Assistant Director of Public Works, Fiji.
- Amnachalam Visvanadhan, Extra Office Assistant, Ceylon Civil Service.

=== Imperial Service Medal ===
Indian Civil services.

- Ongli Ngaku Chang, Head Dobashi, Mokokchung, Naga Hills, Assam.
- Maulvi Abdul Ghanny, Sub-Inspector, Telegraphs, Chittagong, Bengal.
- Alif Gul Band Khel Mahsud, Jemadar-Orderly to the Resident in Waziristan, North-West Frontier Province.
- Amiralli Sayad Hussein, Excise Jemadar, Bhusawal Railway Station, Bombay.
- Wandiwash Chinniah Nayudu, Line-Inspector, Telegraphs, Madura Engineering Sub Division, Madras.
- Abdur Rahman, Duffadar, Collector's Office, Vizagapatam, Madras.
- Duloo Ram, Jemadar Chaprassi, Lower Chenab East Circle, Lyallpur, Punjab.
- Randhir Singh, Head Jemadar-Orderly, Government House, United Provinces.

=== British Empire Medal (BEM) ===
==== For Gallantry ====
Military Division

- Frederick Christie Anderson, Chief Engine Room Artificer First Class, ON P/M28823.

==== For Meritorious Service ====
Military Division

Royal Navy

- Daniel Archibald Lee, Petty Officer Telegraphist, ON P/J97353.
- Arthur Ernest Ebsworth, Quartermaster Sergeant Instructor, ON Po/21920.

Army

- No.4960071 Company Quarter-Master-Sergeant Charles Frederick Cooper, 40th (The Sherwood Foresters) Anti-Aircraft Battalion, Royal Engineers, Territorial Army.
- No.6538061 Sergeant George Herbert Cotton, 10th (3rd City of London) Battalion (69th Searchlight Regiment), The Royal Fusiliers (City of London Regiment), Territorial Army.
- No.721119 Battery Quarter-Master-Sergeant Ralph Hall Jackson, MM, 74th (Northumbrian) Field Regiment, Royal Artillery, Territorial Army.
- No.T/6076093 Sergeant William Edward Lander, Royal Army Service Corps.
- No.5883680 Private (Acting Lance-Corporal) Gordon Lea, Royal Army Ordnance Corps.
- No.2974 Naik Mohamed Khan, 6th (Singapore) Anti-Aircraft Battery, Hong Kong Singapore Royal Artillery.
- No.1414314 Staff-Sergeant (Artillery Clerk) Albert Henry Nankivell, Royal Artillery.
- No.860319 Battery Quarter-Master-Sergeant Alfred Price, 94th (Queen's Own Dorset Yeomanry) Field Regiment, Royal Artillery, Territorial Army.
- No.2647544 Sergeant Christopher Robinson, Regimental Staff, Coldstream Guards.
- No.1412242 Staff-Sergeant (Artillery Clerk) William Edwin Skelton, Royal Artillery.
- No.761173 Sergeant-Clerk Ernest John Tompsett, 97th (Kent Yeomanry) Army Field Regiment, Royal Artillery, Territorial Army.
- No.3589460 Colour-Sergeant James Milburn Wood, DCM, 4th/5th Battalion (Queen's Edinburgh) (52nd Searchlight Regiment) The Royal Scots (The Royal Regiment), Territorial Army.

Royal Air Force

- 362958 Flight Sergeant Ronald Henry Abrook.
- 354836 Flight Sergeant Sidney Donald Daymond.
- 562270 Flight Sergeant John Simpson Robinson.
- 370981 Flight Sergeant Matthew Roe.
- 343342 Flight Sergeant Tom Gilbert Samuels.
- 356614 Flight Sergeant George Henry Wiles.
- 347405 Sergeant (now Flight Sergeant) Joseph Ronald Jackson.
- 363042 Sergeant Stanley Charles White.
- 590224 Acting Sergeant Robert James Barclay.
- 353745 Acting Sergeant Edwin John Field.

Civil Division

- John Barnard Acres, Civilian Instructor, Grade I, Oxford University Air Squadron.
- Alice Allsopp Baldwin, Telephonist, Cabinet Office Exchange, London Telecommunications Region, General Post Office.
- Albert Philip Barker, Engineering Skilled Workman, Class I, Head Post Office, Uxbridge, employed at No.11 Fighter Group Headquarters, Royal Air Force.
- Ethel Aitken Epps, Telephone Supervisor, Inland Trunk Exchange, London Telecommunications Region, General Post Office.
- Ruby Mabel Lewis, Superintendent Storewoman, Post Office Stores Department.
- Edward Arthur Parish, JP, Assistant Inspector, Braintree Head Post Office, Essex.
- William Henry Rigglesford, Foreman Photoprinter, Stores Department, General Post Office.
- John Andrew Rutherford, Chief Officer, Class I, HM Prison Manchester.
- Albert Edward Twycross, Chief Inspector, Post Office Engineering Department, Nottingham.
- Henry William Oscar Weeks, Sub-Postmaster, West Street Town Sub-Office, Ryde, Isle of Wight.
- Thomas Wilkinson, Rural Postman, Ravenstonedale Sub-Post Office, Penrith, Cumberland.
- Daoud Adam, Bandmaster, Railway Police Force Band, Sudan.
- Lutfi Saleh Daoud, Clerk, Railways Department, Sudan.
- Senora Dolores Murcia, Servant at HM Embassy, Madrid.
- Oliver Vincent Ballard, Senior Overseer, Mail Branch, Postmaster General's Department, Sydney, New South Wales.
- Christopher Nesbitt, Acting Line Foreman, Grade I, Postmaster General's Department, Northern Territory, South Australia.
- Francis Thomas Walsh, Storeholder, Grade 2, Ordnance Branch, Defence Department, Maribyrnong, Victoria.
- Sankalamba Ao, Dobashi (Interpreter), Mokokchung, Naga Hills, Assam.
- Bhupati Mohan Basu, Sheristadar, District and Sessions Judge's Office, Birbhum, Bengal.
- Imlong Chang, Merchant, Mokokchung, Naga Hills, Assam.
- Maulvi Abdullah Jan, Head Clerk, North Waziristan Agency, Miranshah, North-West Frontier Province.
- Sydney Henry Kennedy, Inspector of Works, East Indian Railway Company, Howrah.
- Frederick George Marshall, Foreman, Rifle Factory Ishapore, Calcutta.
- Joseph Francis Albina, Army Interpreter, attached to Headquarters, 14th Infantry Brigade, Palestine.
- Maroun Badran Chkaiban, Quarry Foreman, Palestine Railways.
- Salem Deeb, Foreman, Public Works Department, Palestine.
- Ibrahim Fadlalla, Chief Immigration Guard, Department of Immigration, Palestine.
- Olga Hananiya, Clerical Officer, Department of Migration and Statistics, Palestine.
- Francis Huang, Chinese Translator, Police Department, Federated Malay States.
- Michael Khalil, Chief Test Clerk, Department of Posts and Telegraphs, Palestine.
- Tanjore Visvanath Santhuram Rao, lately Special Class Clerk, Federated Malay States Railways.
- Mohanni Sharaby, Station Master, Lydda, Palestine.
- Moses Weiss, Skilled Workman, Class I, Department of Posts and Telegraphs, Palestine.

=== Royal Red Cross (RRC) ===
- Matron Gladys Taylor, Princess Mary's Royal Air Force Nursing Service.

==== Associate of the Royal Red Cross (ARRC) ====
- Matron Matilda Goodrich, Queen Alexandra's Royal Naval Nursing Service.
- Senior Sister Maud Harriette Adamson, Princess Mary's Royal Air Force Nursing Service.

=== Air Force Cross (AFC) ===
Royal Air Force

- Wing Commander Leon Martin.
- Squadron Leader Dermot Alexander Boyle.
- Squadron Leader Henry Iliffe Cozens.
- Squadron Leader Louis Walter Dickens.
- Squadron Leader Andrew McKee.
- Squadron Leader Herbert John Pringle.
- Squadron Leader Gerald Barnard Keily.
- Flight Lieutenant (now Squadron Leader) Harold Gibson Lee.
- Flight Lieutenant John William McGuire.
- Flight Lieutenant Richard Melville Coad.
- Flying Officer Deryck Cameron Stapleton.

Reserve of Air Force Officers.

- Flight Lieutenant Norman Hargreave Woodhead, DSC.

Royal Australian Air Force

- Flight Lieutenant (now Squadron Leader) Anthony George Carr.

=== Kaisar-i-Hind Medal ===
First Class

- Doreen Maud, Marchioness of Linlithgow, CI.
- Marjorie, Lady Erskine (Wife of the Lord Erskine, GCIE, Governor of Madras), Madras.
- Bridget Alington, Lady Hubback (Wife of Sir John Hubback, KCSI, Governor of Orissa), Orissa.
- Ganga Swarup Shrimati Rupkunwarba Sahiba, step-mother of the Raja of Bansda.
- Joyce Edwina Turville Collins (Wife of G. F. S. Collins, CIE OBE ICS, Revenue Commissioner), Sind.
- Mary Firth Guyton, lately of Farrer Zenana Mission Hospital, Bhiwani, Hissar District, Punjab.
- Swarnaprava Mullick (Widow of the late S. N. Mullick, CIE, Member of Council of the Secretary of State for India), Bengal.
- Grace Stapleton, MD BS(London) FCOG(Eng.), Women's Medical Service, Professor of Obstetrics and Gynaecology, Lady Hardinge Medical College, New Delhi.
- The Reverend Harold Bridges, Baptist Mission, Patna, Bihar.
- The Reverend Victor James White, Australian Baptist Mission, Birisiri, Bengal.

==== Bar to the Kaisar-i-Hind Medal ====
First Class

- Blanche Margaret Tweddle, in charge of Methodist Mission Village Industry, Ikkadu, Chingleput District, Madras.

=== Air Force Medal (AFM) ===
Royal Air Force.

- 364506 Flight Sergeant Albert Stanley Blake.
- 560136 Flight Sergeant William Alfred Gray.
- 362749 Flight Sergeant Robert William Jarred.
- 363448 Flight Sergeant Alfred Charles Leonard Munns.
- 365094 Flight Sergeant (now Warrant Officer) Charles George Wareham.
- 563019 Sergeant Archie Edward Ballam.
- 506231 Sergeant Alec West.
- 506660 Acting Sergeant Philip Roy Wiltshire.
- 515441 Corporal George Henry Jacobsen.
- 366235 Corporal Richard Edward Wesson.
- 522098 Leading Aircraftman Dominic Bruce.

=== King's Police Medal ===
Police, England and Wales.

- Robert Howard, Chief Superintendent and Deputy Chief Constable, Salford City Police Force.
- William Malcolm Page, Detective Superintendent, Manchester City Police Force.

Fire Brigade, England and Wales.

- Charles James Wright, Senior Superintendent, London Fire Brigade.

=== Colonial Police Medal ===
- Major Wilfrid Carne Adams, MC, Commandant, North Borneo Constabulary.
- John Herman Bernard Amavih, Inspector of Police, Gold Coast.
- Jack Haliburton Ashmore, Deputy Commissioner of Police, Cyprus.
- Ishak Rashid Assali, Inspector of Police, Palestine.
- Musa Awaleh, Inspector of Police, Somaliland Protectorate.
- Captain Richard Waverley Head Ballantyne, Assistant Commissioner of Police, Nigeria.
- Leonard Belfron, Sergeant of Police, Trinidad.
- Arthur Collinge, Sergeant of Police, Palestine.
- Evans Cox, Sergeant-Major, Fire Brigade, Trinidad.
- Captain Robert John Craig, MC, Senior Assistant Superintendent of Police, Sierra Leone.
- Charles Dyas, Chief Inspector of Police, Straits Settlements.
- William Elson, Sergeant of Police, Palestine.
- Arthur Johnston, Sergeant-Major of Police, Trinidad.
- Michael Christofi Kareklas, MBE, Superintendent of Police, Cyprus.
- Kereiya s/o Loomer, Sergeant of (Police, Tanganyika Territory.
- George Graham Kermode, Superintendent of Police, Fiji.
- James Romain Kilgour, Sergeant-Major of Police, Trinidad.
- Leonard Faulconer Knight, Assistant Superintendent of Police, Straits Settlements.
- Francis Edward Little, Superintendent of Police, Tanganyika Territory.
- Ivo Enrico Lucchinelli, Superintendent of Police, Fiji.
- John Strang McBeath, Superintendent of Police, Bermuda.
- John Francis McAuliffe, Inspector of Police, Palestine.
- John James Panther, Inspector of Police, Palestine.
- Robert James Paul, Deputy Commissioner of Police, Nyasaland Protectorate.
- Habaragamuwage Thomas Peiris, Sergeant of Police, Ceylon.
- Solomon Rozenstein, Inspector of Police, Palestine.
- Cleophas Sandy, Sergeant-Major of Police, Trinidad.
- Henry Bennett Shaw, Assistant Superintendent of Police, Palestine.
- Piara Singh, Sub-Inspector of Police, Tanganyika Territory.
- George Robert Pretoria Tatum, Inspector of Police, Palestine.
- Reginald Tottenham, Senior Assistant Superintendent of Police, Gold Coast.
- John Alex Willis, Inspector of Police, Palestine.
- Fitzherbert Woods, Sergeant-Major of Police, Trinidad.
- Robert Lewkenor Worsley, Assistant Superintendent of Police, Palestine.
