= General Hawes =

General Hawes may refer to:

- Charles George Hawes (1890–1963), British Army brigadier general
- James Morrison Hawes (1824–1889), Confederate States Army brigadier general
- Leonard Arthur Hawes (1892−1986), British Army major general
