= Black's Guides =

Travel guide books

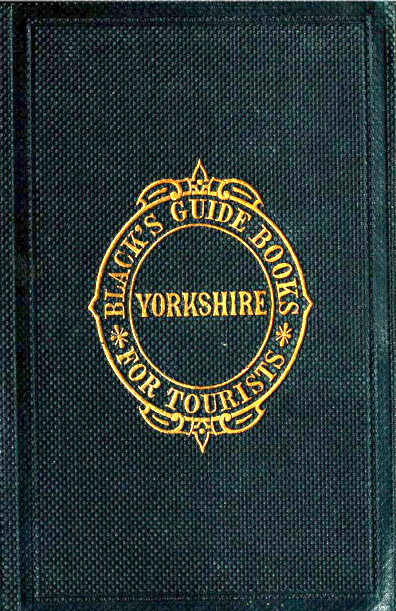
Black's Guide to Yorkshire, 1862

Black's Guides were travel guide books published by the Adam and Charles Black firm of Edinburgh (later London) beginning in 1839. The series' style tended towards the "colloquial, with fewer cultural pretensions" than its leading competitor Baedeker Guides. Contributors included David T. Ansted, Charles Bertram Black, and A.R. Hope Moncrieff.

== List of Black's Guides by geographic coverage ==
=== Egypt ===
- Eustace A. Reynolds-Ball (1907), Cairo of To-Day (5th ed.), London: Adam & Charles Black, OL 6478652M

=== France ===
- C.B. Black (1885), The South of France: East Half (4th ed.), Edinburgh: Adam and Charles Black
- C. B. Black (1887), The Riviera; or, the Coast from Marseilles to Leghorn (3rd ed.), Edinburgh: Adam & Charles Black
  - C. B. Black (1896), The Riviera; or, the Coast from Marseilles to Leghorn (9th ed.), London: Adam & Charles Black
- C.B. Black (1888). Itinerary through Corsica by its Rail, Carriage, and Forest Roads. Edinburgh: Adam and Charles Black.

=== Great Britain ===
==== 1830s-1850s ====
- Black's Economical Tourist of Scotland, Edinburgh: Adam and Charles Black, 1839
- Black's Economical Guide Through Glasgow (2nd ed.), Edinburgh: Adam and Charles Black, 1843
- Black's Picturesque Tourist and Road and Railway Guide Book through England and Wales (2nd ed.), Edinburgh: Adam and Charles Black, 1851
- Black's Picturesque Tourist of Scotland (9th ed.), Edinburgh: Adam and Charles Black, 1852, OL 23281882M
- Llewellynn Jewitt, ed. (1857). Black's Tourist's Guide to Derbyshire (2nd ed.). Edinburgh: Adam and Charles Black. + index

==== 1860s-1870s ====
- Black's Guide to the South-Eastern Counties of England, Edinburgh: Adam and Charles Black, 1861
- Black's Picturesque Guide to Yorkshire (2nd ed.), Edinburgh: Adam and Charles Black, 1862, OL 25125836M
- London and its Environs, Edinburgh: A. & C. Black, 1862, OCLC 1995082, OL 23316055M
  - Black's Guide to London and its Environs, Edinburgh: Adam & Charles Black, 1863
- Where Shall We Go? A Guide to the Healthiest and Most Beautiful Watering Places in the British Islands (4th ed.). Edinburgh: A. and C. Black. 1866.
- David Thomas Ansted, ed. (1870), Black's Guide to Jersey, Edinburgh: Adam and Charles Black
- Black's Guide to Liverpool, Edinburgh: Adam and Charles Black, 1871
- Black's Guide to Dorsetshire (6th ed.), Edinburgh: Adam and Charles Black, 1872
- Black's Guide to England and Wales (10th ed.), Edinburgh: A. and C. Black, 1872, OCLC 2207555, OL 6929136M. Index
- Black's Guide to Hampshire, Edinburgh: Adam and Charles Black, 1872
- Black's Guide to Warwickshire (3rd ed.), Edinburgh: Adam and Charles Black, 1874 + Index
- A.E. Lawson Lowe, ed. (1876), Black's Guide to Nottinghamshire, Edinburgh: Adam and Charles Black
- David Thomas Ansted, ed. (1879), Black's Guide to the Channel Islands (8th ed.), Edinburgh: Adam and Charles Black
- Black's Guide to Kent (8th ed.), Edinburgh: Adam and Charles Black, 1879

==== 1880s-1890s ====
- Black's Guide to Leamington (5th ed.), Edinburgh: Adam and Charles Black, 1880
  - Black's Guide to Leamington (6th ed.), Edinburgh: Adam and Charles Black, 1883
- Black's Tourists Guide to Scotland (4th ed.), Edinburgh: Adam and Charles Black, 1881
- C.B. Black (1883). Car Guide to Jersey and Guernsey. Edinburgh: A. and C. Black.
- Black's Guide to the Counties of Leicester & Rutland, Edinburgh: Adam and Charles Black, 1884 + Index
- Black's Guide to Harrogate. 1885.
- A. R. Hope Moncrieff, ed. (1895), Black's Guide to the Isle of Wight (13th ed.), London: Adam and Charles Black
- Black's Guide to North Wales (21st ed.), London: Adam and Charles Black, 1897
- A. R. Hope Moncrieff, ed. (1898), Black's Guide to Buxton and the Peak Country of Derbyshire (9th ed.), London: Adam and Charles Black, archived from the original on 2013-09-21 +
- A.R. Hope Moncrieff, ed. (1898), Black's Guide to Sussex and Its Watering-places (11th ed.), London: Adam and Charles Black

==== 1900s-1910s ====
- M. J. B. Baddeley, ed. (1900), Black's Shilling Guide to the English Lakes (22nd ed.), London: Adam and Charles Black
- A. R. Hope Moncrieff (1902), Black's Guide to Devonshire (17th ed.), London: A. & C. Black, OL 13996679M
- A. R. Hope Moncrieff, ed. (1902), Black's Guide to Exeter and East Devon, London: A. & C. Black
- A. R. Hope Moncrieff, ed. (1903), Black's Guide to the Trossachs, Loch Katrine, Loch Lomond, Etc. (26th ed.), London: Adam and Charles Black
- Black's Guide to Edinburgh (28th ed.), London: Adam and Charles Black, 1910, OCLC 222486033, OL 24871372M
- G.E. Mitton, ed. (1915), Black's Guide to Glasgow and the Clyde, London: A. & C. Black
- A. R. Hope Moncrieff, ed. (1919), Black's Guide to Cornwall (22nd ed.), London: A. & C. Black, OCLC 43328746, OL 24931771M
- L. E. Walter, ed. (1919), Black's Guide to Isle of Man, London: A. & C. Black

=== Ireland ===
- E. D. Jordan (1906), Black's Guide to Ireland (24th ed.), London: Adam and Charles Black

=== Italy ===
- Black's Guide to Italy, Edinburgh: Adam and Charles Black, 1869

=== Netherlands ===
- C.B. Black (1908). Holland: its Rail, Tram, and Waterways (3rd ed.). London: Adam and Charles Black.

=== Norway ===
- John Bowden, ed. (1867). Black's Guide to Norway. Edinburgh: Adam and Charles Black.

=== Palestine ===
- Eustace A. Reynolds-Ball (1912), Jerusalem: A Practical Guide to Jerusalem and Its Environs (2nd ed.), London: Adam and Charles Black

=== Switzerland ===
- C.B. Black (1876), Guide to Switzerland and the Italian Lakes, Edinburgh: Adam and Charles Black

=== Turkey ===
- Demetrius Coufopoulos (1910), Guide to Constantinople (4th ed.), London: Adam and Charles Black, OL 7046206M
