= Picturesque Tourist of Scotland =

1840 travel guide by A and C Black

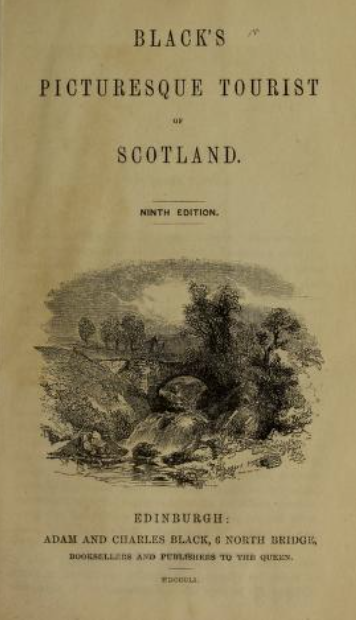
- Language: English
- Genre: History
- Publisher: A & C Black
- Publication date: 1840 (186 years ago)
- Publication place: Scotland
- Media type: Hardback book
- Pages: 494
- ISBN: 133200329X
- OCLC: 16850333

Picturesque Tourist of Scotland is a book published in 1840 by A & C Black. It was printed in Edinburgh by Robert Black.

In the book's preface, it is established that the usual approach adopted by such books, including "needless and ambitious eulogies on the beauty and grandeur of natural scenery, of which no adequate idea can be conveyed to the mind by any written description," will be replaced by "plain and intelligible accounts". The idea was that the space created by these omissions would allow the inclusion of "traditionary, historical and literary illustration".

Early editions of the book included individual tours, each in their own chapter, with many beginning in Edinburgh and Glasgow. Some tours were undertaken by road, others by rail. Later editions grouped tours by length, divided into single-day excursions from Edinburgh or Glasgow, and tours from two to fourteen days.

The 7th edition of the Picturesque Tourist of Scotland was digitised by Google Books in 2009.

== See also ==
- Black's Guides
