= Robert Kelly (surgeon) =

British professor of surgery

Sir Robert Ernest Kelly CB FRCS (7 April 1879 – 16 November 1944) was a British surgeon and professor of surgery at the University of Liverpool.

He was the younger son of iron merchant Robert Kelly of Liverpool and received his education at Liverpool Institute and University College, which was then part of Victoria University. He was among the first medical graduates of the newly established University of Liverpool and received his clinical training at Liverpool Royal Infirmary. He held positions as house surgeon and surgeon at the infirmary before becoming a consulting surgeon.

During World War I, he served as a consulting surgeon to the British Forces in Salonika holding the temporary rank of colonel. In recognition of his services, he was appointed a Companion of the Order of the Bath CB in 1916 and later served on the Army Council Medical Advisory Board.

He became part of the teaching staff of Liverpool University as lecturer in surgery and from 1922 to 1939 as professor of surgery. He was elected to the council of the Royal College of Surgeons in 1928, where he served for sixteen years, including acting as vice-president for 1938–40. He delivered the Bradshaw lecture in 1938 on "Recurrent peptic ulceration, causes of, and design for second operation on the stomach".

On his retirement he was granted the title of emeritus professor and created a Knight Bachelor in the 1939 Birthday Honours.

Kelly died in Liverpool in 1944. He was married to Averill Edith Irma, the daughter of James Edlington M'Dougall, and their daughter was the renowned art historian Alison Kelly.

== See also ==
- Charles Scott Sherrington
