= Harold Kingsley =

British Army officer (1885–1970)

Brigadier Harold Kingsley CIE DSO
- Born: 23 December 1885
- Died: 15 April 1970 (aged 84)
- Military career
- Allegiance: United Kingdom
- Branch: British Army; British India
- Rank: Brigadier
- Awards: CIE DSO

Brigadier Harold Kingsley CIE DSO (23 December 1885 – 15 April 1970) was Commandant of the Indian Military Academy (1936–1939) and Aide-de-camp to King George VI.

== Early life ==
Harold Evelyn William Bell Kingsley was born 23 December 1885 in Nenagh, Ireland. He was the son of Col. William Henry Bell Kingsley CB and his wife, Mrs Kingsley, of River View, Nenagh, Co. Tipperary. He was educated at Bedford Modern School and the Royal Military College, Sandhurst.

== Career ==
After Sandhurst, Kingsley joined the Indian Army. He was appointed Captain on 18 January 1914 and Major on 18 January 1920. During World War I, Kingsley served in Mesopotamia (1916–18) and in the Balkans (1918). He served in Russia, and Trans-Caspia (1919), the Black Sea and Turkey (1919–20) and Waziristan (1921–24). He was made Colonel in 1933.

Kingsley was Deputy Military Secretary, Army Headquarters, India (1933–36). He was Commandant of the Indian Military Academy between 1936 and 1939 and ADC to the King (1938–39). He retired in 1939.

== Awards and honours ==
Kingsley was mentioned in despatches during World War I and on service in Waziristan (1921–24). He was made DSO in 1917 and CIE in 1939.

== Personal life ==
Kinglsey was a member of the Army and Navy Club. In 1926 he married Hon. Olive Mary Kitson, daughter of James Kitson, 1st Baron Airedale; they lived at Warnford House, Warnford, Hampshire. There were no children from the marriage and Kingsley died in Hampshire on 15 April 1970.
