= Manchester Geographical Society =

Learned society and registered charity in Manchester, England

- Formation: 15 October 1884; 142 years ago
- Type: Learned society
- Registration no.: 1134626
- Legal status: Charity
- Purpose: Further pursuit of geographical knowledge Encourage/publish geographical research on/relevant to North-West England
- Headquarters: Manchester, England
- Official language: English
- Activities: Research; Publications; Lectures; Events
- Collections: Library (books, atlases, maps); Archives
- Chairman: Colin Harrison
- Website: www.mangeogsoc.org.uk

The Manchester Geographical Society (founded 1884) is a learned society and a registered charity (No. 1134626) based in Manchester, England.

== History ==
When the society was founded by a group of Manchester businessmen, it was addressed by Sir Henry Morton Stanley, the African explorer. Its original focus was on commercial and political geography, and it later contributed to the creation of the first Lecturership in Geography (held by Henry Yule Oldham) at Owen's College, Manchester in 1891, and the first Chair in Geography (held by Herbert John Fleure) at the University of Manchester in 1930. The society's museum (1901–1973) was later dispersed.

Notable individuals involved in the society's early years included Spencer, 8th Duke of Devonshire (president 1885–1892), George V (president 1892–1936), and Louis Charles Casaertelli. Among the founders was Eli Sowerbutts, who served as secretary from 1884 to 1904; his sons Harry Sowerbutts (1904–1919) and Thomas William Sowerbutts (1919–1933) also held the post. The society became a registered charity in 1963, and was incorporated as a Charitable Trust in 2010.

== Lunchtime lecture series ==
Throughout its history the society has organised an annual lecture series providing free public talks on a range of topics from September to June.

== Research fund ==
The society's research fund provides North West England university lecturers with funds for small projects.

== Bursaries and prizes ==
Each year, the society provides bursaries to enable postgraduate geography students to attend conferences. It also awards prizes for the best performance in undergraduate geography finals at the University of Manchester.

== Journal ==
North West Geography
- Discipline: History
- Language: English
- Edited by: Cathy Delaney

Publication details
- Former names: Journal of the Manchester Geographical Society (1885–1960); The Manchester Geographer (1960–93); The North West Geographer (1997–2000)
- History: 2001–present
- Frequency: Annual

Standard abbreviations
- ISO 4: North West Geogr.

Indexing
- ISSN: 1476-1580

Links
- Journal homepage

The society's published journal was The Journal of the Manchester Geographical Society (1885–1960), succeeded by The Manchester Geographer (1960–1993) and The North West Geographer (1997–2000). In 2001 it was renamed North West Geography (2001–present) and became a free online journal. The society has also published an Exploring Greater Manchester series of excursion guides.

== Library, atlas, map, and archive collections ==
The society's library (1884–1970) has been on permanent loan to the University of Manchester Library since 1970. It contains books on Britain (especially North West England), 19th and 20th-century exploration, and travel and geography in Europe, Oceania, Africa, Asia, and the Americas. Its map collection, comprising more than 2,000 items from the 18th to 20th centuries, covers Africa, other continents, Admiralty charts, and related ephemera. The society's atlas collection (on loan to the John Rylands Library in Manchester) dates from 1701. The society's archives (1884–2010) have also been deposited at the University of Manchester Library.
