= The Leader (Allahabad newspaper) =

English-language newspaper in India

The Leader (24 October 1909 – 6 September 1967) was one of the most influential English-language newspapers in India during British Raj. Founded by Madan Mohan Malviya, the paper was published in Allahabad. Under C. Y. Chintamani, a dynamic editor from 1909 to 1934, it acquired a large readership in North India. His clash with Motilal Nehru over issue of his freedom as editor, meant that Motilal left within a year, thereafter between 1927 and 1936, Chintamani was not only the Chief Editor of the newspaper, but also the leader of the opposition in the U. P. Legislative Council. Indian National Congress leader, Moti Lal Nehru was the first Chairman of the Board of Directors of the Leader, and the paper remained politically charged through its existence, many of Mahatma Gandhi's writings were also published in it, and it is repository of important writing of that generation.

== Archives ==
The Duke University Library System has newspaper copies from 1963 to 6 September 1967 on microfilm, apart from British Library, Asia, Pacific and African Collections and University of Cambridge, South Asian Studies Centre.
