= Isabel Fidler =

Australian academic (1869–1952)

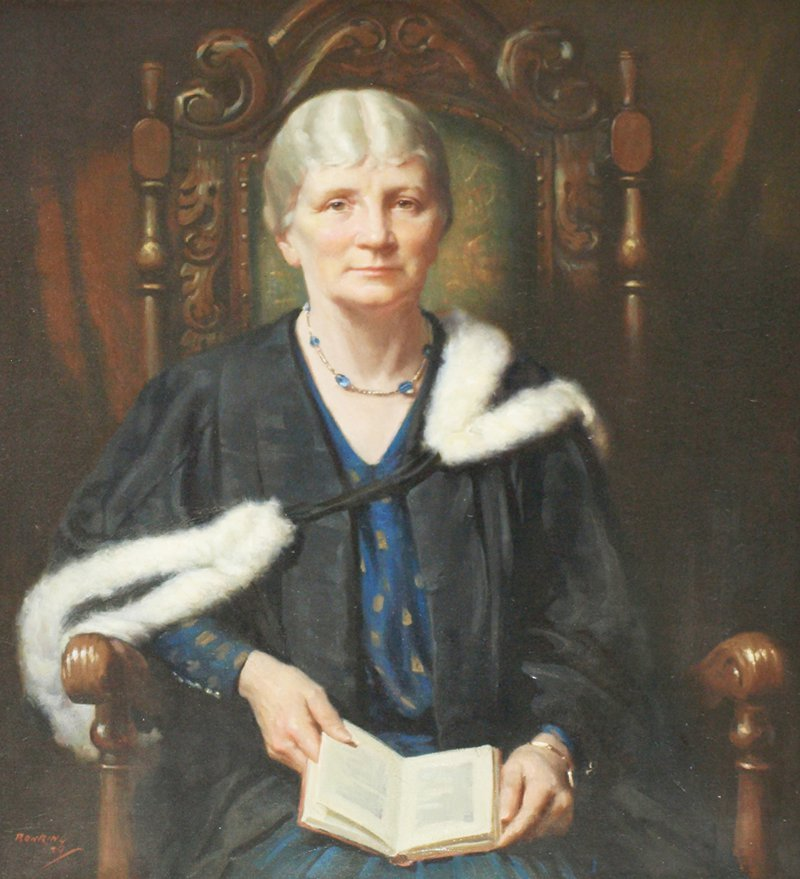
- Portrait of Fidler, 1929
- Born: 21 March 1869; Sydney, Colony of New South Wales
- Died: 5 June 1952 (aged 83); Lindfield, New South Wales, Australia
- Education: University of Sydney
- Employer(s): University of Sydney, Presbyterian Ladies' College, Sydney

Isabel Margaret Fidler MBE (21 March 1869 – 5 June 1952) was an Australian academic and advocate for women's education. She held various roles at the University of Sydney: principally tutor to women, president and vice-president of the Sydney University Women's Association (later known as the Women's Union). She also represented the interests of women in education on the education committee of the National Council of Women and at international conferences. She has been recognised by the university with a room in Manning House, and a nearby lawn named in her honour. She was made a Member of the Most Excellent Order of the British Empire in 1939.

== Early life and education ==
Fidler was born on 21 March 1869 in Wollongong, the second child of Alice Maude Bedford and William Fidler, a Wesleyan minister. She was educated at Emily Baxter's Argyle School in Surry Hills, where she won academic prizes.

In 1895 Fidler began her studies for a Bachelor of Arts in English, French and Latin at the University of Sydney, and graduated with first-class honours in 1898.

== Career ==
Immediately after graduating, Fidler taught for two years at Presbyterian Ladies College, Croydon.

Fidler was employed by the University of Sydney as "tutor to women students" in 1900. She also served many terms as president of the University of Sydney Women's Union, first in 1903, including when the Union occupied Manning House from 1917, and continued in that role for much of the rest of her career. She was president of the Sydney University Women Graduates' Association. She chaired the Sydney University Women's Social Service Society, through which she led the formation of the University Women's Settlement House in Chippendale. She also chaired the committee on International Relations of the Australian Federation of University Women. She also served a long term as vice-president of the University Women's Sports Association. The number of female students at the University of Sydney rose from around 70 when she was first employed, to over 800 at the time of her retirement in 1939.

Fidler was one of the most prominent advocates for women's education in the university system in New South Wales. Outside the university, Fidler was a long term committee member of education committee of the National Council of Women, and was involved in founding the Good Film League and the Board of Social Study and Training. In 1930, she attended the conference of the International Council of Women in Vienna, and the conference of the British National Council of Women at Portsmouth.

== Death ==
Fidler died on 5 June 1952 in hospital at Lindfield. She was cremated with Baptist forms.

== Recognition ==
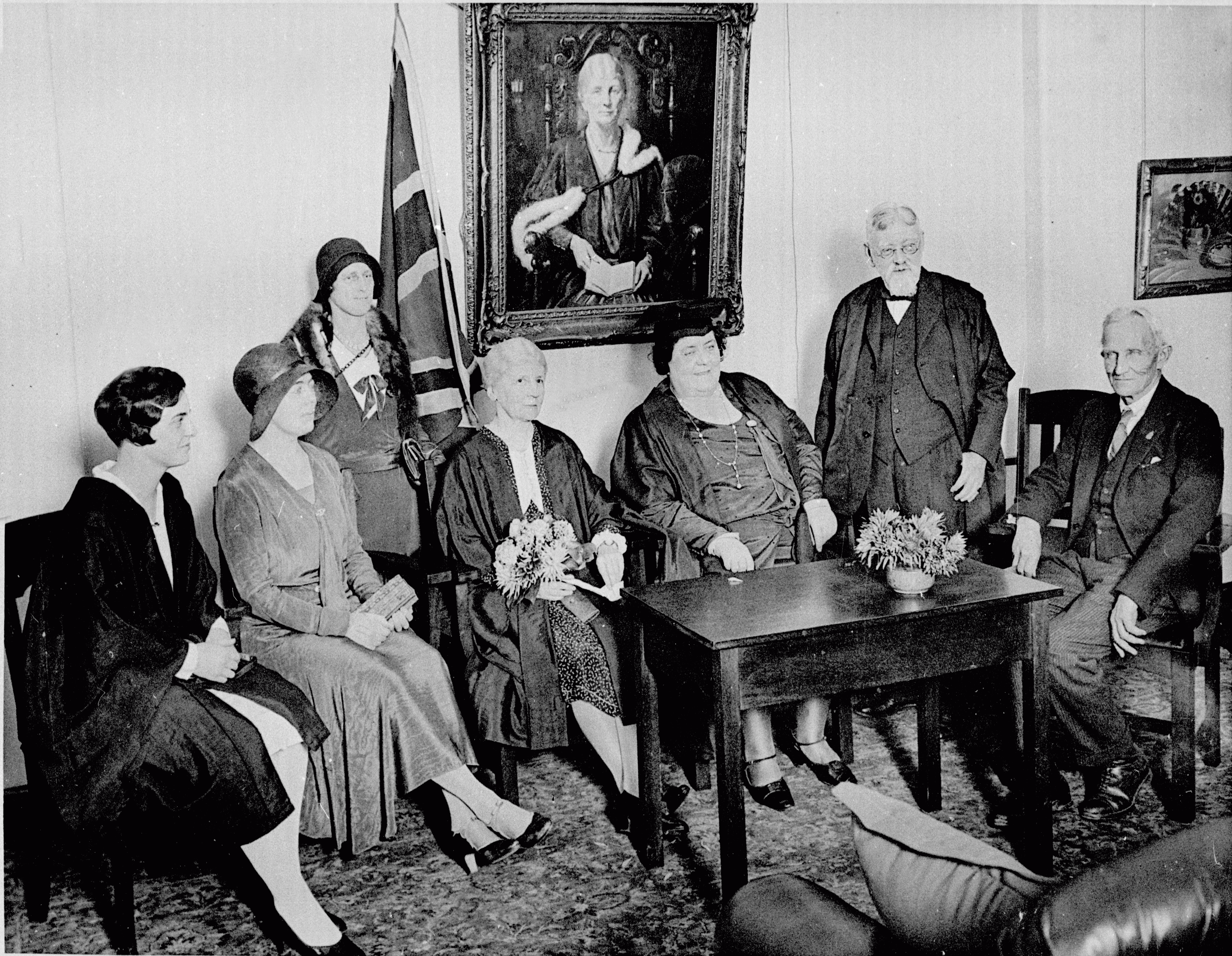
Official Party at the Unveiling of the Portrait of Isabel Fidler in Manning House in 1931

A portrait of Fidler by Walter Armiger Bowring was exhibited in the Archibald Prize, and presented to the university by a group of subscribers in honour of her contributions. It was unveiled in 1931, and hangs in Manning House.

After her retirement the reading room in Manning House was named the Isabel Fidler Room.

Fidler was honoured as a Member of the Most Excellent Order of the British Empire in 1939.

A holiday home associated with the University Settlement was also named after Fidler on her retirement from that organisation in 1945.

After her death, a memorial garden was created in her honour, consisting of an oval lawn with a rising embankment designed by Professor Denis Winston.
