= L. Edna Walter =

English chemist and nursery rhyme collector (1866–1962)

The Fascintation of Switzerland (1912), one of Walter's travel books

Lavinia Edna Walter MBE (usually publishing as L. Edna Walter, 1866–1962) was an English chemistry teacher and children's author. She carried out a systematic trial of the heuristic method of teaching in a girls' school before becoming an inspector and advisor on schools for the British government. She published several children’s books of travel writing and songs, including collections of British and European nursery rhymes.

== Early life, education, and chemistry research ==
Lavinia Edwardena Walter was born in Finsbury in 1866 to jeweller and pawnbroker Thomas Walter and Tabathia Beeston.

She was educated at the North London Collegiate School for Girls, and studied at the Normal School of Science from 1887 to 1889. She received a BSc from the University of London in 1889.

Walter became a research student of Henry Edward Armstrong in 1889. Armstrong remained an admirer of Walter's work, visiting the school she taught at in 1901.

In 1893, she collaborated with John Young Buchanan on a design for a projective goniometer, which they presented at the Soirée of the Royal Society. In 1895, she published a paper on the derivatives of sulphanilic acid in the Proceedings of the Chemical Society.

== Teaching and schools inspecting ==
In 1895, she began teaching at the Central Foundation Girls' School in east London, where she was responsible for 'organizing the science work of the School'. She was a proponent of the heuristic method of teaching, on which she published a paper in 1896; her work was praised as an early and thorough trial of the method in a girls' school. She also argued that the chemistry of 'the laboratory' should be taught rather than domestic science, a point she argued at the International Congress on Technical Education in 1897. She gave occasional lectures on science teaching in girls' schools at the Maria Grey College in 1897.

In 1901, she became the first woman to be appointed an Inspector under the Board of Education (Science and Art Department). She also advised on laboratory design at Colston's Girls' School in 1902. By 1939, she was also serving on the Schools Advisory Sub-Committee.

== Writing ==
In the 1910s, Walter published a series of European travel writing featuring her photographs, which she also presented as lectures at the Manchester Geographical Society. She contributed to the Peeps at Many Lands series published by A & C Black.

She collected Christmas carols and nursery rhymes, including examples from across Europe. She collected the Belgian examples from munitions workers she befriended during World War I, and collaborated with Lucy Broadwood on the work. Her most popular work was a highly illustrated Mother Goose’s Nursery Rhymes (1919).

== Later life ==
In 1939, Walter was awarded an MBE for her work on the Schools Advisory Sub-Committee and the National Savings Committee.

She died in Richmond, Surrey in 1962.
