= John Humphrey Wise =

Sir John Humphrey Wise, KCMG, CBE (11 March 1890 – 21 October 1984) was a British colonial administrator. A member of the Indian Civil Service, he spent almost his entire career in British Burma, where he held key positions.

The son of William Wise, of Ashbourne, Derbyshire, and St Servan, France, John Wise was educated at Christ's Hospital and University College, Oxford. Joining the Indian Civil Service in 1914 and went out to Burma. Shortly after, the First World War began, and Wise joined the Indian Army Reserve of Officers. He saw service with the 92nd Punjabis in India, Mesopotamia, Egypt and Palestine, and was mentioned in despatches several times.

After the war, Wise held a succession of appointments, mainly in Burma with one posting to Delhi. At the outbreak of the Second World War, Wise was Controller of Supplies, then evacuated to India with the Governor of Burma, Sir Reginald Dorman-Smith. He was Counsellor to the Governor of Burma from 1940 to 1946.
