= C. Y. Chintamani =

Indian editor, journalist, liberal politician and parliamentarian

Sir Chirravoori Yajneswara Chinthamani
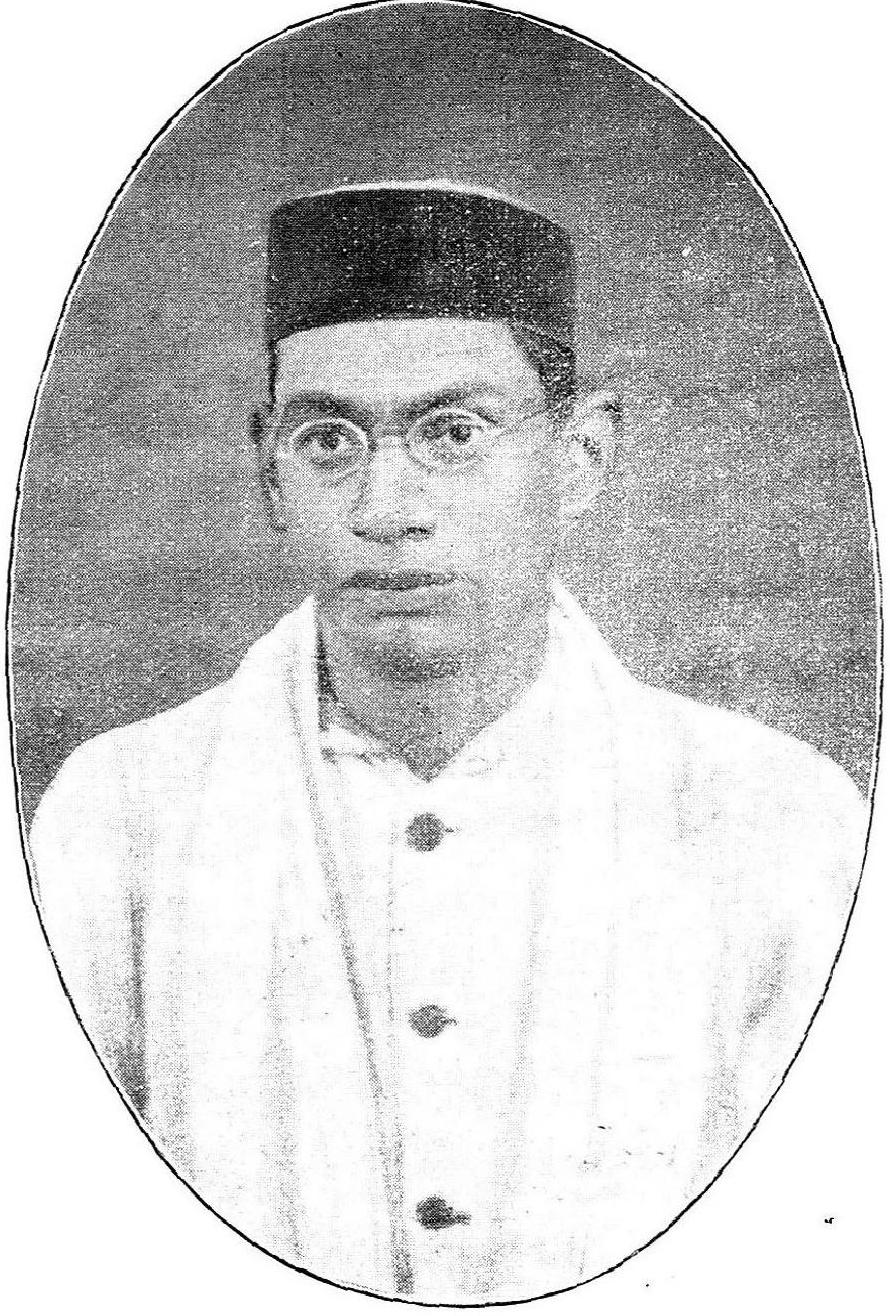
- Portrait of Chinthamani in 1911
- Born: 10 April 1880
- Died: 1 July 1941 (aged 61)
- Occupations: journalist, politician

Sir Chirravoori Yajneswara Chintamani (10 April 1880 – 1 July 1941) was an Indian editor, journalist, liberal politician and parliamentarian.

== Life ==
He was born on the Telugu New Year's Day (ugadi) at Vizianagaram, Andhra Pradesh, India. He was called the "Pope of Indian Journalism" by noted Indian statesman Sri V. S. Srinivasa Sastri.

At 18, he became the editor of the newspaper Vizag Spectator. He eventually bought the paper and renamed it Indian Herald. He also worked with Madras Standard under the editorship of G Subramania Iyer.

He was Chief editor of the Allahabad-based, The Leader between 1909 and 1934. His clash with Motilal Nehru, Chairman of the Board of Directors over issue of his freedom as editor, meant that Motilal left within a year, thereafter between 1927 and 1936, Chintamani was not only the Chief Editor of the newspaper, but also the leader of the opposition in the U. P. Legislative Council.

Chintamani was appointed as the Education Minister of the United Provinces of British India as a part of the Dyarchy scheme of the Government of India Act 1919. He was invited as a delegate to the First Round Table Conference at London in 1930-1931.

Mahatma Gandhi and the British administrators and the Indian People were greatly inspired by his editorials. He was knighted in the 1939 Birthday Honours list; his knighthood was formally conferred by George VI on 20 September.
