= Charles George Hawes =

British engineer

Charles George Hawes CIE MC
- Born: 7 March 1890; Nuddea, Bengal, India
- Died: 30 December 1963 (aged 73)
- Education: Bedford Modern School
- Known for: Chief Engineer and Secretary to the Government of Sind

Charles George Hawes CIE MC (1890–1963) was a British engineer, hydrologist and colonial administrator in the Indian Engineering Service. He became Chief Engineer and Secretary to the Government of Sind and also served with distinction in both World Wars.

== Career ==
Charles George Hawes was born on 7 March 1890. He was educated at Bedford Modern School and the City and Guilds College from where he graduated in 1911 with the degree of B.Sc.. After spending one year with the Special Reserve of Officers, he joined the Indian Engineering Service in 1912 as Assistant Engineer in the Bombay Public Works Department. In this capacity he worked on the construction of the Bhandadara Dam and the Bhatghar Dam.

During the First World War Hawes served in the Royal Engineers (Signals) at Gallipoli, Palestine and Egypt from 1915 to 1919. He commanded the 54th Divisional Signal Company for two years and was awarded the Military Cross.

In 1919 he returned to India as Resident Assistant Engineer of the Bombay Public Works Department. In 1922 he was transferred to the province of Sind and was appointed successively; Executive Engineer (1922–34), Superintending Engineer at the Northern Sind Circle (1935–40) and Chief Engineer and Secretary to the Government of Sind (1941–43). He was appointed CIE in the 1939 Birthday Honours.

From 1943 to 1945 he served as temporary Brigadier in the Royal Engineers at India Command's GHQ (Engineer-in-Chief's branch).

== Later life ==
After the War Hawes retired from the Indian Engineering Service and settled at South Brent, Devon. He continued to act as a consultant on various irrigation projects, particularly in Africa.

Hawes married Marion Terrick Sworder and they had two daughters. He died on 30 December 1963.
