= 1946 New Year Honours (New Zealand) =

Annual awards for New Zealanders

The 1946 New Year Honours in New Zealand were appointments by King George VI on the advice of the New Zealand government to various orders and honours to reward and highlight good works by New Zealanders, and to celebrate the passing of 1945 and the beginning of 1946. They were announced on 1 January 1946.

The recipients of honours are displayed here as they were styled before their new honour.

== Privy Councillor ==
- William Joseph Jordan – high commissioner for New Zealand in the United Kingdom.
- The Honourable Walter Nash – minister of finance and customs.
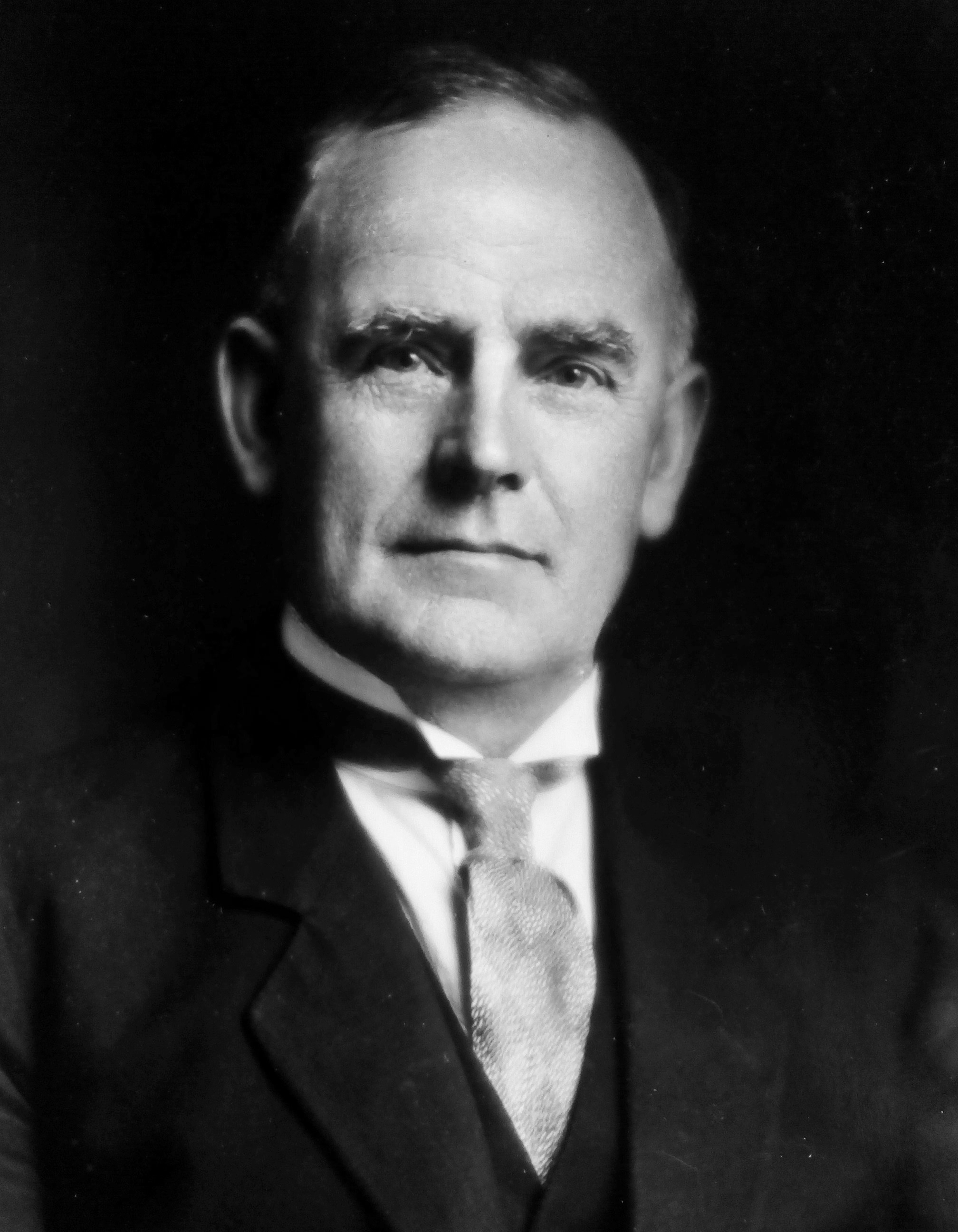
Bill Jordan

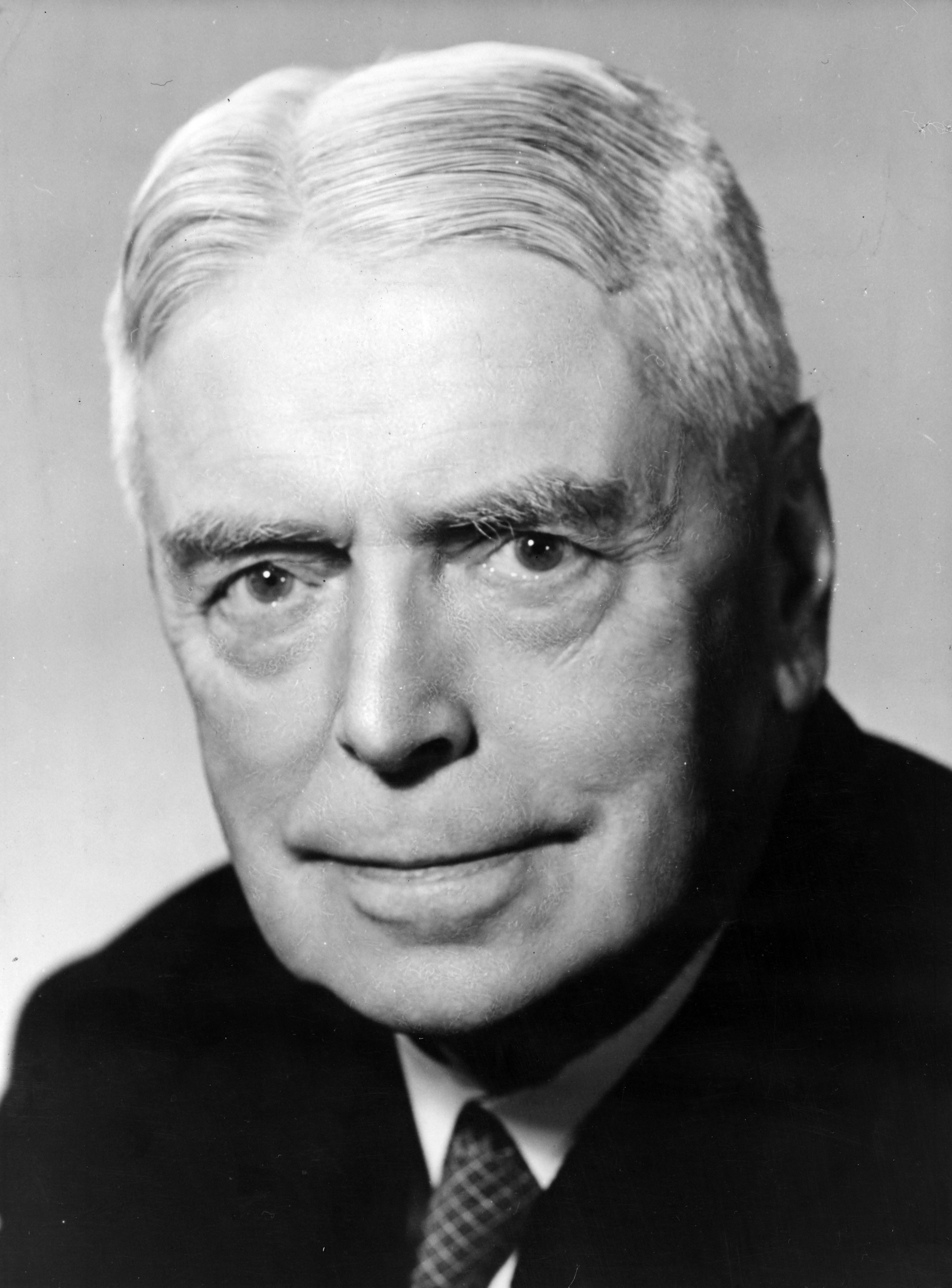
Walter Nash

== Knight Bachelor ==
- The Honourable Archibald William Blair – senior puisne judge of the Supreme Court.
- James Fletcher – of Wellington. For public services.
- The Honourable William Perry MLC – member of the War Cabinet and of the War Council.
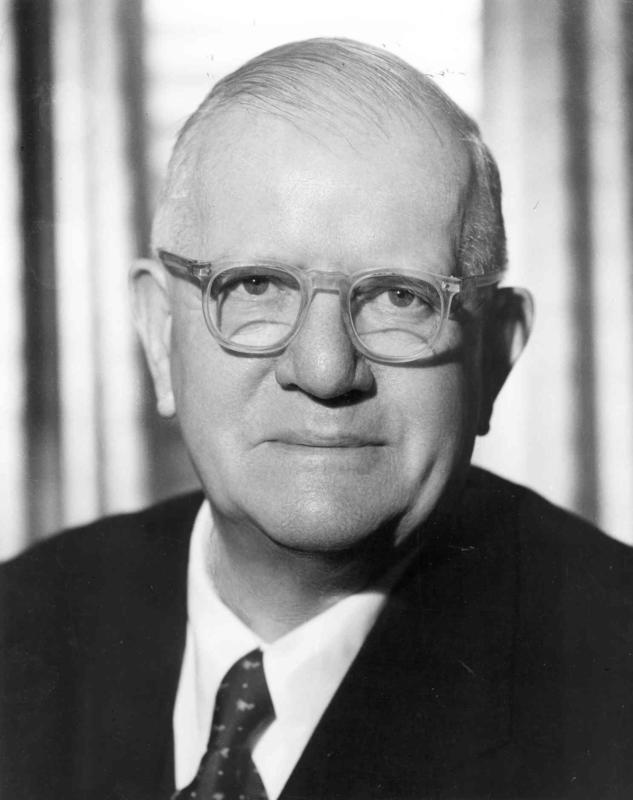
Sir James Fletcher

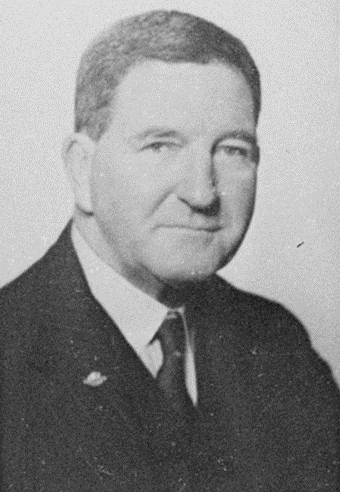
Sir William Perry

== Order of the Bath ==
=== Knight Commander (KCB) ===
Military division

- Lieutenant-General (temporary) Edward Puttick CB DSO – New Zealand Military Forces.
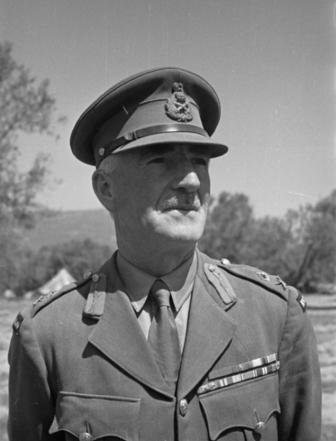
Sir Edward Puttick

=== Companion (CB) ===
Military division

- Brigadier (temporary) Leonard George Goss – New Zealand Military Forces.

== Order of St Michael and St George ==
=== Knight Commander (KCMG) ===
- Carl August Berendsen CMG LLM – New Zealand Minister to the United States of America, formerly permanent head of the Prime Minister's Department, Secretary of External Affairs and Secretary to the War Cabinet.
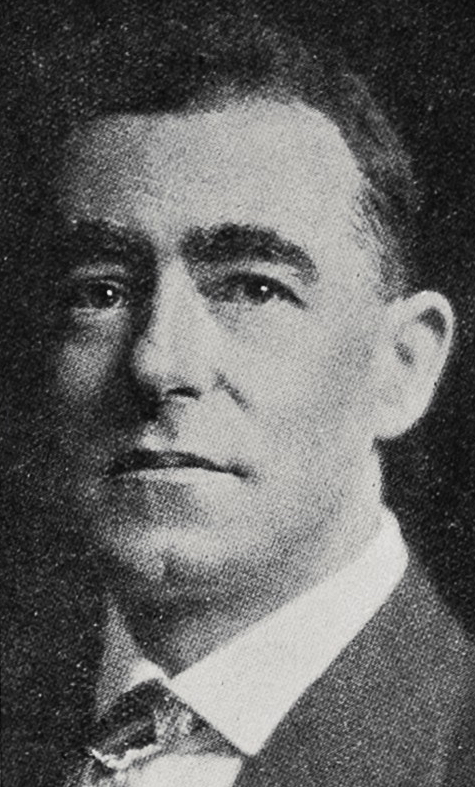
Sir Carl Berendsen

=== Companion (CMG) ===
- Bernard Carl Ashwin – Secretary to the Treasury.
- John Henry Boyes – Public Service Commissioner.
- Cyril George Collins – formerly Controller and Auditor-General.
- Ernest Marsden CBE MC DSc – Secretary, Department of Scientific and Industrial Research.
- Francis Raymond Picot – Commissioner of Supply.
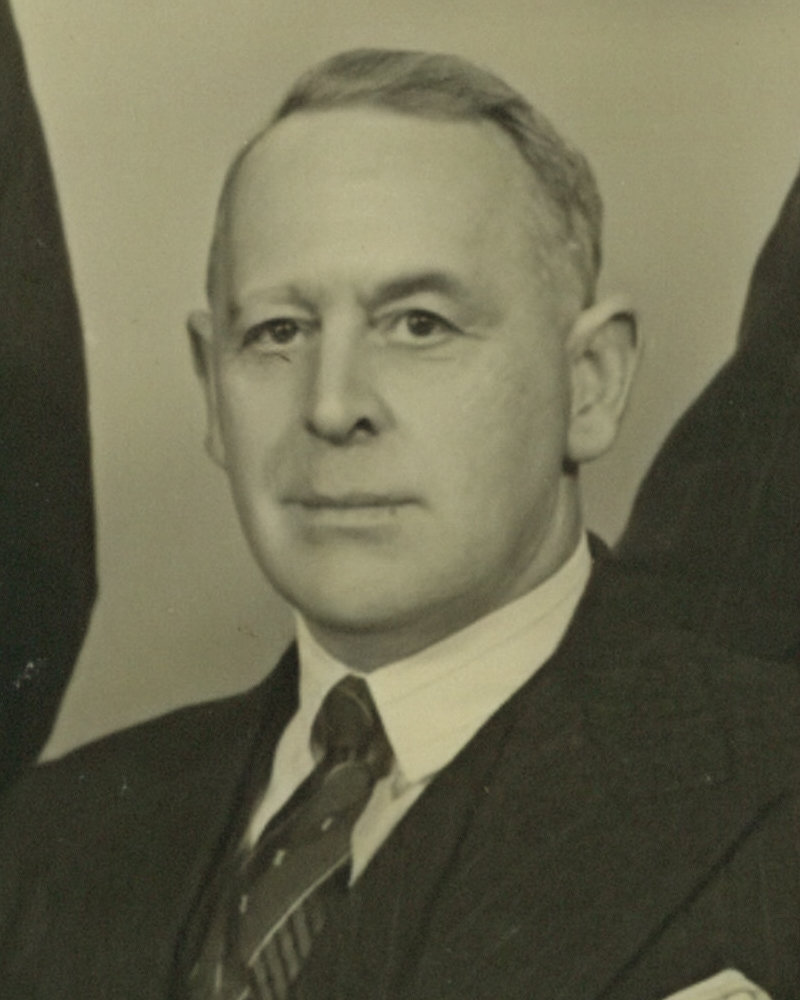
Bernard Ashwin

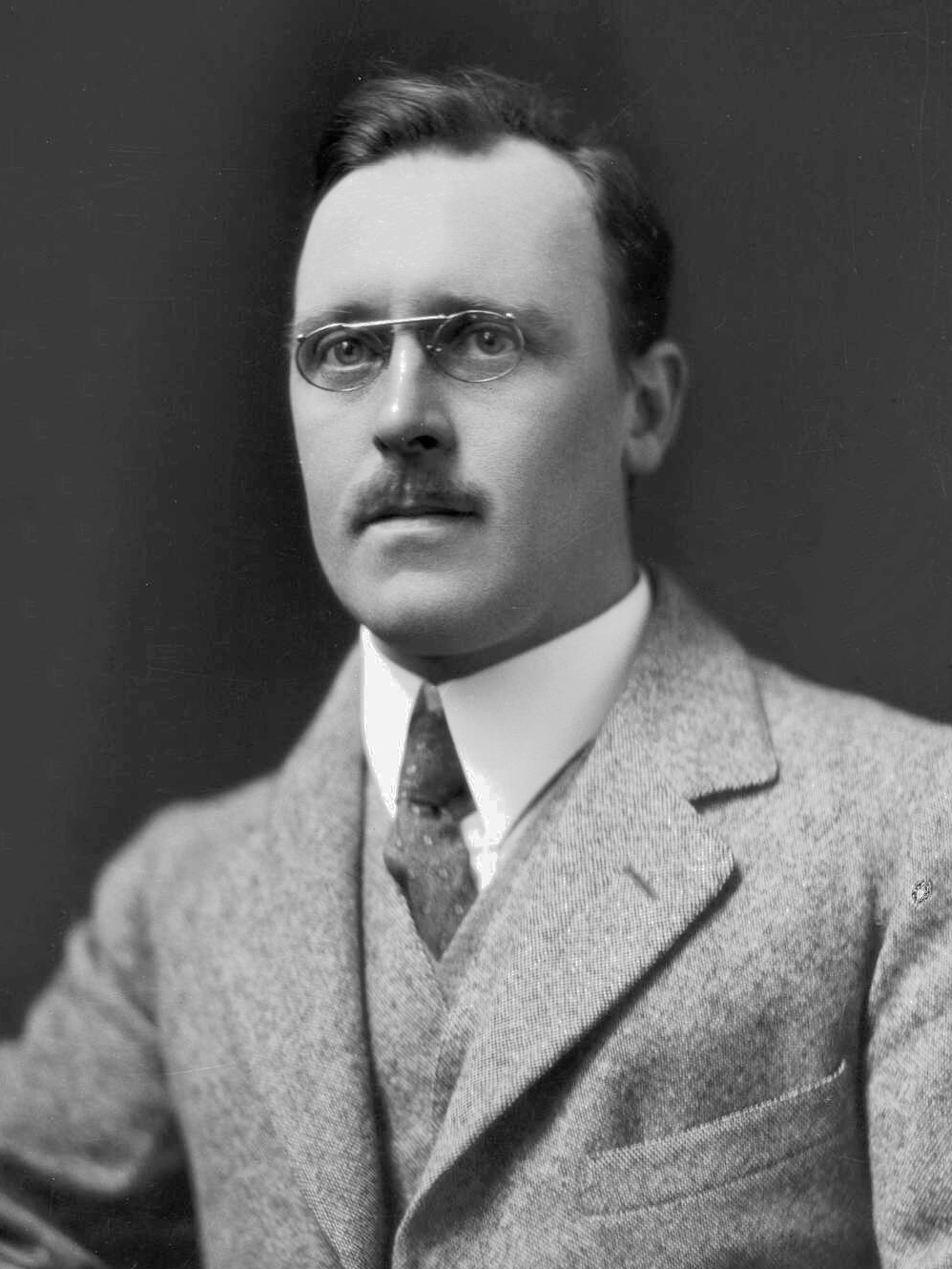
Ernest Marsden

== Order of the British Empire ==
=== Knight Commander (KBE) ===
Civil division

- Alfred Clarke Turnbull – Administrator of the Mandated Territory of Western Samoa.

Military division

- Major-General (temporary) Fred Thompson Bowerbank OBE MC ED MD FRCPE FRACP – New Zealand Medical Corps.
- Air Vice-Marshal Leonard Monk Isitt CBE – Royal New Zealand Air Force.
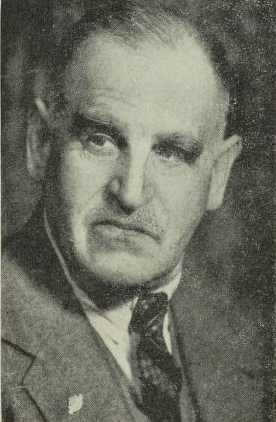
Sir Alfred Turnbull

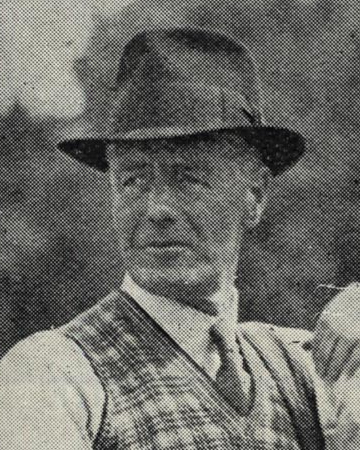
Sir Fred Bowerbank

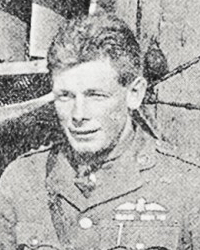
Sir Leonard Isitt

=== Commander (CBE) ===
Civil division

- Andrew Henson Allen. For patriotic, and social welfare services during his period of office as mayor of Dunedin.
- John Andrew Charles Allum – mayor of Auckland. For patriotic and social welfare services.
- Ernest Herbert Andrews – mayor of Christchurch. For social welfare and patriotic services.
- Eugene Casey – formerly general manager, Railways Department.
- Denis Joseph Cummings – Commissioner of Police.
- George Andrew Duncan – director, Export Division, Marketing Department.
- David Emmet Fouhy – official secretary to the Governor-General.
- George Arthur Hayden – secretary, National Patriotic Fund Board.
- James Stanley Hunter – Director of National Service and of the Organisation for National Development.
- William Marshall. For services to industry and commerce.
- Frederick Millett Sherwood – private secretary to the Minister of Defence.
- The Honourable Vincent Aubrey Ward – a Member of the Legislative Council. For patriotic and social welfare services.
- John George Young – formerly Director-General, Post and Telegraph Department.

Military division

- Group Captain Trevor Watts White ED – Royal New Zealand Air Force.
- Acting Group Captain Gordon Hamish Martin Pirie – Royal Air Force.
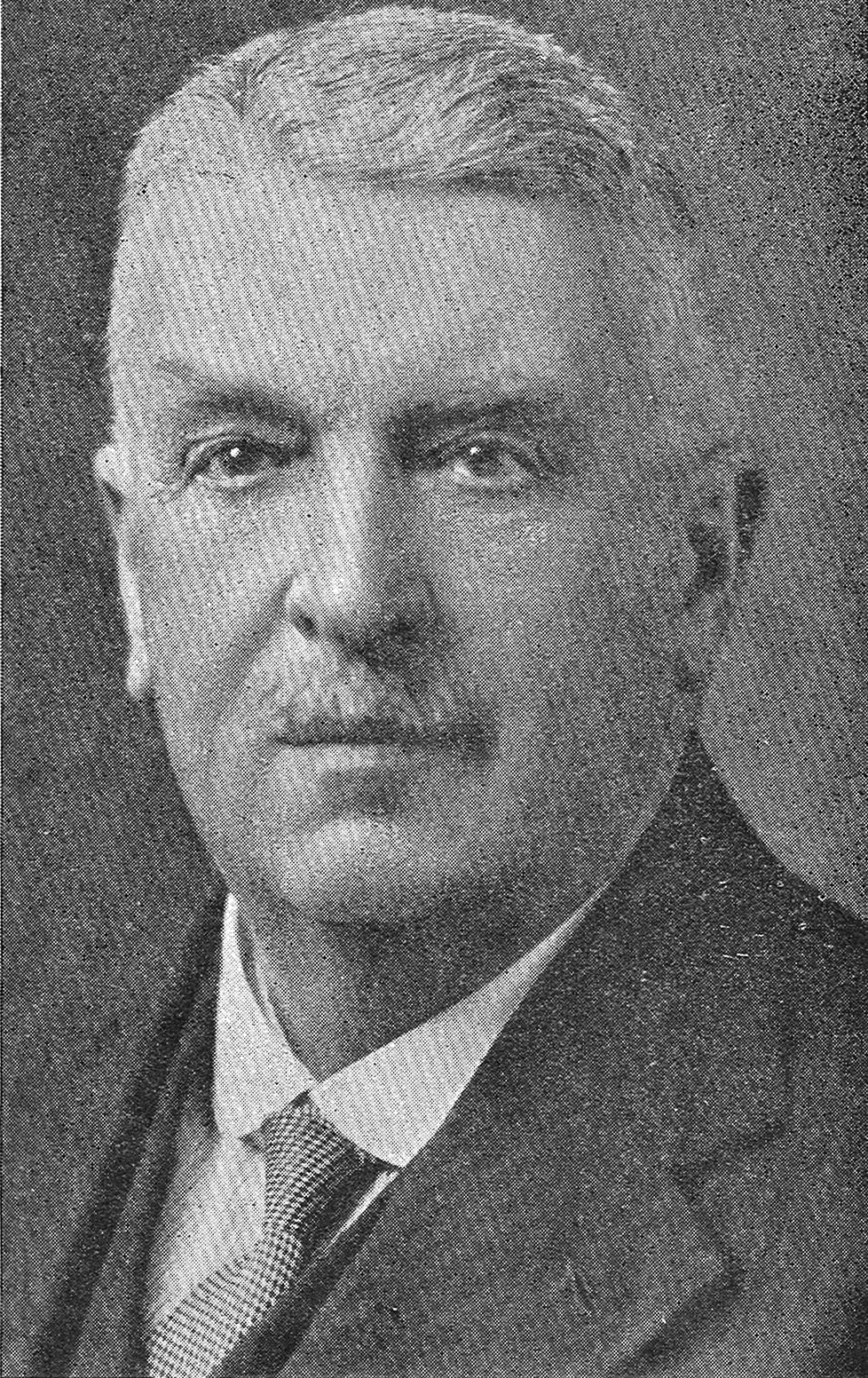
Andrew Allen

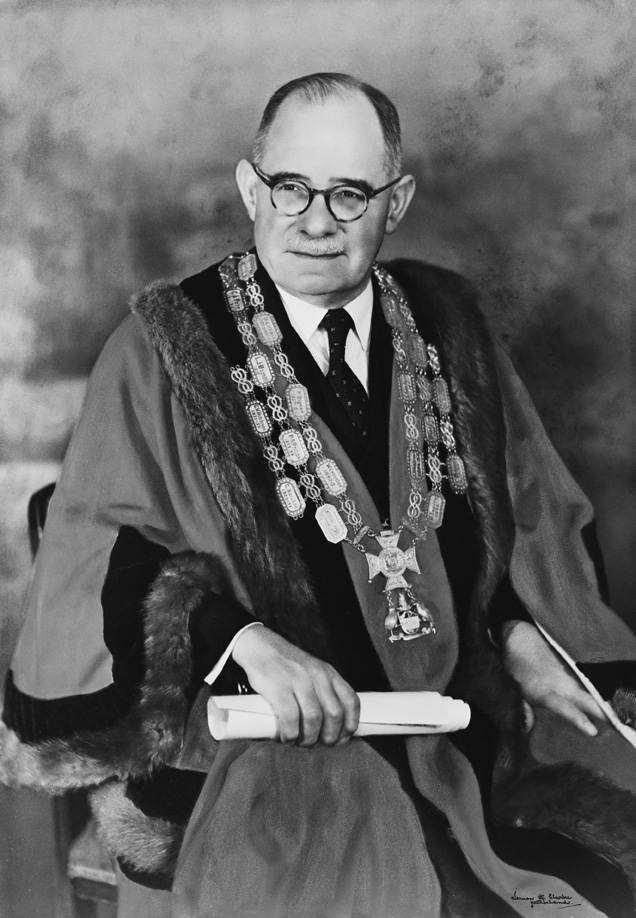
John Allum

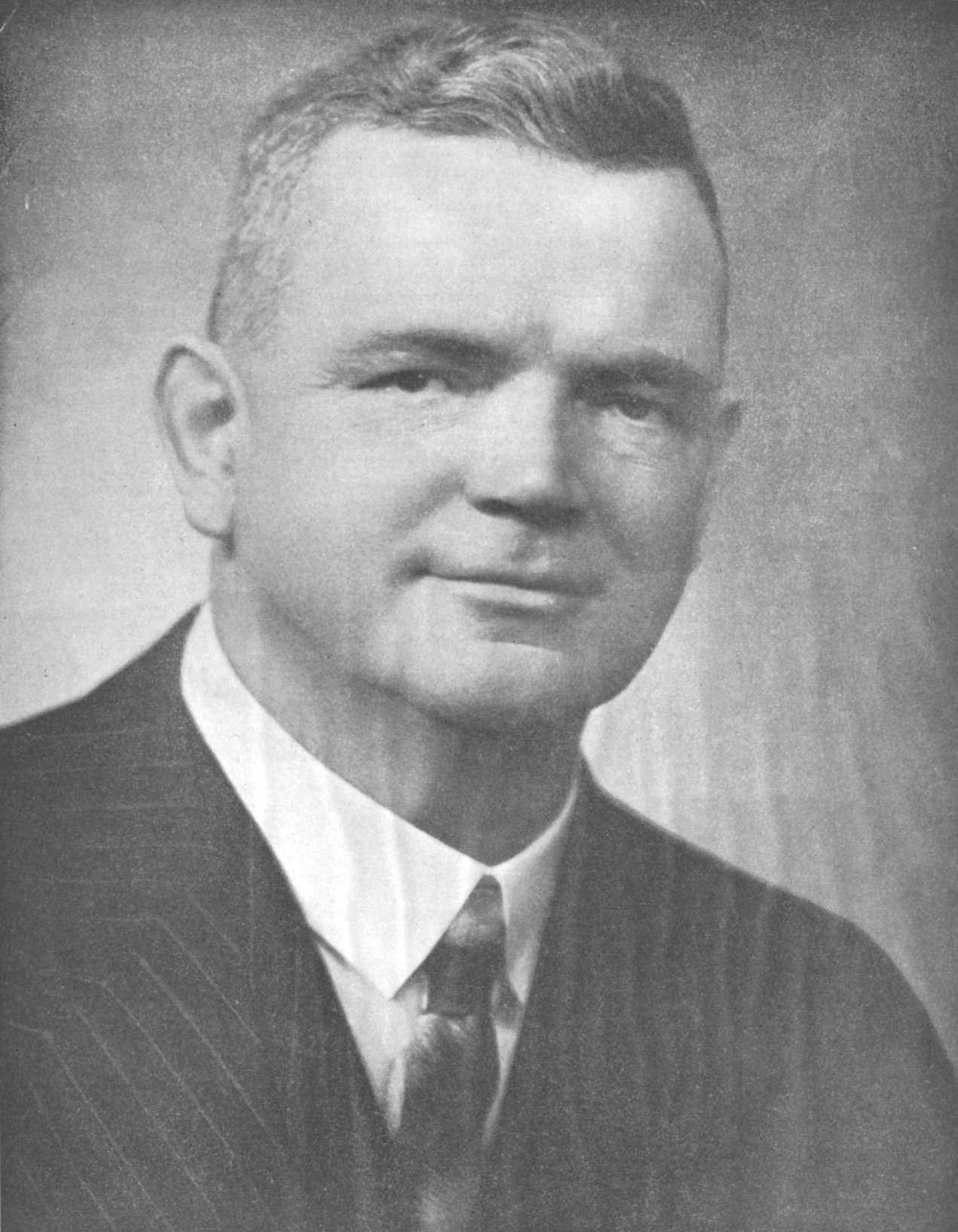
Eugene Casey

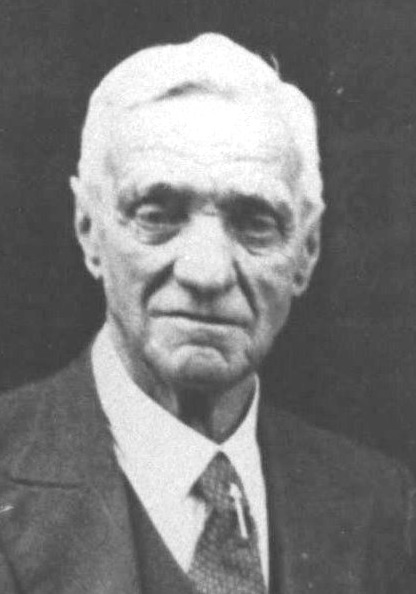
Ernest Andrews

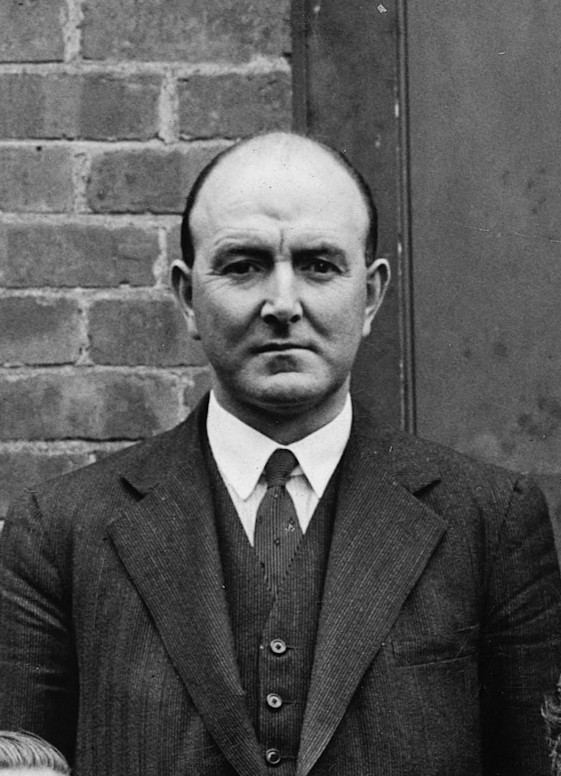
George Duncan

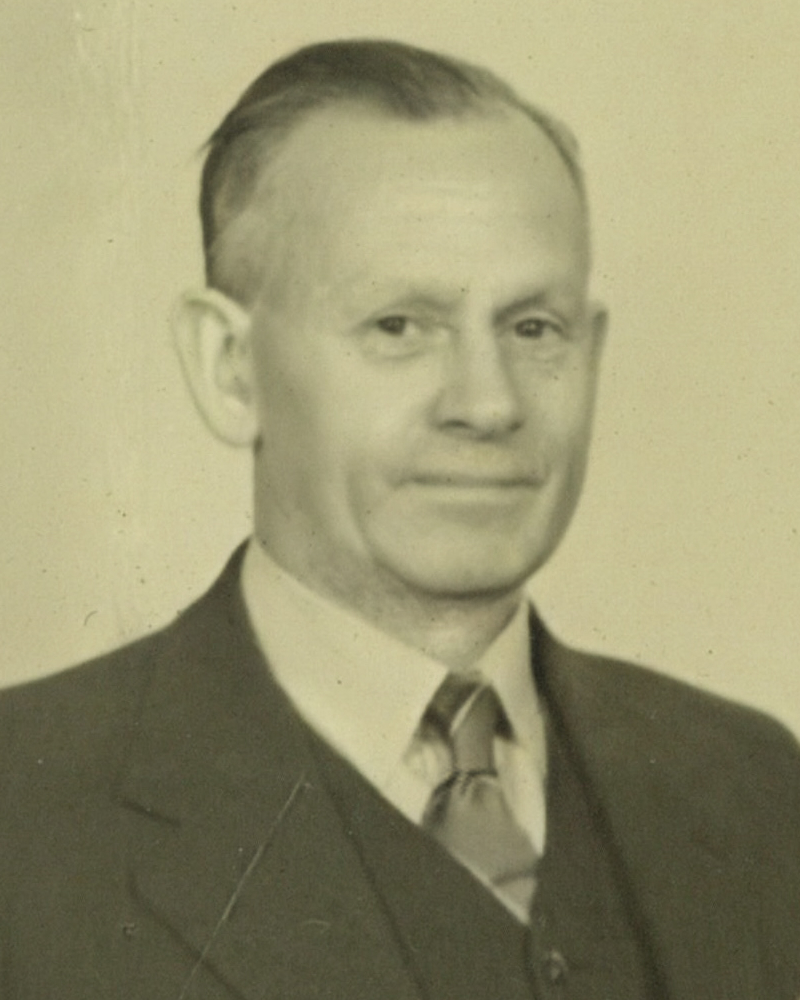
William Marshall

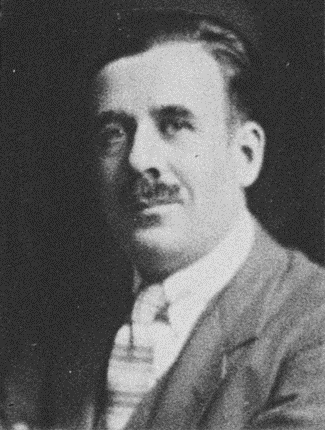
Vincent Ward

=== Officer (OBE) ===
Civil division

- Annie Constance Affleck – inspector, Office of the Public Service Commissioner.
- Lillian Banks – matron, Palmerston North Public Hospital, and president of the Registered Nurses Association.
- Mary Jane Bentley – of Wellington. For services in organising women's war movements.
- John Balmain Brooke. For services in connection with the production of munitions.
- Cyril Blake Burdekin MBE – a member of the staff of the New Zealand High Commissioner in London. For services to the New Zealand prisoners of war organisation.
- Colonel Frederick William Burton – field secretary, and secretary of the War Services Committee of the Salvation Army.
- Ronald Alan Candy – a member of the National Council of Primary Production.
- Hector Christie. For patriotic and social welfare services in connection with the organisation of the Boy Scouts movement.
- The Right Reverend Monsignor Thomas Frederick Connolly – chairman of the Catholic Services War Fund Board.
- Robert Darroch – secretary, Navy League War Council.
- David Alexander Ewen MBE – a member of the Supply Council.
- Charles Stuart Falconer – chairman, War Services Committee, Young Men's Christian Association.
- Clarence Richard Charles Gardiner. For patriotic and social welfare work on behalf of members of the New Zealand Armed Forces in India during the war.
- Elizabeth May Knox-Gilmer – of Wellington; chairwoman of the Lady Galway Patriotic Guild.
- Everard Robert Cranston Gilmour – chairman of the New Plymouth Patriotic Council.
- Israel Joseph Goldstine – of Auckland. For patriotic and social welfare services.
- Len Joseph Greenberg – of the National Service Department.
- James Norman Greenland – a member of the Supply Council.
- Lieutenant-Colonel Harry Campbell Hemphill. For valuable public service in relation to the Māori war effort.
- Thomas William Hercock – chairman of the Hawkes Bay Provincial Patriotic Council.
- Ailsa Craig Dalhousie Hislop – of Wellington. For services in connection with social welfare movements for women in the armed forces and industry.
- Alfred Joseph Hutchinson – of Auckland. For services to the blind.
- George Henry Jackson – a member of the Supply Council.
- Bertram Joseph Jacobs – president of the New Zealand Returned Services Association. For valuable services in connection with the welfare of servicemen.
- Alexander Howat Johnstone KC. For services in relation to the war effort.
- Arthur Selwyn Kempthorne – secretary of the Church of England Military Affairs Committee.
- John Craigie Kirkness – mayor of Oamaru. For patriotic and social welfare services.
- Augustus Edward Mansford – mayor of Palmerston North. For patriotic and social welfare services.
- Robert Whiteford Marshall – director of the New Zealand Supply Mission in the United States of America.
- William Walter Mulholland – president of the Farmers' Union.
- Charles Norman Machell Watson-Munro – director of the Radio Development Laboratory, Scientific and Industrial Research Department.
- Edgar Rollo Neale – chairman of the Nelson Provincial Patriotic Council and member of the Nelson Patriotic Fund Board.
- Walter Richard Newall – of Wellington. For services in connection with the national savings campaign.
- Robert Hamilton Nimmo. For patriotic and social welfare services during the war.
- Charles Henry Tarr Palmer – president of the Navy League in the City of Auckland.
- George Pascoe – of Wellington; factory controller.
- Robert Everett Price – a member of the Waterfront Control Commission.
- Algernon Instone Rainbow – chairman of the Provincial Patriotic Zone Committee, Hastings.
- Barbara Reid – of Wellington. For social welfare services on behalf of members of the armed forces.
- Violet Agnes Russell. For honorary services rendered in connection with canteen and hospital work to members of the New Zealand forces in London during the war.
- Sidney Rattery Skinner – naval affairs officer for New Zealand in London.
- Thomas Norman Smallwood. For services in connection with the national savings campaign.
- Joseph Thomas Spears – of Wellington. For services to New Zealand prisoners of war.
- Kingi Tahiwi. For services in connection with the organisation of the Māori war effort.
- James Ewing Thomas – Foods Rationing Controller.
- Abraham Wachner – mayor of Invercargill. For patriotic and social welfare services.
- Charles Gilbert White. For services to the New Zealand Red Cross Society.
- Leonard John Wild – principal of Feilding Agricultural High School, and a member of the National Council of Primary Production.
- Donald Macdonald Wilson MC MB ChB. For services to the Casualty Clearing Hospital in the City of Wellington.
- Rupert Samuel Wogan. For public services throughout the war.

Military division

- Acting Commander John Churchill Elworthy – Royal Navy (Retd).
- Hermione Ruth Herrick – chief officer, Women's Royal New Zealand Naval Service.
- Lieutenant-Colonel (temporary) Douglas George Ball – New Zealand Military Forces.
- Colonel (temporary) Arthur Bongard MC – New Zealand Military Forces.
- Lieutenant-Colonel (temporary) Walter Archer Breach – New Zealand Military Forces.
- Lieutenant-Colonel Alfred John Coutts – New Zealand Military Forces.
- Lieutenant-Colonel (temporary) Henry Ernest Erridge – New Zealand Military Forces.
- Lieutenant-Colonel Richard Allen Hogan – New Zealand Military Forces.
- Lieutenant-Colonel (temporary) Frederick William Mothes MBE – New Zealand Military Forces.
- Lieutenant-Colonel (temporary) Caswall John Walter Parsons – New Zealand Military Forces.
- Lieutenant-Colonel (temporary) John Hugh Phillipps – New Zealand Military Forces.
- Lieutenant-Colonel (temporary) James Donald Swan – New Zealand Military Forces.
- Colonel (temporary) Donald George Wallace MB ChB – New Zealand Medical Corps.
- Lieutenant-Colonel (temporary) Harry Waine Washbourn – New Zealand Dental Corps.
- Matron Katherine Sybil Williams – New Zealand Army Nursing Service (attached to the Royal New Zealand Air Force).
- Group Captain Frederick Russell Chisholm MD MRCS FRCP – Royal New Zealand Air Force.
- Wing Commander Edward Caradus – Royal New Zealand Air Force.
- Acting Wing Commander John Matthias Gamble – Royal New Zealand Air Force.
- Acting Squadron Leader Hayden Hugh James Miller AFC DFC – Royal New Zealand Air Force; of Morrinsville.
- Acting Wing Officer Elsie Naomi Carlyon – New Zealand Women's Auxiliary Air Force.
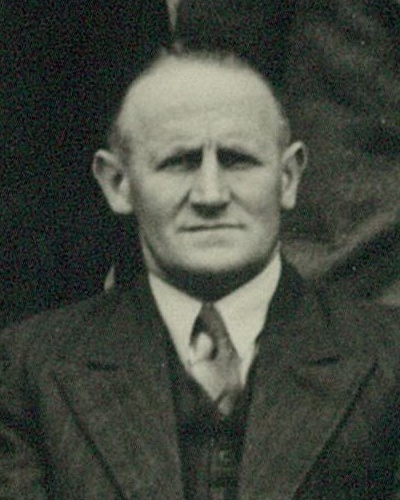
Alan Candy

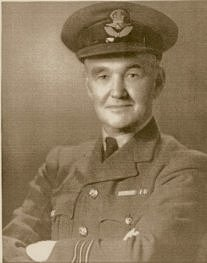
Edward Caradus

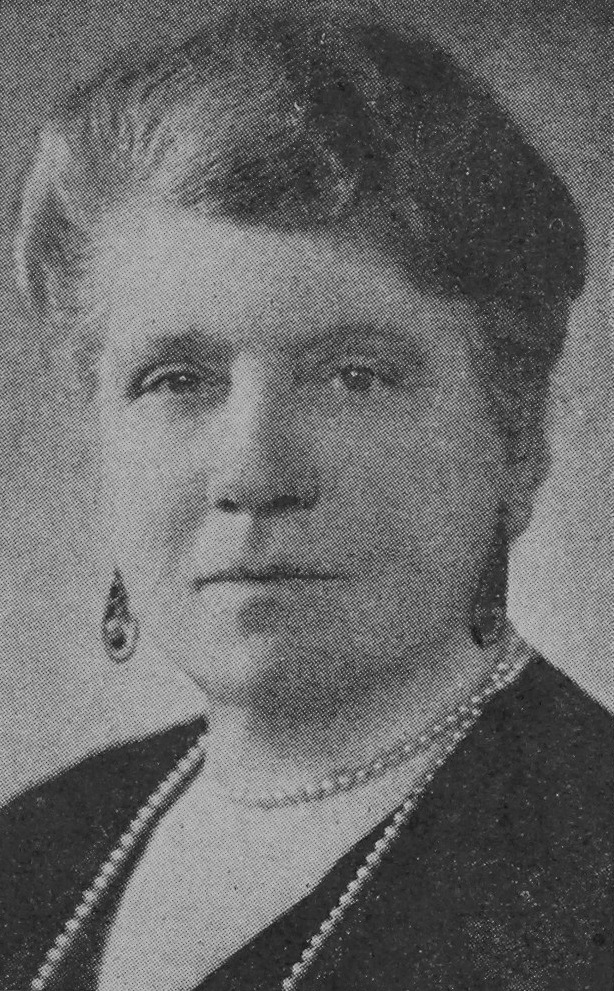
Elizabeth Knox-Gilmer

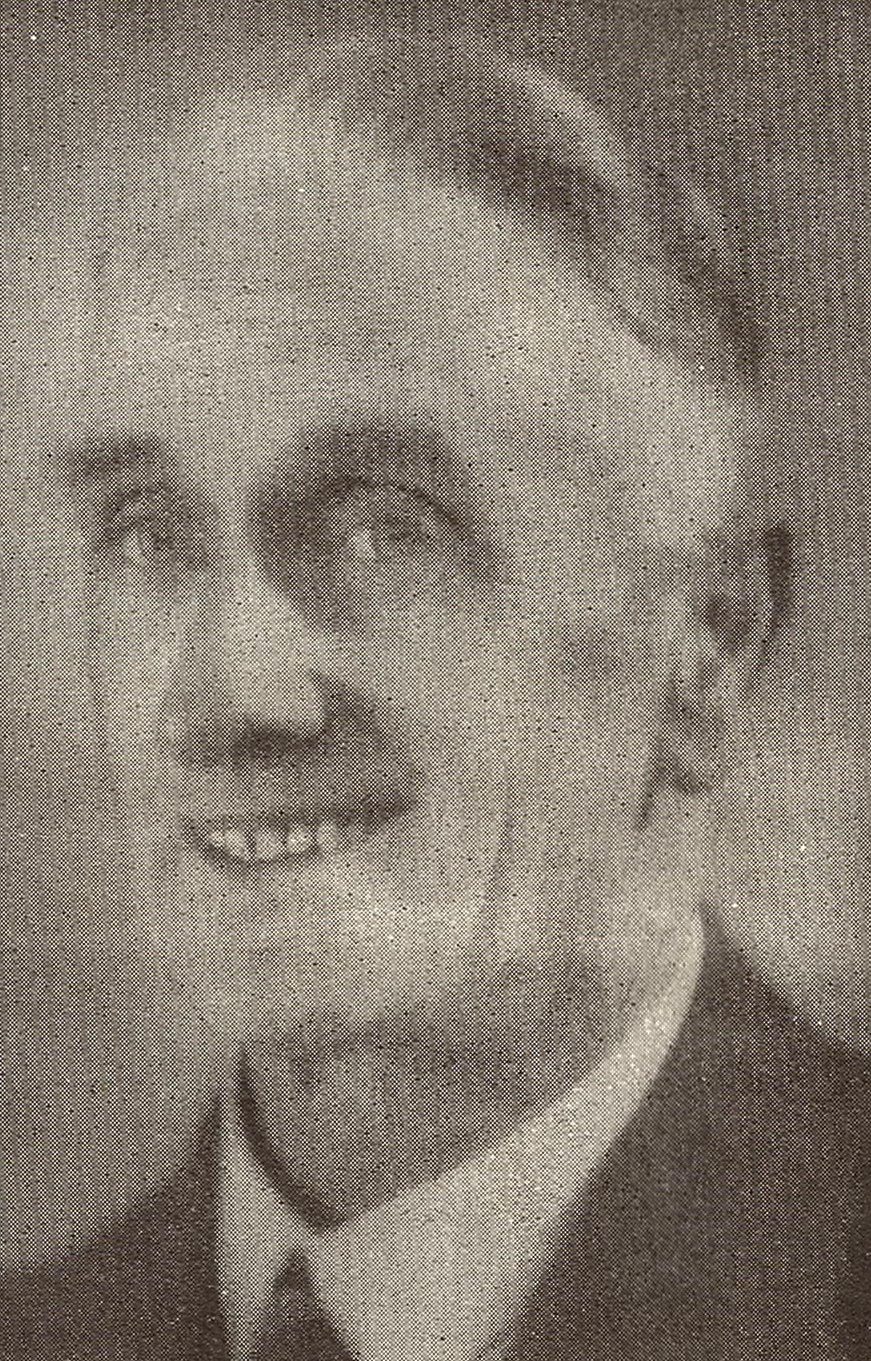
Everard Gilmour

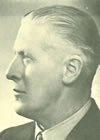
Bill Hercock

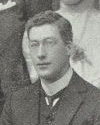
Alexander Johnstone

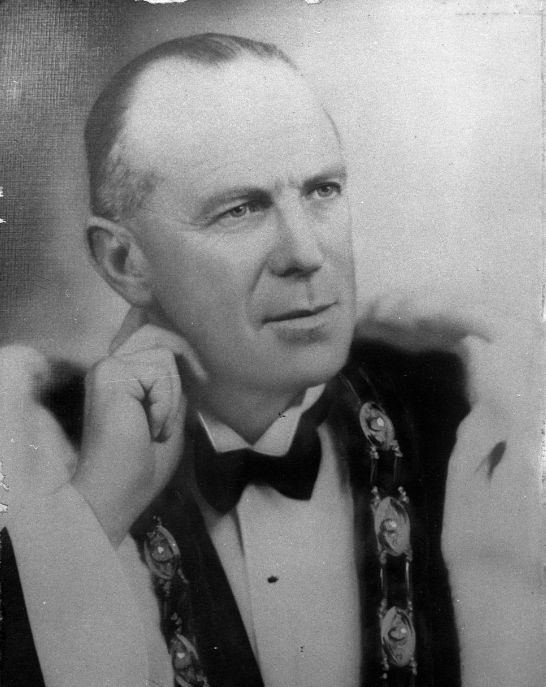
Gus Mansford

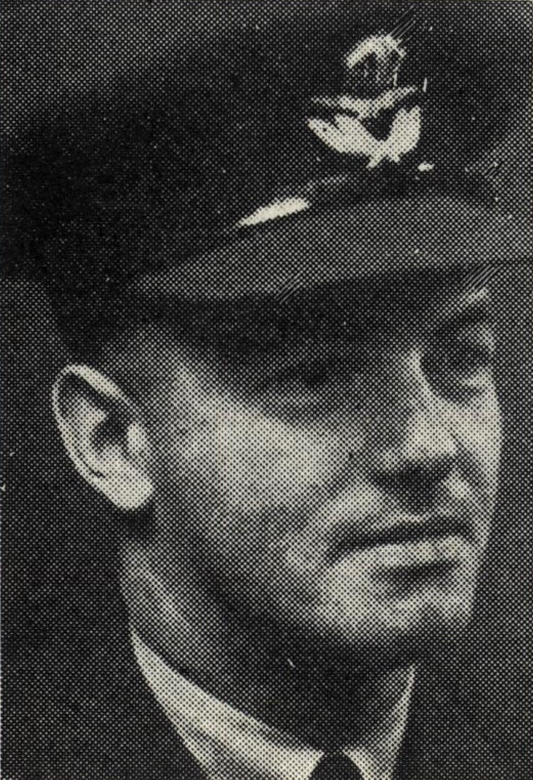
Hugh Miller

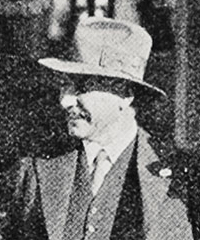
Walter Mulholland

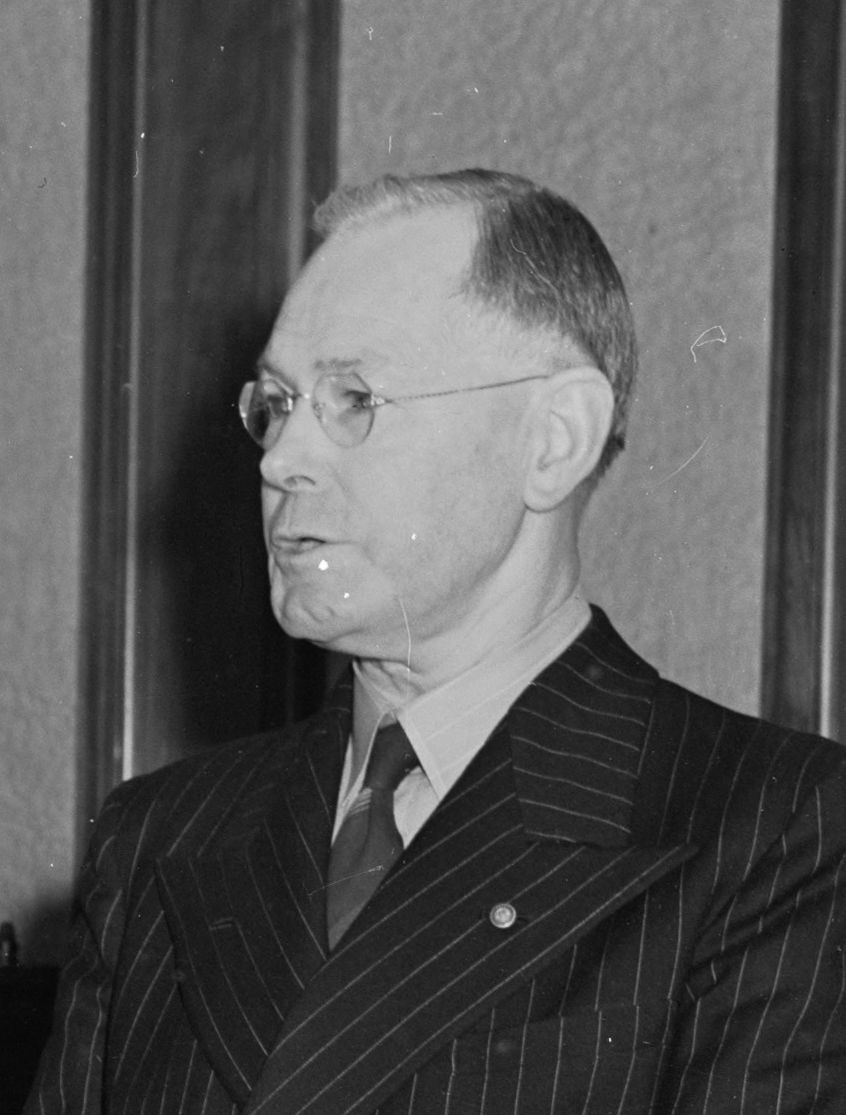
Edgar Neale

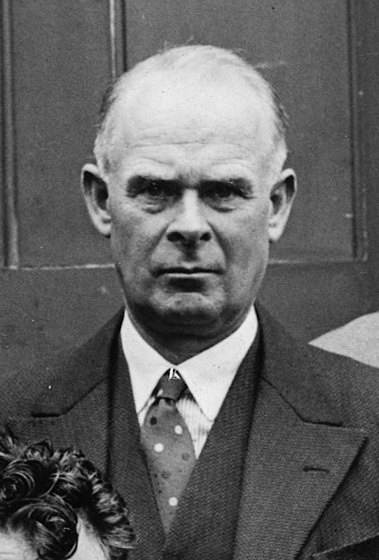
George Pascoe

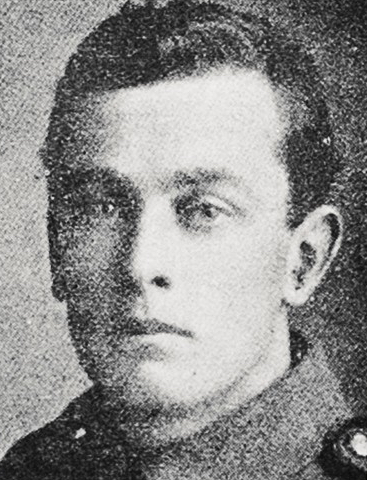
Jack Phillipps

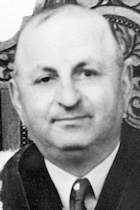
Abraham Wachner

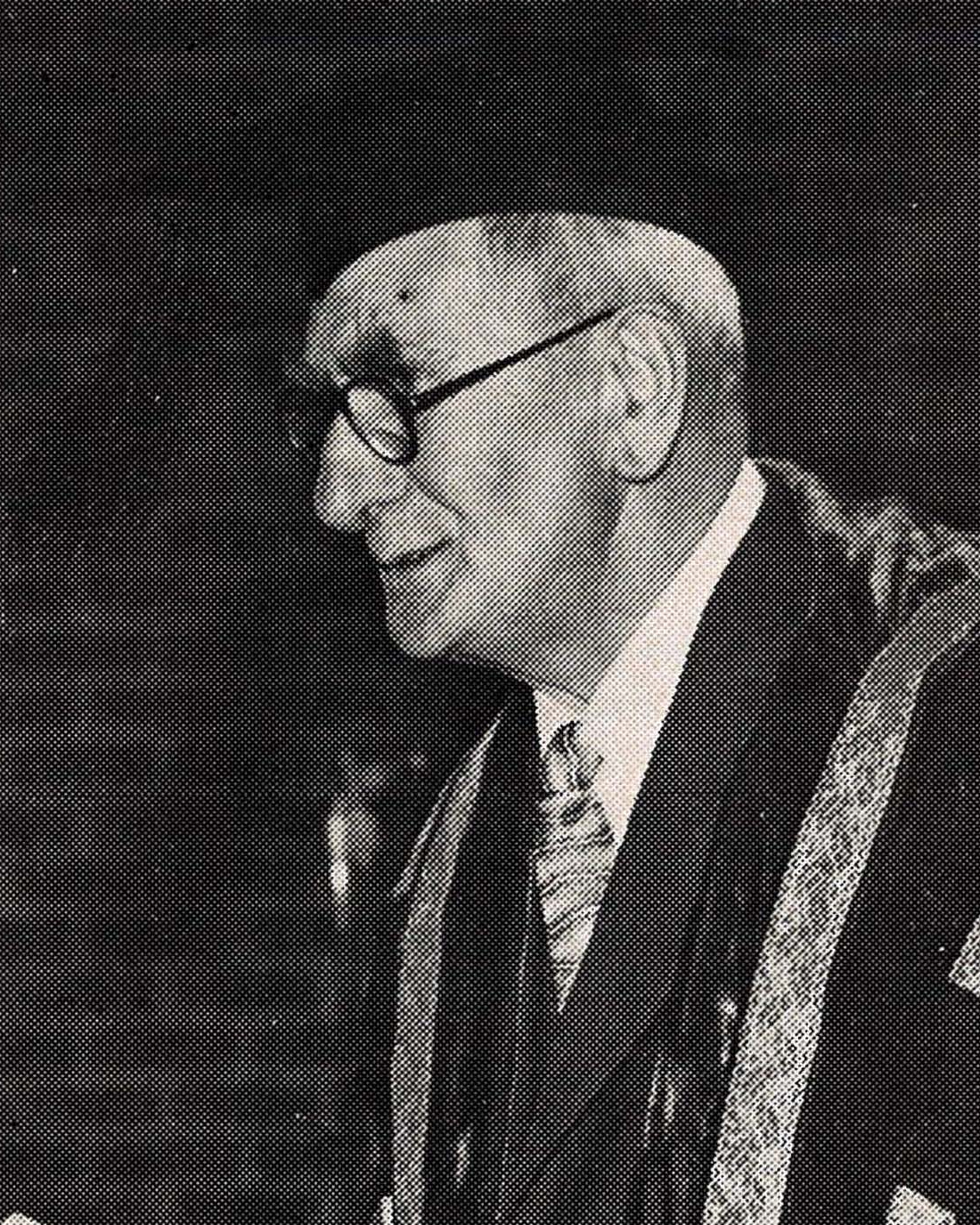
Leonard Wild

=== Member (MBE) ===
Civil division

- Joseph Abel. For patriotic and social welfare services.
- Rebecca Isobel Victoria Aitken. For services to the Red Cross.
- Etta Elaine Allen. For services in connection with women's patriotic activities.
- Annie Allum. For services in connection with women's patriotic activities.
- Margaret Andrews. For patriotic and social welfare services.
- Rose Appleton – a member of the Lady Gaiway Patriotic Guild.
- Dorothy Annie Atmore. For patriotic and social welfare work.
- George John Blake Barber. For public services during the war.
- Margaret Mills Barclay. For services to the munitions industry.
- Doris Laura Barton. For services in organising woman's war activities.
- Jean Blacker – of Auckland. For public services during the war.
- Thomas Francis Patey Briggs – shipping officer, Naval Store Department, His Majesty's New Zealand Dockyard, Auckland.
- Ernest Escort Brooking – a member of the National Patriotic Fund Board and of the Wellington Metropolitan Committee.
- Madeline Harriett Ledwell Browne – confidential typist, Prime Minister's Department.
- Margaret Sheila Bull – of Gisborne. For patriotic and social welfare work.
- Blanche Nima Burke. For voluntary services in London on behalf of New Zealand prisoners of war.
- James Leslie Burnett – of Whakatāne. For patriotic and social welfare work.
- Margaret Campbell – of Auckland. For patriotic services.
- Mabel Castle – organiser of canteen workers at Trentham Military Camp.
- Charles Nicholas Cathie – of Wellington. For services to war industries.
- Gladys Chapman. For services in connection with women's war movements in the Hamilton district.
- Fred Evans Chappell – secretary of the Young Men's Christian Association in Trentham Military Camp.
- Jean Olgar Christianson – of Christchurch. For services to the munitions industry.
- Laurence Hugh Clapham. For patriotic and social welfare work during the war.
- Ada Vera Cocker – of Auckland. For services in connection with women's war movements.
- Agnes Connolly – of Dunedin. For services in connection with women's war activities.
- Doris Crawford – of Hastings. For social welfare services.
- Helen Iris Crooke – head of the Red Cross Voluntary Aid Division.
- George William Dell – of Christchurch. For patriotic and social welfare work.
- Annie Jean Dickinson. For services to the Casualty Clearing Hospital in the City of Wellington.
- Mary Manson Dreaver – of Auckland. For services in connection with recruiting for the Women's Land Army.
- The Reverend Arthur Rowley Ebbs. For social welfare services rendered to members of the New Zealand forces in the Commonwealth of Australia.
- Hewitt Edwards – of Auckland. For services to war industries.
- Albert Richard Elcock – chairman of the Westland Provincial Patriotic Council.
- Mary Ann Ellen. For patriotic and social welfare services.
- Annie Allan, Lady Elliott – of Wellington. For services to the Order of St John.
- Beryl Inez Ellis. For services in connection with the Patriotic Hut, Hamilton.
- Grace Mac Adam Evans. For services to the Red Cross.
- Elizabeth Maud Faithfull. For services to the Red Cross Emergency Precautions Service.
- Linda Ferguson. For social welfare services rendered to members of the New Zealand forces in the Commonwealth of Australia.
- Jeanie Gardner Fougere MB ChB. For services to women's war organisations.
- Meta Frances Fussell. For social welfare and patriotic work during the war.
- Ethel Marion Gould – of Auckland. For social welfare services to members of the New Zealand Military Forces.
- Laurie Oliver Hall. For patriotic and social welfare services.
- Arthur Merlin Harding – New Zealand Police Force. For services rendered in relation to aliens prior to, and during the period of the war.
- Marie Henrietta Hargest – of Invercargill. For patriotic and social welfare services.
- Minnie Gregory Havelaar – of Christchurch. For services in organising women's war movements.
- Mabel Roseline Heaphy. For services as organiser of canteen workers at Trentham Military Camp.
- Ottoline Valerie Hole – commandant, Red Cross Transport Organisation, City of Wellington.
- Elsie Mary Hyslop – of Upper Hutt. For patriotic services during the war.
- Violet Ivy Inkster – chairman, Women's War Service Auxiliary.
- William Montrose Jenkins – honorary secretary, Gisborne Provincial Patriotic Council.
- Agnes Gilmour Kent-Johnston – of Hastings. For patriotic and social welfare services.
- Frederick Johnson – assistant secretary, Department of Industry and Commerce, and deputy chairman of the Linen Flax Management Committee.
- William Jones – mayor and chairman of the Provincial Patriotic Council, Whangārei.
- Edith Miriam Jordan – of Masterton. For patriotic and social welfare services during the war.
- Betty Marion Kensington – records clerk, HM New Zealand Dockyard, Auckland.
- Mary Josephine Killery – of Petone. For patriotic services.
- Frederick Arthur Kitchingham – chairman of the Provincial Patriotic Zone Committee, Greymouth.
- Ella Fernie Logie – of Lower Hutt. For social welfare services during the war.
- Geraldine Emily Luckie – of Wellington, a member of the Lady Galway Patriotic Guild.
- Marie Agnes Malempre – secretary, Women's War Service Auxiliary.
- Laurel Grace Barker McAlister – of Timaru; a member of the Women's War Service Auxiliary.
- Elizabeth Hazel McCaldon – of Kaiapoi. For public services during the war.
- Ivy McCready – of Auckland. For patriotic and social welfare services.
- James Duncan McGuire – an instructor at St Dunstans, City of Auckland.
- Captain Francis Arthur McIndoe – of Wellington. For social welfare work on behalf of members of the Merchant Navy.
- Christina McKane – of Greymouth. For patriotic and social welfare services.
- Margaret Elizabeth Meek – of Napier. For patriotic and social welfare services.
- Amy Gladys Miller – Dominion superintendent of voluntary aids, Order of St John, New Zealand.
- Frank Mitchell – honorary secretary, Nelson Provincial Patriotic Council.
- Ellen Constance Morice – honorary secretary, Air Force Relations, City of Wellington.
- Walter George Neild. For services in connection with patriotic movements.
- Maisie Amelia Nobel. For public services.
- William Henry Paul. For patriotic and social welfare services on behalf of members of the forces in the Hamilton district.
- Teresa Margaret Peckston. For services in connection with the organisation of the obstetrical section, St John Voluntary Aids Division.
- Mary Victoria Cracroft Polson. For services in connection with recruiting of the Women's Land Army.
- Reuben Charles Porter – of Auckland. For services to war industries.
- Daisy Vida Chalmers Pottinger – of Dunedin. For services in connection with women's patriotic and social welfare activities during the war.
- Julie Robertson – of Gisborne. For patriotic and social welfare services.
- Catherine Ross – of Upper Hutt. For services as organiser of canteen workers at Trentham Military Camp.
- Record Reign Ross – of Hamilton. For public services during the war.
- William Douglas Sanders – of Blenheim. For services to the linen flax industry.
- Ethel May Scott, of Wanganui. For patriotic and social welfare services.
- Rose Elizabeth Seddon. For social welfare services on behalf of members of the Royal New Zealand Air Force.
- Mary Phydlis Franklyn Shallcrass – of Greymouth. For patriotic and social welfare services.
- Eileen Mary Smith – of Blenheim. For patriotic and social welfare services.
- Tom Smith. For services in organising entertainments for members of the armed forces.
- George Sparry. For services in connection with ship repairs, Auckland.
- Percy Vernon Esmond Stainton JP. For patriotic and social welfare services in the New Plymouth district.
- Edward Albert Stevenson. For services in relation to the war effort.
- Frank Emanuel Sutherland. For services in connection with the national savings campaign.
- Tuoro Tango. For services in connection with Māori patriotic activities at Rotorua.
- Percy Thomson – chairman, Provincial Patriotic Zone Committee, Stratford.
- Olive Thorburn – honorary secretary, Waipukurau Women's War Service Auxiliary.
- Hinehon Tureia – of Gisborne. For patriotic and social, welfare services.
- Hilda Tweedy – of Timaru. For services in connection with the reception and welfare of sick and wounded prisoners of war.
- Flora Amy August Urquhart. For social welfare services on behalf of members of the forces at Papakura Military Camp.
- Fay Vernon, of Christchurch. For services to the Red Cross.
- Mary Karaka Waitioi – of Rotorua. For patriotic and social welfare services.
- Edward George Walkinshaw. For public services during the war.
- Charlotte Eliot Warburton – chairwoman, Palmerston North branch of the Women's War Service Auxiliary.
- Anne Whitaker – of Auckland. For patriotic services during the war, especially in connection with women's movements and the national savings campaign.
- Charles Richardson White – town clerk, Wanganui.
- Clementina Margaret Wilkinson – of Tauranga. For services to the Red Cross and other patriotic organisations.
- Mabel Helen Wilson Wilkinson. For services in connection with women's patriotic organisations in the Eltham district.
- Ada Kathleen Wilson. For services in connection with the Te Kūiti branch of the Women's' War Service Auxiliary.
- Jessie Banks Wilson – of Oamaru. For services in connection with women's war activities.

Military division

- Temporary Acting Lieutenant-Commander Richard Blampied – Royal New Zealand Naval Reserve.
- Cyril Carr – senior master, Royal Navy.
- Mary Eleanor Chesney – third officer, Women's Royal New Zealand Navy Service.
- Lieutenant-Commander Ralph Leslie Cross VD – Royal New Zealand Volunteer Reserve (Retd).
- Temporary Lieutenant Arthur Lovat Fraser DSC – Royal New Zealand Naval Reserve.
- Leslie Samuel George Martin, – temporary warrant engineer, Royal New Zealand Navy.
- Lieutenant-Commander Wybrante Olphert – Royal New Zealand Volunteer Reserve.
- John Norman Richards – temporary warrant writer officer, Royal New Zealand Navy.
- Temporary Lieutenant-Commander Richard Tudor Roberts VD – Royal New Zealand Naval Reserve.
- Temporary Lieutenant William Williamson – Royal New Zealand Volunteer Reserve.
- Captain (temporary) Robert William Borland – New Zealand Military Forces.
- Captain (temporary) (Quartermaster) William Edmonds – New Zealand Military Forces.
- Captain (temporary) Percival Nowall Erridge – New Zealand Military Forces.
- Captain William Charles Francis – New Zealand Military Forces.
- Lieutenant Arthur William Herbert Gally – New Zealand Military Forces.
- Senior Commander Dorothy May Hawkins – New Zealand Women's Army Auxiliary Corps.
- Major Geoffrey Hardurn Heal – New Zealand Military Forces.
- Charge Sister Margaret Hitchcock – New Zealand Army Nursing Service.
- Major (temporary) (Quartermaster) Alan Holmes – New Zealand Military Forces.
- Major (temporary) William James Birss Hunter – New Zealand Military Forces.
- Major Francis John Martin – New Zealand Military Forces.
- Warrant Officer Class I Thomas William Page – New Zealand Military Forces.
- Major (temporary) Robert Harry Perrett – New Zealand Military Forces.
- Major (temporary) (Quartermaster) Hans Christian Frithjof Peterson – New Zealand Military Forces.
- Honorary Captain Charles Pike – New Zealand Military Forces.
- Major Gavin Eugene Pollock – New Zealand Military Forces.
- Captain William Vincent Quane – New Zealand Military Forces.
- Captain (temporary) (Quartermaster) James Laurence Oliphant-Rowe – New Zealand Military Forces.
- Captain Harry Gordon Remshardt Sedgley – New Zealand Military Forces.
- Captain (temporary) (Quartermaster) William Frederick Sellen – New Zealand Military Forces.
- Major Benjamin William Henry Smart – New Zealand Military Forces.
- Captain Eden William Smith – New Zealand Military Forces.
- Captain (Quartermaster) Albert De Bolton Peel Steward MM – New Zealand Military Forces.
- Senior Commander Mary Eulalie Whyte – New Zealand Women's Army Auxiliary Corps.
- Major (temporary) John Albert Worsnop – New Zealand Military Forces.
- Squadron Leader George Frederick Chippendale – Royal New Zealand Air Force.
- Squadron Leader Murray Davy Nairn – Royal New Zealand Air Force.
- Squadron Leader Alwyn Palmer – Royal New Zealand Air Force.
- Squadron Leader Bruce Robert Rae – Royal New Zealand Air Force.
- Acting Squadron Leader Cecil William Franks – Royal New Zealand Air Force.
- Acting Squadron Leader Philip Edward Laughton-Bramley – Royal Air Force Volunteer Reserve.
- Acting Squadron Leader Rawlings William McSkimming – Royal New Zealand Air Force.
- Acting Squadron Leader Maurice Leonard Pirie – Royal New Zealand Air Force.
- Flight Lieutenant John Ronald Day – Royal New Zealand Air Force.
- Flight Lieutenant Maurice Colin Kain – Royal New Zealand Air Force.
- Flight Lieutenant James Douglas Mackay – Royal New Zealand Air Force.
- Acting Flight Lieutenant James Francis Sharkey – Royal New Zealand Air Force.
- Flying Officer Claude Patrick Perrett – Royal New Zealand Air Force.
- Warrant Officer William Arthur Everson – Royal New Zealand Air Force.
- Warrant Officer Rex Bernard Robins – Royal New Zealand Air Force.
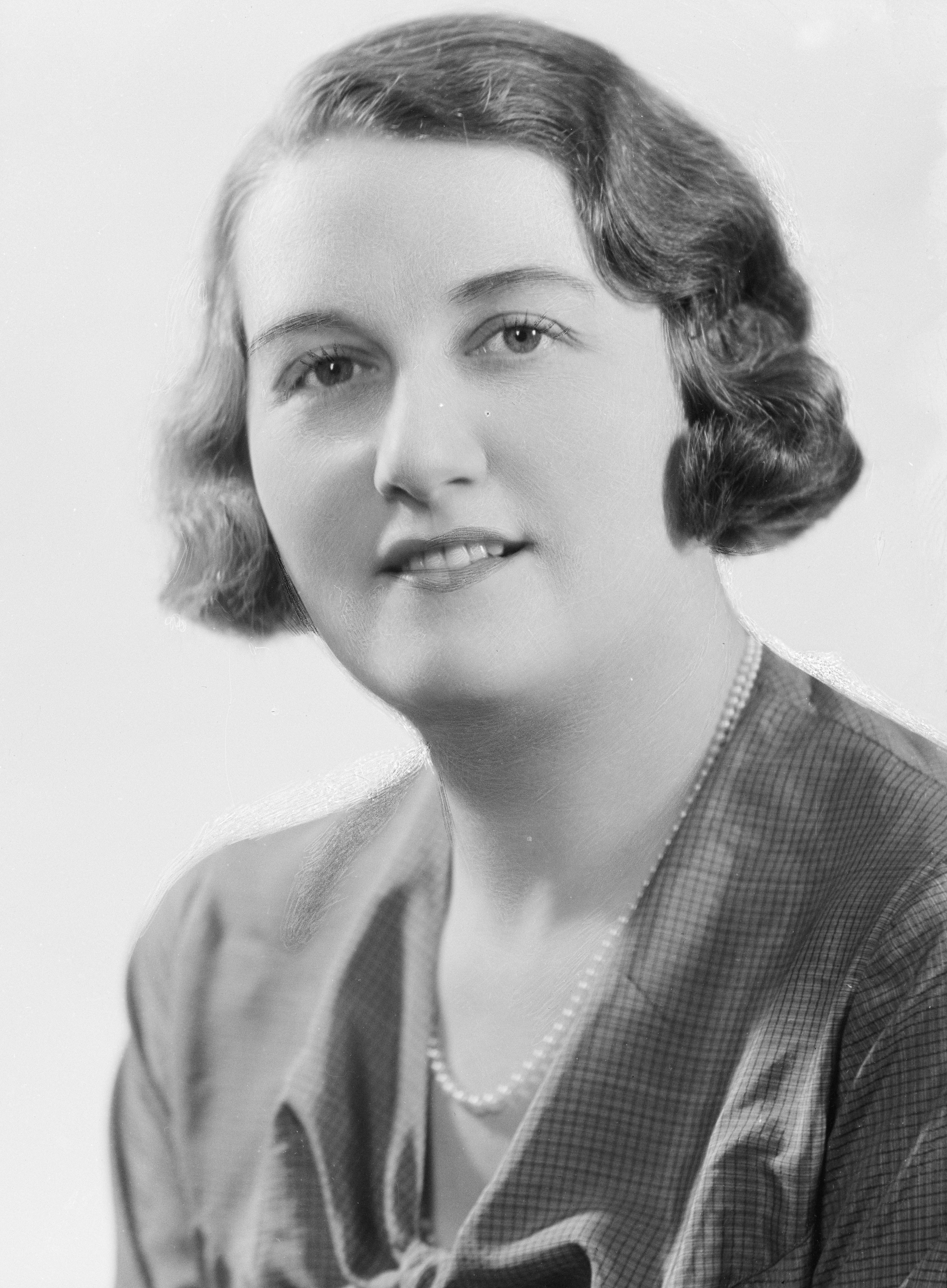
Constance Morice

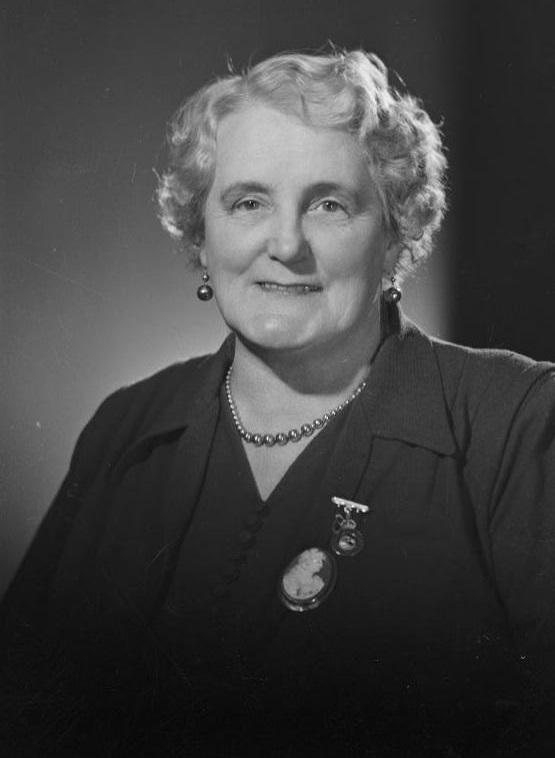
Mary Dreaver

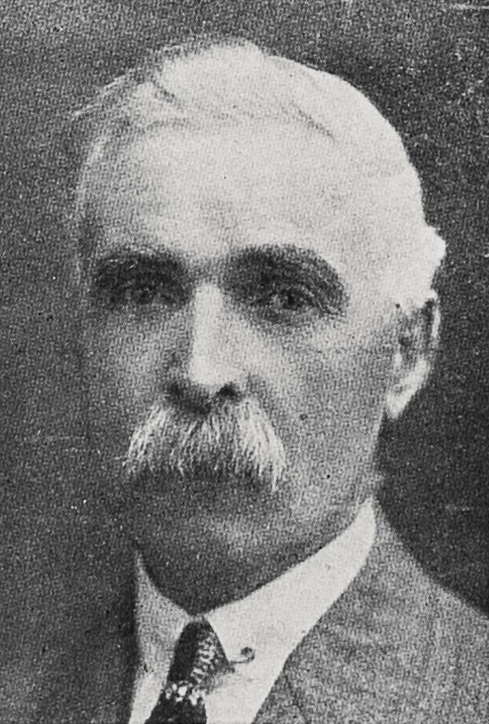
William Jones

== British Empire Medal (BEM) ==
Civil division

- Albert William Andrews – shipwright, naval base, City of Auckland.
- Helena Marian Barnard – of Island Bay. For welfare services.
- George William Conmee – chargeman, Naval Armament Depot, naval base, City of Auckland.
- Nancy Ellaby Cotterill – secretary, Women's Representative Committee, National Patriotic Fund, Gisborne.
- Leone Gertrude de Zoete Coventry – secretary, Gore branch of the Women's War Service Auxiliary.
- Kathaine Mary Deans – of Darfield. For welfare services to the Merchant Navy.
- Catherine Gaw – honorary secretary, Te Aroha branch of the Patriotic Committee.
- Margaret Colleen Groom – of Wellington; assistant to the secretary of the National Patriotic Fund Board.
- Ophir Hallam – member of the Women's War Service Auxiliary, Wanganui.
- Pirihira Heketa – of Wellington. For welfare services.
- Victor Hamilton Humphreys – process worker, Ellerslie.
- William Percy Huggins – in charge of workshop, Radio Development Laboratory, Department of Scientific and Industrial Research.
- Merva Sheldon Jeune – secretary, Fairlie branch of the Women's War Service Auxiliary.
- Isabella Olive Grace Jones – secretary, Putāruru branch of the Women's War Service Auxiliary.
- Eric Donald McRae – foreman of machine shop, Dominion Physical Laboratory, Auckland.
- Eve Winifred Moore – of Auckland. For welfare services.
- Sergeant Albert Edward Naulls – senior orderly, Government House.
- Reginald Henry Nees – head storeman, Radio Development Laboratory, Department of Scientific and Industrial Research.
- John Penfold – of Ruatoria. For welfare services.
- Peter John Hope Purvis – member of the staff of the Governor-General.
- Kai Rewai. For services to the Ngāti Ōtautahi Māori Club, City of Christchurch.
- Gertrude Lucy Stitchbury – of Lowry Bay. For welfare services.
- Hiria Tangaere – of Rangitukia. For welfare services.
- William John Taylor – of Timaru. For welfare services.
- Joyce Alma Warner – chargehand, Ford Factory, Karaka Creek, Thames.
- Kenneth Wells – motorman able seaman, New Zealand Barque Pamir.

Military division

- Chief Petty Officer Leslie James Elliott – Royal New Zealand Volunteer Reserve.
- Temporary Petty Officer Arthur Robert Everitt – Royal New Zealand Navy.
- Leading Signalman Reginald Percy Vincent Hayter – Royal New Zealand Navy.
- Chief Petty Officer Writer Robert Turner Bywater Lutman – Royal New Zealand Navy.
- Acting Leading Seaman Ernest Martin – Royal New Zealand Volunteer Reserve.
- Chief Petty Officer Kennedy Welton Sparke – Royal New Zealand Navy.
- Leading Seaman Walter Thomson – Royal New Zealand Navy.
- Chief Petty Officer Ernest Alfred Tibbenham – Royal New Zealand Navy.
- Staff Sergeant Walter Eric Appleby – New Zealand Military Forces.
- Warrant Officer Class I (temporary) Albert Victor Calder – New Zealand Military Forces.
- Staff Sergeant James Carson – New Zealand Military Forces.
- Staff Sergeant William James Diack – New Zealand Military Forces.
- Warrant Officer Class I (temporary) George Fitzgerald – New Zealand Military Forces.
- Staff Sergeant John Reginald Hay – New Zealand Military Forces.
- Sergeant James Higgins – New Zealand Military Forces.
- Staff Sergeant Joy Higgins – New Zealand Women's Army Auxiliary Corps.
- Sergeant Ambrose Charles Hurdsfield – New Zealand Military Forces.
- Staff Sergeant Horace Haines McCullough – New Zealand Military Forces.
- Sergeant Frederick Augustus Pitt – New Zealand Military Forces.
- Warrant Officer Class I (temporary) Edward Arthur Preston – New Zealand Military Forces.
- Staff Sergeant Matthew Spence – New Zealand Military Forces.
- Staff Sergeant Leslie George Tyrie – New Zealand Military Forces.
- Sergeant Raymond Metton Underwood – New Zealand Military Forces.
- Sergeant (temporary) Robert Hay Watson – New Zealand Dental Corps.
- Acting Warrant Officer Raymond Leonard Woodfield – Royal New Zealand Air Force.
- Flight Sergeant Charles William Cooper – Royal New Zealand Air Force.
- Flijght Sergeant James McArthur Grant – Royal New Zealand Air Force.
- Flight Sergeant John Curtise Henry – Royal New Zealand Air Force.
- Flight Sergeant John Leonard Logan – Royal New Zealand Air Force.
- Flight Sergeant John Errol McNeill – Royal New Zealand Air Force.
- Flight Sergeant George Raymond Patton – Royal New Zealand Air Force.
- Senior Sergeant June Purser – New Zealand Women's Auxiliary Air Force.
- Sergeant (now Warrant Officer) George Noel Dew – Royal New Zealand Air Force.
- Sergeant Percy Thomas Hurn – Royal New Zealand Air Force.
- Corporal Eileen Daisy Owen – New Zealand Women's Auxiliary Air Force.
- Leading Aircraftman Ian Burke – Royal New Zealand Air Force.

== Distinguished Service Cross (DSC) ==
- Commander Andrew Douglas Holden OBE – Royal New Zealand Naval Reserve.
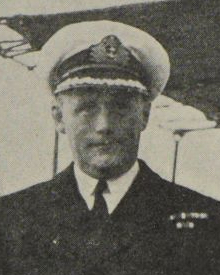
Andrew Holden

== Royal Red Cross ==
=== Associate (ARRC) ===
- Eva Jane Beales (Matron) – British Red Cross Society.
- Charge Sister Jane Kiritapu Nepia – New Zealand Army Nursing Service.

== Air Force Cross (AFC) ==
- Flight Lieutenant Alan Frederick Jacobsen – Royal New Zealand Air Force.
- Squadron Leader Jonas William Henry Lett – Royal New Zealand Air Force.
- Squadron Leader Graham Carrick Martin – Royal New Zealand Air Force.
- Flying Officer Charles Alexander McDonald – Royal New Zealand Air Force.
- Acting Wing Commander Lloyd Hern Parry – Royal New Zealand Air Force.
- Flight Lieutenant Henry Keith Patience – Royal New Zealand Air Force.
- Flight Lieutenant John Herbert Penney – Royal New Zealand Air Force.

== King's Commendation for Valuable Services in the Air ==
- Flight Lieutenant Harold Dale Ellerington – Royal New Zealand Air Force.
- Flight Lieutenant Colin Sydney Marceau DFC – Royal New Zealand Air Force.
- Warrant Officer Kenneth Douglas MacLachlan – Royal New Zealand Air Force.
- Acting Squadron Leader Robert Duncan McVicker – Royal New Zealand Air Force.
- Flight Lieutenant Richard Thomas Mounsey – Royal New Zealand Air Force.
- Flight Lieutenant Leonard Frederick Poore – Royal New Zealand Air Force.
- Flight Lieutenant John Strand – Royal New Zealand Air Force.
- Flying Officer Donald Alfred Williams – Royal New Zealand Air Force.

== Mention in despatches ==
- Temporary Lieutenant (Sp) Bernard Joseph Tonks – Royal New Zealand Naval Volunteer Reserve.
- Petty Officer John White Cameron – Royal New Zealand Navy.
