= Alfred Eady =

New Zealand music retailer

Alfred Eady OBE
- Born: Lewis Alfred Eady; 12 May 1891; Auckland, New Zealand
- Died: 21 April 1965 (aged 73); Remuera, Auckland, New Zealand
- Occupation: Music retailer
- Known for: Company director, broadcaster, benefactor
- Spouse: Agnes Amelia Adams (m. 1917)
- Children: Two
- Relatives: Agnes Wood (daughter)

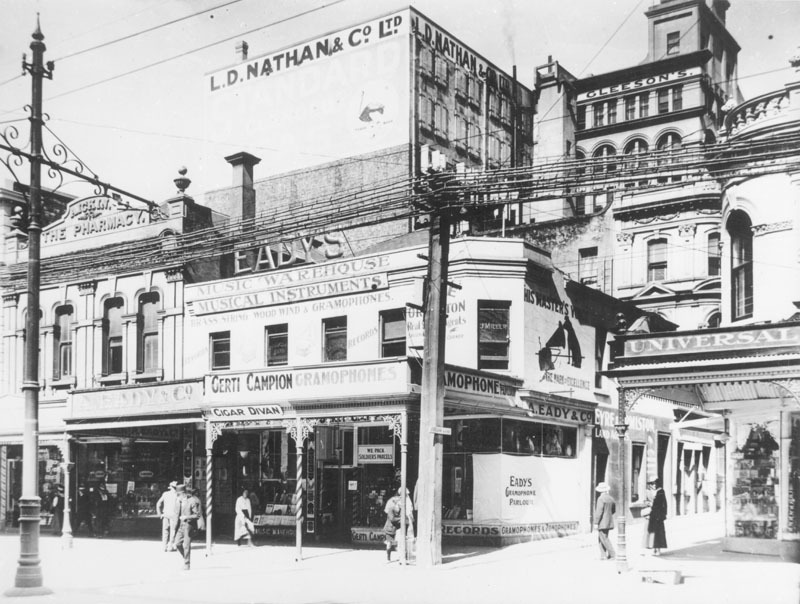

Lewis Alfred Eady OBE (12 May 1891 – 21 April 1965) was a New Zealand music retailer, company director and benefactor.

== Early life ==
Eady was born in Auckland, New Zealand, on 12 May 1891. After leaving school in 1906, he worked for his father, Lewis Roberts Eady, a musician who tuned pianos and traded in second-hand instruments. When the firm moved from Karangahape Road to Queen Street shortly after World War I, Eady became managing director.

On 17 February 1917 at Mount Eden, Auckland, Eady married Agnes Amelia Adams, a teacher.

== Councillor ==
Between 1925 and 1929, Eady was on the Auckland City Council. He was enthusiastic about libraries, and in 1926 he presented Auckland Public Library with a collection of over 600 volumes of music and music literature. He continued to donate until a substantial collection of music material was established.

In the 1956 New Year Honours, Eady was appointed an Officer of the Order of the British Empire, for services to the community in Auckland, especially as a city councillor.

== Business owner ==
In 1928, the firm, now Lewis Eady Limited, moved to a seven-storey building on Queen Street that had a concert chamber, soundproofed audition rooms, and studios and professional chambers for music teachers.

In 1930, the firm established its own radio station, 1ZR, in the Queen Street premises. Pioneer broadcasters included Aunt Daisy, Dudley Wrathall and Rod Talbot. A "radio church", the 'Friendly Road', was run by 'Uncle Tom' Garland and the Reverend Colin Scrimgeour.

== Other activities ==
In 1932, Eady established the first Junior Chamber of Commerce ('Jaycees') in the southern hemisphere, and during the 1940s took leading roles in the Rotary Club of Auckland. He was also active in the Congregational church.

== Later life ==
Eady died at Remuera on 21 April 1965, survived by his wife, son and daughter. He is buried at Purewa Cemetery with his family.
