= William Perry (New Zealand politician) =

New Zealand politician

The Honourable Sir William Perry
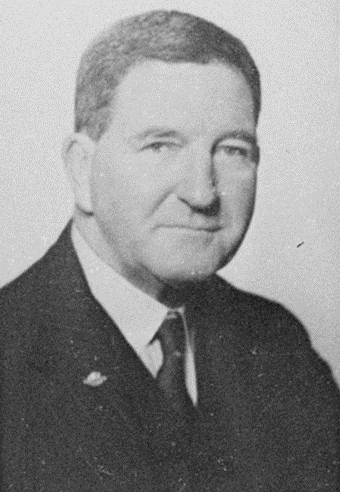

Member of the Legislative Council
- In office 22 June 1934 – 31 December 1950

Personal details
- Born: 23 August 1885 West Coast, New Zealand
- Died: 20 March 1968 (aged 82) Wellington, New Zealand
- Party: United

Sir William Perry (23 August 1885 – 20 March 1968) was a member of the New Zealand Legislative Council.

Perry stood in the Eastbourne Borough by-election that arose from the resignation of Francis Kelly and was successful.

He was appointed to the Legislative Council from 22 June 1934 to 21 June 1941, from 23 June 1941 to 22 June 1948, and from 23 June 1948 to 31 December 1950 when the Council was abolished. He was appointed by the United–Reform Coalition Government, and then by the First Labour Government. He was chairman of the United Party.

He was Deputy Chairman of the War Cabinet from 10 June 1943 to 22 August 1945 (it had been dissolved on 21 August). Sidney Holland had been Deputy Chairman from 30 June 1942 to 2 October 1942, when he resigned.

Perry was president of the Royal New Zealand Returned and Services' Association (RSA) from 1935 to 1943.

Perry lived in Wellington. He was appointed a Knight Bachelor in the 1946 New Year Honours. In 1953, he was awarded the Queen Elizabeth II Coronation Medal. He died in 1968 and was buried at Karori Cemetery.
