= Thomas McCormack (artist) =

New Zealand artist

Thomas Arthur McCormack OBE (27 April 1883 – 26 June 1973) was a New Zealand artist. He was born in Napier, New Zealand, on 27 April 1883.

In 1953, McCormack was awarded the Queen Elizabeth II Coronation Medal. In the 1956 New Year Honours, he was appointed an Officer of the Order of the British Empire, for services as an artist.
