= Doug Ball (school inspector) =

New Zealand teacher (1895–1986)

Douglas George Ball OBE OStJ (19 October 1895 – 8 February 1986) was a New Zealand teacher, school inspector and educational administrator. He was born in Wanganui, New Zealand, on 19 October 1895.

In the 1946 New Year Honours, Ball was appointed an Officer of the Order of the British Empire. In 1953, he was awarded the Queen Elizabeth II Coronation Medal, and in 1957 he was appointed an Officer of the Order of St John.
