= Hector Christie =

New Zealand lawyer, politician and scouting leader

Hector Christie OBE (7 December 1881 – 4 April 1957) was a New Zealand lawyer, local politician and scouting leader. He was born in Wanganui, New Zealand, on 7 December 1881.

In the 1946 New Year Honours, Christie was appointed an Officer of the Order of the British Empire for patriotic and social welfare services in connection with the organisation of the boy scouts movement. In 1953, he was awarded the Queen Elizabeth II Coronation Medal.
