= Francis Kelly (New Zealand politician) =

New Zealand politician (1883–1977)

The Honourable Francis Kelly

Member of the New Zealand Legislative Council
- In office 22 June 1950 – 31 December 1950

Personal details
- Born: Francis Patrick Kelly; 1883 Hastings, New Zealand
- Died: 25 September 1975 (aged 92)
- Party: National Party

Francis Patrick Kelly (1883 – 25 September 1975) was a New Zealand politician. Born in Hastings, he was appointed a member of the suicide squad of the New Zealand Legislative Council in 1950. A solicitor by trade, he first practiced in Wellington and then in Hastings.

== Early life ==
Kelly was born in 1883 in Hastings. His father, John Kelly, was the proprietor of the Hastings Hotel on the corner of Railway Road and Heretaunga Street. He received his education at Heretaunga School (then located in Hastings) and Victoria University of Wellington, from where he graduated with a Bachelor of Laws. He represented his university in hockey and running. He won a Plunket Medal (a debating prize from Victoria University) and, alongside Edward John Fitzgibbon, the Joynt Scroll in 1906 (a nationwide oratory award for university students).

Kelly was a member of the 1st New Zealand Expeditionary Force.

== Professional life ==
Humphrey O'Leary and Kelly both passed their university examinations in November 1909 and, with effect of 1 February 1910, entered into a partnership, calling themselves O'Leary and Kelly.

== Political career ==
In the 1913 local elections, Kelly stood as a borough councillor for the Eastbourne Borough (now part of Lower Hutt). Of 12 candidates for 8 positions, he was the highest-polling contestant. He resigned his seat on the borough council in October 1914 as he was about to move back to Hastings. The resulting by-election was won by William Perry.

Kelly was on the executive of the National Party since 1936, the year the party was founded. He was later a Dominion councillor for the party. He was appointed as a member of the suicide squad nominated by the First National Government on 22 June 1950 to vote for the abolition of the council. Most of the new members (like Kelly) were appointed on 22 June 1950, and served until 31 December 1950 when the council was abolished.

== Private life and death ==
Kelly kept his interest in sport and held various administrative offices for bowling, gold, and racing. When he was first included in the Who's Who in New Zealand in 1951 after his appointment to the Legislative Council, he was listed as living in Market Street, Hastings. By 1954, he was living in Wellington, and the 1956 and 1961 edition of the Who's Who listed him as living at 9 Clifton Terrace, Wellington, which today is covered by the suburb of Kelburn. The 1964, 1968, 1971, and 1978 editions of the Who's Who listed him as living at 700 York Street, Hastings.

Kelly died on 25 September 1975 aged 92 and was buried at Hastings Cemetery, where he shares a plot with his father.
