= 1956 New Year Honours (New Zealand) =

Appointments rewarding good works by New Zealanders

The 1956 New Year Honours in New Zealand were appointments by Elizabeth II on the advice of the New Zealand government to various orders and honours to reward and highlight good works by New Zealanders. The awards celebrated the passing of 1955 and the beginning of 1956, and were announced on 2 January 1956.

The recipients of honours are displayed here as they were styled before their new honour.

== Knight Bachelor ==
- William Walter Mulholland OBE – of Canterbury. For services to farming.
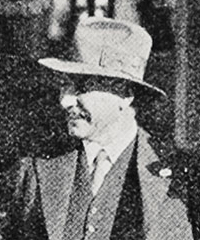
Sir Walter Mulholland

== Order of Saint Michael and Saint George ==
=== Knight Commander (KCMG) ===
- The Honourable Thomas Clifton Webb QC – high commissioner in the United Kingdom, formerly Attorney-General and Minister of External Affairs.
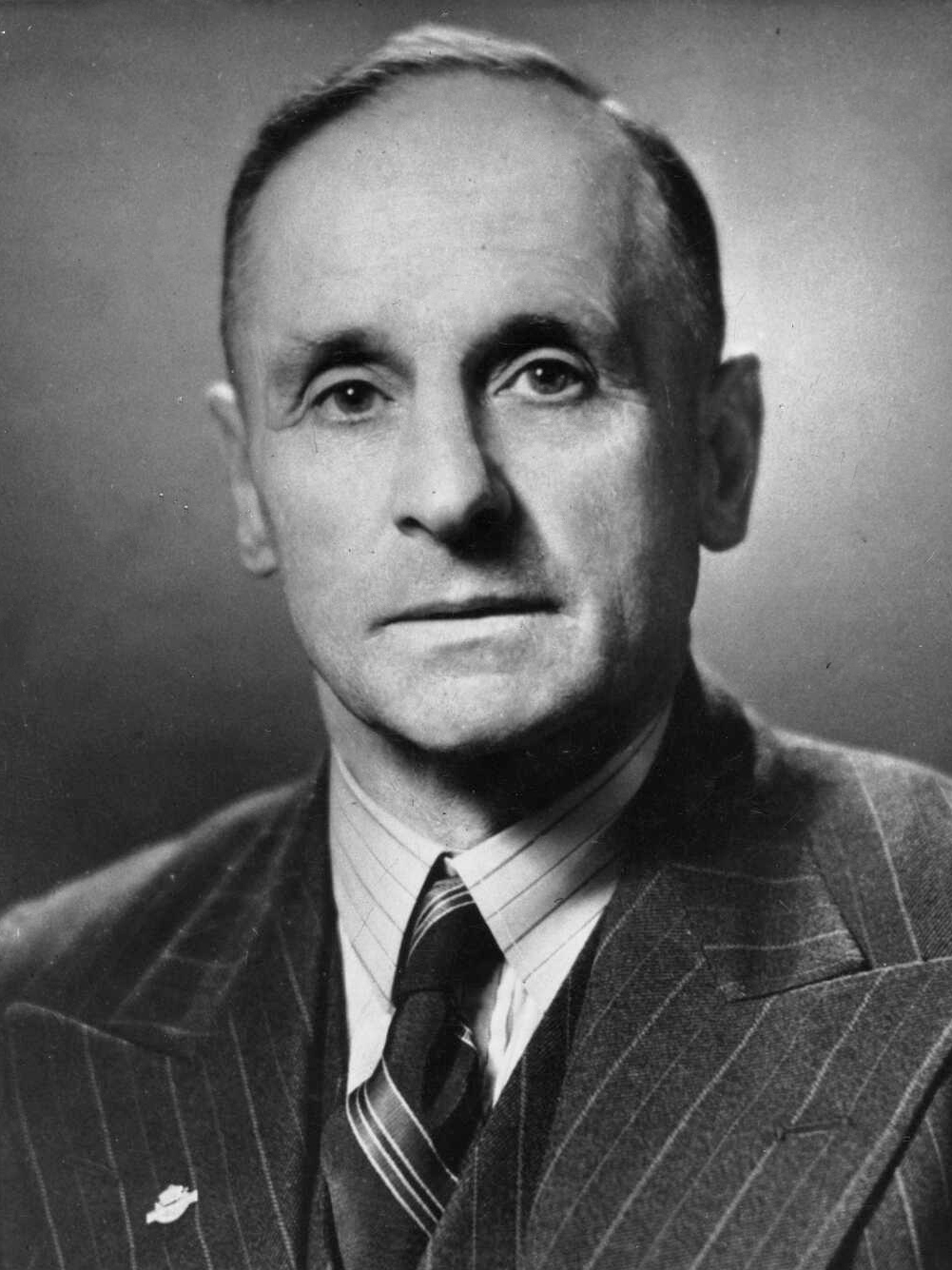
Sir Clifton Webb

=== Companion (CMG) ===
- Charles Phipp Agar JP – of Christchurch. For services to local government and the dairy industry.
- George Douglas Robb MD FRCS – a consulting surgeon, of Auckland.
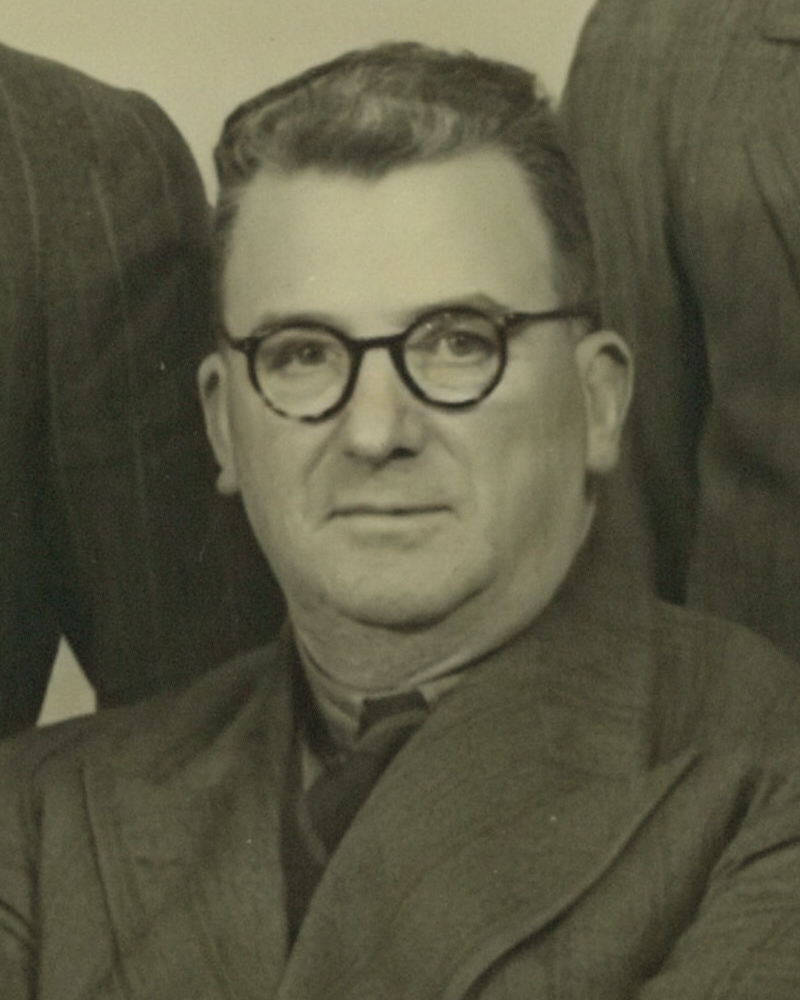
Charles Agar

== Order of the British Empire ==
=== Dame Commander (DBE) ===
Civil division

- The Honourable Grace Hilda Ross – Minister for the Welfare of Women and Children.
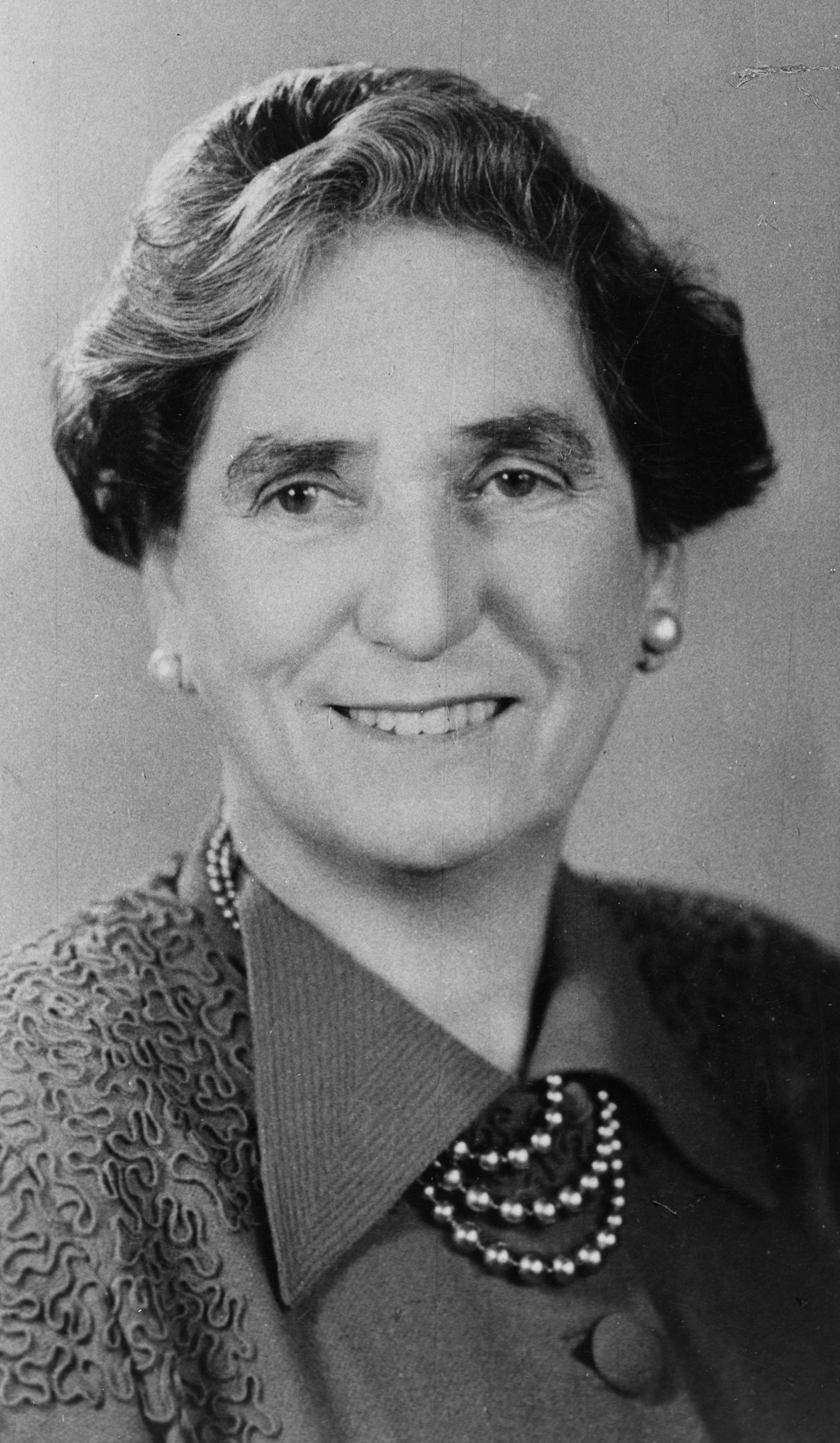
Dame Hilda Ross

=== Commander (CBE) ===
Civil division

- William Percival Evans – professor of chemistry, Canterbury University College.
- David Masson Greig – Director-General of Lands.
- Colonel John Llewellyn Saunders DSO VD BDS – director of Dental Hygiene.
- Henry Devenish Skinner DCM – director of the Otago Museum and lecturer in anthropology at Otago University.

Military division

- Brigadier Monty Claude Fairbrother DSO OBE ED – Royal New Zealand Infantry Corps (Territorial Force).

=== Officer (OBE) ===
Civil division

- Adam Laurence Adamson – mayor of Invercargill.
- Lewis Alfred Eady. For services to the community in Auckland, especially as a city councillor.
- Richard John Burnside Hall MB ChB – medical superintendent, Cook Hospital, Gisborne.
- William Henry Hall – of Timaru. For public services.
- Robert Harding JP – of Hastings. For services to local government.
- Pateriki Joseph Hura – of Taumarunui. For services to the Māori people, especially as a member of the Board of Māori Affairs.
- John Guy Marshall – of Wellington. For services to the manufacturing industry.
- Thomas Arthur McCormack – a prominent artist, of Wellington.
- Peter Munro – assistant commissioner of Police, and a member of the Police Commission.
- Gwendoline Mabel Underwood – formerly a member of the staff of the District Nursing Department.
- The Reverend Canon Henry Williams – of Christchurch. For services to the community.

Military division

- The Venerable Archdeacon Gordon Melville McKenzie VRD – honorary chaplain, Royal New Zealand Naval Volunteer Reserve.
- Lieutenant-Colonel Duncan MacIntyre DSO – Royal New Zealand Armoured Corps (Territorial Force).
- Wing Commander Bruce Roden Furkert – Royal New Zealand Air Force.
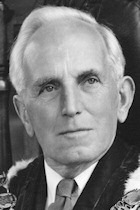
Adam Adamson

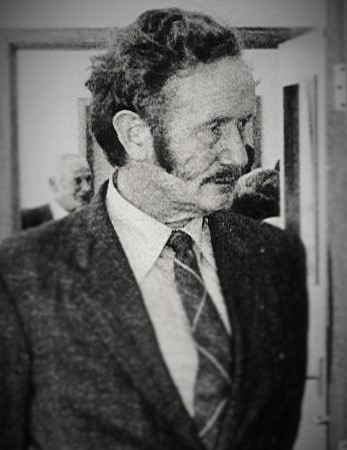
Duncan MacIntyre

=== Member (MBE) ===
Civil division

- John David Allingham – a prominent architect, of Dunedin.
- Archibald Banks. For services in connection with the development of prison farms.
- Maud Ruby Basham. For services in the fields of entertainment and broadcasting.
- Janet Clark Buchanan. For philanthropic services in Taranaki.
- Beatrice Alice Ann Downes – of Te Awamutu. For municipal and social welfare services.
- Oswald Lovell Ferens ED JP – of Dunedin. For services to ex-servicemen.
- Elinor Styles Harvey – formerly matron, Wairoa Hospital.
- Patrick Francis Higgins – chairman, Napier Harbour Board.
- Lucy Atareti Jacob. For services to the Māori people in the Levin and Ōtaki districts.
- James Mercer. For services to sport, particularly lawn tennis.
- William Parsonage. For services to the coal-mining industry.
- Alfred Henry Pettitt – of Dunedin. For services to the community as a musician.
- Charles Bradlaugh Ross – conductor of the Hokitika Municipal Band for 40 years.
- Dorothy Snell – of Whangārei. For social welfare services.
- Ray Watts – of Christchurch. For social welfare services.
- Edmund David White – chairman, Matamata County Council.
- Catherine Maxwell Williams JP – of Auckland. For social welfare services.

Military division

- Lieutenant-Commander Thomas Alexander Simpson – Royal New Zealand Navy.
- Captain Hamish Coates Neale – Royal New Zealand Army Medical Corps (Territorial Force).
- Major Leslie Arthur Pearce – New Zealand Regiment (Regular Force).
- Major (temporary) Stanley Melvin Pritchard – Royal New Zealand Infantry Corps (Territorial Force).
- Flight Lieutenant Noel Herbert Scott – Air Training Corps, Royal New Zealand Air Force.
- Warrant Officer Stephen Raymond Hooker – Royal New Zealand Air Force.
- Warrant Officer Herman Andrew Payne – Royal New Zealand Air Force.
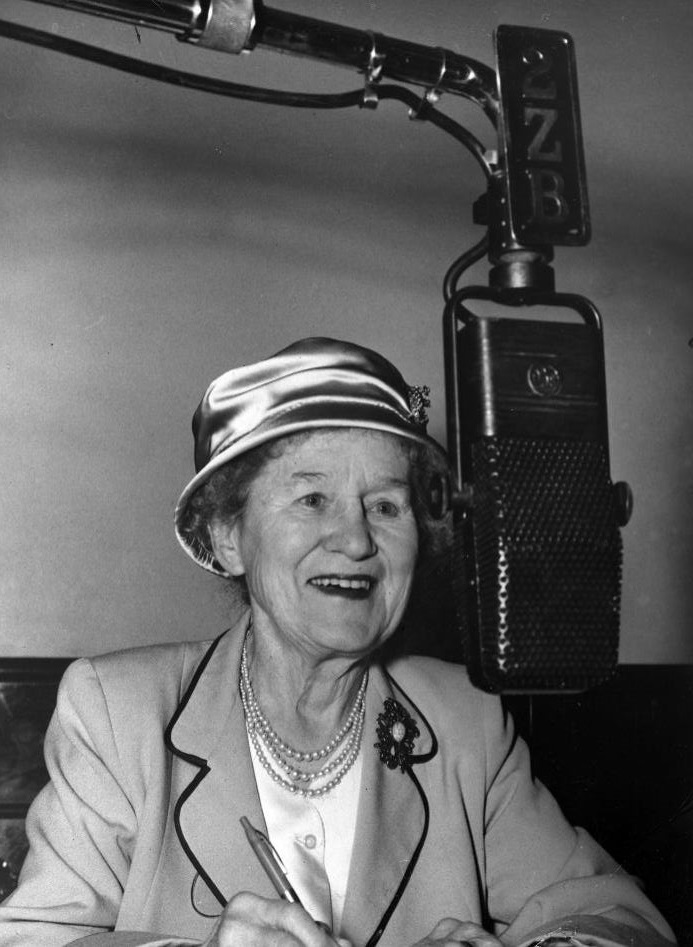
Daisy Basham

== British Empire Medal (BEM) ==
Military division

- Chief Petty Officer John Willis Barnes – Royal New Zealand Navy.
- Chief Petty Officer John Curtis Harman – Royal New Zealand Navy.
- Chief Shipwright Artificer John Norman Jones – Royal New Zealand Navy.
- Chief Yeoman of Signals Henry Richard Moon – Royal New Zealand Navy.
- Staff-Sergeant Peter King Christian – Royal New Zealand Armoured Corps (Regular Force).
- Sergeant James Dixon – Royal New Zealand Army Service Corps (Regular Force).
- Flight Sergeant Eric William Metcalf – Royal New Zealand Air Force.
- Sergeant John William Noble – Royal New Zealand Air Force.
