= William Percival Evans =

New Zealand academic (1864–1959)

William Percival Evans CBE
- Born: 22 November 1864; Melbourne, Australia
- Died: 2 September 1959 (aged 94)
- Education: Canterbury University College; University of Giessen
- Spouse: Christiana Mayo Kebbell (m. 1893)
- Awards: Hector Medal (1931); Commander of the Order of the British Empire (1956)
- Scientific career
- Fields: Chemistry and structure of New Zealand lignite
- Workplaces: Canterbury University College

William Percival Evans CBE (22 November 1864 – 2 September 1959) was a New Zealand chemist who specialised in the study of local brown coals.

== Biography ==
Born in Melbourne, Australia to an English vicar, Evans moved to New Zealand with his family and they settled at Wakefield, south of Nelson. He was educated at Nelson College from 1876 to 1880, and then studied chemistry and mathematics at Canterbury University College, from where he graduated MA with first class honours in 1885. He completed a PhD in chemistry at the University of Giessen in Germany.

Evans was a school teacher at Christ's College from 1892 to 1902 and in 1901 was appointed as a lecturer in chemistry and physics at Canterbury University College, rising to the rank of professor of chemistry. During his time there he was instrumental in preventing women from studying advanced chemistry. Jean Struthers, who studied botany instead, recalled that she was prevented from enrolling for chemistry because Evans "did not consider it a suitable subject for girls: there was too much standing, it was too strenuous, and [she] would have been the only girl. In addition, there was only one toilet in the Department."

He established a research group to investigate New Zealand lignite. He retired as professor emeritus in 1922 and moved to Wellington.

Following his retirement, Evans remained active as a scientist and administrator, serving on the senate of the University of New Zealand from 1931 to 1945. Elected a Fellow of the Royal Society of New Zealand in 1930, he was awarded the society's Hector Medal in 1931 and served as president from 1937 to 1938. He was the foundation president of the New Zealand Institute of Chemistry, and was elected as that body's first honorary fellow in 1944. He was appointed a Commander of the Order of the British Empire in the 1956 New Year Honours.

Evans married Christiana Mayo Kebbell in Wellington on 28 December 1893. He died in 1959 and his ashes were buried in Karori Cemetery.
