= John Balmain Brooke =

New Zealand teacher, yacht designer (1907–1992)

John Balmain Brooke OBE (28 July 1907 – 6 August 1992) was a New Zealand teacher, yacht designer and manufacturer, mechanical engineer, engineering administrator. He was born in Auckland, New Zealand, on 28 July 1907.

In the 1946 New Year Honours, Brooke was appointed an Officer of the Order of the British Empire for services in connection with the production of munitions.
