= Agnes Wood =

New Zealand artist and writer

- Born: Agnes Rosetta Eady; 26 May 1921
- Died: 12 December 2013 (aged 92); Auckland, New Zealand
- Education: Elam School of Fine Arts
- Spouse: Edward Phillip Wood (m. 1944; died 1986)
- Relatives: Alfred Eady (father)

Agnes Rosetta Wood (née Eady, 26 May 1921 – 12 December 2013) was a New Zealand artist and writer. She is known for her research and writing on the life of fellow New Zealand artist Colin McCahon.

== Early life and family ==
Born Agnes Rosetta Eady on 26 May 1921, Wood was the daughter of Lewis Alfred Eady, a music retailer, and Agnes Amelia Eady (née Adams). On 2 December 1944, she married Edward Phillip Wood at the Congregational Church in Beresford Street, Auckland.

== Career ==
Wood initially trained and worked as a milliner but later studied at the Elam School of Fine Arts in Auckland, graduating with a master's degree in 1973, aged 52. As a student there she was influenced by her tutors Robert Ellis and Colin McCahon, and her early work explored the structures and patterns of cityscapes. Her figurative paintings, which often depict geometrical portraits on abstract backgrounds, frequently feature figures wearing hats, headpieces or simplified floral headbands — a probable result of her previous training in millinery.

In 1997, Wood published Colin McCahon: The Man and the Teacher, which was based on correspondence and interviews with McCahon.

In 2009, an 88th birthday exhibition of Wood's work was held in Auckland. Paintings by Wood are held in the collections of Auckland Art Gallery Toi o Tāmaki and the University of Auckland.

== Death ==
Wood died in Auckland on 12 December 2013, and her body was cremated at Purewa Crematorium.
