= Walter Mulholland =

New Zealand farmer, union leader (1887–1971)

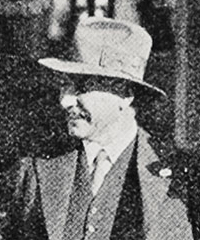
Mulholland in 1936

Sir William Walter Mulholland OBE (8 January 1887 – 9 November 1971) was a notable New Zealand farmer and farmers' union leader. He was born in Greendale, New Zealand.

Mullholland was appointed an Officer of the Order of the British Empire, for services as the president of the Farmers' Union, in the 1946 New Year Honours. In the 1956 New Year Honours, he was appointed a Knight Bachelor, for services to farming.
