= John Saunders (dentist) =

New Zealand dentist and public health administrator (1891–1961)

John Llewellyn Saunders CBE DSO VD (1891–1961) was a notable New Zealand dentist and public health administrator. He was born in Dunedin, New Zealand, in 1891.

In 1953, Saunders was awarded the Queen Elizabeth II Coronation Medal. In the 1956 New Year Honours, he was appointed a Commander of the Order of the British Empire.
