= Agnes Gilmour Kent-Johnston =

Community leader, broadcaster (1893–1981)

Agnes Gilmour Kent-Johnston MBE (27 September 1893 – 10 March 1981) was a New Zealand community leader and broadcaster. She was born in Killearn, Stirlingshire, Scotland, on 27 September 1893. She was appointed a Member of the Order of the British Empire in the 1946 New Year Honours.
