= Colin Scrimgeour =

New Zealand politician (1903–1987)

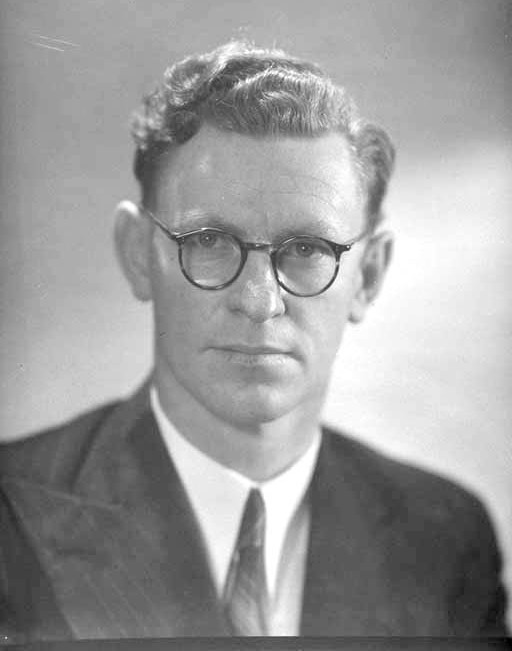
- Scrimgeour in the 1930s
- Born: Colin Graham Scrimgeour; 30 January 1903; Wairoa, Hawke's Bay, New Zealand
- Died: 16 January 1987 (aged 83)
- Citizenship: Australia
- Occupations: Minister, radio and television broadcaster, theatre co-founder
- Awards: King George VI Coronation Medal, Chinese Star of Friendship

The Reverend Colin Graham Scrimgeour (30 January 1903 – 16 January 1987), also known as Uncle Scrim or Scrim, was a New Zealand Methodist Minister and broadcaster.

== Life and ministry ==
Born in Wairoa, Hawke's Bay, he entered the Methodist Ministry in 1923 and concentrated on social work. He was Auckland Methodist City Missioner for six years. After broadcasting from Radio Station 1ZR, run by the firm of Lewis Eady, he established the Friendly Road Broadcasting Station 1ZB in 1933, associated with the Friendly Road church (Aunt Daisy broadcast on these stations, and they supported the Labour Party). Shortly before the 1935 election on Sunday 24 November, an address by Uncle Scrim was expected to urge listeners to vote Labour but was jammed by the Post Office. The minister in charge of the P&T Department, Adam Hamilton, was blamed although he denied responsibility.

As a close friend of Michael Joseph Savage and John A. Lee of the First Labour Government which came to power in 1935, Scrimgeour became Controller of the government-run National Commercial Broadcasting Service.

Peter Fraser, an enemy of Scrimgeour, succeeded Savage as Prime Minister after the latter's death in 1940. In the 1943 elections, Scrimgeour stood against Fraser in Wellington Central as an independent candidate. He performed so well that Fraser (hitherto expected to win his seat comfortably) "only sneaked back on a minority vote".

== Entertainment – radio and television career ==
Scrimgeour was suspended and then sacked in 1943. He moved to Australia, and worked in radio and television there, helping establish the Mercury Theatre in Sydney, New South Wales with Peter Finch. He also worked for a time in (Communist) China before he retired to New Zealand in 1968.

== Awards ==
Scrimgeour was awarded the King George VI Coronation Medal in 1937 and the Chinese Star of Friendship (NZ Roll of Honour, p. 949).

== Legacy ==
Mervyn Thompson wrote a 1976 "song play" about the Great Depression, Songs to Uncle Scrim.

== See also ==
- Radio in New Zealand
