= James Mackay (rugby union) =

James Mackay MBE
- Born: James Douglas Mackay; 21 September 1905 Stratford, New Zealand
- Died: 23 December 1985 (aged 80) Christchurch, New Zealand
- School: New Plymouth Boys' High School
- University: Victoria University College
- Occupation: Educator

Rugby union career
- Position: Wing
Provincial / State sides
| Years | Team | Apps | (Points) |
| 1926, 1928–31 | Wellington | | |
International career
| Years | Team | Apps | (Points) |
| 1929, 1931 | NZ Universities | | |
| 1928 | New Zealand | 0 | (0) |

James Douglas Mackay MBE (21 September 1905 – 23 December 1985) was a New Zealand rugby union player. A wing three-quarter, Mackay represented Wellington at a provincial level, and was a member of the New Zealand national side, the All Blacks, in 1928. He played two matches for the All Blacks, scoring four tries, but did not appear in any internationals.

Mackay studied at Victoria University College, graduating with a Bachelor of Arts in 1929 and a Bachelor of Science in 1933. During World War II he served with the Royal New Zealand Air Force (RNZAF) as an education officer. In October 1940 he was granted an honorary commission with the rank of flight lieutenant in the Administrative and Special Duties Branch of the RNZAF. In April 1942 he relinquished his honorary commission and was granted a temporary commission with the rank of flying officer, fourth year, acting flight lieutenant, and then flight lieutenant (temporary). In the 1946 New Year Honours Mackay was appointed a Member of the Military Division of the Order of the British Empire.

After his playing days, Mackay remained involved in rugby as a coach, selector and administrator. He was coach of the Victoria University first team from 1931, to 1935, the RNZAF team at Wigram from 1938 to 1942 and the Canterbury Agricultural College team from 1947 to 1952. He was an RNZAF selector between 1942 and 1944, a Canterbury and New Zealand Services selector in 1944, and a New Zealand Universities selector in 1947. He served as president of the Ellesmere sub-union in Canterbury from 1953 to 1954.
