= Jean Struthers =

(1899–2002) New Zealand botanist and chemistry teacher

- Born: Jean Boag Cunningham; 7 May 1899; Brookside (near Leeston)
- Died: 12 February 2002 (aged 102)
- Education: Canterbury University College
- Spouse: John Struthers
- Scientific career
- Fields: botany, chemistry, education
- Workplaces: Timaru Girls' High School, Twickenham Girls' Grammar School
- Thesis: A Critical Study of the New Zealand Species of the Genus Cordyline and Anatomical and Ecological Notes on Cordyline australis. (1922)

Jean Boag Struthers (7 May 1899 – 12 February 2002), née Cunningham, was a botany student in New Zealand and an inspirational chemistry teacher in England and New Zealand.

== Early life and education ==
Struthers was born on 7 May 1899 in Brookside, Canterbury, to John and Margaret Clunie Cunningham. She attended Brookside Primary School, and Christchurch Girls' High School, where she received little science education apart from home science, which she considered a "hotch-potch". Struthers enrolled at Canterbury University College in 1918, and graduated in 1921 with a BA. However her "heart was in science". She won prizes for chemistry and botany, but was not allowed to enter advanced chemistry. Professor William Percival Evans didn't believe that chemistry was suitable for women: there was "too much standing, it was too strenuous, and Jean would have been the only girl. In addition, there was only one toilet in the Department."

Struthers instead enrolled in the biology department under the more accepting Professor Charles Chilton, and in 1922 earned an MA with First Class Honours in botany with a dissertation A Critical Study of the New Zealand Species of the Genus Cordyline and Anatomical and Ecological Notes on Cordyline australis.

== Teaching career ==
Struthers taught at Timaru Girls' High School, and then traveled to England in 1931.

On 16 June 1931 in Cambridge (England), she married John Struthers, who had taught at Christchurch Boys' High School. John Struthers was studying mathematics at Cambridge, after which it seems the couple may have intended to return to New Zealand. However the Struthers stayed in England for another 33 years, with Jean Struthers becoming Head of the Chemistry Department at Twickenham Girls' Grammar School. On returning to New Zealand in 1963, Struthers taught chemistry through the Correspondence School, teaching some students who went on to become leaders in the field. One past student, Jilly Evans, who was head of the biochemistry division of Merck Sharp and Dohme, tracked Struthers down to thank her for her inspirational teaching through the Correspondence School. Evans said "One of the things I remember most about Mrs Struthers is her passion for what she taught. She loved chemistry and she passed that love on to me." Struthers said meeting her former student after all these years was wonderful, "It has not made my day -- I would say it has made my life."

Struthers retired from Correspondence School teaching around 1972. She died on 12 February 2002 in New Zealand.

== Legacy ==
Evans was instrumental in arranging for Merck, Sharp and Dohme and the Correspondence School to name one of the school's annual science camps the Jean Struthers Science Camp.

In 2017, Struthers was selected as one of the Royal Society Te Apārangi's 150 women in 150 words.

== Selected works ==
- Jean Struthers (1922). A Critical Study of the New Zealand Species of the Genus Cordyline and Anatomical and Ecological Notes on Cordyline australis (Thesis). University of Canterbury. Wikidata Q104857332.
