= Mary Ann Ellen =

New Zealand rural women's advocate (1897–1949)

Mary Ann Ellen (18 June 1897 – 19 August 1949) was a New Zealand rural women's advocate, community leader and hairdresser. She was born in Glasgow, Lanarkshire, Scotland on 18 June 1897.
