= Aunt Daisy =

New Zealand broadcaster (1879–1963)

Daisy Basham MBE
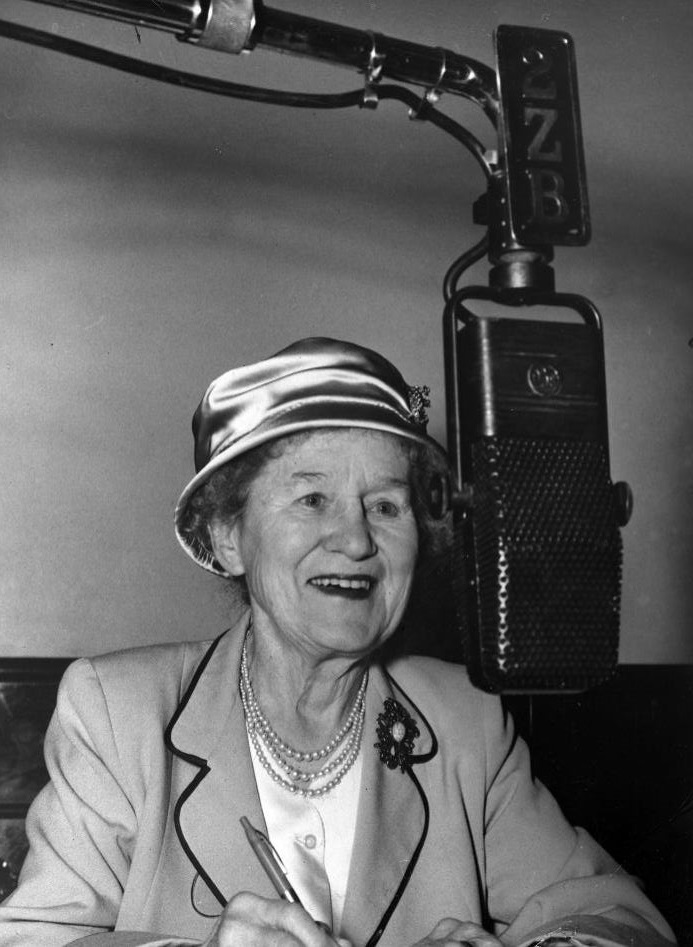
- Aunt Daisy in 1959
- Born: Maud Ruby Taylor; 30 August 1879; London, England
- Died: 14 July 1963 (aged 83); Wellington, New Zealand
- Occupation: Radio broadcaster
- Spouse: Frederick Basham (m. 1904; died 1950)

Maud Ruby Basham MBE (née Taylor; 30 August 1879 – 14 July 1963), usually known as Daisy Basham or professionally as Aunt Daisy, was a New Zealand radio broadcaster from 1930 to 1963. Her various nicknames included "New Zealand's First Lady of the Radio", "Everybody's Aunt" and "The Mighty Atom" due to her 'radio activity' but also a comment on her small stature.

== Early life ==
She was born in London, England, to Robert and Eliza Taylor. Her father died shortly after she was born and her mother soon emigrated to New Plymouth in 1891. She went to Central School and New Plymouth High School, and was active in a choir, concerts, play performances and debating contests. At 16 she began a four year teachers training course at Central School and also teaching at South Road School, New Plymouth. She married Frederick Basham in 1904, and they had three children. Her husband worked as an engineer in New Plymouth but lost his job during the depression. His unemployment led to Daisy seeking work to support their family.

== Career ==
Daisy's first radio work was for the 1YA station in Auckland through singing engagements. This expanded during the 1920s as Daisy broadcast programmes on the lives of composers illustrated with song. In 1929 she became a full-time announcer on the 2YA station initially to "fill up Wednesdays" as the station previously had not broadcast on these days. In 1931 she was fired when 2YA became nationalised and public service rules decreed only one woman was allowed to be employed at each station in an attempt to provide more work for men. Daisy moved to a smaller private station 2ZW. Daisy continued to shift stations as more became nationalised and she and other staffers moved to private stations.

In 1933 Daisy began work at the private "Friendly Road" station 1ZB in Auckland run by Colin Scrimgeour (Uncle Scrim). When the government nationalised broadcasting and set up the National Commercial Broadcasting Service in 1936, she moved to the new network, eventually moving to Wellington. Her 30 minute daily morning show ran from 1933 to 1963. Her role was primarily to promote sponsors' products by interspersing anecdotes and recommendations into a free-form, fast-flowing patter, a predecessor of the modern infomercial. Audiences believed she would never recommend products she did not personally endorse and a deep rapport was established with her (largely female) listeners. As well as cheery product promotions she read homilies and gave advice (such as a piece about marriage in this programme from 1950). She also answered letters with listeners' problems, and is credited with helping to boost morale during World War II. She was renowned as a very fast talker, averaged 202 words a minute during her shows which opened to the song 'Daisy Bell' and the greeting "Good Morning, Good Morning, Good Morning everybody".

Owing to her popularity, the government sent Daisy to Navy, Air Force and Army bases to visit women stationed there and report back on them in her radio show. This was part of New Zealand government propaganda efforts during World War II. In 1944 Daisy went to the United States to promote New Zealand. She was invited to a tea with the first lady, Eleanor Roosevelt, where she passed on messages from the American troops and nurses stationed in New Zealand. She continued to record morning shows informing New Zealanders of what she encountered in the United States. The results of her American tour were published in Aunt Daisy and Uncle Sam.

In 1946 Daisy returned to the United States to deliver a lecture series which extended to include Canada. She spoke on New Zealand's landscapes and wildlife and advocated for the appreciation of nature.

In the 1956 New Year Honours, she was appointed a Member of the Order of the British Empire, for services in the fields of entertainment and broadcasting.

A recipe book, "The Aunt Daisy Cookbook with Household Hints", was a natural result of the popularity of her show, edited by her daughter Barbara Basham. It ran to several editions. Seven others of her cookery books were also published. The cookbook was reprinted in 1977, edited by Barbara Basham and published by Hodder and Stoughton. 2010 saw the 22nd reprint of the book, almost 50 years after Aunt Daisy's death.

In 1963, Aunt Daisy died at the age of 83 years. She was still broadcasting up to a few days beforehand.

== See also ==
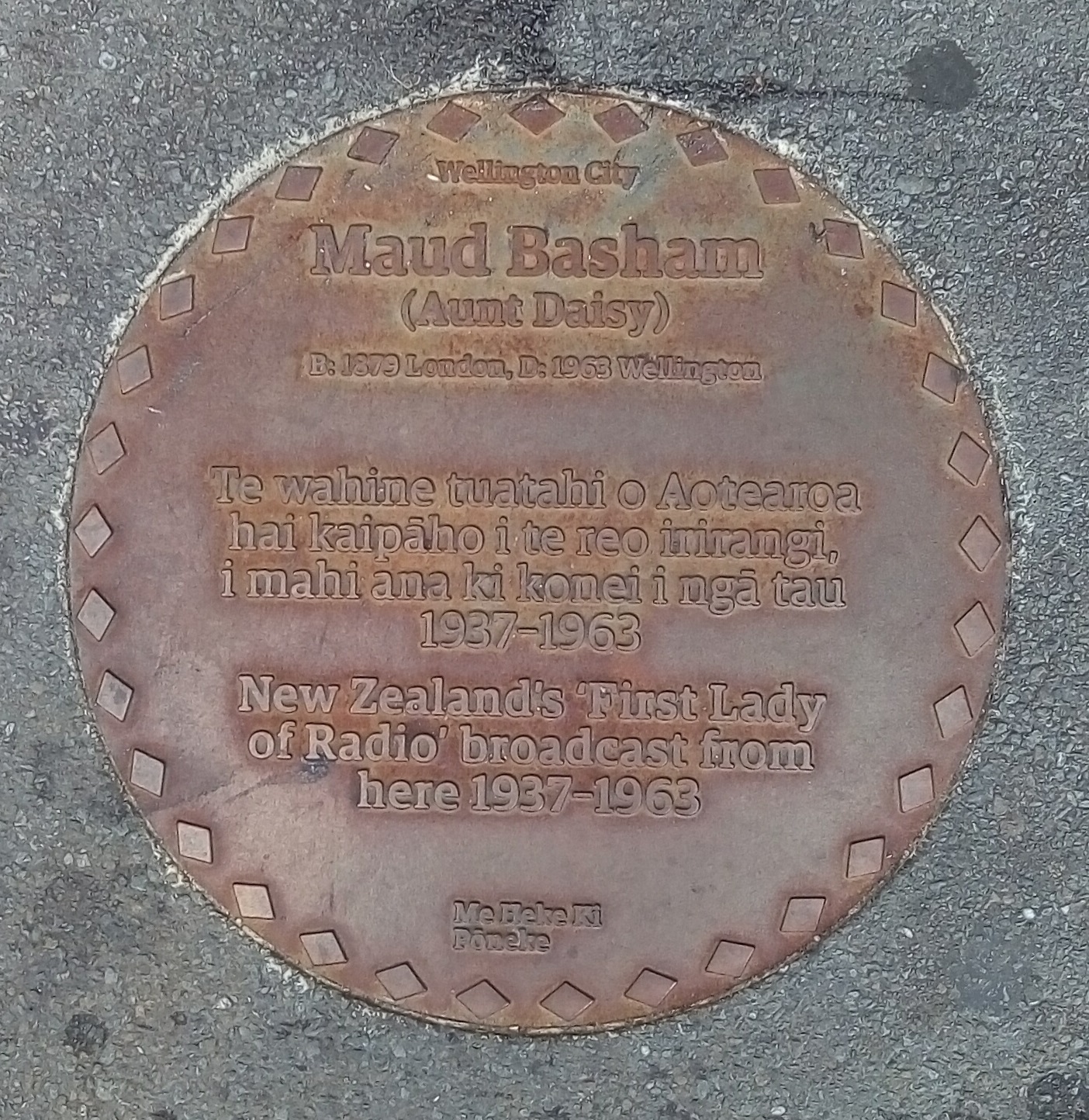
Plaque commemorating Aunt Daisy on Dixon Street, Wellington

- Radio in New Zealand
