= Charlotte Eliot Warburton =

New Zealand community leader and matron

Charlotte Eliot Warburton (1883–1961) was a notable New Zealand community leader and matron. She was born in Palmerston North, Manawatu/Horowhenua, New Zealand in 1883.
