= Royal New Zealand Nursing Corps =

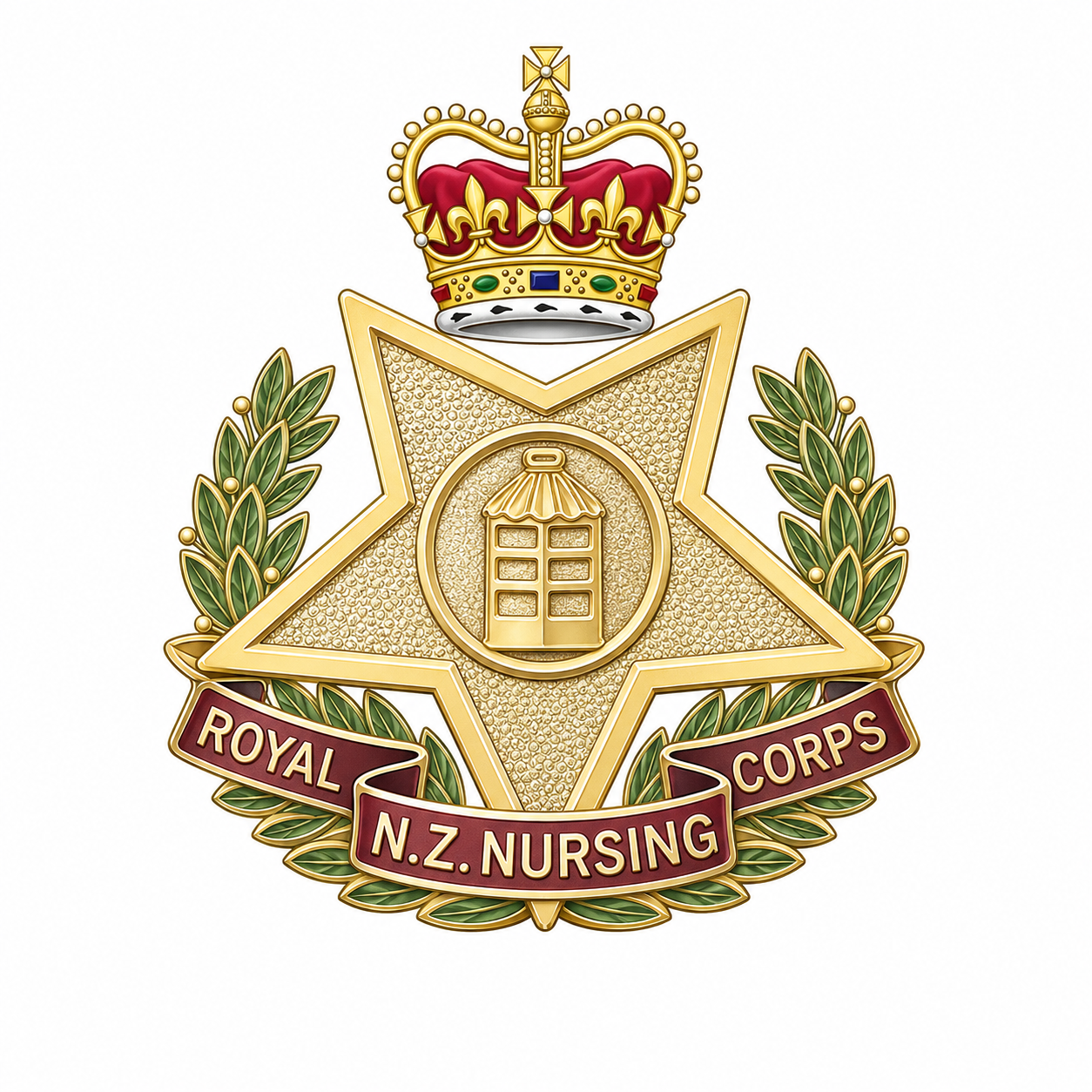
- Cap badge of the Royal New Zealand Nursing Corps
- Active: 1915–present
- Country: New Zealand
- Branch: New Zealand Army
- Role: Medical support

Commanders
- Colonel-in-Chief: Anne, Princess Royal

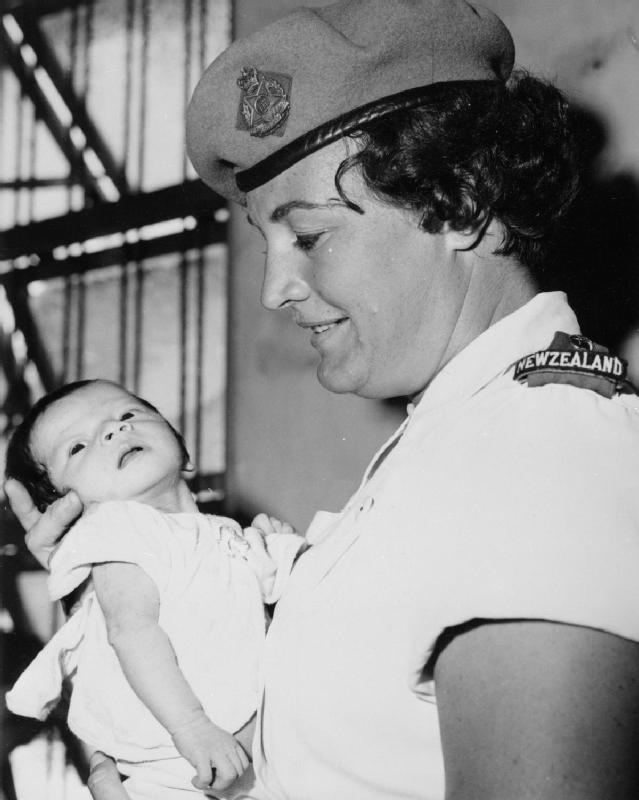
A Royal New Zealand Nursing Corps member at Vung Tau orphanage, in 1971, during the Vietnam War

The Royal New Zealand Nursing Corps (RNZNC) is a corps of the New Zealand Army. The corps was initially formed in 1915 from civilian nurses who volunteered for service during World War I, and who were granted honorary officer ranks. A Nursing Reserve had been formed as part of the New Zealand Medical Corps on 14 May 1908. Today, the corps is an officer-only corps that consists of commissioned officers who are employed for their specialist skills and knowledge as registered nurses, the corps works in conjunction with the Royal New Zealand Army Medical Corps and the Royal New Zealand Dental Corps to promote "health and disease prevention" and to provide "care for the wounded and sick". Nursing Officers in the New Zealand Army can be employed broadly in primary health, perioperative, surgical or emergency settings, which can see RNZNC personnel providing health services in a garrison health centre, in a civilian practice, or deployed on operations.

Up until 1945, the corps was a part-time only formation with personnel being called up for full time service during times of war only. However, since then the RNZNC has developed into a corps of both Regular and Reserve personnel. Throughout the corps' history, personnel have been deployed to various operational theatres. Aside from service during World War I and World War II, the corps has deployed personnel support to operations during the Vietnam War, and more recently to peacekeeping operations such as those in Bosnia and Somalia in the 1990s, the 1991 Gulf War, the East Timor intervention, Bougainville, Iraq and Afghanistan.

== South African (Boer) War ==
New Zealand nurses served overseas during the South African War of 1899–1902, several years before the establishment of the New Zealand Army Nursing Service. Although New Zealand sent more than 6,500 troops to South Africa, nurses were not initially organised as part of a formal New Zealand military nursing service.

New Zealand nurses volunteered for service soon after the outbreak of the war. The British authorities stipulated that nurses sent from New Zealand had to be hospital-trained. The New Zealand government officially sent 13 nurses, although it paid the travel costs of only six. Nurses from Otago and Southland were supported by public fundraising, while other New Zealand nurses already in Britain or travelling independently joined the British Army Nursing Service Reserve.

The first group of New Zealand nurses left for South Africa in early 1900. Four nurses from Christchurch Public Hospital—Gertrude Littlecott, Emily Peter, Grace Webster and Annie Hiatt—served at No. 4 General Hospital at Mooi River in Natal. Nurses worked in difficult field-hospital conditions and treated both battle casualties and the large numbers of soldiers suffering from disease.

The exact number of New Zealand nurses who served in South Africa is uncertain because surviving service records are incomplete. Contemporary historical assessments place the number at approximately 30 to 35. None of the New Zealand nurses is known to have died while serving in South Africa, although several became ill.

New Zealand nurses serving with the Army Nursing Service Reserve wore a fern leaf above the red cross on their armbands to distinguish them from nurses of other nationalities. Unlike British nurses, the New Zealand women did not initially receive the gratuity awarded at the completion of their service. Following repeated appeals, they were granted the £37 10s payment in 1903.

Service in South Africa provided some New Zealand nurses with their first experience of military nursing overseas. Several later served during the First World War, including Emily Peter, who subsequently travelled to Europe and nursed with the Red Cross in Serbia. The experience of New Zealand nurses in the South African War preceded the formal establishment of the New Zealand Army Nursing Service in 1915.

== Establishment of a nursing reserve ==
In 1907, Princess Christian, president of the British Army Nursing Service Reserve, encouraged the establishment of a New Zealand branch. Former South African War nurse Janet Speed, later Janet Gillies, supported the proposal and offered to serve as matron-in-chief. On 14 May 1908 the New Zealand Medical Corps Nursing Reserve was gazetted as part of the reorganisation of New Zealand's military medical services.

The reserve was intended to provide qualified nurses for military hospitals during hostilities. Members were required to be registered nurses and, once enrolled, were regarded as part of New Zealand's military forces when called for service. The reserve was organised into the classifications of matron-in-chief, matrons, sisters and staff nurses.

Gillies was appointed matron-in-chief in August 1908 but encountered difficulty obtaining funding and authority to recruit and organise the reserve. She resigned in 1910. Hester Maclean, assistant inspector of hospitals, subsequently became matron-in-chief and continued efforts to develop a military nursing organisation.

== Samoa, 1914 ==
At the outbreak of the First World War, New Zealand still lacked a fully operational army nursing service. Nevertheless, six New Zealand nurses accompanied the Samoa Expeditionary Force which departed New Zealand on 15 August 1914 to occupy German Samoa. A seventh nurse joined the group in Suva. The nurses worked at the hospital in Apia for several months before returning to New Zealand.

Samoan Expeditionary Forces 1914 New Zealand Nurses:

- Bertha Grace Nurse
- Fanny Wilson
- Vida MacLean
- Louise Alexa McNie
- Evelyn Brooke
- Louise Elizabeth Brandon
- Ida Willis

== First World War ==
The New Zealand Army Nursing Service was established in January 1915 to provide trained nurses for hospitals supporting the New Zealand Expeditionary Force. On 25 January 1915 the British Army Council accepted an offer from the New Zealand Government to provide 50 nurses for overseas service. Twelve New Zealand nurses departed with an Australian nursing contingent on 1 April, followed on 8 April by the first official contingent of 50 NZANS nurses aboard the Rotorua, escorted by Hester Maclean.

The nurses reached Egypt in June 1915 and were distributed among military hospitals in Alexandria and Cairo, where they cared for sick and wounded personnel evacuated from the Gallipoli campaign. Their work included the treatment of traumatic wounds as well as dysentery, enteric fever and other diseases common among troops serving in the eastern Mediterranean.

New Zealand nurses also served aboard the hospital ships Maheno and Marama. Eleven nurses sailed aboard Maheno in July 1915 and treated casualties evacuated directly from Gallipoli. Marama, New Zealand's second hospital ship, sailed from Wellington in December 1915 and later operated in the Mediterranean and between France and Britain.

On 23 October 1915 ten NZANS nurses were killed when the British transport Marquette was torpedoed in the Aegean Sea while carrying No. 1 New Zealand Stationary Hospital from Alexandria to Salonika. The ten nurses formed the largest single group of New Zealand servicewomen killed during the war.

Following the transfer of the New Zealand Division to France in 1916, NZANS nurses served with New Zealand stationary and general hospitals in France and Britain. No. 1 New Zealand Stationary Hospital operated at Amiens, Hazebrouck and later Wisques, while New Zealand general hospitals were established at Brockenhurst, Walton-on-Thames and Codford. Nurses cared for casualties from major battles including the Battle of the Somme, Messines and Passchendaele, and treated severe trauma, gas injuries, infection and psychological casualties.

Approximately 550 New Zealand nurses served overseas during the First World War as members of the NZANS, while around another 100 New Zealand women served with British, French and other nursing organisations. Sixteen New Zealand nurses died during the conflict, including the ten killed aboard Marquette.

The wartime service of New Zealand nurses also influenced civilian nursing practice. Many returned to civilian hospitals after the war with experience gained in high-volume trauma, infectious disease and military hospital administration.

== Interwar period ==
After the First World War the NZANS returned principally to a reserve role. Members continued to undertake military training and remained available for mobilisation in the event of another conflict.

Hester Maclean remained matron-in-chief until 1923 and was succeeded by Jessie Bicknell. During the interwar period nursing officers maintained links with civilian hospitals and the Department of Health while continuing military training. Ida Willis, who became matron-in-chief in 1933, had remained in the NZANS reserve after the First World War and regularly attended camps and instructed personnel of the New Zealand Medical Corps.

== Second World War ==
The NZANS was mobilised again following the outbreak of the Second World War. Approximately 650 trained nurses served in military hospitals, camps, transport vessels and overseas medical units during the conflict. Ida Willis, as matron-in-chief, coordinated the nursing service during the war.

NZANS personnel served in New Zealand and alongside the 2nd New Zealand Expeditionary Force overseas. Nurses worked in military hospitals in Egypt and the wider Middle East and later supported New Zealand forces during operations in the Mediterranean and Italy. Some also served aboard hospital ships and transport vessels carrying wounded and sick personnel between operational theatres and New Zealand.

Army nurse Pauline Hanrahan, for example, served aboard the Dutch hospital ship Oranje from 1943, transporting wounded servicemen between the Middle East, South Africa, Australia, New Zealand, Britain and Italy before serving at No. 1 New Zealand General Hospital in Cairo.

By July 1943 the Army Nursing Service comprised about 450 qualified nurses then serving or available for service in military hospitals in New Zealand and overseas, as well as on transports and hospital ships; its wartime strength subsequently increased.

The wartime mobilisation reinforced the need for a small permanent nursing component after 1945. Until the end of the Second World War, New Zealand military nurses had served full-time in the Army primarily during periods of war; following the conflict a nucleus of Regular Force nursing officers was retained so that nursing capability could be expanded rapidly if required.

== Post-war reorganisation and royal title ==
In the immediate post-war period the Army retained a small permanent nursing establishment. In 1949 the New Zealand Army reported a strength of ten nursing sisters and six Voluntary Aid Detachment personnel; some were seconded to the Royal New Zealand Navy and Royal New Zealand Air Force.

In 1953 the New Zealand Army Nursing Service was reorganised and renamed the Royal New Zealand Nursing Corps. The creation of the corps formalised military nursing as a continuing element of the post-war Army rather than a service mobilised principally during major conflicts.

The RNZNC subsequently developed both Regular Force and Territorial, later Army Reserve, components. Nursing officers also served on secondment with the other armed services, reflecting the increasingly joint character of New Zealand military health support.

== Vietnam War ==
RNZNC nursing officers served during the Vietnam War, including attachments to Australian military medical units at Vung Tau. New Zealand military nurses worked at the 1st Australian Field Hospital and other Australian medical facilities treating Allied casualties.

RNZNC nursing officers were generally deployed in small numbers. Former Territorial Force nurse Karen Pilcher recalled that only one or two New Zealand military nurses at a time were normally attached to Australian units in Vietnam.

Among the RNZNC personnel who served in Vietnam was Daphne Shaw, who spent a year with No. 1 Australian Field Hospital at Vung Tau in 1971, caring for medical, surgical and intensive-care patients. Claire Jacobson and Pamela Miley were also among New Zealand nursing officers attached to Australian medical organisations in South Vietnam.

RNZNC officers also contributed to aeromedical evacuation. Nursing officers attached to the Royal New Zealand Air Force accompanied casualties aboard transport aircraft operating between South Vietnam, Singapore and New Zealand.

Military nursing formed only part of New Zealand's wider medical contribution to Vietnam. New Zealand civilian surgical teams operated at Qui Nhon from 1963 to 1975, while the 1st New Zealand Services Medical Team at Bong Son provided civilian medical care and trained Vietnamese health workers between 1967 and 1971.

== Peacekeeping, humanitarian operations and contemporary deployments ==
From the 1990s, the operational role of the RNZNC broadened considerably beyond conventional military nursing. Nursing officers deployed on peacekeeping, humanitarian assistance, disaster relief and expeditionary operations, often working in small joint or multinational medical teams and, in some cases, undertaking aeromedical evacuation, primary care, trauma nursing and health-support planning. The increasingly joint nature of NZDF health support also saw RNZNC officers posted or attached to Royal New Zealand Air Force medical units and other tri-service organisations.

=== Gulf War and Somalia ===
RNZNC nursing officers returned to operational service in the Middle East during the Gulf War in 1991, when six nurses deployed as part of the 1st New Zealand Army Medical Team to the United States Navy Fleet Hospital at Bahrain. The team worked within the 500-bed shore-based hospital and included RNZNC officers alongside medical and other specialist personnel.

RNZNC officers also supported New Zealand participation in the United Nations Operation in Somalia II from 1993. Nursing personnel served with New Zealand contingents and provided primary health care, aeromedical evacuation and medical support to deployed personnel. In some cases they also supported humanitarian activity and civilian medical work alongside military duties.

=== Rwanda and Bosnia ===
During the 1994 humanitarian response to the Rwandan genocide, RNZNC personnel supported an RNZAF C-130 Hercules detachment operating from Entebbe, Uganda. Nursing officers were responsible for health support to the New Zealand contingent, including preventive health, medical stores and operational medical planning.

From 1994 to 1996, RNZNC officers deployed to Bosnia with New Zealand forces serving under the United Nations Protection Force (UNPROFOR). Nursing officers provided medical support to New Zealand and coalition personnel and participated in humanitarian medical activity among the local population.

=== Bougainville ===
RNZNC officers served in Bougainville during the late 1990s as part of New Zealand and Australian-led peace-support operations. Nursing officers worked within field-hospital and health-support facilities and provided ward, trauma and primary-care support, while also assisting local populations when operational conditions permitted.

=== East Timor ===
The deployment to East Timor from 1999 was one of the largest sustained RNZNC commitments of the post-war period. Nursing officers served with the New Zealand Forward Surgical Team (FST), regimental aid posts (RAP) and RNZAF aeromedical elements during INTERFET and subsequent United Nations missions.

The New Zealand FST included an operating theatre, resuscitation area, laboratory, X-ray capability, intensive-care and dependency beds. RNZNC officers worked across primary health care, emergency, surgical, postoperative and aeromedical roles. The facility treated New Zealand and coalition personnel and, as the security situation stabilised, also provided care to seriously ill or injured East Timorese civilians.

Between 1999 and 2002, 26 RNZNC nurses are recorded as having served in East Timor, some on more than one rotation, with further nursing officers deploying during renewed unrest from 2006. RNZNC personnel were also posted to RNZAF units supporting the East Timor mission, including units that later received multinational recognition for their service.

=== Afghanistan and Iraq ===
RNZNC officers deployed to Afghanistan from 2003 as part of the Task Group Crib, the New Zealand Provincial Reconstruction Team (NZPRT) in Bamyan Province and as part of Task Group Manaaki, the NATO Role 2 Multinational Medical Unit at Kandahar Airfield. Twenty-two RNZNC nursing officers are recorded as having served in Afghanistan, with some deploying more than once.

In Bamyan, nursing officers worked at the New Zealand regimental aid post (RAP) alongside medical officers and RNZAMC medics and also contributed to health education and training for Afghan organisations. In Kandahar as part of NATO Multinational Medical Unit Role 2, RNZNC and RNZAMC officers worked in trauma bays and intermediate-care wards treating coalition personnel and local nationals with severe combat injuries.

One RNZNC nursing officer deployed with the 15th New Zealand Provincial Reconstruction Team rotation in 2009 and established the "Bamyan Babies" project after identifying poor conditions affecting women and infants in Bamyan. The initiative provided clothing, heating, baby supplies and basic medical support, established local production of reusable nappies and supported recruitment of a child-health specialist at Bamyan Hospital. The officer was subsequently awarded the Distinguished Service Decoration for this work.

RNZNC personnel also served in Iraq as part of Task Group Rake from 2003 in support of New Zealand reconstruction and training commitments in Basra. Nursing officers continued to deploy to Iraq as part of Task Group Taji in later operations, including health-support roles alongside coalition forces. NZDF has continued to identify Iraq, Afghanistan and the Sinai among recent operational environments in which RNZNC nursing officers have served.

=== Disaster relief and humanitarian assistance ===
RNZNC personnel have also contributed regularly to humanitarian and disaster-relief operations in New Zealand and throughout the Pacific and Asia.

Following the Papua New Guinea tsunami in July 1998, RNZNC officers deployed to Vanimo as part of the New Zealand response. Nursing officers worked alongside Australian medical personnel in field-hospital and postoperative facilities, caring for large numbers of casualties and supporting the evacuation of patients by RNZAF aircraft.

After the 2004 Indian Ocean earthquake and tsunami, RNZNC officers deployed to Thailand and Indonesia. An initial aeromedical evacuation team assisted injured New Zealanders in Phuket, while further nursing personnel deployed to Banda Aceh under Operation Sumatra Assist and worked alongside the Australian-led ANZAC Field Hospital. RNZNC nurses worked in resuscitation, surgical, intensive-care, infectious-disease and primary-care roles during the operation.

RNZNC officers deployed again following the 2009 Samoa earthquake and tsunami, supporting medical relief, search-and-rescue and aeromedical evacuation activity.

Following the 2011 Christchurch earthquake, RNZNC nursing officers worked in medical facilities as part of the wider NZDF response. The earthquake resulted in the largest humanitarian-assistance operation undertaken by the NZDF, involving more than 1,700 Defence Force personnel.

=== Multinational health engagement ===
RNZNC personnel have also participated in multinational health-engagement missions, including Pacific Partnership deployments aboard United States Navy hospital ships. These missions have provided opportunities for RNZNC officers to work within multinational medical teams delivering surgical, nursing, dental and humanitarian health services in the Asia-Pacific region. Such deployments form part of the broader contemporary role of RNZNC nursing officers, who may be employed across primary care, trauma, perioperative, aeromedical and humanitarian health-support environments.

== Organisation and role ==
The RNZNC is a specialist, officer-only corps of the New Zealand Army. All uniformed nurses in the NZDF are recruited into the RNZNC and must be registered nurses before appointment as nursing officers. Members serve either full-time in the Regular Force or part-time in the Army Reserve.

Unlike First World War NZANS nurses, who held honorary military rank, modern RNZNC members are commissioned officers. Candidates must meet both professional nursing requirements and the selection standards for Army officers, including successfully completing the New Zealand Army Officer Selection Board (OSB) and the Specialist Officer Induction Course (SOIC) at Waiouru Military Camp.

Nursing officers work across a range of clinical fields, including primary health care, emergency nursing, medical and surgical nursing, post anesthetic and perioperative care. They may practise in NZDF health centres, aboard Royal New Zealand Navy vessels and Royal New Zealand Air Force aircraft, in civilian hospitals and clinics, or within deployed military treatment facilities. Nursing officers may practise independently under NZDF standing orders, including Defence Medical Treatment Protocols (DMTPs), or in accordance with the orders of NZDF medical officers.

Because the NZDF is comparatively small, nursing officers are expected to maintain broad clinical competence and to work autonomously across a variety of environments while collaborating closely with peers and colleagues. Their duties may include direct patient care, health surveillance, health education, medical operations planning, health administration, clinical leadership, supervision, clinical governance, delegation of care, and support to deployed medical systems.

The RNZNC works closely with the Royal New Zealand Army Medical Corps, which provides much of the NZDF's military medical workforce. Nursing officers are therefore expected to practise collaboratively in Role 1 and Role 2 settings alongside RNZAMC medics, medical officers, and other specialist officers, including radiologists, laboratory scientists, and General List officers. Nurses constitute the largest group of registered deployable health practitioners within the Army health system and may have responsibility for clinical governance and for directing care delivered by medics and other health personnel.

Although the corps belongs to the Army, RNZNC officers may be seconded to the Royal New Zealand Navy or Royal New Zealand Air Force, and may serve within joint NZDF health organisations. The use of Army nurses across all three services has a long history; Army reports from the late 1940s record nursing sisters seconded to both the Navy and Air Force.

== Insignia and traditions ==
The traditional badge of the New Zealand Army Nursing Service consisted of a red cross enclosed within a silver fern and surmounted by a crown. Early regulations provided for members of the New Zealand Medical Corps Nursing Reserve to wear a military nursing uniform based on that of Queen Alexandra's Imperial Military Nursing Service, but with New Zealand distinctions.

Following the establishment of the Royal New Zealand Nursing Corps in 1953, the corps adopted insignia incorporating a central nursing lamp, five-pointed star, wreath, crown and corps title. A post-war example held by the Museum of New Zealand Te Papa Tongarewa bears the inscription "ROYAL N.Z. NURSING CORPS".

=== Cap badge ===
The current RNZNC cap badge is a bi-metal design consisting of a gold-coloured five-pointed star, worn with one point directed downwards, enclosed within a laurel wreath and surmounted by St Edward's Crown. A silver scroll at the base bears the inscription "ROYAL N.Z. NURSING CORPS".

At the centre of the star is a stylised heraldic lamp associated with Florence Nightingale and the traditions of military nursing. The five-pointed star derives from the historic New Zealand Registered Nurse badge, designed by Grace Neill and associated with the development of formal nurse registration in New Zealand.

RNZNC personnel wear the cap badge on a red diamond-shaped cloth backing on either the green New Zealand Army beret or NZSAS sand beret if attached. The traditional corps beret was grey.

The RNZNC has longstanding ceremonial links with the British Queen Alexandra's Royal Army Nursing Corps (QARANC). A formal alliance between the New Zealand Army Nursing Service and QARANC was approved by King George VI in 1949.

=== Corps lanyard ===
The ceremonial lanyard of the RNZNC is a dual red-and-white cord worn on the left shoulder with Service Dress (SD) 1A-E. The colours continue the historic use of red and white in New Zealand military nursing dress and insignia.

One of the principal memorials associated with New Zealand military nursing is the Nurses' Bell in the National War Memorial Carillon. New Zealand nurses raised funds for the bell during the 1920s to commemorate nurses and Voluntary Aid Detachment personnel who died during the First World War.

The corps' Colonel-in-Chief is Anne, Princess Royal, who was appointed to the role in 1977.

== Notable members ==
- Jessie Bicknell – deputy matron-in-chief during the First World War and later matron-in-chief.
- Evelyn Brooke – First World War nursing matron and recipient of the Royal Red Cross.
- Janet Gillies – South African War nurse and first matron-in-chief of the New Zealand Medical Corps Nursing Reserve.
- Hester Maclean – founding matron-in-chief of the New Zealand Army Nursing Service and organiser of New Zealand military nursing during the First World War.
- Ida Willis – First World War nurse and matron-in-chief during the Second World War.
- Daphne Shaw – Vietnam War nursing officer and later Chief Nursing Officer.
- Captain Sue Carter, DSD – RNZNC nursing officer who deployed with the 15th rotation of the New Zealand Provincial Reconstruction Team to Bamyan Province, Afghanistan, in 2009. She established the "Bamyan Babies" project to improve care for women and infants in Bamyan, including providing basic clothing, heating, infant supplies and medical care, establishing local production of reusable nappies, and arranging recruitment of a child-health specialist at Bamyan Hospital. She was awarded the New Zealand Distinguished Service Decoration for her work.

== Leadership ==
	Name	Term start	Term end
Matron-in-chief (1915–1957)
1	Hester Maclean; RRC	7 August 1910	9 November 1923
2	Jessie Bicknell; ARRC	10 November 1923	31 March 1931
3	Fanny Wilson; RRC	7 May 1931	4 July 1933
4	Ida Willis; OBE ARRC ED	5 July 1933	22 February 1946
5	Eva Mackay; OBE RRC ED	23 February 1946	14 August 1954
6	Doris Brown (Milne); RRC ED	15 August 1954	31 December 1957
Principal matron (1958–1977)
1	Christina McDonald; RRC	1 April 1958	21 August 1964
2	Mary Wilson; RRC	22 August 1964	29 April 1970
3	Lois Jones; ARRC	29 April 1970	17 May 1977
Lieutenant colonel (1977–1991)
1	Helen Macann; RRC	18 May 1977	14 July 1983
2	Noeline Taylor; ARRC	14 July 1983	1 March 1985
3	Thursa Kennedy; RRC	1 March 1985	3 June 1991
Chief nursing officer (1991–present)
1	Daphne Shaw; RRC	1 July 1991	1 January 1997
2	Diane Swap; MNZM	2 January 1997	23 June 2002
3	Gerard Wood; CStJ	24 June 2002	12 December 2007
4	Maree Sheard	13 December 2007	10 December 2012
5	Lee Turner	10 December 2012	?
6	Michelle Williams		
7	David Foote	December 2023	present

== Order of precedence ==
Preceded by New Zealand Army Physical Training Corps	New Zealand Army Order of Precedence	Succeeded by None stated
