= Louise Elizabeth Brandon =

New Zealand nurse (1879–1962)

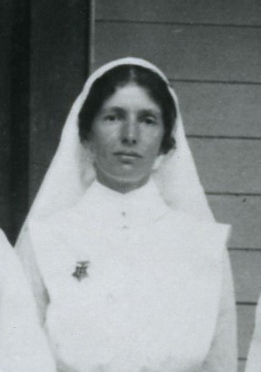
- Born: 1879; Wellington, New Zealand
- Died: 23 September 1945 (aged 65–66)
- Military career
- Allegiance: New Zealand
- Branch: New Zealand Army Nursing Service, New Zealand Expeditionary Force
- Rank: Matron
- Service number: WWI 22/106, WWI 3/76
- Unit: New Zealand Army Nursing Service
- Conflicts: First World War
- Awards: Royal Red Cross, MID

Louise Elizabeth Brandon (1879–1945) was a military nurse during World War I with the New Zealand Army Nursing Service Corps and the Samoan Expeditionary Forces in 1914.

Brandon was born in Wellington in 1879 to mother Anna Naria Wilson and father Henry de Bathe Brandon.

== Career ==
=== Nursing ===
Brandon completed her nursing training in 1909 and joined a contingent of nurses that went to Apia Samoa in August 1914. She sailed on board the Moeraki with nurses Evelyn Brooke, and Fanny Wilson. Brandon and the other New Zealand nurses treated local Samoans with eye disease. While the climate conditions deemed challenging at times for the nurses, they completed their service returning in early 1915.

Brandon spent the remainder of the War alongside nurse, Louise Alexa McNie working as theatre-sisters on New Zealand hospital ships, such as SS Maheno and SS Marama and headed for the front. Brandon arrived to ANZAC Cove on 26 August 1915. Wounded soldiers from Gallipoli were treated or transported to military hospitals in Malta or Alexandria. She returned to New Zealand on 1 January 1916 and continued working on both the SS Maheno and SS Marama. Her third and final overseas posting was on the SS Corinthic where she was the Matron of the New Zealand Officer's Convalescence Hospital in Brighton, England.

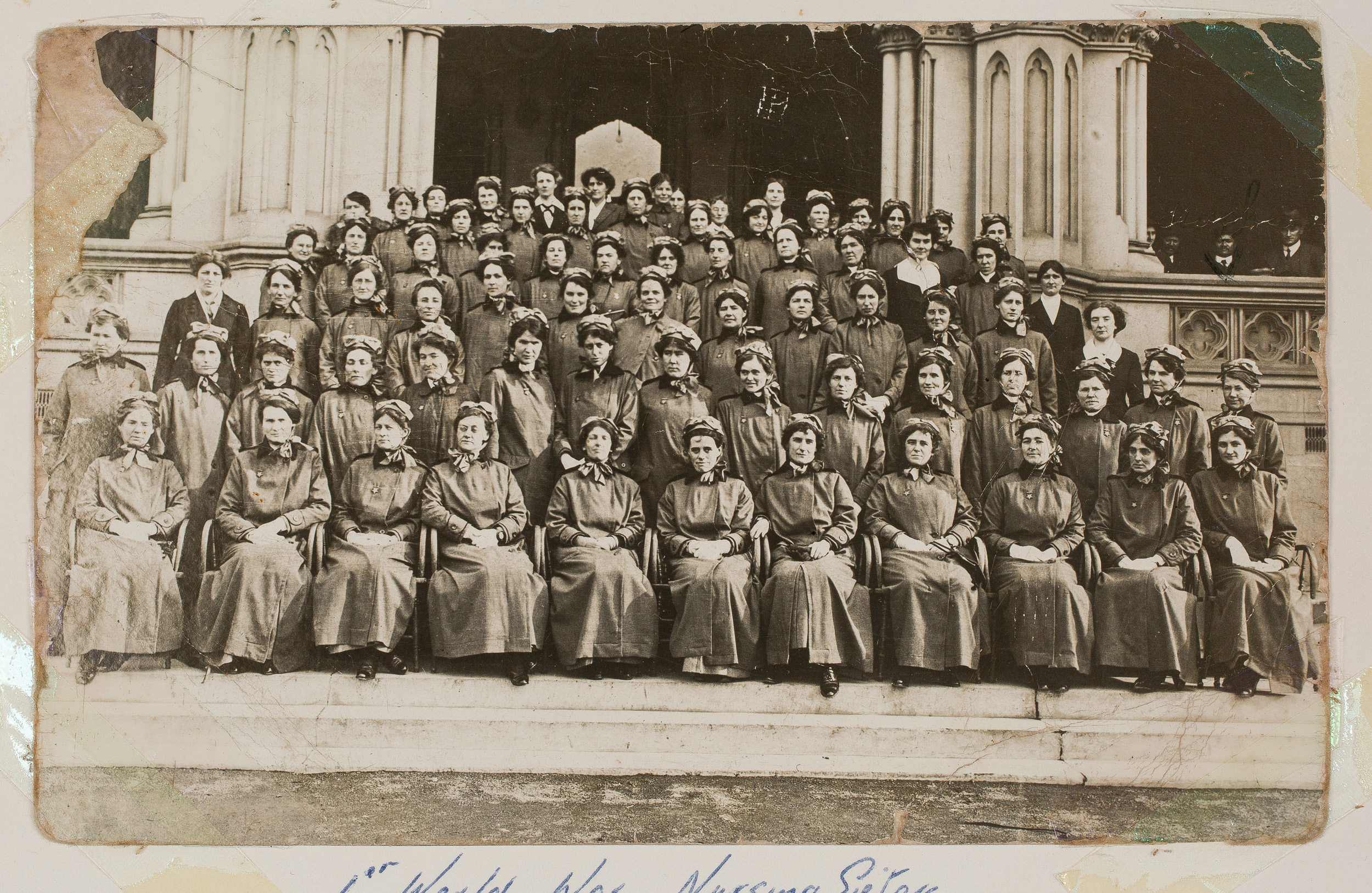
WWI nurses, taken on the steps of the Parliamentary Library. 1st row fifth from the left is Louise Brandon.

Brandon was awarded the Associate Royal Red Cross in 1917. After the war, Brandon became Matron of the Military Hospital in Rotorua and later started her own practice.

=== Journalism ===
Brandon also held positions of editor with the New Zealand Free Lance as well as The New Zealand Times.

== Personal life ==
Brandon's brother Major Percy Eustace de Bath Brandon was a decorated soldier who served in Egypt. She never married and lived in her Thorndon home until her death. Brandon died in Wellington Hospital on September 23, 1945, after a long illness.
