= Bertha Grace Nurse =

New Zealand nurse (1879–1962)

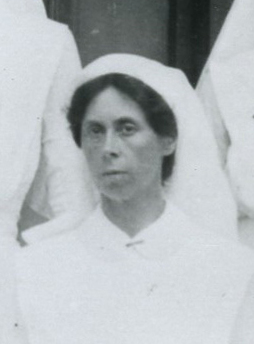
- Born: 1871; Southland, New Zealand
- Died: 20 December 1960 (aged 88–89); Christchurch, New Zealand
- Military career
- Allegiance: New Zealand
- Branch: New Zealand Army Nursing Service, New Zealand Expeditionary Force
- Rank: Matron
- Service number: WWI 22/1
- Unit: New Zealand Army Nursing Service
- Conflicts: First World War
- Awards: Royal Red Cross, MID

Bertha Grace Nurse was a civilian and military nurse during World War I with the New Zealand Army Nursing Service Corps and the Samoan Expeditionary Forces in 1914.

== Early life and education ==
Nurse was born in Southland in 1871, to mother Alice Louisa Price and father William Hugh Nurse. She completed her nurse training in 1904 in Wellington, and was the first New Zealand nurse to enlist in the Expeditionary Force.

== Nursing career ==
Nurse joined the New Zealand Army Nursing Service Corps on 10 August 1914 and quickly was selected for the contingent of six New Zealand nurses to be stationed at Apia Hospital as part of the New Zealand Samoan Expeditionary Forces. Nurse sailed alongside Louise Alexa McNie and Vida MacLean on board the Monowai.

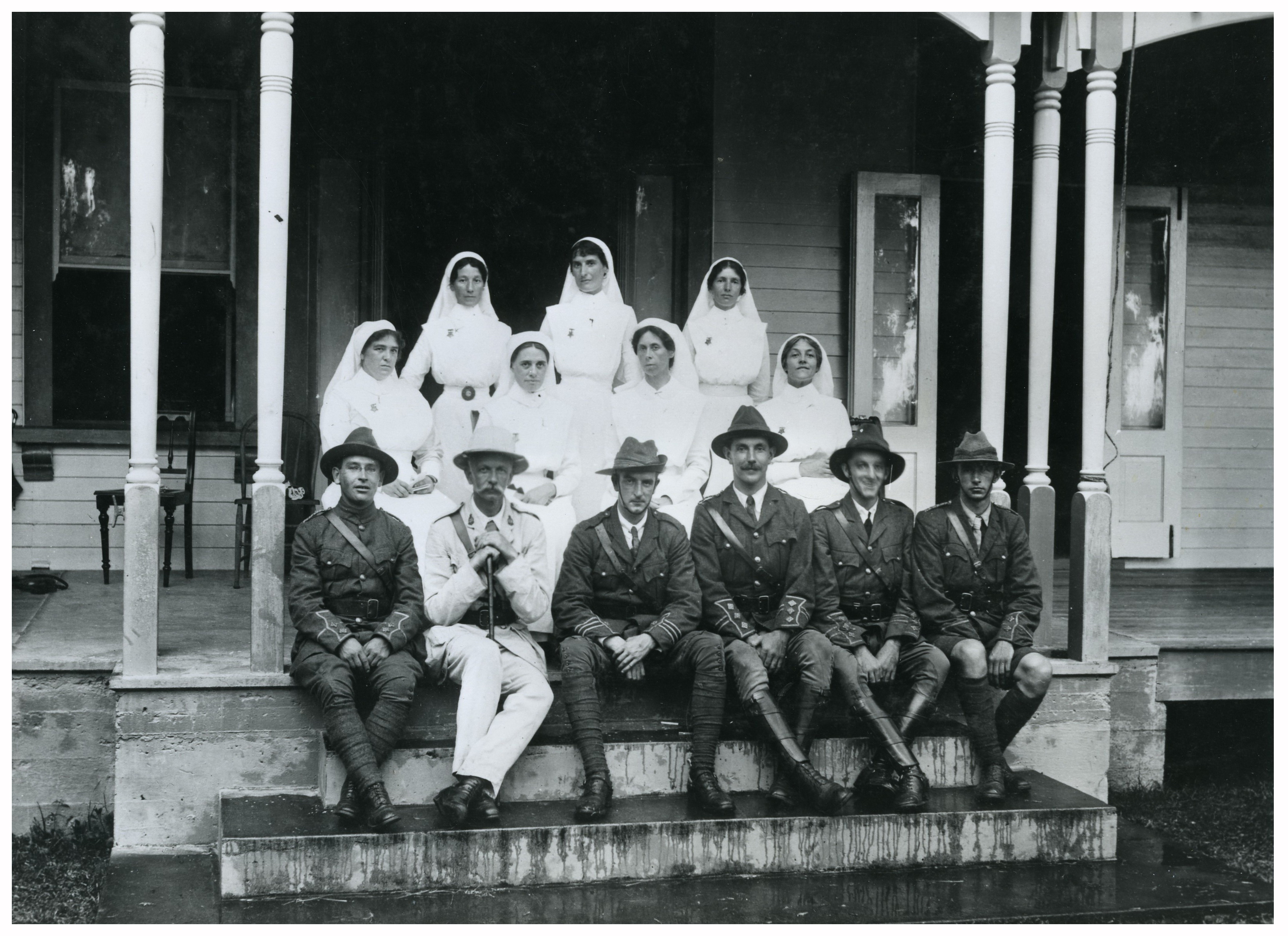
New Zealand Nurses at Apia Hospital, Samoa, August 1914.

Nurse remained in Samoa until March 1915, returning to New Zealand to then leave to serve in Egypt on board the SS Rotorua, in April 1915. She became matron of Pont de Koubbeh Hospital, taking over Matron Michel.

Later, she was transferred to the South of England to be matron at the No 1 New Zealand General Hospital in Brockenhurst. She stayed in this role until January 1917.

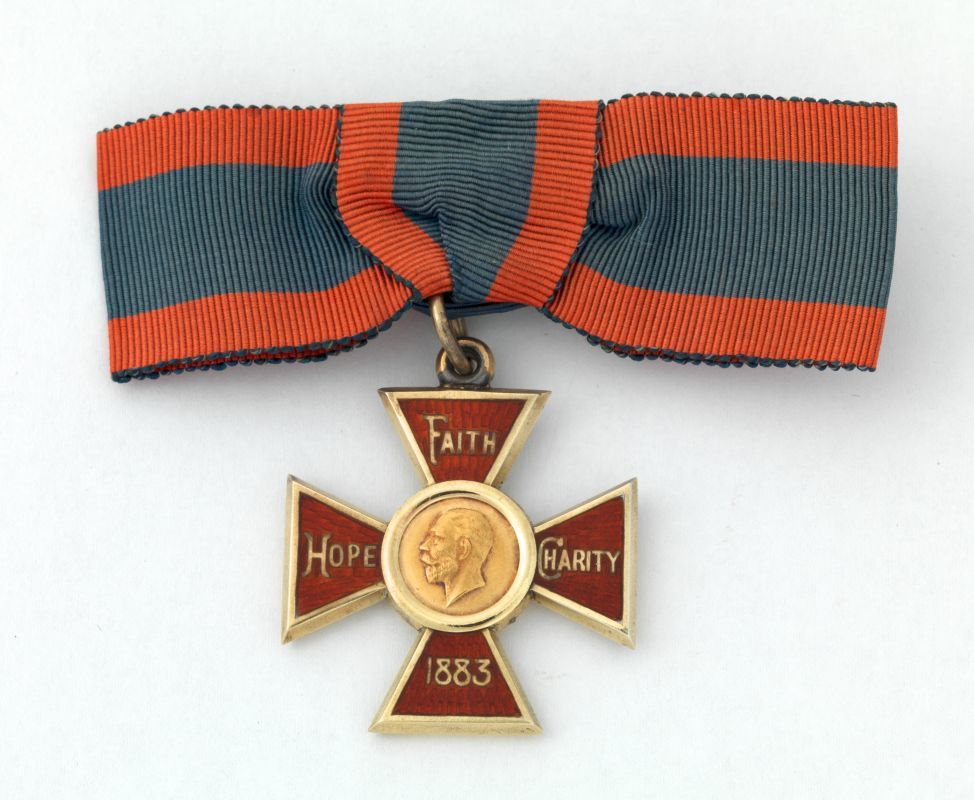
Example of Royal Red Cross 1st Class (RRC) Medal

On 6 February 1917, Nurse was called to attend a meeting in London, where she was told she would be recalled back to New Zealand. After some confusion, it was found out that this request was made by her medical officers purely due to friction between Nurse and the officers. Her requests to remain in England were denied and she spent the remainder of time in England at the Nurses Rest Home in Sandwich. Nurse returned to New Zealand as matron on board the HMNZT Maunganui on 17 March 1917. Matron Hester Maclean supported Nurse in her unfair dismissal and found her work at the Trentham Military Hospital. She then worked as matron at Masterton Hospital.

Nurse was awarded a Royal Red Cross, 1st Class and was mentioned in dispatches in 1916.

== Personal life ==
Nurse had a sister Frances Louisa Nurse (born 1876) who also served as a nurse in World War I. She also had a brother, Charles Edward Nurse (9 July 1869 – 10 June 1945), who served in the South African War, World War I and as a home guard during World War II.

Nurse died at the Nurse Maude Convalescent Home in Christchurch, 20 December 1960 at age 89. She is buried at the Ruru Lawn Cemetery in Christchurch.
