= Louise Alexa McNie =

New Zealand nurse (1879–1962)

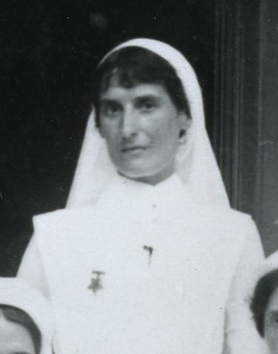
- Born: 15 July 1879; Canterbury, New Zealand
- Died: 9 May 1941 (aged 61); Auckland, New Zealand
- Military career
- Allegiance: New Zealand
- Branch: New Zealand Expeditionary Force
- Rank: Matron
- Nickname: Louie
- Service number: WWI 22/144
- Unit: New Zealand Army Nursing Service
- Conflicts: First World War
- Awards: Royal Red Cross

Louise Alexa McNie (15 July 1879- 9 May 1942) (also known as Louie or Louise Alexa Buchanan) was a nurse in the New Zealand Army Nursing Service Corps and the Samoan Expeditionary Forces in 1914.

McNie was born in Christchurch on 15 July 1879 to Mother Lizzie and father Alexander Raymond McNie. She passed her Nurses' Registration in 1909 and trained in the Christchurch Hospital.

== Nursing career ==
=== Service in Samoa ===
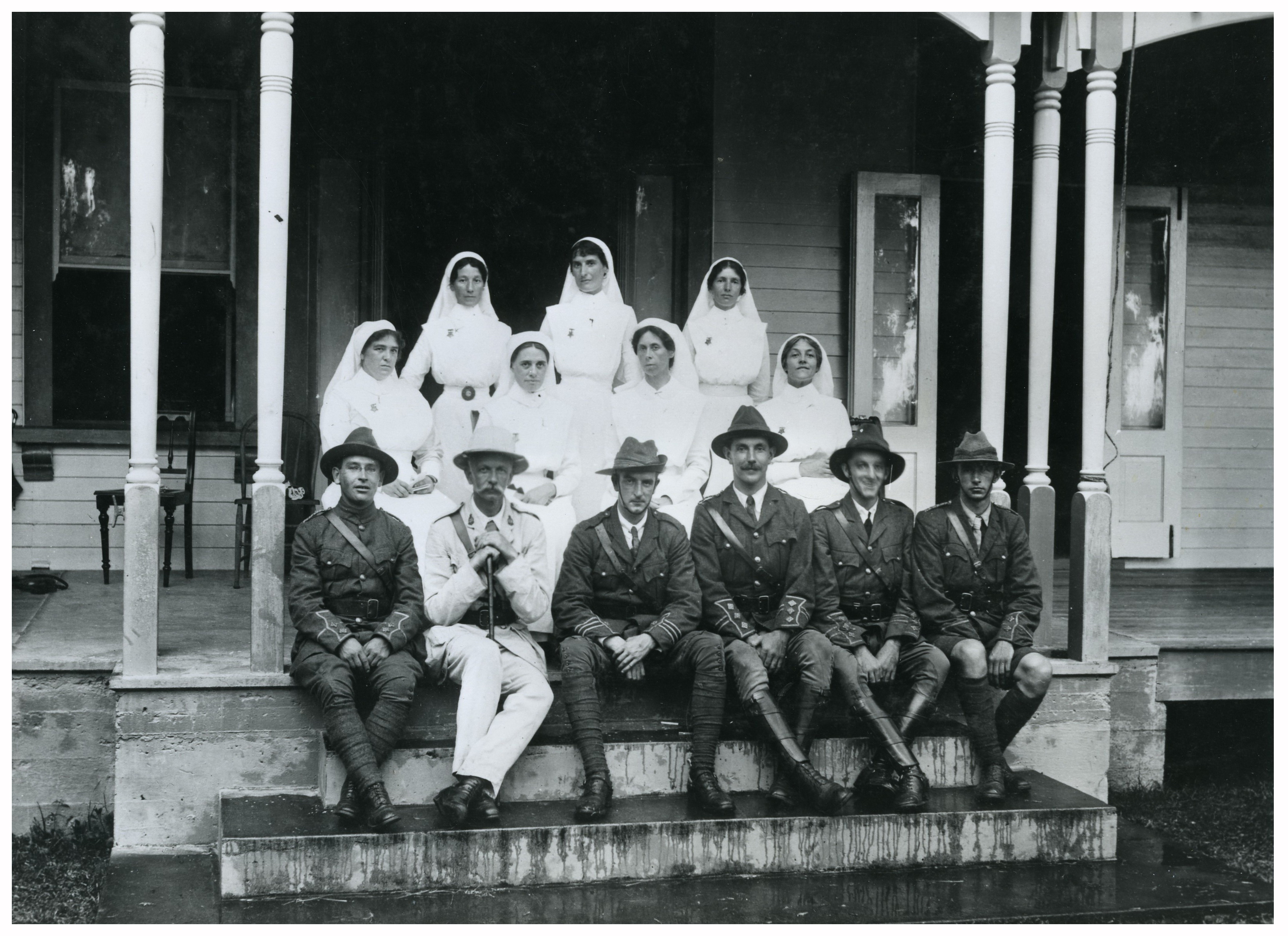
This image shows Brooke alongside a group of New Zealand nursing staff and members of the armed forces at Apia Hospital. Back, from left: Sisters Veda/Vida McLean, Louise McNie, Louise Brandon. Middle row, from left: Sisters Ida Willis, Eva Brooke, Matron Betha Nurse, Sister Fanny Wilson. Front row, from left: Dr David Isaacs, Major Kendall, Major Matthew Holmes, Captain Duncan Stout, Captain Mick Tapper, Lieutenant Ward.

On the outbreak of WWI, a small fleet of New Zealand nurses left for Apia, Samoa. McNie was one of these seven nurses, that in mid-August 1914, travelled alongside troops to German occupied Samoa to replace German nurses working at the Apia hospital. All the nurses came from Wellington, apart from Christchurch's McNie who was called upon on her day off. McNie was given just one day to prepare, pack and say goodbye to her family before ferrying to Wellington to meet with the rest of the nurses and set sail for Apia. McNie travelled on HMNZS Monowai alongside Bertha Nurse and Vida MacLean while the rest of the nursing team, Evelyn Brooke, Fanny Wilson and Louise Brandon sailed on the Moeraki. As they set sail, McNie and the other nurses made history as the first New Zealand nurses sent offshore as members of the WWI New Zealand Defence Force.

The ships made stops in Nouméa, New Caledonia then Suva, Fiji before arriving at their destination, Apia, Samoa. The working conditions in Apia were unlike anything the McNie and the other New Zealand nurses were used to. The heat posed the biggest barrier as McNie noted her experiences in Samoa:

We are very happy in our little Hospital just busy enough to keep us healthy and cheerful. One cannot work very hard in this country. The climate is a very trying one. I find that a light eight-hour duty really tries me more than did a heavy 12-hour one in Christchurch. It is so hot and steaming, one is never dry. We are always having either sponge or shower bath, and changing our clothes, but in a very short time we find ourselves just as damp as ever. Notwithstanding the climate we are all keeping remarkably well. We average about 25 patients- chiefly dengue fever and dysentery. Some of the boys have been very ill indeed. I never want to see any worse, but we have been fortunate enough to be able to get them well enough either to send back to duty, or transferable to New Zealand. Major Homes always sent all rheumatic or chest cases back home. This climate does not agree with them at all. I love Samoa, apart from the heat and the mosquitoes. It is certainly the most beautiful place I have seen. We never tire of exploring the roads and bush and finding fresh beauties ever day.

— extract from McNie, Kai Tiaki, January 1915

McNie worked at the Apia hospital for nine months before returning home to New Zealand on the SS Atua in May, 1915.

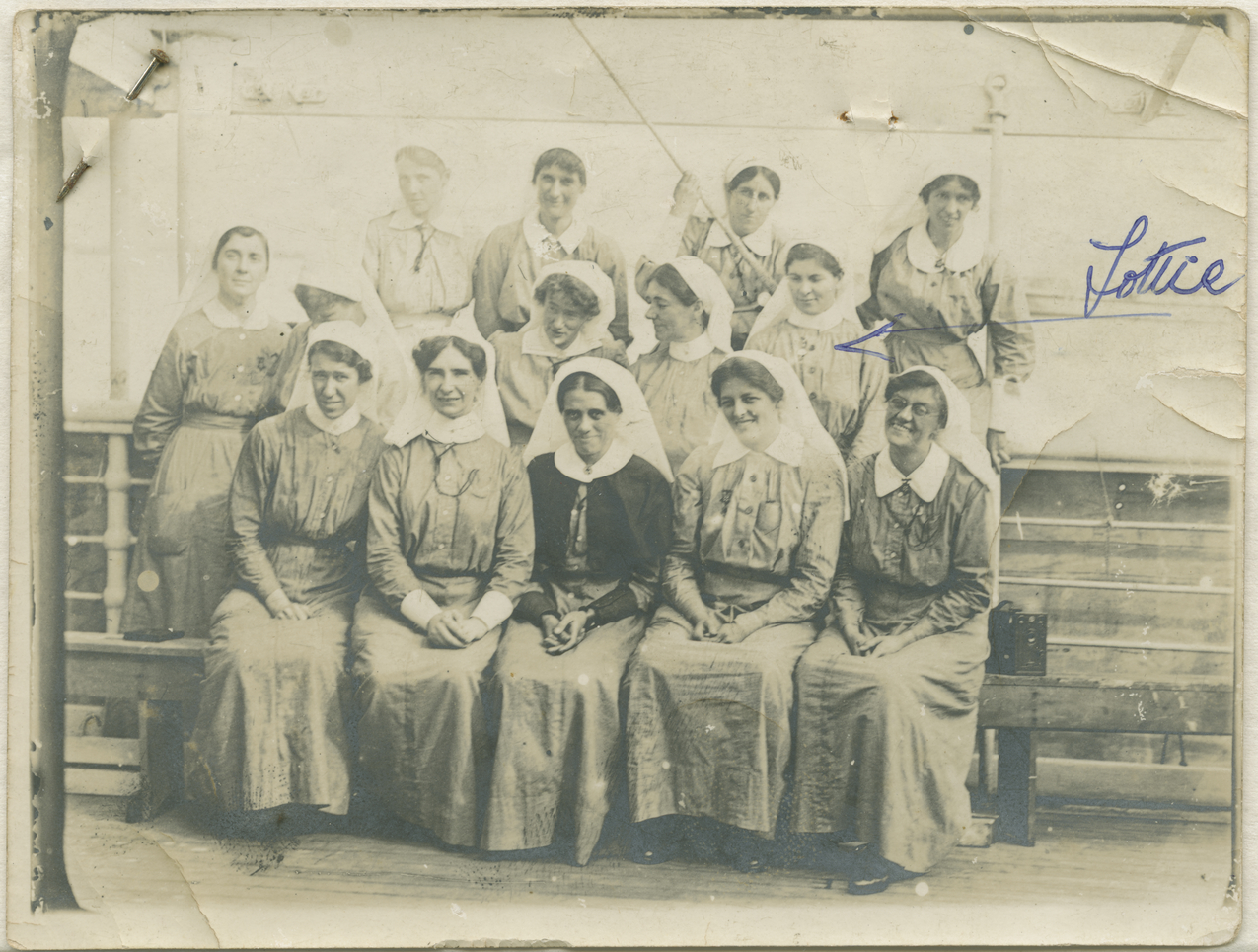
New Zealand nurses on board SS Maheno, 1915.

=== SS Maheno & Marama ===
Later during WWI McNie was selected in a contingent of nurses that worked as a theatre-sisters on New Zealand hospital ships headed for the front. These ships hosted cramped living conditions and nurses, like McNie, often worked long hours from 6:30am till midnight.

McNie sailed to Gallipoli on the SS Maheno as one of 13 nurses, alongside Brooke, who she had worked with in Samoa. The SS Maheno made six trips from Anzac Cove to the Greek Island of Lemnos where the military hospitals were located.

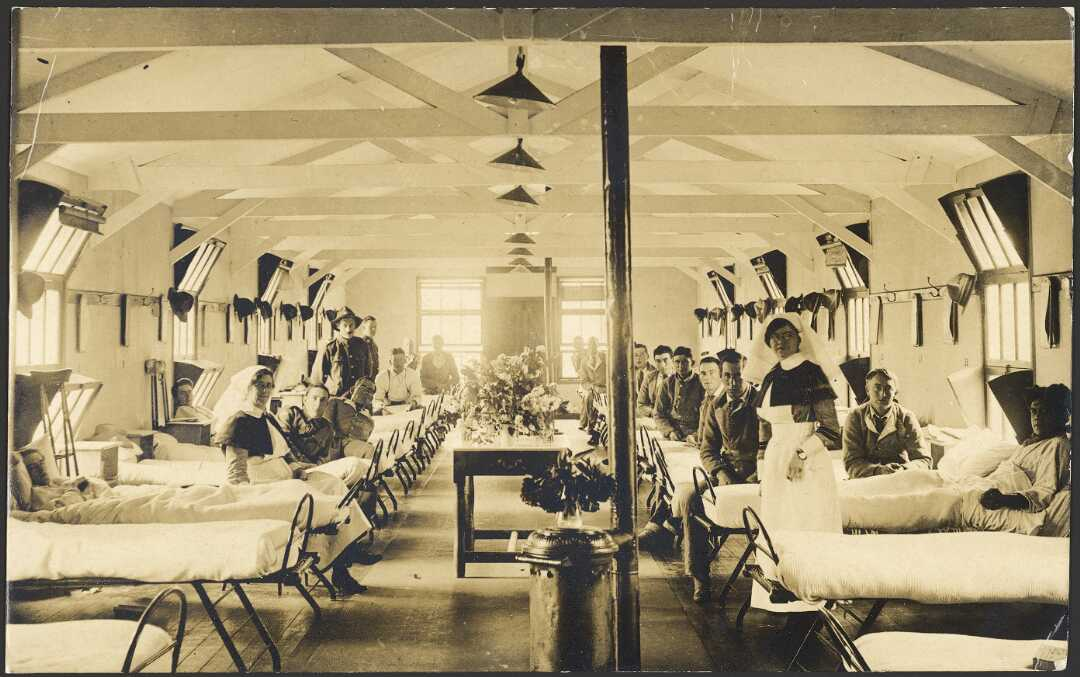
Interior of a ward at No.3 New Zealand General Hospital, Codford, Wiltshire, 1917

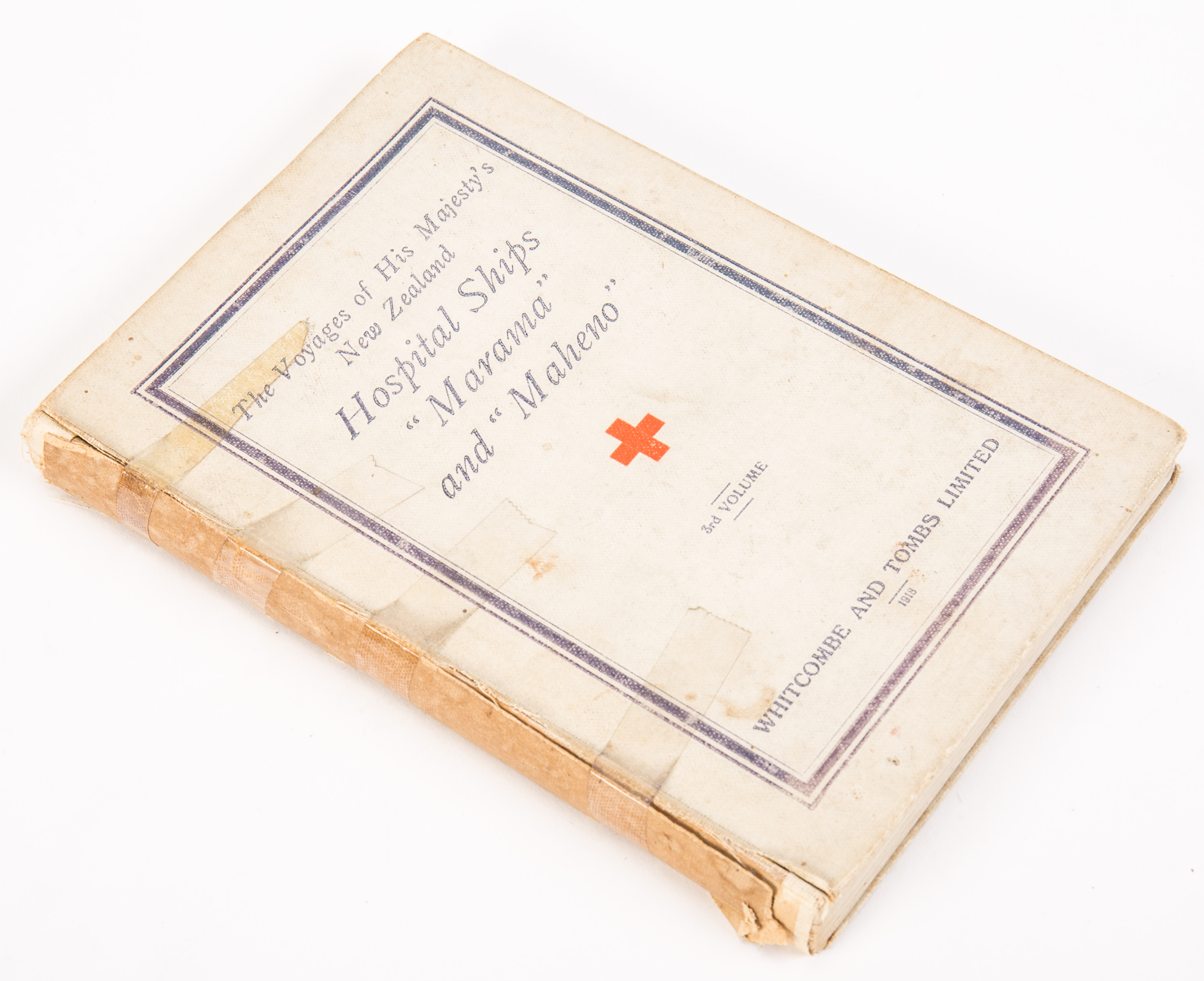
The Voyages of His Majesty's New Zealand Hospital Ships Marama and Maheno (Belonged to Sister Kathleen Susan Cumming)

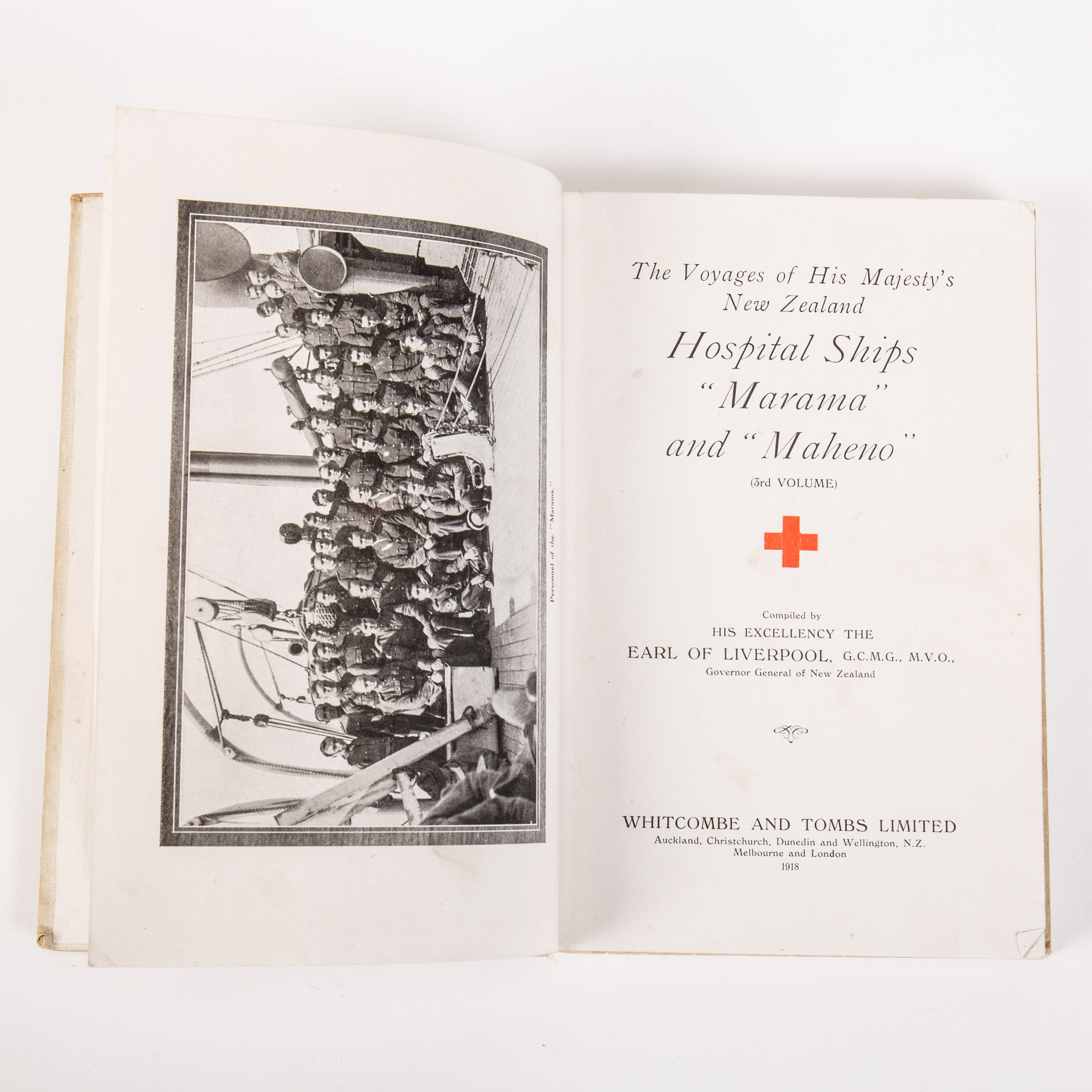
The Voyages of His Majesty's New Zealand Hospital Ships Marama and Maheno (Belonged to Sister Kathleen Susan Cumming)

After her service on the Maheno, McNie went on as matron at the Featherston Military Hospital for several months. She also worked on the SS Marama. It is also recorded that McNie was matron at the No. 3 New Zealand General Hospital in Codford, England for a period.

=== Awards ===
McNie was a recipient of both the Associate Red Cross in 1917 and the Royal Red Cross in 1919, which only 14 other New Zealand nurses were awarded.

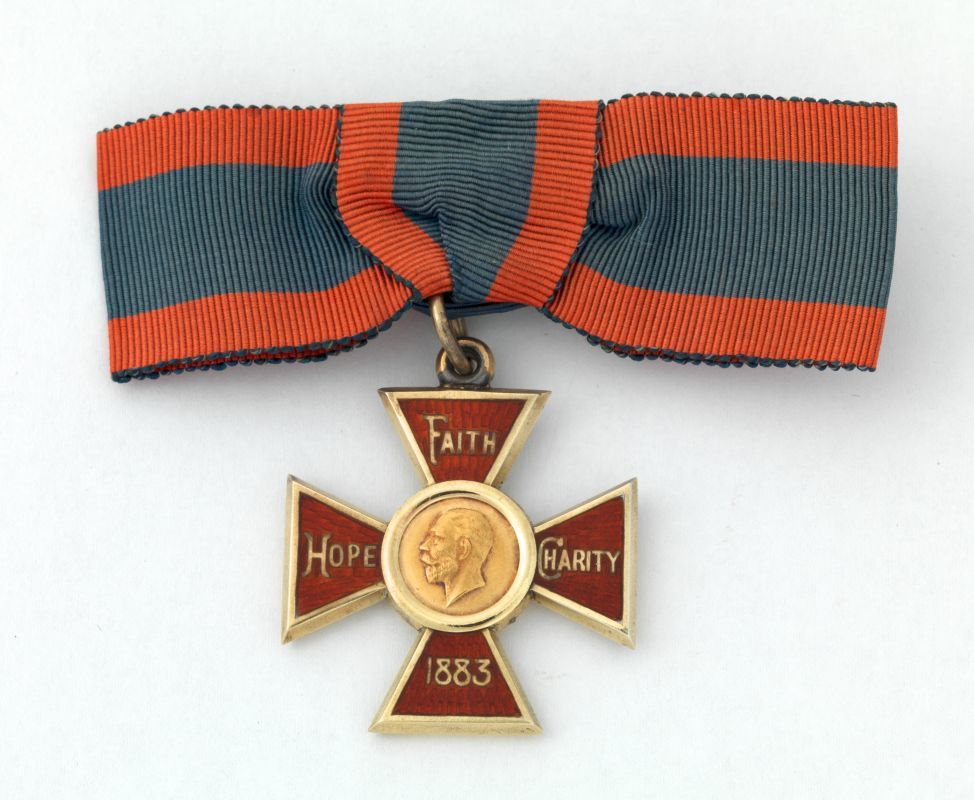
Example of Royal Red Cross (RRC)1st Class (Belonging to Matron Cora B Anderson)

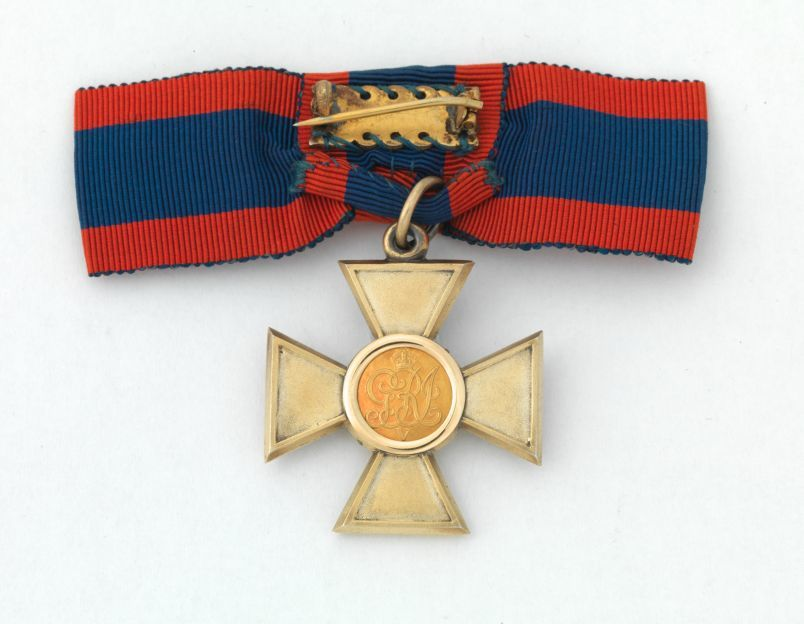
Example of Royal Red Cross (RRC)1st Class (Belonging to Matron Cora B Anderson) back

== Personal life ==
On 4 February 1920 McNie married Henry Meredith Buchanan, a doctor originally from Edinburgh, who was the Auckland Mental Hospital Medical Superintendent from 1929 to his retirement in 1952.

McNie died on May 9, 1941, in Auckland.
