= Charlotte Le Gallais =

New Zealand World War I Nurse

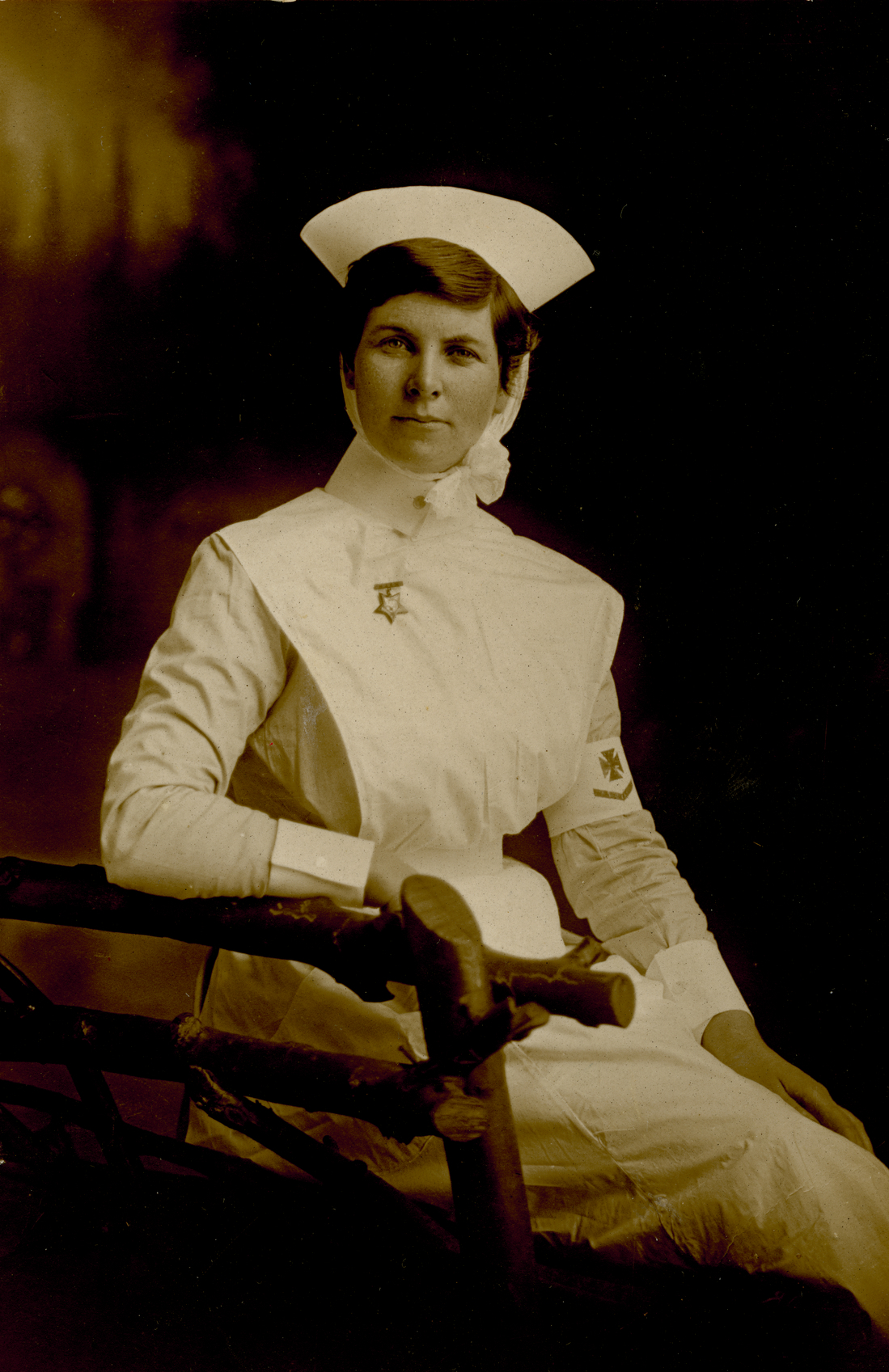
- Born: 1881; Auckland, New Zealand
- Died: 1956 (aged 75/76); Auckland, New Zealand
- Military career
- Allegiance: New Zealand
- Branch: New Zealand Expeditionary Force
- Rank: Sister
- Nickname: Lottie
- Service number: WWI 22/137
- Unit: New Zealand Army Nursing Service
- Conflicts: First World War

Charlotte Le Gallais (1881 – 1956) (also known as Lottie or Charlotte Gardner) was a nurse in the New Zealand Army Nursing Service.

== Early life ==
Charlotte Le Gallais was born on 1881 in Clevedon, Auckland, to Horatio and Eliza Le Gallais. She was the eldest of four siblings. After her mother's death in 1908, Le Gallais began training as a nurse and achieved registration in 1911. After achieving registration, Le Gallais joined the staff of Auckland Public Hospital.

== First World War ==
In June 1915, Le Gallais was selected as one of eleven New Zealand Army Nursing Service nurses who were to staff the hospital ship Maheno, which was the second contingent of nurses sent by New Zealand in World War I. In a letter to Leddie, a New Zealand soldier based in the Gallipoli peninsular, Le Gallais remarked on the Maheno,—

The ship is beautiful. The New Zealand hospital ship, it is, and has been subscribed to by all the people of New Zealand, and she is a great white huge monster, three great red crosses on either side, and green stripes. She looks just what she is - an errand of mercy for all you men. And very proud I am to be one of the staff.

The Maheno arrived off the coast of Gallipoli on 26 August 1915, after which Le Gallais attended to the injured. Le Gallais wrote to her boyfriend, Sonnie Gardner on 13 September from Malta,—

We anchor about 1/2 mile from firing line - guns going off all round us shaking the ship and startling the life out of me each time they begin - its a dreadful place Gallipoli, dreadful and awful - don't think I regret coming - the work is terrible but we are needed badly.

Two of Le Gallais's four brothers also served in World War I, and her brother Leddra (Leddie) was already in Gallipoli when she had embarked from Wellington. He was killed on 23 July 1915, but due to lost mail Le Gallais only learned this news in October 1915.

Later, Le Gallais endured 'terrible clean-ups' aboard the Maheno as it transported wounded soldiers between Gallipoli and hospitals in Lemnos and Egypt. However, following orders to return to New Zealand, the Maheno arrived in Auckland on 1 January 1916, carrying 319 New Zealand patients. Le Gallias worked again at the Auckland Public Hospital and later nursed at the Featherston Military Camp during the 1918 influenza pandemic.

== Later life ==
Charlotte Le Gallais married Charles Fisher (Sonny) Gardner in 1918 and had two children. They lived the rest of their married life in New Lynn, Auckland where Sonny served as the Mayor. She also served as a nurse in Darwin, Australia during World War Two. Charlotte died in 1956.

Le Gallais is featured in the Gallipoli: The Scale of Our War exhibition at Te Papa as a large scale model created by Weta Workshop.

== Bibliography ==
- Cairns, Puawai; Keith, Michael; Pugsley, Christoper; Taylor, Richard (2022). Gallipoli: The Scale of our War. Wellington: Te Papa Press. ISBN 9781991150950.
- Tolerton, Anne (2017). Make Her Praises Heard Afar: New Zealand Women Overseas in World War One. Wellington: Booklovers Press. ISBN 9780473399658.
- Rogers, Anna (2003). While You're Away: New Zealand Nurses at War 1899-1948. Auckland: Auckland University Press. ISBN 9781869403010.
