= Janet Gillies =

New Zealand civilian and military nurse, army nursing administrator

- Born: 31 January 1864; Whanganui, New Zealand
- Died: 24 July 1947 (aged 83); Auckland, New Zealand
- Military career
- Allegiance: United Kingdom; New Zealand
- Branch: British Army (1900–02); New Zealand Military Forces (1908–10)
- Service years: 1900–1902; 1908–1910
- Rank: Matron-in-Chief
- Commands: New Zealand Medical Corps Nursing Reserve (1908–10)
- Conflicts: Second Boer War

Janet Gillies (31 January 1864 – 24 July 1947) was a New Zealand civilian and military nurse, army nursing administrator. She was born in Whanganui, New Zealand, on 31 January 1864. Between 1899 and 1902 she served as a nurse in the Second Boer War. She was awarded the King's South Africa Medal. After returning to New Zealand, she became an advocate for the establishment of the New Zealand Army Nursing Service.
