= SS Rotorua =

SS Rotorua has been the name of different steamships, including:

- SS Rotorua, launched in 1910, and sunk by a U-boat in 1917;
- SS Rotorua, launched in 1911 as Shropshire; renamed Rotorua in 1923; and sunk by a U-boat in 1940.
