= Evelyn Brooke =

New Zealand nurse (1879–1962)

Evelyn Brown
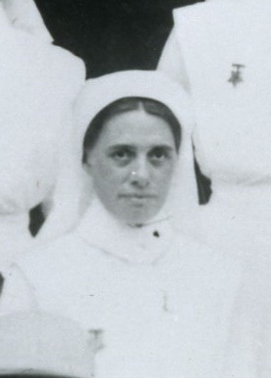
- Born: Evelyn Gertrude Brooke; 11 February 1879; New Plymouth, New Zealand
- Died: 11 February 1962 (aged 83); Wellington, New Zealand
- Burial place: Karori Cemetery
- Military career
- Allegiance: New Zealand
- Branch: New Zealand Expeditionary Force
- Service years: 1914–1920
- Rank: Matron
- Unit: New Zealand Army Nursing Service
- Conflicts: First World War
- Awards: Royal Red Cross & Bar; Mentioned in Despatches

Evelyn Gertrude Brown, RRC & Bar (née Brooke; 13 September 1879 – 11 February 1962), usually known as Eva, was a New Zealand civilian and military nurse. She served during the First World War and was the only New Zealand nurse to receive the Royal Red Cross and Bar.

== Early life ==
Brooke was born in New Plymouth, Taranaki, on 13 September 1879. Her father, Thomas Brooke, was a carpenter who died in 1891. Her mother, Kate (née Coad), moved to Wellington after his death and remarried. Brooke trained as a nurse at Masterton Hospital from 1902 to 1904, and then at Wellington Hospital from 1904 to 1907.

== Nursing career ==
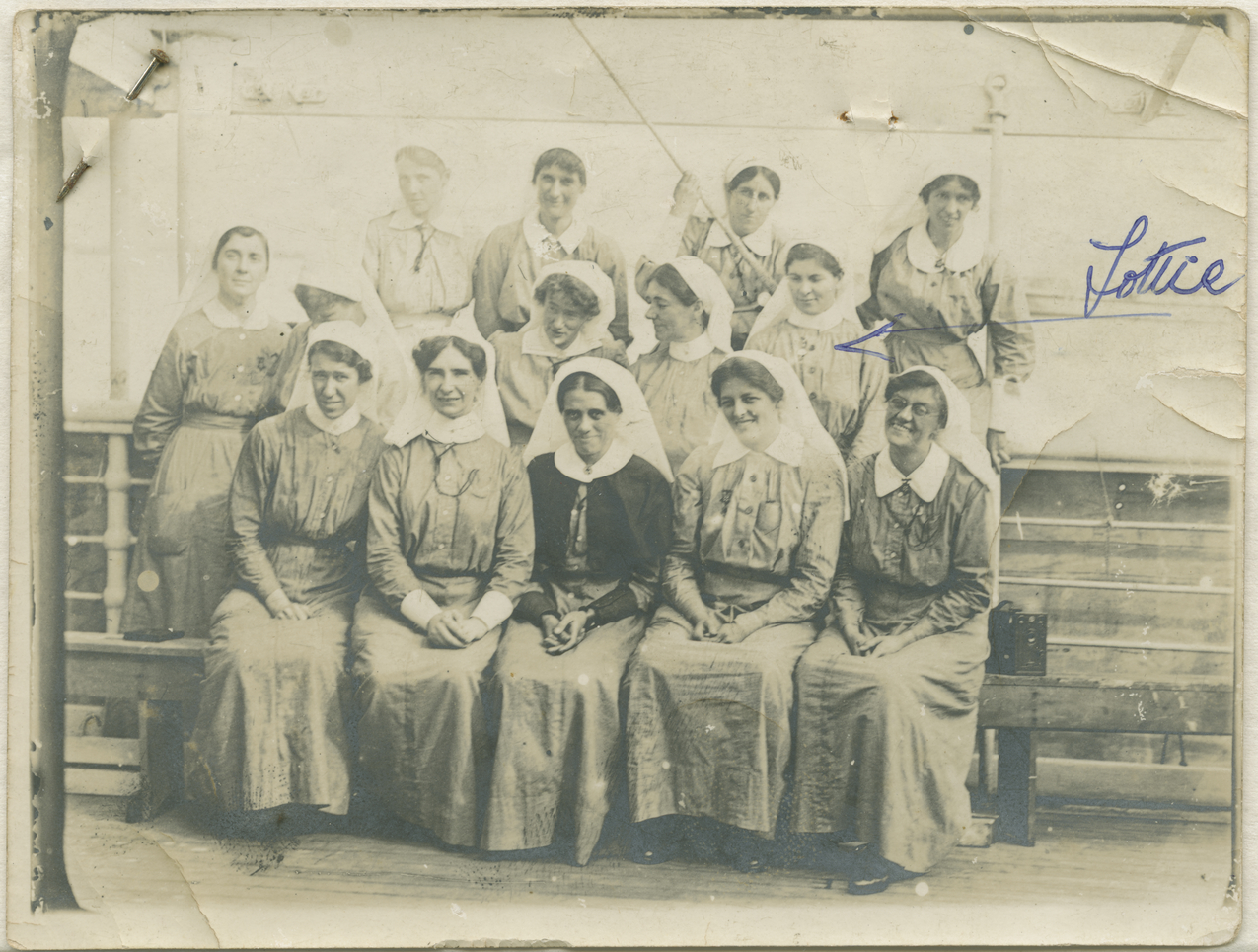
Unidentified group of New Zealand nurses on board SS Maheno, 1915

After completing her training, Brooke nursed at a private hospital in Hāwera, followed by a position at Wellington Hospital from 1910 to 1914.

In August 1914, Brooke joined a group of six nurses who were sent to German Samoa with the New Zealand Expeditionary Force. She was appointed second-in-charge, and promoted to matron while in Apia. She returned to New Zealand in 1915. Shortly after, she departed again as matron on the New Zealand Hospital Ship Maheno. The ship left Wellington for Gallipoli, carrying 14 nurses from the New Zealand Army Nursing Service. In August and September 1915 the Maheno made five visits to Anzac Cove, nursing wounded and sick soldiers in the heat of the summer. In January 1916, Brooke returned to New Zealand and worked as matron of the Trentham military hospital near Wellington. In November 1916 she returned to a hospital ship, the Marama.

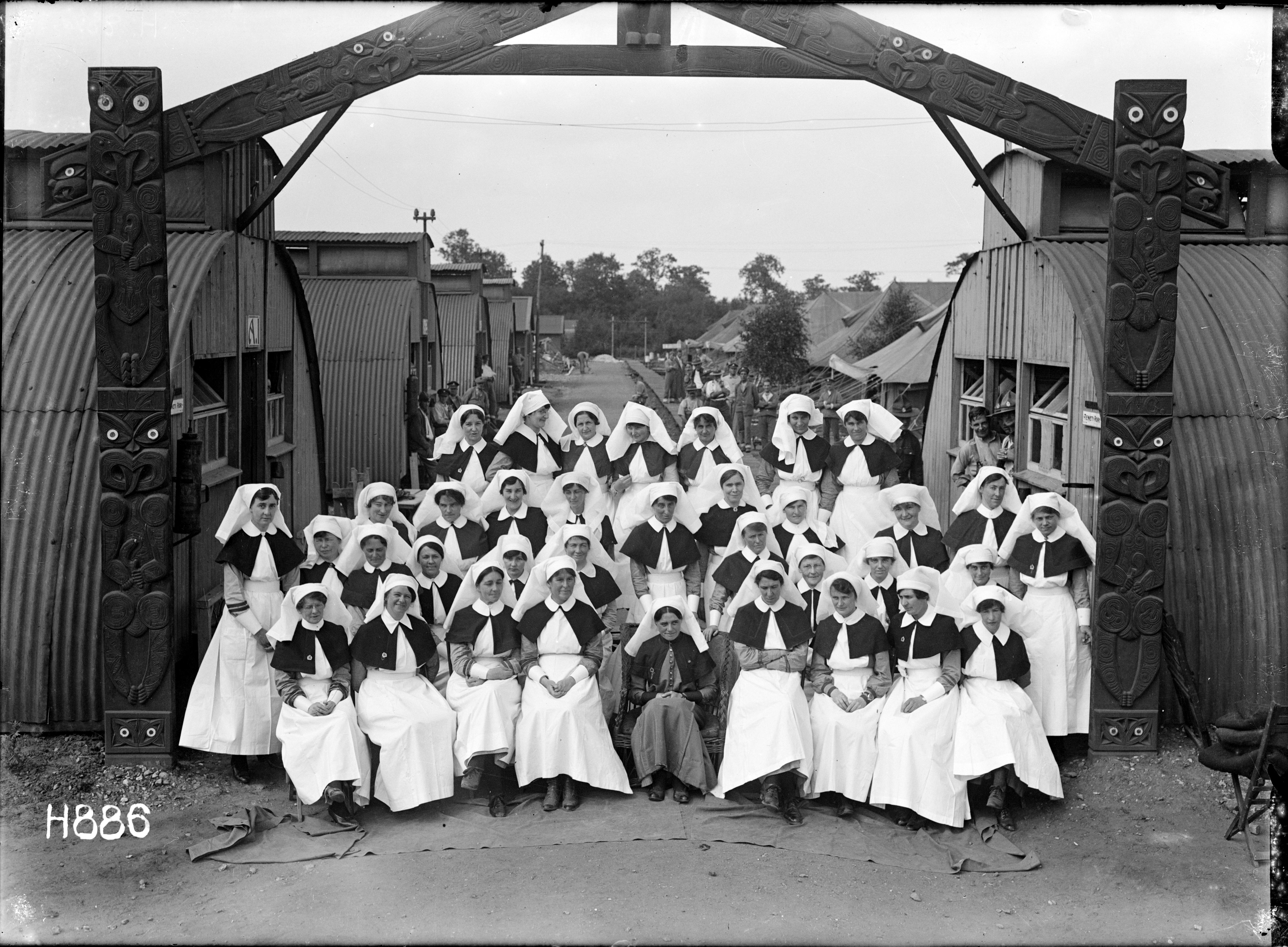
Nurses at New Zealand Stationary Hospital, Wisques with Matron Evelyn Brooke in the centre, 1918.

In May 1917, Brooke went to Brighton, England and took the position of matron at the New Zealand Hospital for Officers. At the end of the year, she was transferred to No. 1 New Zealand Stationary Hospital at Wisques, France. She was presented with a letter of thanks by French soldiers who were nursed at Wisques. After the war, she returned to New Zealand, and was matron of the military hospital at Featherston from June to December 1919, and then spent a year at Narrow Neck Military Hospital in Devonport, Auckland.

In 1921, Brooke was appointed matron at the Rannerdale Veterans' Home in Christchurch, a position she held until her marriage in 1925.

=== Honours ===
In 1917, Brooke was awarded the Royal Red Cross "In recognition of her nursing service in connection with the War." In the 1919 King's Birthday Honours she was awarded the Bar "In recognition of her valuable service with the Armies in France and Flanders."

In 2014, Brooke's medals were part of a display at Archives New Zealand, "Two Wellingtonians at War". In 2015, an image of Brooke appeared on a New Zealand postage stamp, part of a series commemorating the centenary of the Gallipoli campaign.

== Personal life ==
In 1925, Brooke married William John Brown of Nelson and they lived together in Christchurch. After his death, Brooke moved back to Wellington and worked as a private nurse until her retirement in 1955. She died in Wellington on 11 February 1962, and is buried in Karori Cemetery.
