= SS Maheno =

Ocean liner and hospital ship

Coordinates: 25°16′1.55″S 153°14′18.75″E

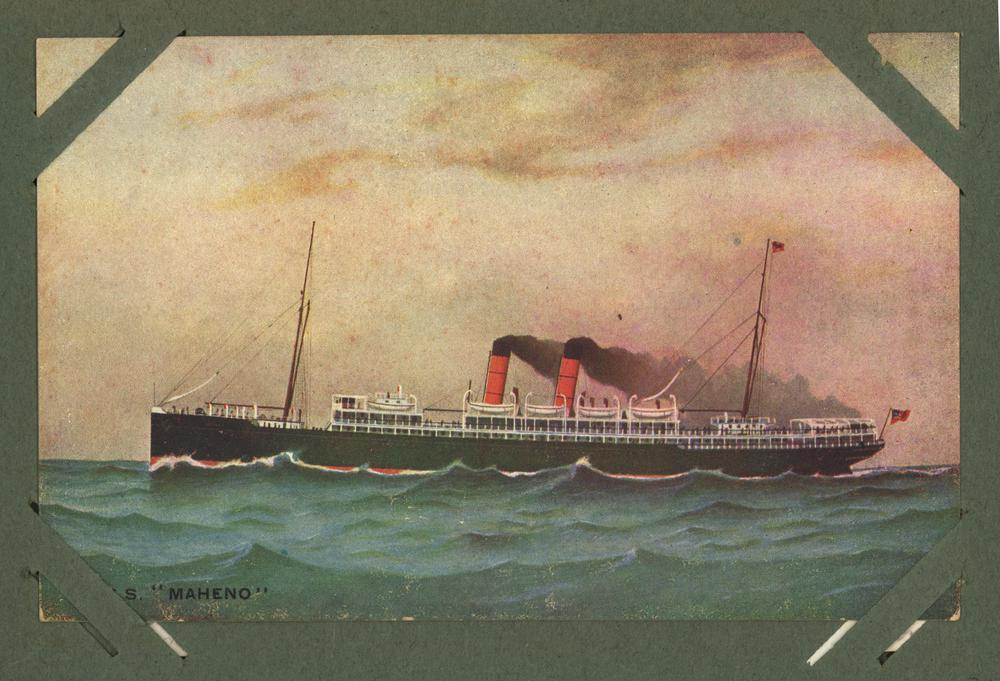
- Hand-coloured postcard of the SS Maheno

History

New Zealand
- Name: SS Maheno
- Owner: Union Company, Dunedin
- Port of registry: Wellington
- Route: New Zealand — Australia
- Builder: William Denny and Brothers, Dumbarton
- Yard number: 746
- Launched: 19 June 1905
- In service: November 1905
- Out of service: 1935
- Identification: Official number: 117588
- Fate: Wrecked, July 1935

General characteristics
- Type: Ocean liner
- Tonnage: 5,323 GRT; 3,318 NRT
- Length: 400 ft (120 m)
- Beam: 50 ft (15 m)
- Depth: 31 ft (9.4 m)
- Propulsion: 3 × Parsons steam turbines; 3 screws
- Speed: 17.5 knots (32.4 km/h; 20.1 mph)
- Capacity: 420 passengers: 240 × 1st class; 120 × 2nd class; 60 × 3rd class

SS Maheno was an ocean liner belonging to the Union Company of New Zealand that operated in the Tasman Sea, crossing between New Zealand and Australia, from 1905 until 1935.

She was also used as a ship by the New Zealand Naval Forces during World War I; as His Majesty's New Zealand Hospital Ship No. 1. She was washed ashore on K'gari (Fraser Island) by a cyclone in 1935 where the disintegrating wreck remains as a popular tourist attraction.

== Construction ==
The 5,000-ton steel-hulled ship was built by William Denny and Brothers of Dumbarton, Scotland, and launched on 19 June 1905. At 400 feet in length and 50 feet in the beam, she was powered by three Parsons turbines, giving a speed of 17.5 knots. She could carry up to 420 passengers: 240 in 1st class, 120 in 2nd and 60 in 3rd, and also had a refrigerated cargo hold. Accommodation for first class passengers included a dining room, smoking room, and music room with Bechstein grand piano. The ship was lit by electricity, and was fitted with all the latest safety equipment, which included Clayton sulphur dioxide fire extinguishers.

== Service history ==
The ship was named after Maheno, a township in Otago, and entered service on 18 November 1905. She was employed on routes between Sydney and Melbourne via ports in New Zealand and Hobart, Tasmania, and also made regular voyages between Sydney and Vancouver.

=== World War I ===
The New Zealand hospital ship Maheno

During World War I Maheno was converted into a hospital ship using money raised by an appeal by the Earl of Liverpool, the Governor-General. She was fitted with eight wards and two operating theatres, and had a medical team consisting of five doctors and 61 orderlies from the Army Medical Corps, a matron, thirteen nursing sisters, from the newly formed New Zealand Army Nursing Service and chaplains. In accordance with Article 5 of the 1899 Hague Convention she was repainted white overall, with a broad green stripe along her sides, and large red crosses on the sides and funnels.

HMNZHS Maheno arrived at Moudros, the naval base of the Gallipoli Campaign, on 25 August 1915, and the next day was off ANZAC Cove, loading casualties from the Battle of Hill 60. Over the next three months, she carried casualties from Gallipoli to Malta. They were cared for by members of the New Zealand Army Nursing Service including Evelyn Brooke. Maheno arrived back at New Zealand on 1 January 1916 to refit, then returned to Egypt in February to collect patients for transport back to New Zealand. She then sailed to the UK, arriving at Southampton on 3 July 1916, just after the start the Battle of the Somme. Until October 1916 she operated in the English Channel, returning large numbers of wounded and sick troops from the Western Front to England.

Maheno sailed back to New Zealand in December 1916, and then made six more voyages between New Zealand and the British Isles, bringing back patients. There were criticisms of the Maheno making several trips to New Zealand to refit or to transport wounded soldiers home when most could have gone in a troopship; and also that the ship has been run by the governor (Liverpool) as "His Exc’s pet patriotic hobby". The chief medical officer was William Collins on her first voyage and James Elliott on her second and third voyages. In 1915, Collins "raised hackles by denying nurses their officer status and deluding himself that he could command the ship's commander, the master" (Captain McLean). In 1917, British Major Gretton was critical of the staff and said that Liverpool "puts his friends on the ship when they want soft jobs" and that the ship was nicknamed "Liverpool’s yacht". The complaint got as far as the Secretary of State for the Colonies; Liverpool said Gratton behaved like a cad.

At the war's end in November 1918, Maheno was released from military service and returned to her business owner to resume her commercial life.

=== Running aground on K'gari (Fraser Island) ===
At the end of its commercial life, on 3 July 1935 Maheno left Sydney under tow by the 1,758-ton ship Oonah, a former Tasmanian Steamers Pty. Ltd. Bass Strait ferry, built in 1888, which along with the Maheno had been sold to the shipbreaker's yard Miyachi K.K.K. in Osaka, Japan. The ships were linked by a 900-foot (270 m) 6.75-inch (17.1 cm) wire rope.

On the afternoon of 7 July, about 50 miles from the coast, the towline parted in a cyclone. Attempts to re-attach the towline failed in the heavy seas, and the Maheno, with a skeleton crew of eight men aboard, drifted off and disappeared. The Oonah, with its steering gear temporarily disabled, broadcast a radio message requesting assistance for Maheno, whose propellers had been removed. Maheno was subsequently found on 10 July by an aircraft piloted by Keith Virtue, beached off the coast of K'gari (Fraser Island). The crew had set up camp onshore, waiting for the Oonah to arrive, which it did on 12 July. In January 1936 the wreck was also the location of the marriage of Dudley Weatherley and Beatrice McLean (instead of at Townsville), at the invitation of Captain Takaka, to notes from the ship's organ. The stranded ship was also used as a venue for an experiment in 'rocket mail' in August 1935.

The ship was subsequently stripped of its fittings, but attempts to refloat her failed. The wreck was subsequently offered for sale, but no buyers could be found for it.

== Wreck ==
Maheno has remained at the location since, slowly corroding away. Owing to the now dangerous condition of the ship, access is prohibited. The Australian Department of Defence lists the wreck as a site of unexploded ordnance (UXO) contamination.

Annual Anzac Day services are held at the site of the wreck and a replica of the ship's bell is located there.

SS Maheno on K'gari (Fraser Island)
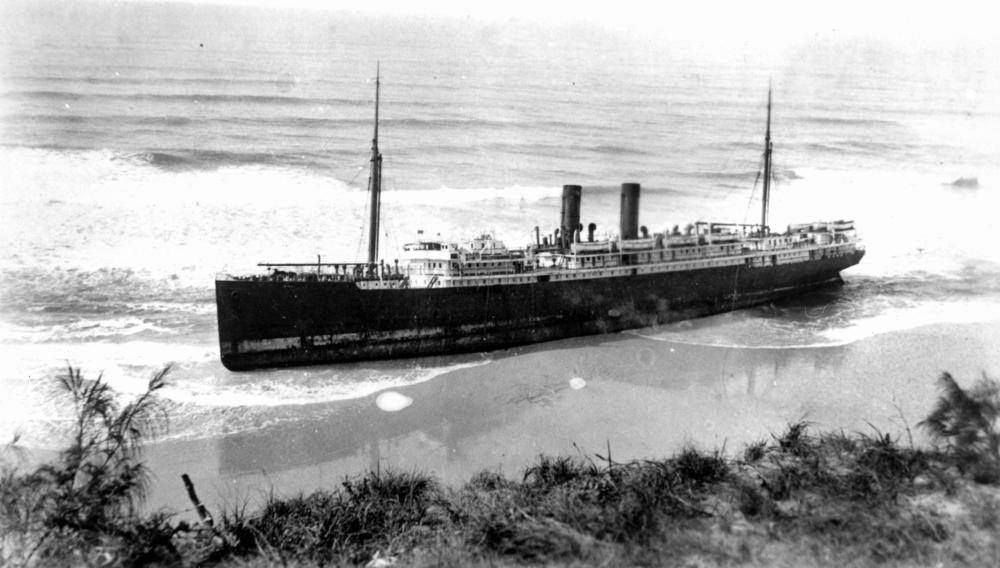
The Maheno beached

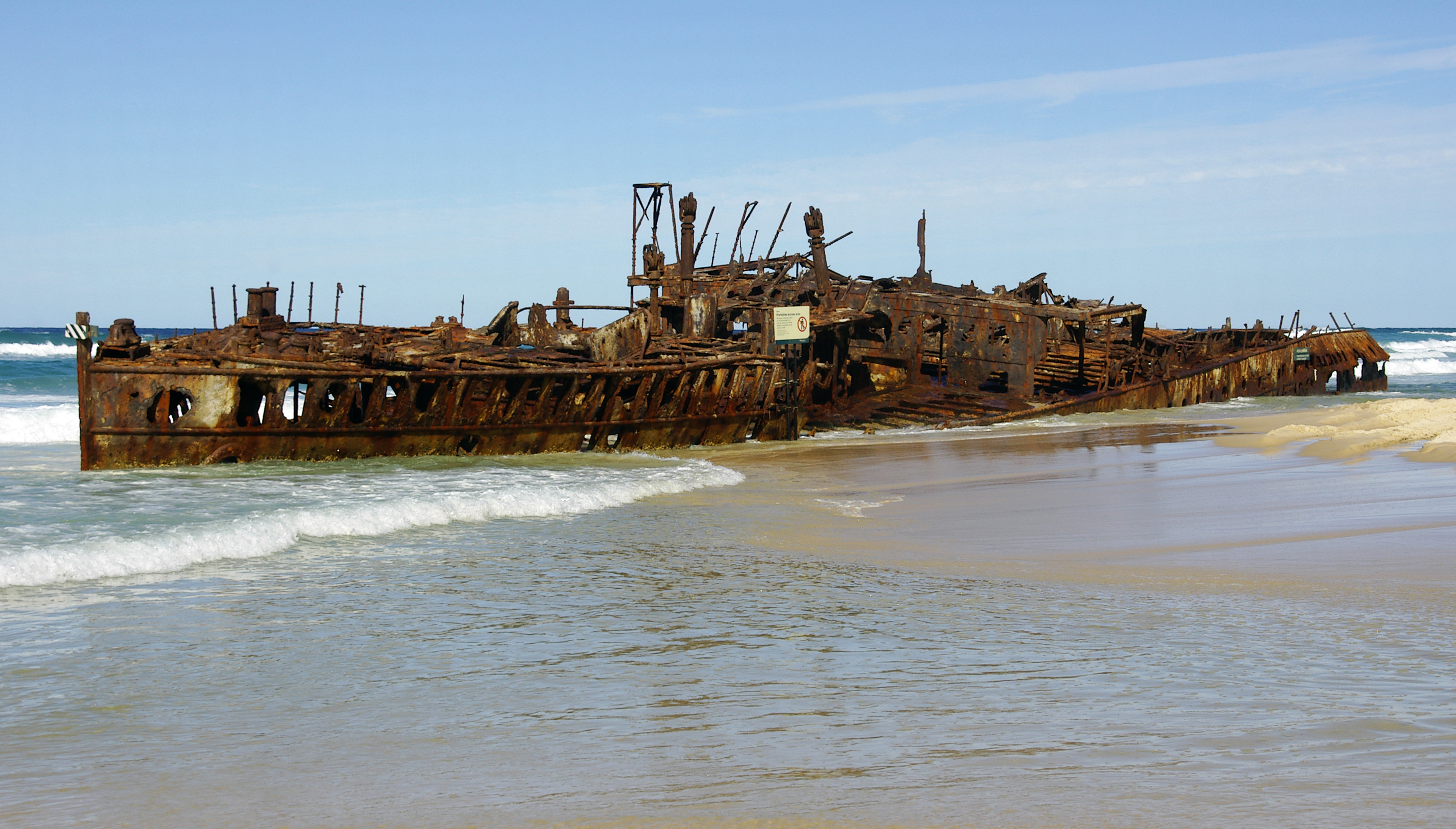
The hulk of Maheno in 2007

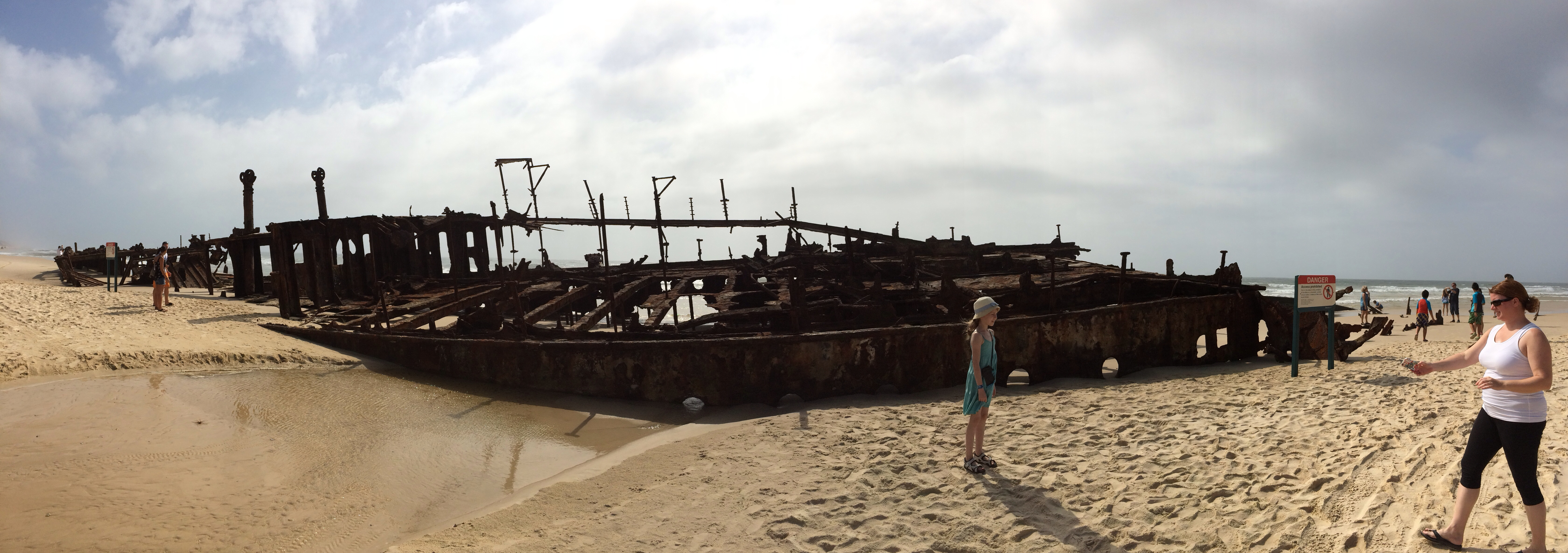
The hulk of Maheno in 2013

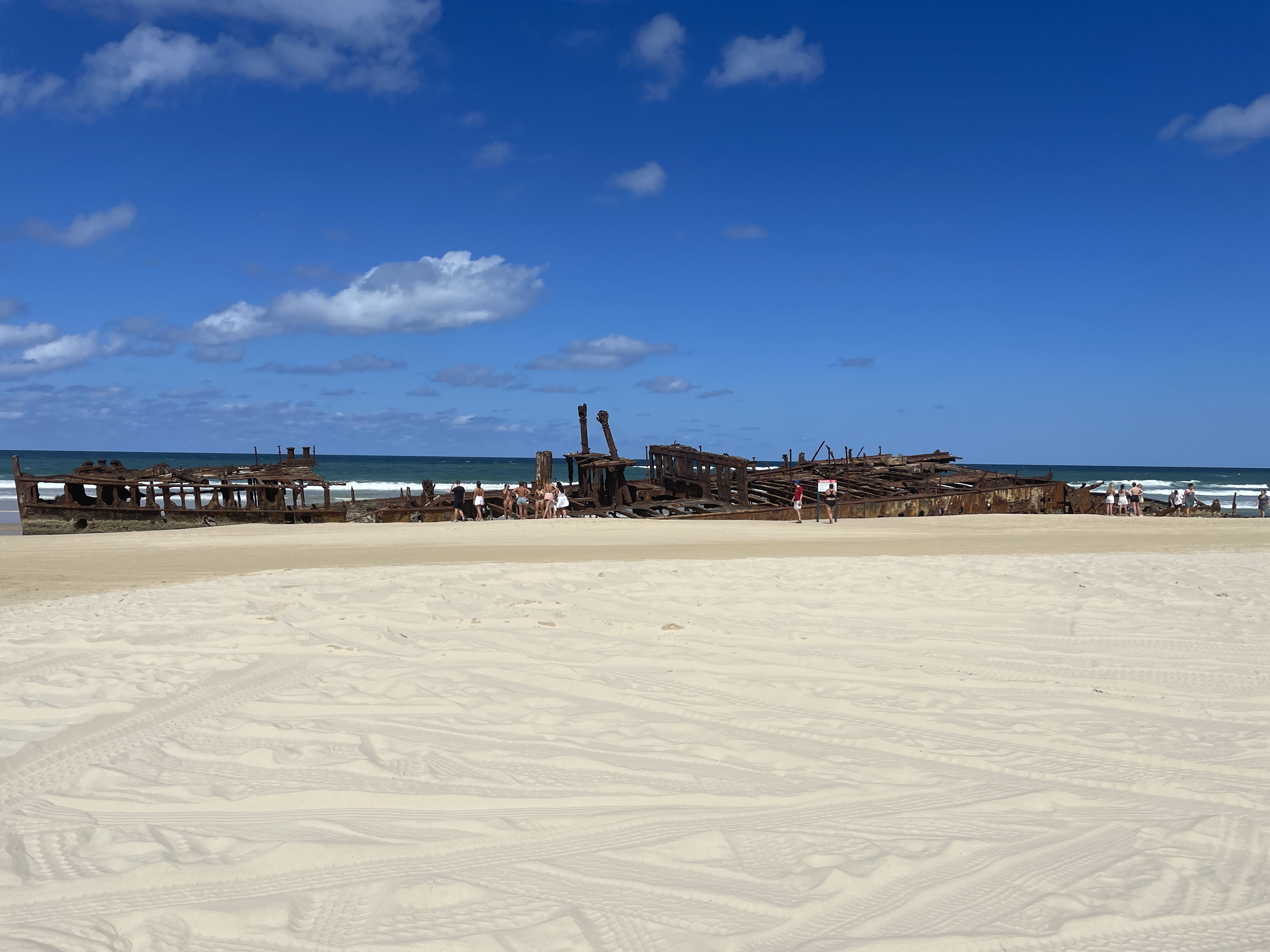
Wreck of Maheno in March 2023

== See also ==
- Charlotte Le Gallais
- SS Marama: sister ship; His Majesty's New Zealand Hospital Ship No. 2.
- List of shipwrecks of Australia
