= SS Marama =

Ocean liner

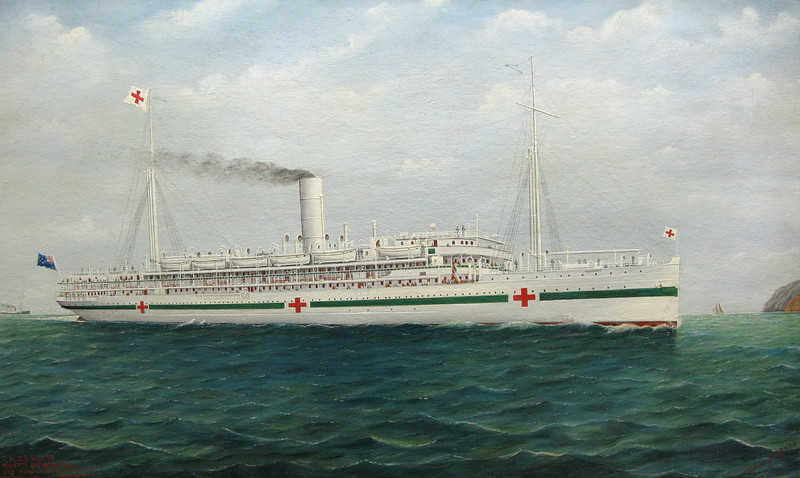
- SS Marama serving as a hospital ship, 1915

History

New Zealand
- Name: SS Marama
- Owner: Union Company, Dunedin
- Port of registry: Wellington
- Route: New Zealand — Australia & Trans-Pacific
- Builder: Caird & Company, Greenock
- Cost: £166,000
- Yard number: 313
- Launched: 1907
- In service: November 1907
- Out of service: 1937
- Identification: Official number: 117,597
- Fate: Broken up,

General characteristics
- Type: Ocean liner
- Tonnage: 6,437 GRT; 3,952 NRT
- Length: 420 ft (130 m)
- Beam: 53.2 ft (16.2 m)
- Depth: 31.2 ft (9.5 m)
- Speed: 17 knots (31 km/h; 20 mph)
- Capacity: 488 passengers: 270 later 242 × 1st class; 120 later 214 × 2nd class; 98 later 32 × fore cabin or Interchange
- Crew: 140

SS Marama was an ocean liner belonging to the Union Company of New Zealand from 1907 to 1937. She was a hospital ship in World War I as His Majesty's New Zealand Hospital Ship No. 2, and remains a symbol of New Zealand's contribution to the war effort.

== History ==
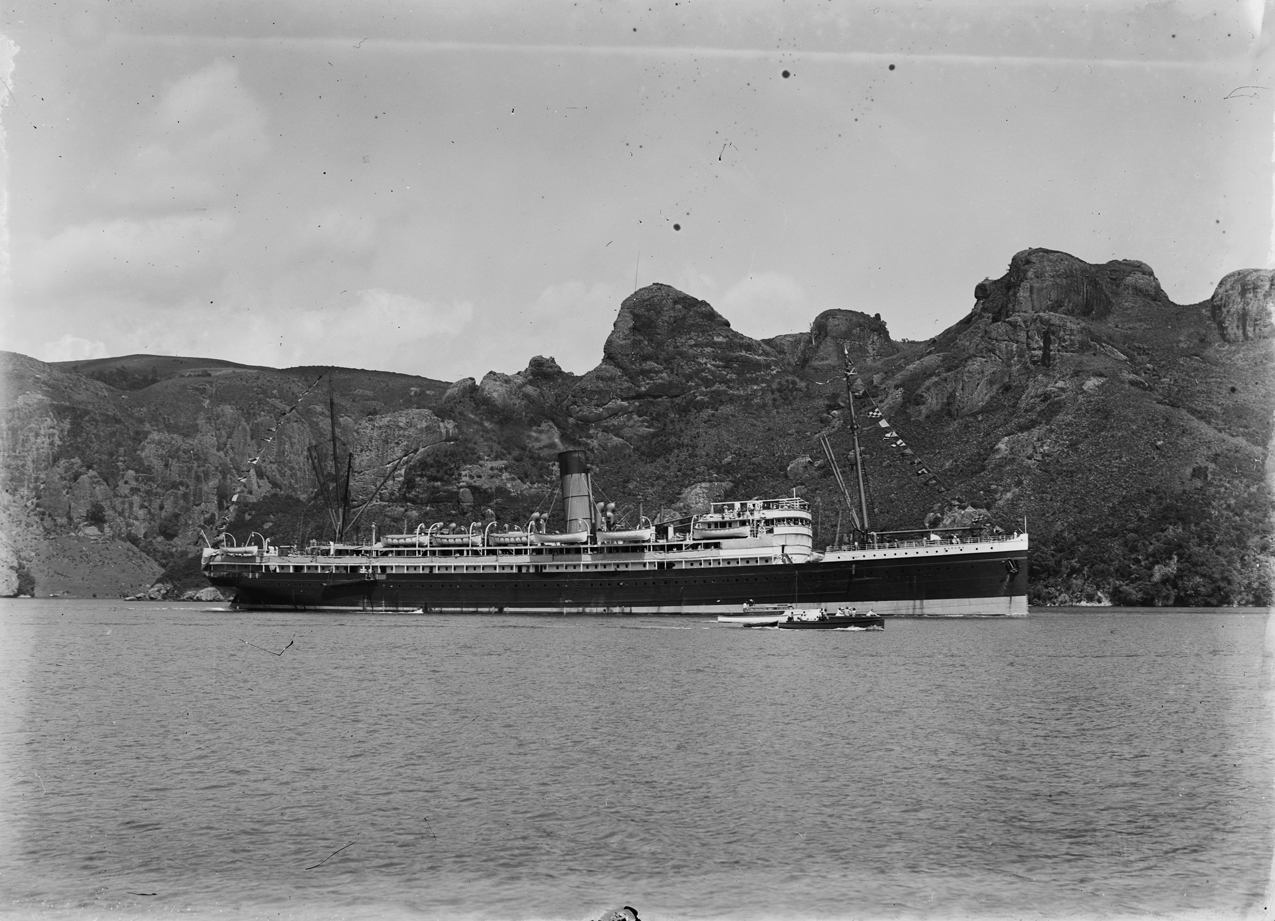
Marama in Union Company livery

Built by Caird & Company at Greenock at a cost of £166,000 ($332,000), Marama arrived at Port Chalmers in November 1907. She was the largest and most powerful ship (though not the fastest) in the USS Co fleet. Initially, she sailed on the Horseshoe run to Australia, and occasionally in transpacific services.

=== Wartime service ===
During World War I, Marama was chartered by the New Zealand Government to serve as a hospital ship for the British Empire. She was renamed His Majesty's New Zealand Hospital Ship No. 2. and given the prefix HMHS (His Majesty's Hospital Ship). The ship was outfitted with a new hospital setup funded through a public fundraising campaign supported by Governor Lord Liverpool. Her livery was also painted white in alignment with the Hague Convention on hospital ships. Her crew consisted of civilian men from the country's merchant navy alongside army medical staff, including female nurses.

Marama carried out four commissions for the NZEF from 1915 to 1919, commanded by Dr P.R Cook, a C.B.E and Lieutenant Colonel in the NZEF. While her sister ship, the SS Maheno, served at Gallipoli, Marama did not reach Europe until after the Allied evacuation of the peninsula. Her primary role during the war was transporting sick and wounded ANZAC soldiers back to Australia and New Zealand, helping to free hospitals and convalescent beds in Britain and Egypt.

In July 1916, she also carried wounded soldiers and German PoWs directly from the trenches during the Battle of the Somme. Sailing undermanned and at times severely over capacity, Marama completed 11 crossings of the heavily mined English Channel, carrying a total of 10,978 personnel. Over the course of the war, Marama’s commissions took her to ports around the world, including locations in Europe, the Middle East, South and Southeast Asia, Central America, and the Pacific.

=== Postwar service ===
After war service, Marama was refitted in 1920 for the transpacific services to San Francisco or Vancouver. In 1925, she was converted to burn oil, and was employed on the Tasman run.

The ship was sold to Shanghai shipbreakers of the Linghua Dock & Engineering Works, Ltd. in 1937, then resold to Kobe shipbreakers Miyachi K.K.K. and was broken up at their Osaka shipyard in 1938.

=== Marama Hall ===
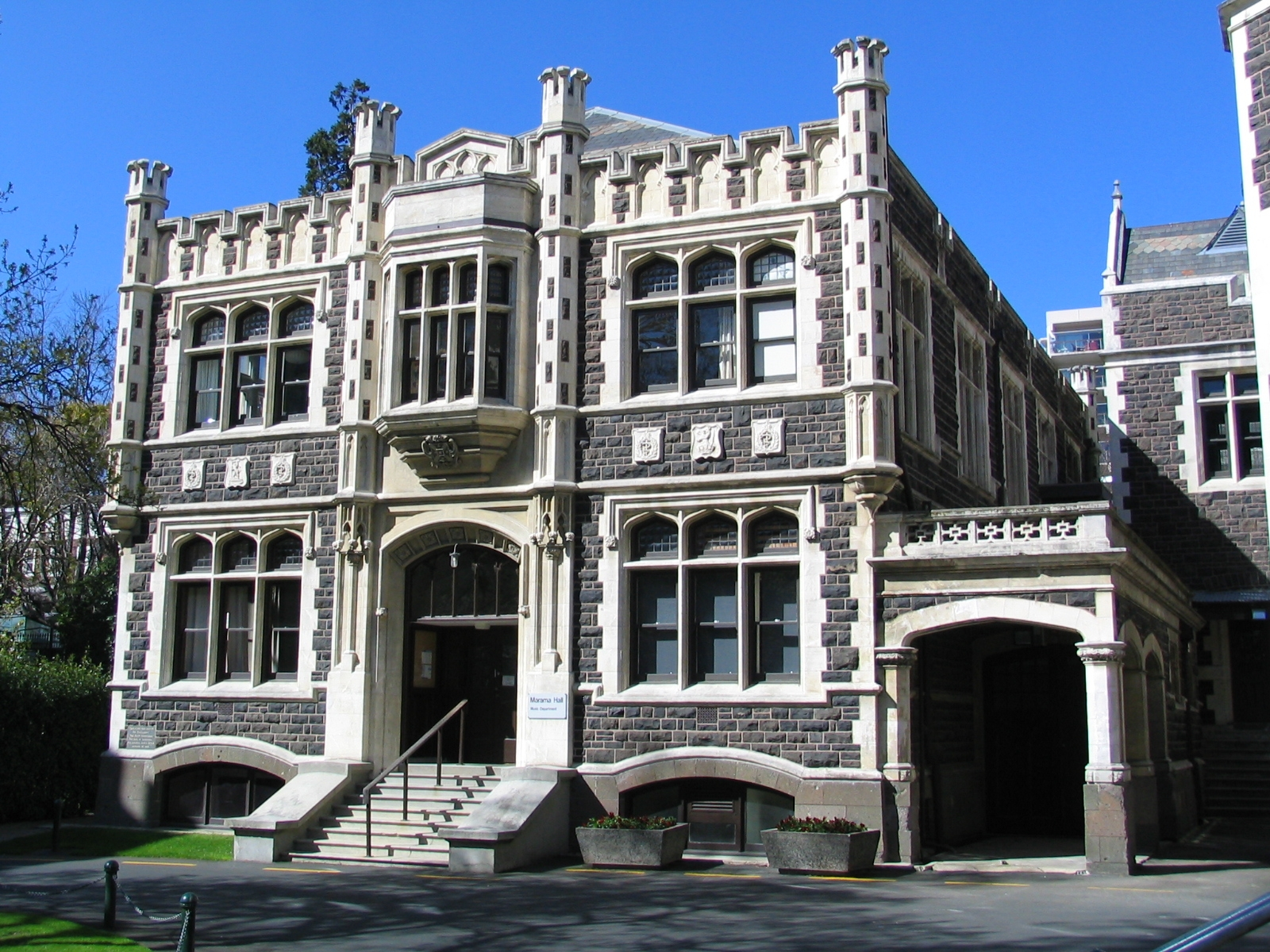
Marama Hall, named after HMHS Marama, at the University of Otago

Marama Hall at the University of Otago is named after the liner, commemorating medical personnel who served aboard the two New Zealand hospital ships in World War I. In 1919, the Ministry of Defence allocated surplus funds from the hospital ship's service to the university for the construction of the hall. Building began the same year, and the hall was completed in 1923 under the architect Edmund Anscombe. It was originally used as a gymnasium and drill hall for medical students, and is now part of the university's School of Performing Arts. Displayed in the hall is a memorial board listing members of New Zealand's Medical and Dental Corps, as well as the New Zealand Army Nursing and Chaplains Department who served during World War I.

== See also ==
- SS Maheno - sister ship; His Majesty's New Zealand Hospital Ship No. 1.
