= Vida MacLean =

New Zealand civilian/military nurse and hospital matron

Vida Mary Katie MacLean
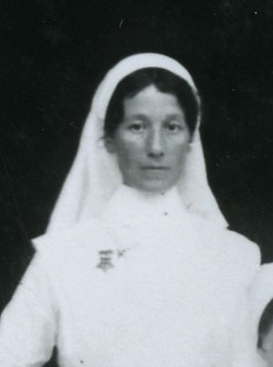
- Born: 4 November 1881; Hunterville New Zealand
- Died: 1 July 1970 (aged 88); Wanganui New Zealand
- Military career
- Allegiance: New Zealand
- Branch: New Zealand Expeditionary Force
- Service number: WWI 22/3, WWI 3/75
- Unit: New Zealand Army Nursing Service
- Conflicts: First World War
- Awards: Royal Red Cross MID

Vida Mary Katie MacLean RRC (4 November 1881 – 1 July 1970) was a New Zealand civilian and military nurse and hospital matron with the New Zealand Army Nursing Service Corps during World War I and the Samoan Expeditionary Forces in 1914.

MacLean was born in Hunterville, New Zealand, on 4 November 1881 to mother Julia Williamson and father Finlay McLean. Her father came from Scotland and bought the Bird Grove farm where MacLean spent her childhood. The MacLean family became the first Pākeha settlers in the area. She completed her nurses training at Whanganui Hospital, passing in December 1909.

== Nursing career ==
MacLean continued to work at Whanganui Hospital until 1910 when she moved to Wellington to undertake midwifery training at St Helens Hospital. She later worked at Te Waikato Sanatorium in Cambridge and then returned to St Helens Hospital where she worked as sub-matron.

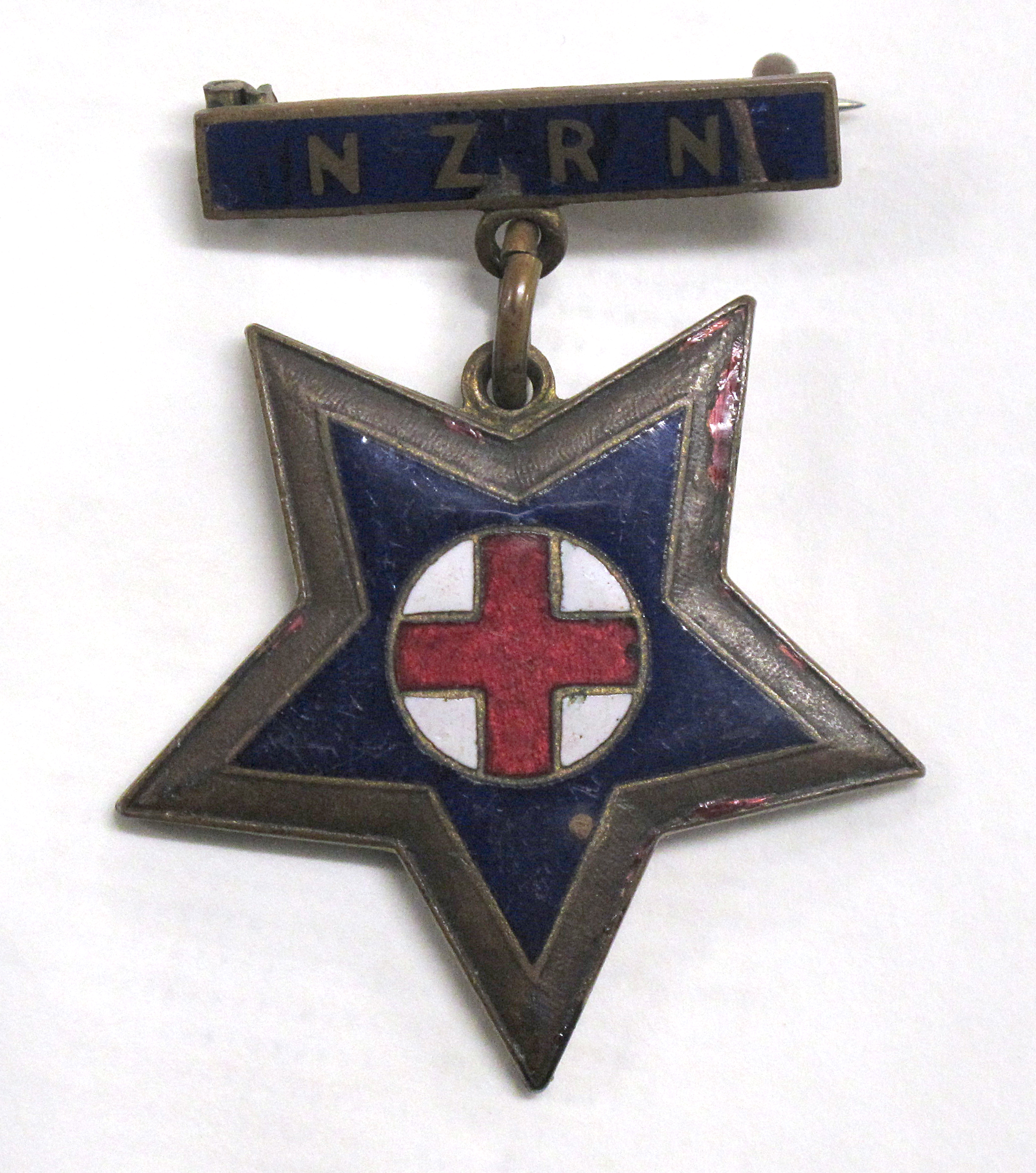
New Zealand Registered Nurse qualification badge presented to Nurse Vida M K MacLean, 1910 (front).

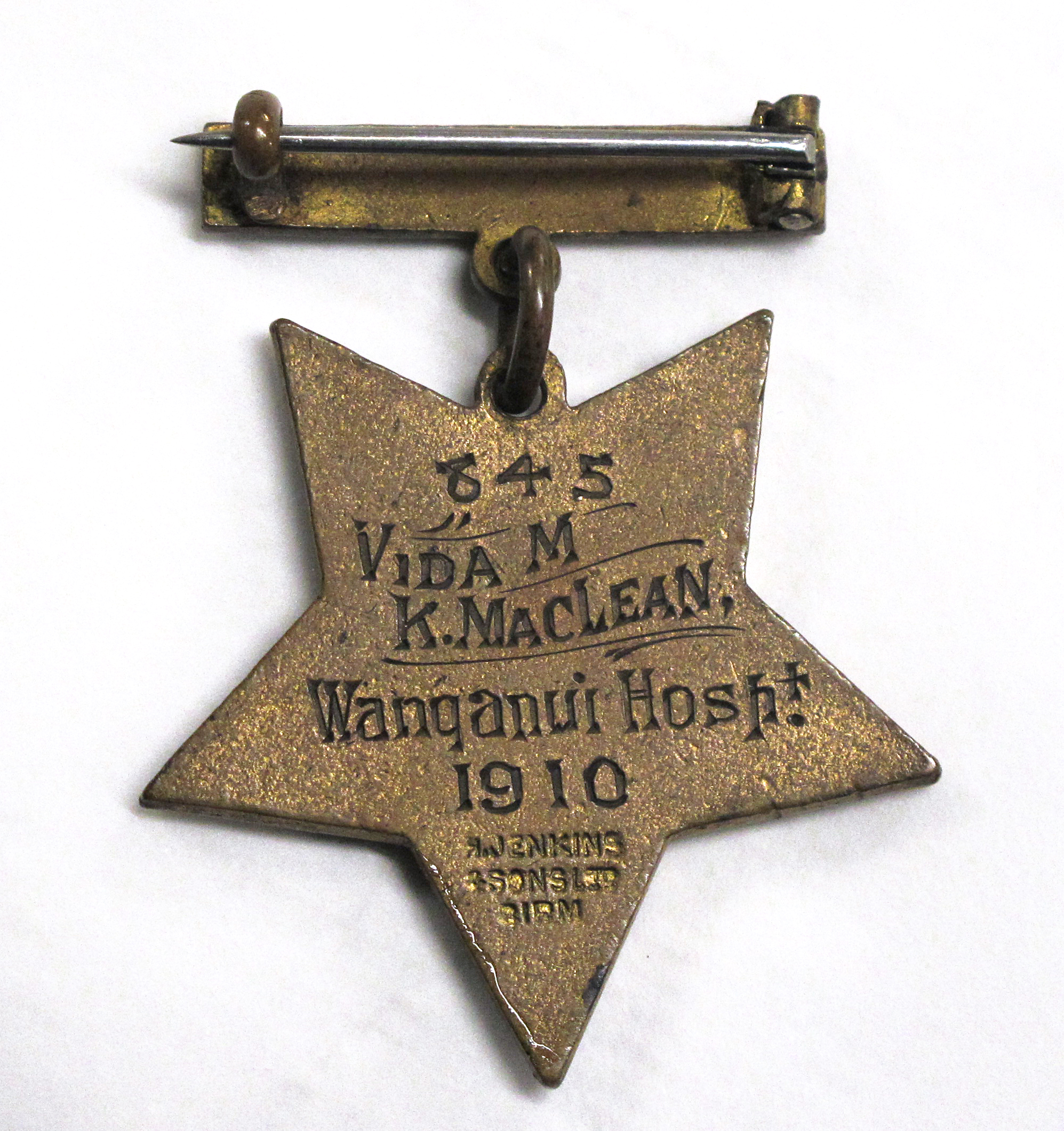
New Zealand Registered Nurse qualification badge presented to Nurse Vida M K MacLean, 1910 (back).

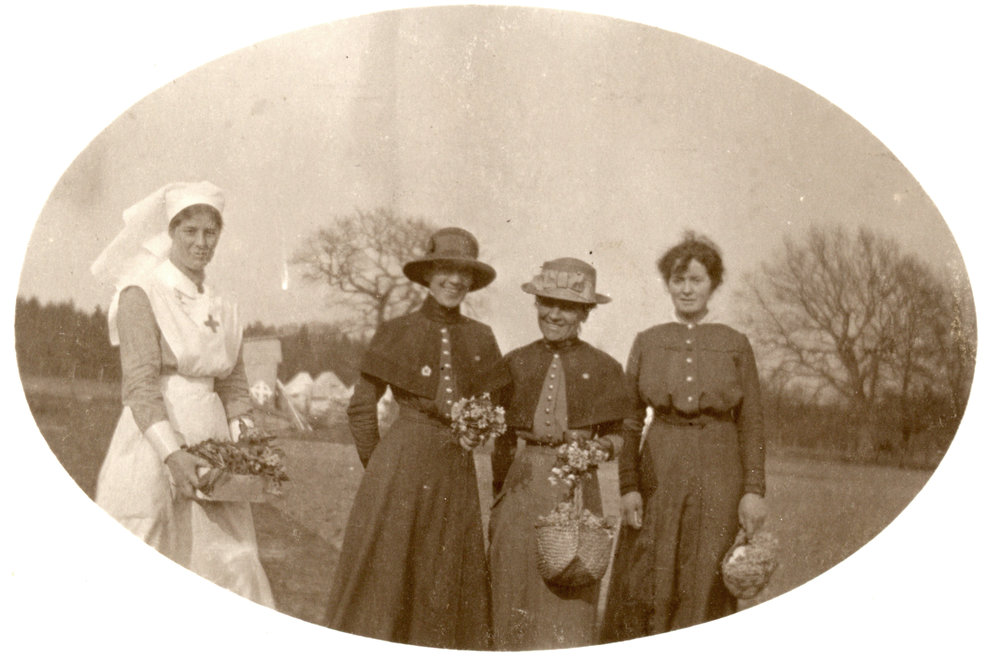
A group of four nurses at Brockenhurst. Matron Vida MacLean, second from the left.

=== New Zealand Expeditionary Force in Samoa ===
From August 1914 to March 1915, MacLean was part of the New Zealand Expeditionary Force that served in German occupied Samoa. The team of nurses were selectedonly three days before embarking, this meant that nurses in Wellington where given priority. She set sail to Apia, Samoa onboard the SS Monowai in August 1914 to replace German nurses.

=== New Zealand Army Nursing Service ===
In 1915 upon the conception of the New Zealand Army Nursing Service, MacLean travelled to Egypt. She worked at the Egyptian Army Hospital, Abbassieh, running the infectious diseases isolation unit. By June 1916, MacLean had been transferred to hospitals in the South of England, the No 1 New Zealand General Hospital in Brockenhurst. MacLean was promoted to matron of the New Zealand Convalescent Hospital in Hornchurch in January 1917 and then matron of the No.1 New Zealand General Hospital in April. She left England in May 1919.

MacLean was awarded a Royal Red Cross, second class in 1916 as well as a 1914-15 Star.

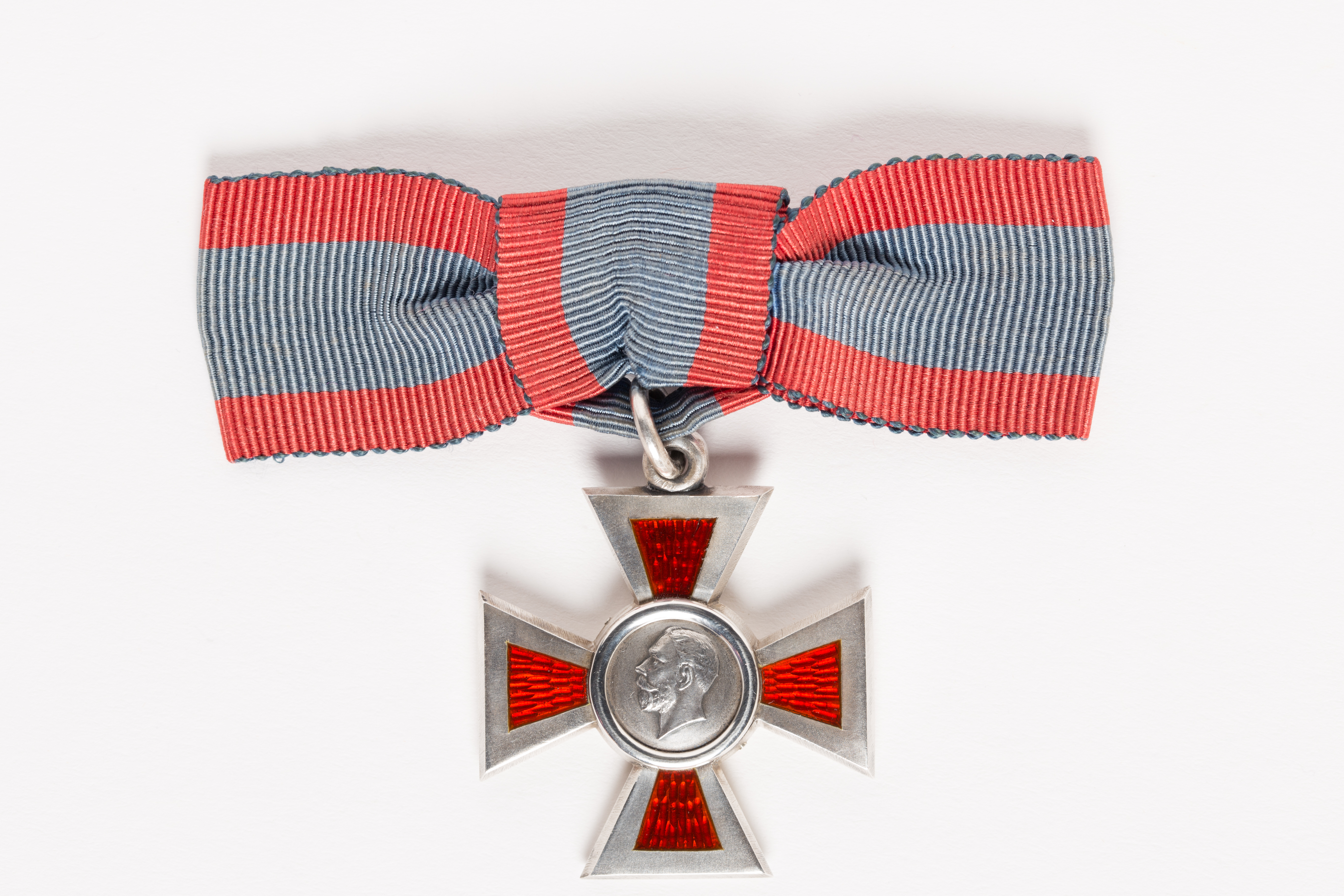
Example of Royal Red Cross, second class. 1916.

=== Post WWI ===
After the war, Mclean became the matron of Trentham Military Hospital until October 1920, then joined Fanny Wilson in managing the Malifa private hospital on Willis Street, Wellington.

MacLean continued work in the healthcare sector, working with the Plunket Society and the Mothercraft Home in Wellington. In 1927 she started work at the Karitane Hospital in Auckland and later moved to Sydney to oversee nurse training and Plunket work. Returning to her old role in Auckland in 1930, MacLean worked at hospitals throughout the Wellington region and then moved to Adelaide where she became the matron at the Truby King Mothercraft Society.

In 1938, MacLean visited India for her work with Plunket to set up a Mothercraft centre, this coincided with the start of World War II, causing MacLean to join to Indian Military Nursing Service, serving in Assam and Jullundur. MacLean remained in India for seventeen years, returning to New Zealand in 1955.

== Personal life ==
MacLean returned to her birthplace, Whanganui, to retire and lived with her sister Edith. Maclean never married, dedicating her life to nursing.

She died in Whanganui Hospital on 1 July 1970 at age 88 and received a full military funeral.
