= Fanny Wilson =

Army nurse, matron (1874–1958)

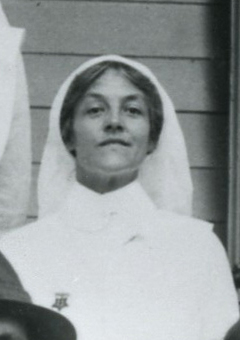
- Born: 25 May 1874; Canterbury, New Zealand
- Died: 11 September 1958 (aged 84); New Zealand
- Military career
- Allegiance: New Zealand
- Branch: New Zealand Expeditionary Force
- Service number: WWI 22/2, WWI 3/77
- Unit: New Zealand Army Nursing Service
- Conflicts: First World War
- Awards: Royal Red Cross

Fanny Maud Wilson RRC (25 May 1874 – 11 September 1958) was a New Zealand army nurse and matron with the New Zealand Army Nursing Service Corps during World War I and the Samoan Expeditionary Forces in 1914.

She was born in Christchurch on 25 May 1874 to mother Mary Jane Whitto and father, Samuel Wilson who both had died by 1895. Wilson became a registered nurse in January 1909.

In 1916 Wilson became Acting Matron at the NZANS convalescent camp at Hornchurch in Essex.

== Nursing career ==
Wilson completed her nursing training at Wellington District Hospital. After becoming a registered nurse, Wilson continued working at Wellington Hospital until 1914 when she joined a contingent of New Zealand nurses heading to German occupied Samoa as part of the New Zealand Expeditionary Force upon the start of World War I.

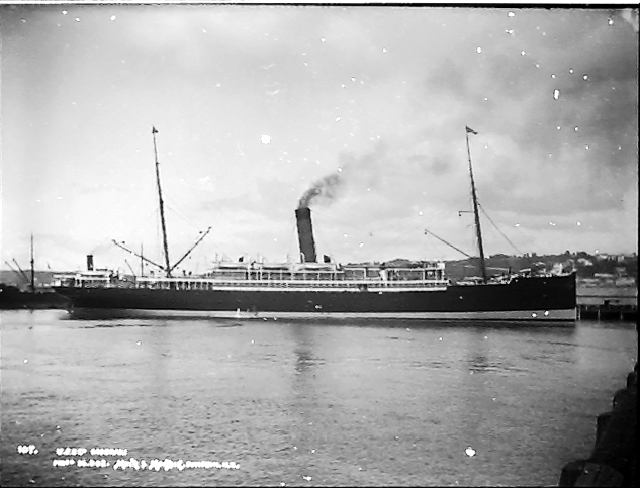
Moeraki, 1905

Wilson sailed on 12 August 1914 to Apia, Samoa onboard the Moeraki. Once returning from Samoa in March 1915, Wilson prepared to set sail with a group of other New Zealand nurses to England in April. Wilson sailed onboard the SS Rotorua, arriving in Plymouth then traveling to Egypt. She arrived in Alexandria on 16 June 1915, to serve as a theatre sister in the No 2 New Zealand Stationary Hospital close to Cairo, which was later in 1916 renamed, No 1 New Zealand General Hospital.

=== After WWI ===
After serving in the Gallipoli campaign, Wilson worked in various military hospitals in England where she became matron. After the war ended in 1918, Wilson moved back to Wellington, New Zealand and managed the Willis Street, Malfia private hospital in Wellington with fellow nurse, Vida MacLean. She later worked at St Helens Hospital in Christchurch then matron at The Limes Hospital until her retirement in 1937.

=== Awards ===
Wilson was awarded a Royal Red Cross, second class in 1917 and Royal Red Cross, first class for her service during World War I.

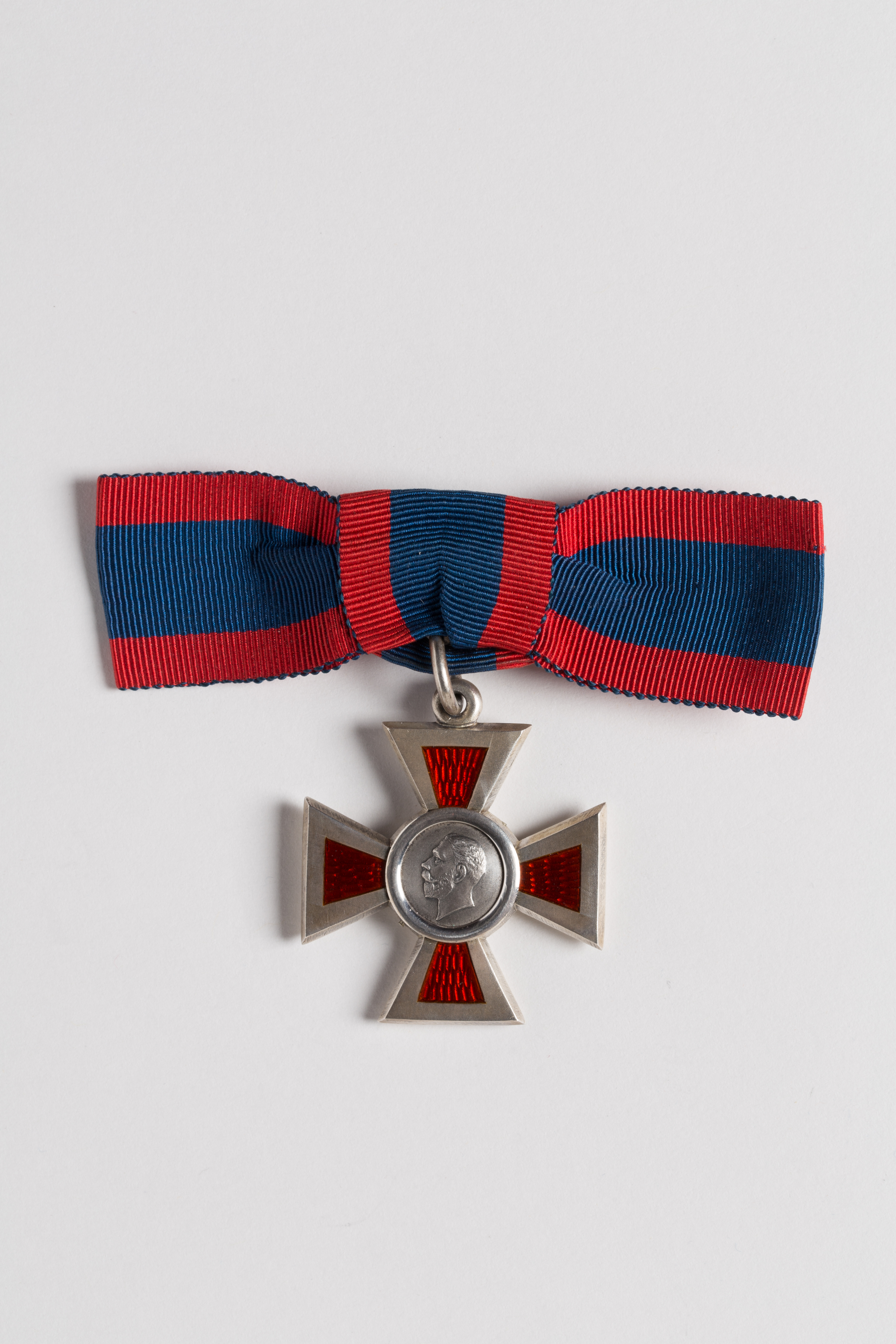
Example of Royal Red Cross, second class (front)

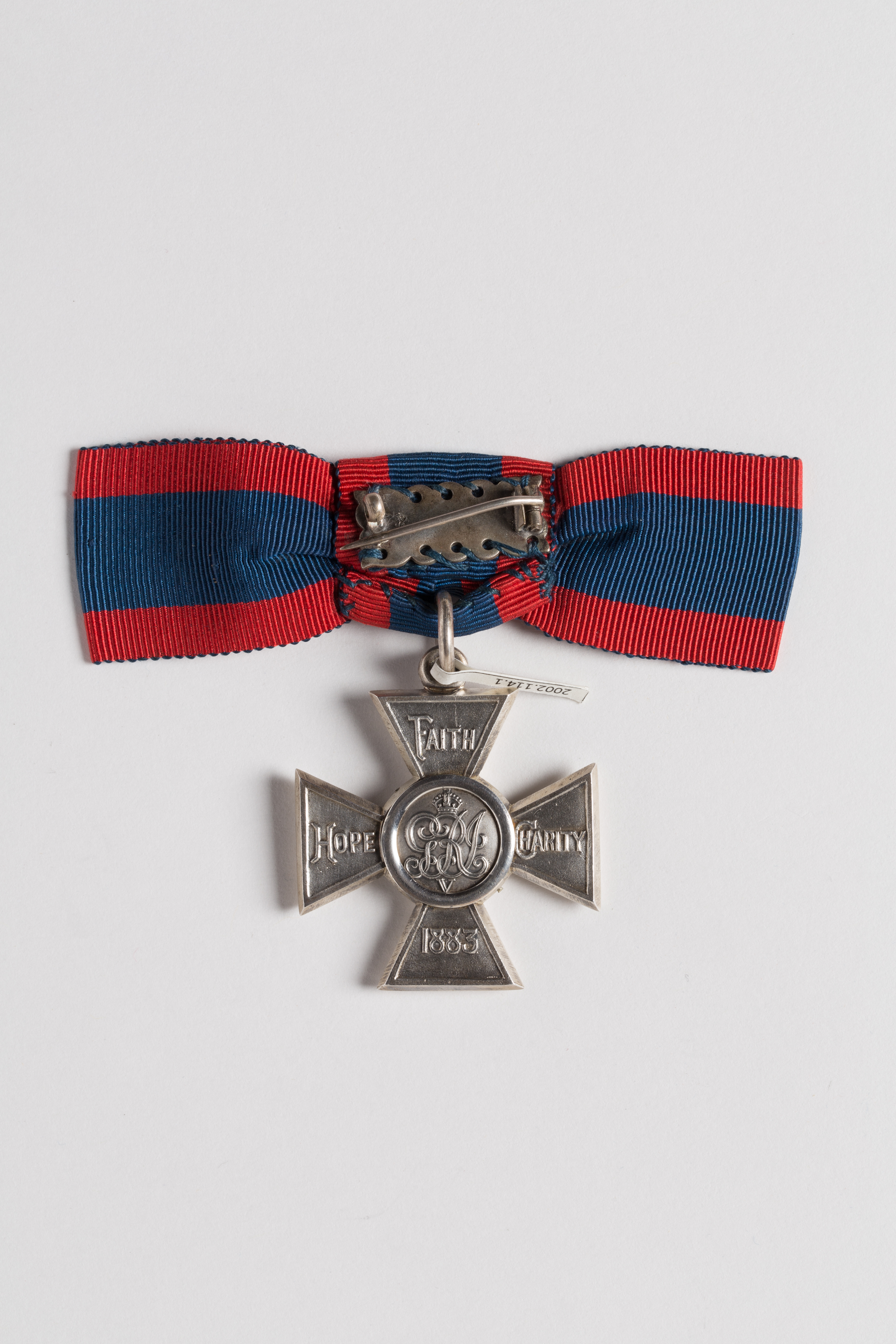
Example of Royal Red Cross, second class (back)

== Personal life ==
Wilson had two siblings, sister, Susan Wilson (born 1871) and brother Samuel Frederick Wilson (born 1878). She never married.

Wilson died on 11 September 1958 in Christchurch at age 84.
