= List of nurses who died in World War I =

An estimated 1,500 nurses from a number of countries lost their lives during World War I. Some died from disease or accidents, and some from enemy action.

== Australia ==
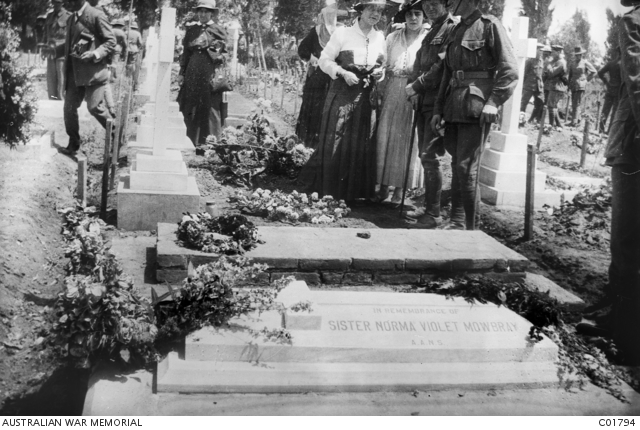
Grave of Nurse Norma Mowbray, Cairo, 1916

29 Australian nurses died from disease or injuries; 25 of these died on active service, and 4 died in Australia from injuries or illness sustained during their service. Most of these nurses were serving in the Australian Army Nursing Service; however, a small number were serving with Queen Alexandra's Imperial Military Nursing Service, one of a number of British Army nursing services during World War I. Other Australian women made their own way to Europe and joined the British Red Cross, private hospitals or other allied services.

=== Nurses serving with the Australian Army Nursing Service ===
Name	Date of death	Circumstances of death	Place of death
Louisa Bicknell	25 June 1915	Sepsis poisoning	Cairo, Egypt
Kathleen Brennan	24 November 1918	Spanish flu	Leicester, England
Emily Clare	17 October 1918	Pneumonia	India
Ruby Dickinson	23 June 1918	Pneumonia	United Kingdom
May Hennessy	9 April 1919	Malaria	Bendigo, Australia
Hilda Knox	17 February 1917	Meningitis	France
Irene McPhail	4 August 1920	Tuberculosis	Melbourne, Australia
Edith Moorhouse	24 November 1918	Illness	France
Norma Mowbray	21 January 1916	Pneumonia	Cairo, Egypt
Gertrude Munro	10 September 1918	Pneumonia and malaria	Greece
Letitia Moreton	11 November 1916	Enteric fever (typhoid)	India
Lily Nugent	21 February 1918	Phthisis (tuberculosis)	Sydney, Australia
Amy O'Grady	12 August 1916	Cholera	Bombay (Mumbai), India
Rosa O'Kane	21 December 1918	Spanish flu	Perth, Australia
Katherine Porter	16 July 1919	Pneumonia	Sydney, Australia
Kathleen Power	13 August 1916	Illness	India
Doris Ridgway	6 January 1919	Pneumonia	Perth, Australia
Elizabeth Rothery	15 June 1918	Illness	Beechworth, Australia
Mary Stafford	20 March 1919	Leukemia	Torrens Park, Australia
Ada Thompson	1 January 1919	Spanish flu	Perth, Australia
Fanny Tyson	20 April 1919	Illness	Sutton Veny, England
Jean Miles-Walker	30 October 1918	Pneumonia	Sutton Veny, England
Beatrice Watson	2 June 1916	Illness	Suez, Egypt

=== Nurses serving with Queen Alexandra's Imperial Military Nursing Service Reserve ===
Name	Date of death	Circumstances of death	Place of death
Charlotte Berrie	8 January 1919	Pneumonia	Jerusalem
Narrelle Hobbes	10 May 1918	Liver cancer	At sea
Myrtle Wilson	23 December 1915	Pneumonia	France
Edith Blake	26 February 1918	drowned after hospital ship torpedoed	English Channel

=== Volunteers serving with the Australian Red Cross ===
Name	Date of death	Circumstances of death	Place of death
Louisa Riggall	31 August 1918	Haemorrhage	France

== Canada ==
53 Canadian nurses lost their lives during the war. In one incident, on 27 June 1918, 14 nurses were killed when their hospital ship HMHS Llandovery Castle was torpedoed while travelling from Halifax, Nova Scotia, to Liverpool, England. The nurses who died were:

- Mary Agnes McKenzie.^{[12]}
- Christina Campbell.^{[13]}
- Carola Josephine Douglas.^{[14]}
- Alexina Dussault.^{[14]}
- Minnie Aenath Follette.^{[14]}
- Margaret Jane Fortescue.^{[14]}
- Minnie Katherine Gallaher.^{[14]}
- Jessie Mabel McDiarmid.^{[14]}
- Rena McLean.^{[14]}
- Mary Belle Sampson.^{[14]}
- Gladys Irene Sare.^{[14]}
- Anna Irene Stamers.^{[15]}
- Jean Templeman.^{[15]}

== Netherlands ==
Rosa Vecht (18 July 1881 – 23 January 1915) died when she was injured by shrapnel at Veurne in West Flanders, while saying goodbye before a planned evacuation. She died after an operation to amputate her leg.

== New Zealand ==
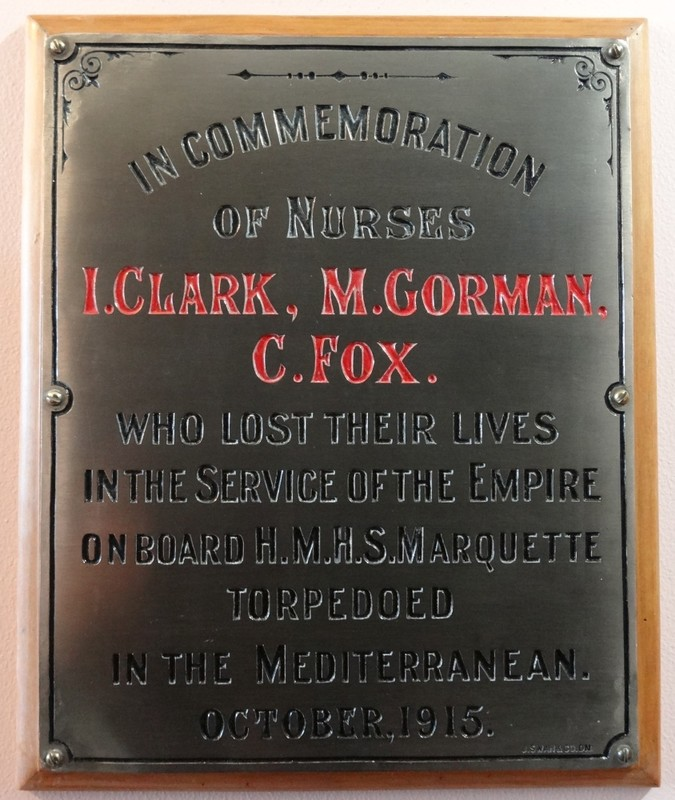
Plaque at Waimate Hospital to nurses who died on the SS Marquette

16 New Zealand nurses died during the war, including 10 who died in the sinking of the troop ship SS Marquette.

Name	Date of death	Circumstances of death	Place of death
Marion Brown	23 October 1915	Drowned in the sinking of the SS Marquette	Aegean Sea
Isabel Clark	23 October 1915	Drowned in the sinking of the SS Marquette	Aegean Sea
Ella Cooke	8 September 1917	Hit by a train	Alexandria, Egypt
Catherine Fox	23 October 1915	Drowned in the sinking of the SS Marquette	Aegean Sea
Mary Gorman	23 October 1915	Drowned in the sinking of the SS Marquette	Aegean Sea
Ada Gilbert Hawken	28 October 1915	Enteric fever (typhoid)	Alexandria, Egypt
Nona Hildyard	23 October 1915	Drowned in the sinking of the SS Marquette	Aegean Sea
Helena Isdell	23 October 1915	Drowned in the sinking of the SS Marquette	Aegean Sea
Mabel Jamieson	23 October 1915	Drowned in the sinking of the SS Marquette	Aegean Sea
Elise Kemp	20 October 1917	Killed when a German aircraft bombed the field hospital she was in	Flanders, France
Lily Lind	21 November 1916	Tuberculosis, contracted while nursing	At sea, on board SS Maheno
Mary Rae	23 October 1915	Drowned in the sinking of the SS Marquette	Aegean Sea
Lorna Rattray	23 October 1915	Drowned in the sinking of the SS Marquette	Aegean Sea
Margaret Rogers	23 October 1915	Drowned in the sinking of the SS Marquette	Aegean Sea
Esther Maude Tubman	18 September 1918	Cerebrospinal meningitis	Salisbury Hospital, United Kingdom
Mabel Whishaw	10 November 1918	Influenza	Featherson Camp, New Zealand

== Romania ==
Ecaterina Teodoroiu was a Romanian nurse who enlisted as a soldier and died on 3 September 1917 during active service.

== United Kingdom ==
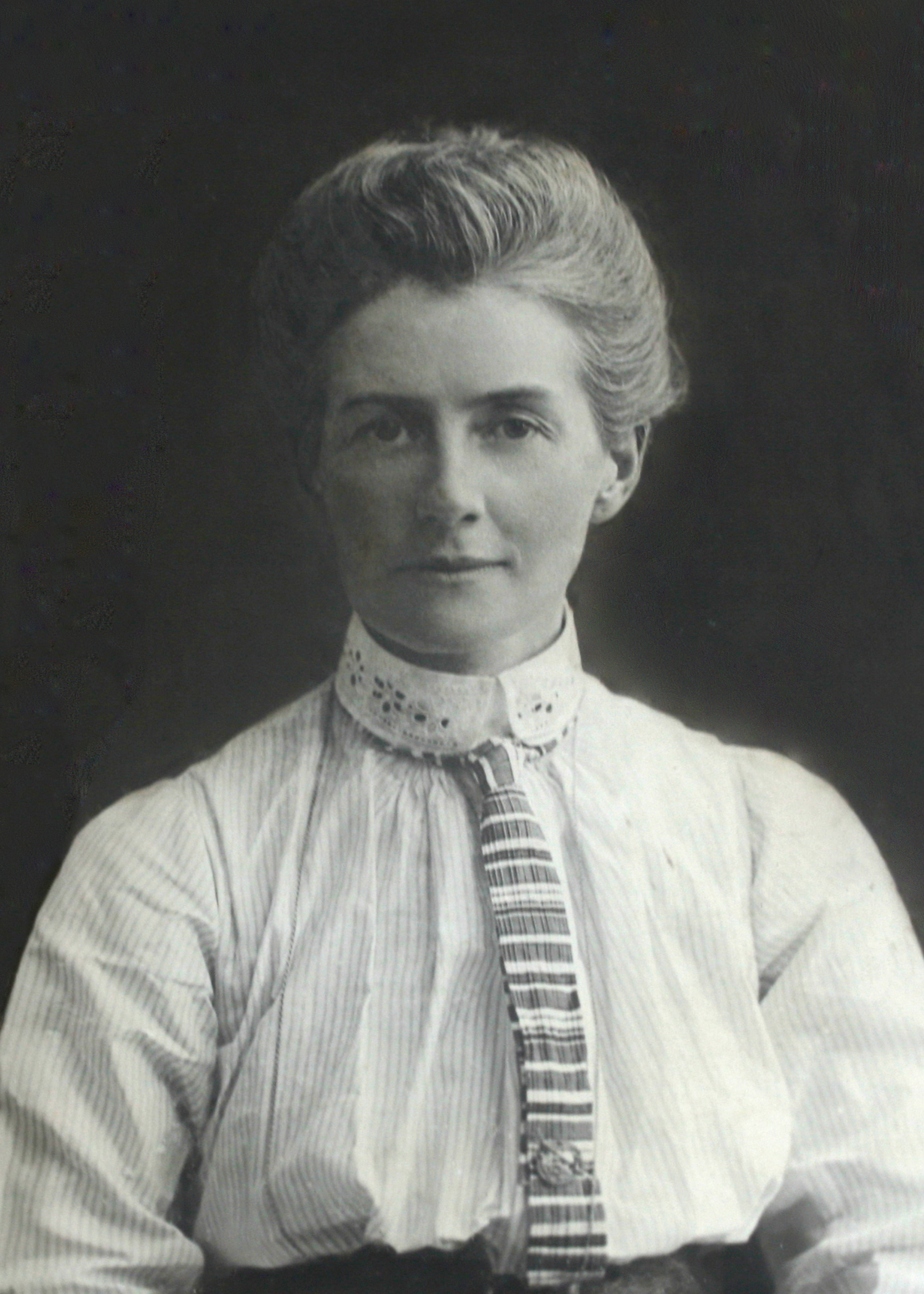
Edith Cavell

The National Memorial Arboretum has a memorial to nurses who served in the first and Second World Wars. The memorial includes the names of nearly 1,300 nurses who died during or as a direct result of their wartime service. The names were taken from research carried out by Yvonne McEwen. McEwen created rolls of honour for the two wars, and deposited copies in national libraries in Edinburgh, Aberystwyth, Belfast, Dublin and London. The London copy is on permanent display in the Royal College of Nursing Library and can be accessed by appointment.

Most nurses were part of the Queen Alexandra's Imperial Military Nursing Service (QAIMNS). At the start of the war there were fewer than 300 nurses; four years later when the war ended it had over 10,000 nurses in its ranks. According to the British Red Cross, "128 nursing members, 11 general service members and six Joint War Committee hospital members were killed."

Edith Cavell was executed for treason by a German firing squad on 12 October 1915 in Brussels, Belgium.

Marjory Eva May Edwards served for three and a half years in Britain and France and died of measles in England on 4 January 1918. Her name is listed on the village war memorial at St Mary's Church at Streatley, Berkshire.

Catherine Miller was working at the 1st Western General Hospital in Liverpool, England when she died on 24 December 1918. She had contracted malaria while serving in Russia.

=== Scottish nurses ===
An estimated 150 British nurses were killed during World War 1. Of those killed 40 were Scottish. Four of the nurses were killed by enemy action including Agnes Murdoch Climie, a staff nurse who trained at the Glasgow Royal Infirmary. Miss Climie was a member of the Territorial Force Nursing Service and based at a general hospital in France while she was on the staff of the 4th Scottish General Hospital, Stobhill. Miss Climie was not on duty during the bombardment but returned to her ward and was killed while singing to a patient who was nervous. Miss Climie was killed instantly while in the same incident Sister Mabel Milne of Perth, who trained at Edinburgh Royal Infirmary and was attached to the 2nd Scottish General Hospital died a short time after being wounded. Two Voluntary Aid Detachments (VADs), Miss Daisie Coles (2nd Scottish Hospital) and Miss E Thompson (1st Scottish Hospital) were also killed.

Three Scottish nurses drowned while serving on hospital ships during WW1. A further 33 Scottish nurses died from diseases acquired while on military service. Two nurses were members of the regular Military Nursing Service and the others were members of the Queen Alexandra’s Imperial Military Nursing Service Reserve and the Territorial Force Nursing Service.

In March 1915, four Scottish nurses died in Serbia of typhus. They were part of a group of Scottish women – nurses, doctors and volunteers – who had travelled to Serbia to establish Scottish Women's Hospitals for Foreign Service:

- Margaret Neill Fraser
- Louisa Jordan
- Augusta Minshull
- Bessie Sutherland

A memorial with the names of the 40 Scottish nurses killed in WW1 was erected by members of the Military Nursing Service, and unveiled at the Cathedral of St Giles in Edinburgh in 1921. The memorial is a bronze tablet set in green marble.

=== HMT Osmanieh sinking, 1917 ===
On 31 December 1917, the British troop ship HMS Osmanieh (1906) struck a mine near the entrance to Alexandria Harbour. The ship sank in under 10 minutes and almost 200 service personnel died. Among the dead were eight nurses. Two of them belonged to the Queen Alexandria’s Imperial Military Nursing Service (QAIMNS):

- Nellie Hawley
- Dorothea Roberts

and the rest belonged to the Voluntary Aid Detachment (VAD):

- Gertrude Bytheway
- Una Duncanson
- Lilian Midwood
- Hermione Rogers
- Catherine Ball
- Winifred Brown

=== Five Sisters memorial ===
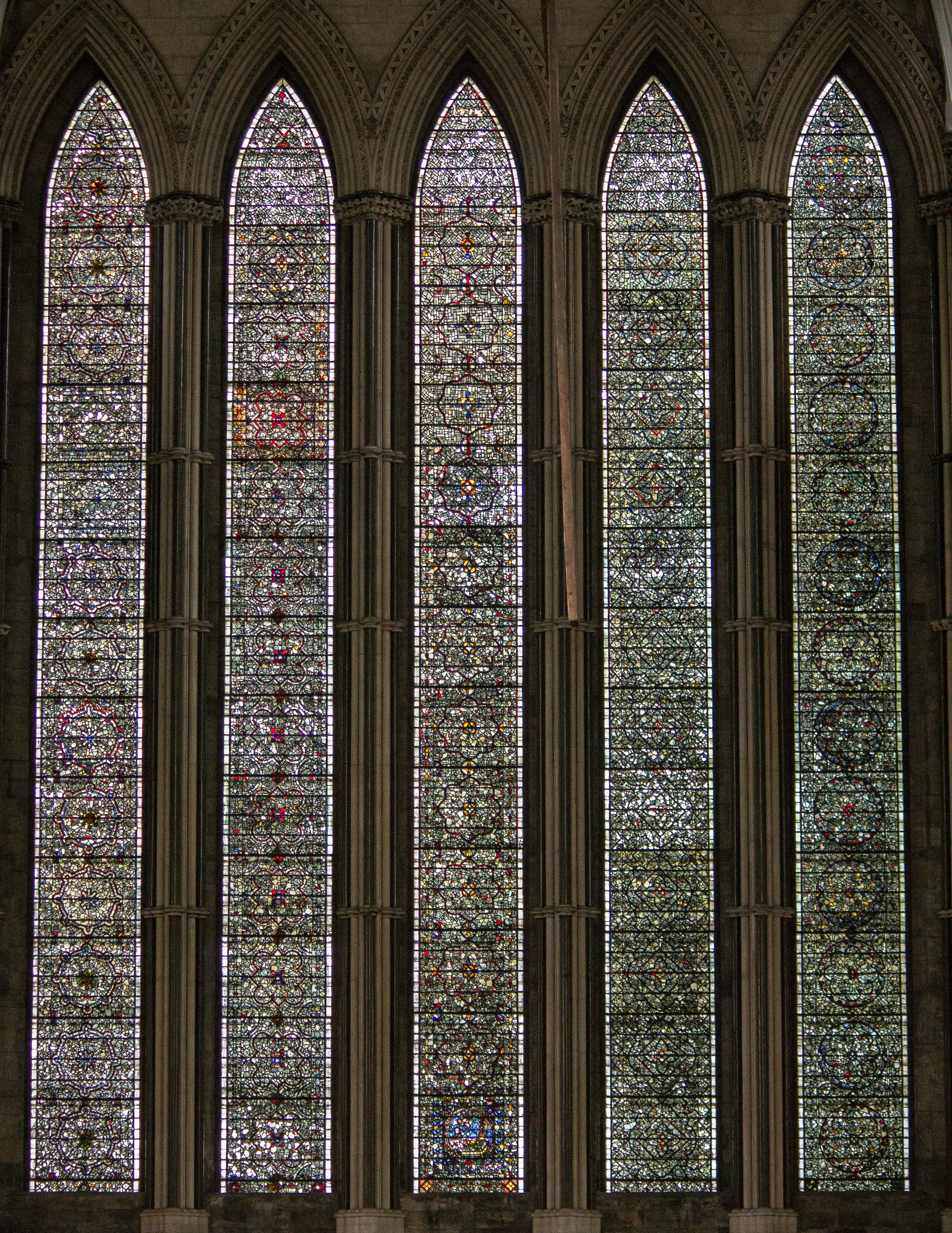
Five Sisters Window, York Minster

York Minster's Five Sisters window is the only memorial in the UK dedicated to all the women of the British Empire who lost their lives in World War I. Ten oak screens were added to the north side of the St Nicholas Chapel. They list the name of every woman who died in the line of service during WWI. An inscription thereon reads, “This screen records the names of women of the Empire who gave their lives in the war 1914–1918 to whose memory the Five Sisters window was restored by women”. There are 1,513 names listed on the screens.

== United States ==
Nurses Clara Ayres and Helen Burnett Wood were the first two women to be killed while part of the United States military when they died on 17 May 1917, following an accident on board USS Mongolia.

Helen Fairchild died in France on 18 January 1918, from post-operative complications following surgery for an ulcer.

Lucy Nettie Fletcher (1886–1918) was the first Red Cross nurse in General Pershing's army to die in the performance of duty.
