= Isabel Clark (nurse) =

New Zealand nurse (1885–1915)

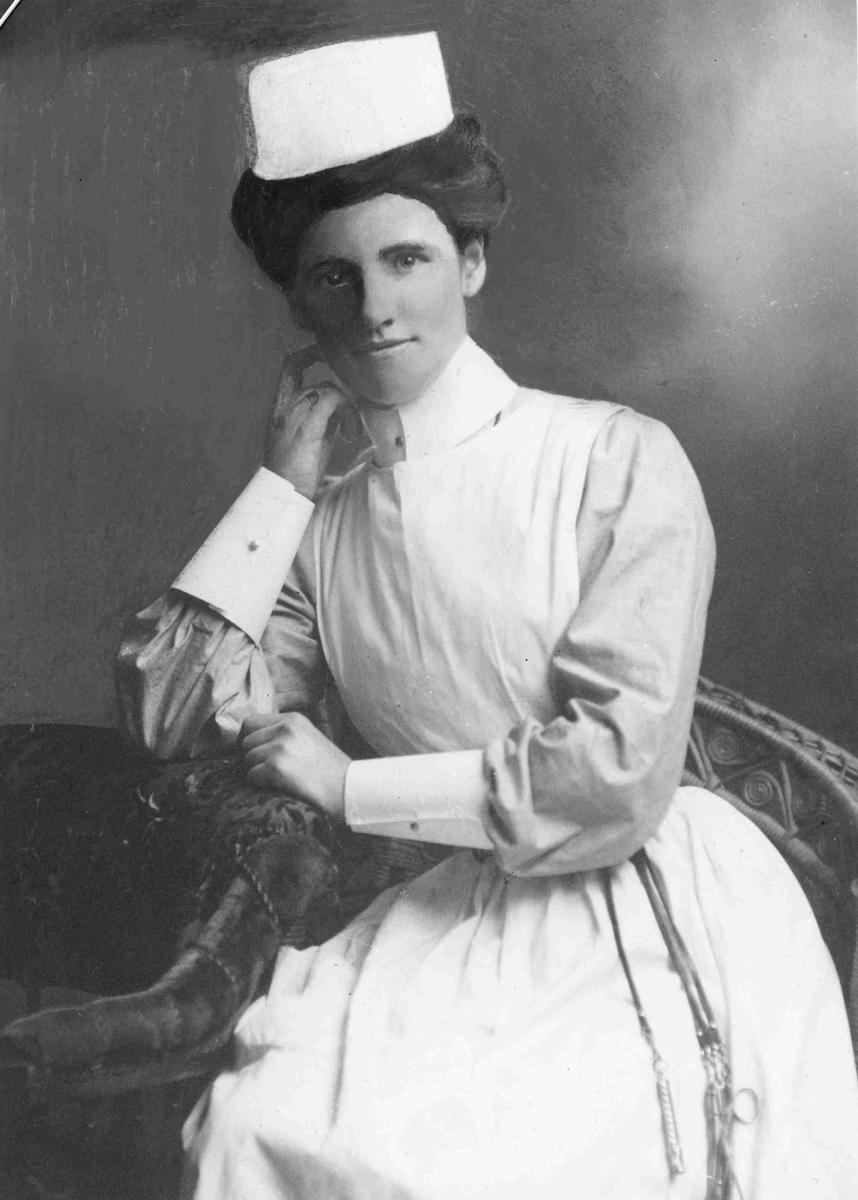
- Born: 1885
- Died: 1915 October
- Cause of death: Sinking of SS Marquette
- Occupation: Nurse

Isabel Clark (1885 – 23 October 1915) was a New Zealand nurse who served in the First World War and died when the SS Marquette was torpedoed and sunk in 1915.

== Early life ==
Clark was born in 1885, the youngest of six children born to Christina and Hugh Clark. Her parents were Scottish settlers and the family lived at Ardgowan, near Oamaru, in the South Island of New Zealand. She attended Oamaru South School and Waitaki Girls' High School. She completed her nursing training at Waimate Hospital and Oamaru Hospital. After qualifying, Clark was a nurse at a private hospital in Auckland.

== First World War ==
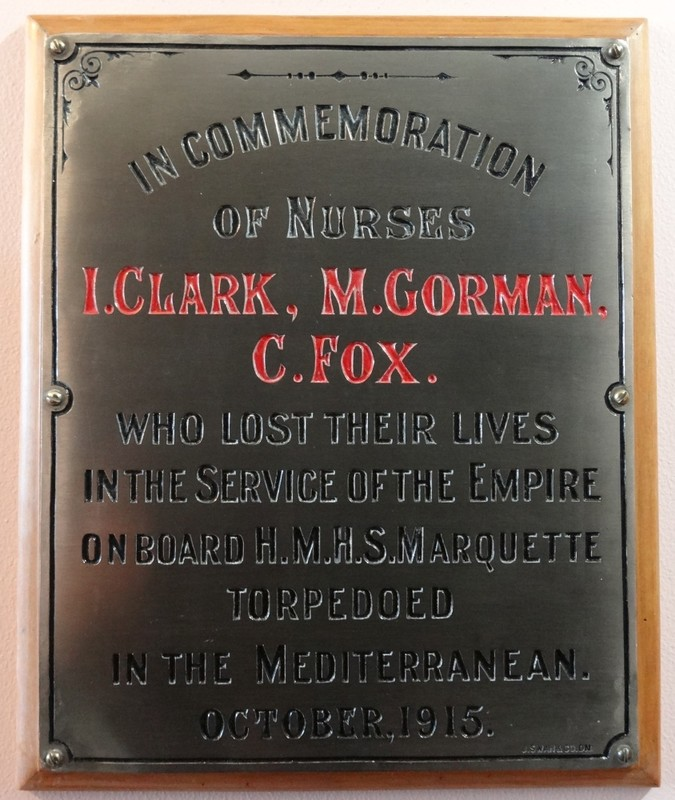
Waimate Hospital plaque to nurses who died on the SS Marquette

In 1915, Clark enlisted in the New Zealand Army Nursing Service for service in the First World War. She left Wellington on board the SS Maheno and sailed to Port Said, Egypt. She joined a contingent of nurses working in a stationary hospital there. In October 1915 Clark was on board the SS Marquette when it was torpedoed by a German submarine and sunk. Survivors reported that Clark and fellow nurse Marion Brown comforted each other on the deck of the ship before holding hands and leaping into the sea together. Neither Clark nor Brown was seen again.

=== Recognition ===
A commemorative plaque to Clark, and fellow Marquette casualties Mary Gorman and Catherine Fox, was placed in Waimate Hospital. When the hospital closed in 1996, the plaque was moved to a display at the Waimate Museum.

A memorial oak tree was planted in Oamaru. There are also plaques at the Oamaru Hospital, Ardgowan School and Waitaki Girls' High School. Waitaki Girls' holds an annual essay writing competition in her name.

Clark is named on the Mikra British Cemetery in Greece and in the Nurses' Memorial Chapel at Christchurch Hospital. She is also remembered in the Five Sisters window at York Minster in York, England.
