= Mary Gorman =

New Zealand nurse (1881–1915)

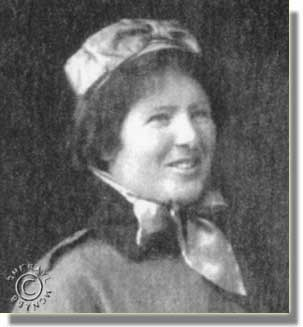
- Born: 10 May 1881
- Died: 23 October 1915 (aged 34)
- Cause of death: Sinking of SS Marquette
- Occupation: Nurse

Mary Gorman (10 May 1881 – 23 October 1915) was a New Zealand nurse who served in World War I and died when the SS Marquette was torpedoed and sunk in 1915.

== Early life ==
Gorman was born in Waimate, New Zealand, on 10 May 1881 to John and Catherine Gorman. Her father was a railway worker. Gorman completed her nursing training at Waimate Hospital.

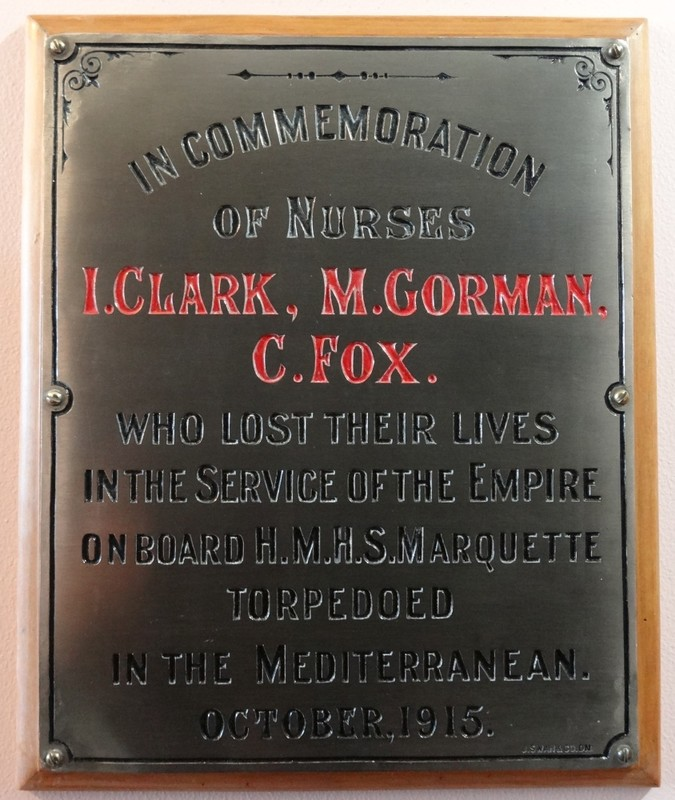
Waimate Hospital plaque to nurses who died on the SS Marquette

== Career ==
After qualifying, Gorman nursed at Wellington Public Hospital. In 1915, she enlisted in the New Zealand Army Nursing Service and left Wellington in May that year on board the SS Marama. The ship sailed to Sydney, and then to Egypt. The contingent of nurses worked in a stationary hospital there. In October 1915 Gorman was on board the SS Marquette when it was torpedoed by a German submarine and sunk. She was injured during the launching of the lifeboats, and realising that she was unlikely to survive, gave her lifebelt to another nurse.

=== Recognition ===
A commemorative plaque to Gorman, and fellow Marquette casualties Catherine Fox and Isabel Clark, was placed in Waimate Hospital. The hospital also named its women's ward Marquette in memory of the three nurses. When the hospital closed in 1996, the plaque was moved to a display at the Waimate Museum.

Gorman is named on the Mikra British Cemetery in Greece and in the Nurses' Memorial Chapel at Christchurch Hospital. She is also remembered in the Five Sisters window at York Minster in York, England.
