= Mabel Jamieson =

New Zealand nurse (1881–1915)

Mabel Elizabeth Jamieson
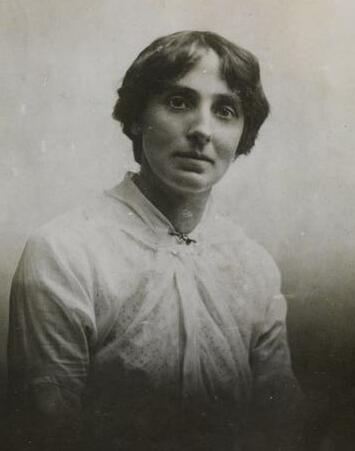
- Born: 21 July 1881
- Died: 23 October 1915 (aged 35)
- Cause of death: Sinking of SS Marquette
- Occupation: Nurse

Mabel Elizabeth Jamieson (21 July 1881 – 23 October 1915) was a New Zealand nurse who served in the First World War and died when the SS Marquette was torpedoed and sunk in 1915.

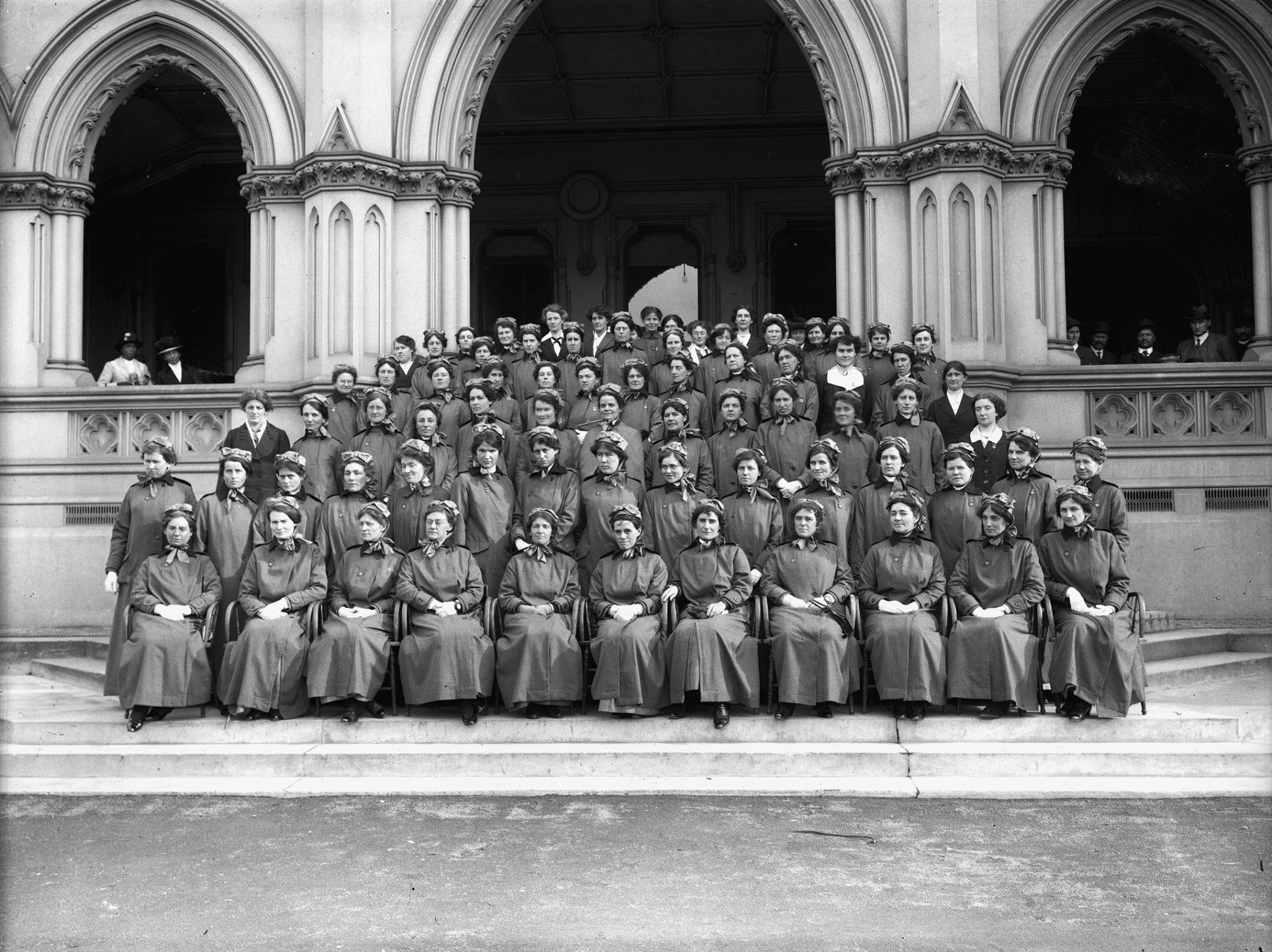
New Zealand Army Nursing Service nurses, Government House, Wellington 1915; Jamieson is in the front row, second from the right

== Early life ==
Jamieson was born in 1881 in Kumara, on the West Coast of the South Island of New Zealand. Her parents were Thomas and Frances Jamieson. She trained as a nurse at Palmerston North Hospital.

== First World War ==
Jamieson was nursing at Palmerston North Hospital when she resigned her position to enlist in the New Zealand Army Nursing Service in 1915. She left Wellington on board the SS Maheno. The ship sailed to Port Said, Egypt, and the contingent of nurses worked in a stationary hospital there. In October 1915 Jamieson was on board the SS Marquette when it was torpedoed by a German submarine and sunk.

=== Recognition ===
On 21 November 1915, a memorial service was held at the Palmerston North Opera House presided over by the mayor, Jimmy Nash, for the Marquette nurses, which included Jamieson and fellow Palmerston North nurse Marion Brown.

Jamieson is named on the Mikra British Cemetery in Greece, the Rewa War Memorial in Rangitikei and in the Nurses' Memorial Chapel at Christchurch Hospital. She is also remembered in the Five Sisters window at York Minster in York, England. In Kumara, there is a plaque in the Kumara Memorial Hall and a memorial bed in the Kumara Hospital.
