= Isabel Clark =

Isabel Clark may refer to:

- Isabel Clark Ribeiro (born 1976), snowboarder from Brazil
- Isabel Clark (nurse) (1885–1915), New Zealand nurse
