= Catherine Fox (disambiguation) =

Catherine Fox is an American former Olympic swimmer

Catherine Fox may also refer to:

- Catherine Fox (nurse) (1877–1915), New Zealand nurse
- Catherine Fox (journalist), Australian journalist, author, feminist and public speaker
- Catherine Fox (1837–1892), spiritualist, one of the Fox sisters

== See also ==
- Kate Fox (disambiguation)
