= Mary Rae =

New Zealand nurse (1880–1915)

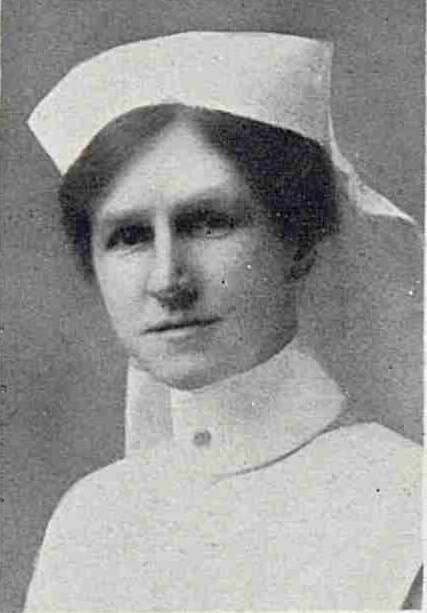
- Mary Helen Rae - April 1916
- Born: 29 September 1880
- Died: 23 October 1915 (aged 35)
- Cause of death: Sinking of SS Marquette
- Occupation: Nurse

Mary Helen Rae (29 September 1880 – 23 October 1915) was a New Zealand nurse who served in the First World War and died when the SS Marquette was torpedoed and sunk in 1915.

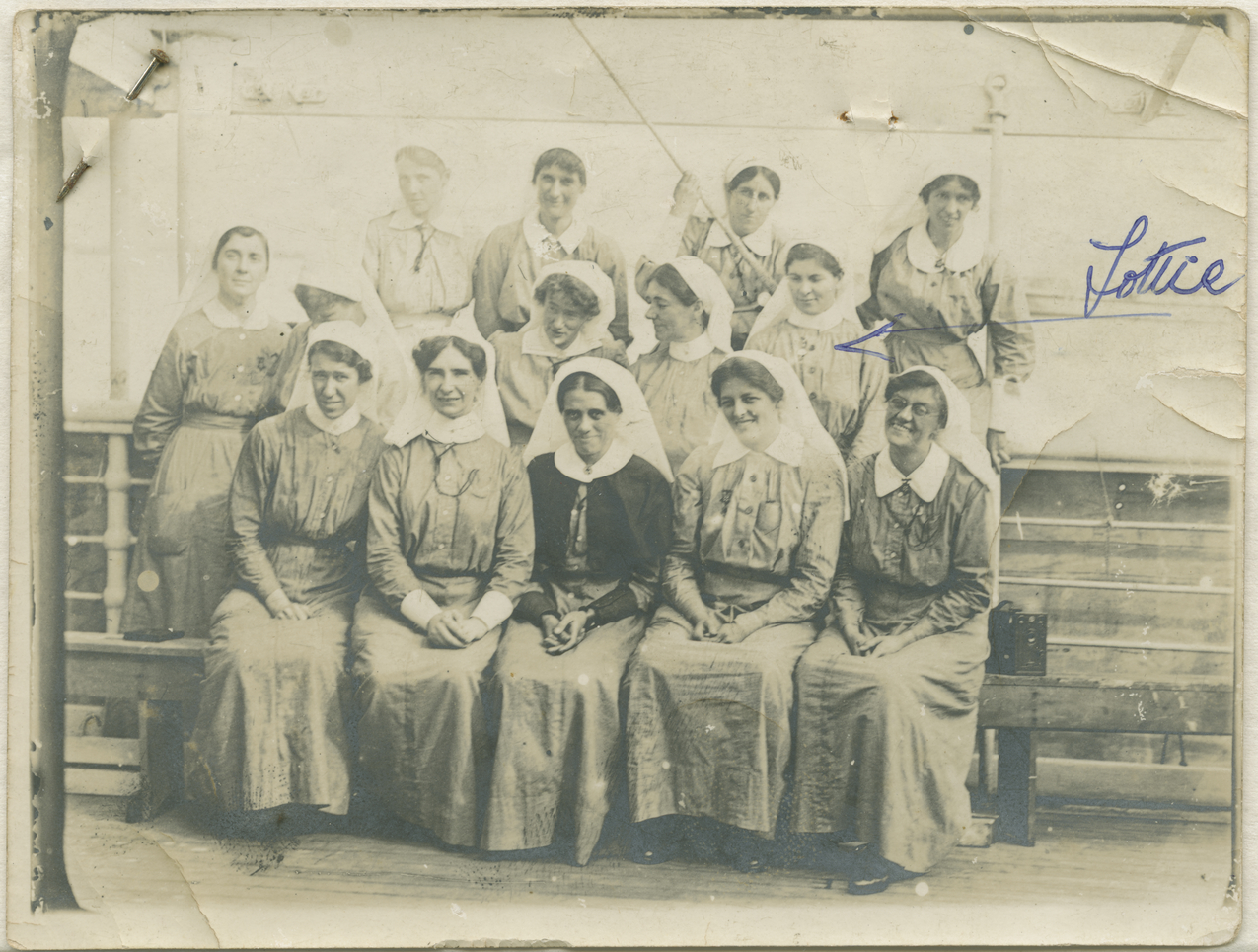
Unidentified group of New Zealand nurses on board SS Maheno, 1915

== Early life ==
Rae was born at Raes' Junction, near Dunedin, on 29 September 1880 and trained at Dunedin Hospital.

== First World War ==
In April 1915, Rae enlisted in the New Zealand Army Nursing Service and left Wellington on board the SS Maheno in July that year. The ship sailed to Suez, Egypt, and the contingent of nurses worked in a stationary hospital at Port Said. In October 1915 Rae was on board the SS Marquette when it was torpedoed by a German submarine and sunk. The torpedo struck the Marquette on its starboard side at 9.15am. The ship was sunk within fifteen minutes, resulting in the deaths of Rae and others aboard.

=== Recognition ===
Two years after her death, the Otago Nurses' Association created the New Zealand Nurses' Memorial Fund in memorial to Rae and fellow Otago Marquette victim, Lorna Rattray. Donations from the medical community in Dunedin started the fund, which aimed to be a practical fund of "people helping people". Most grants are given to retired nurses who are struggling financially.

Rae is named on the Mikra British Cemetery in Greece and in the Nurses' Memorial Chapel at Christchurch Hospital. She is also remembered in the Five Sisters window at York Minster in York, England.
