= Helena Isdell =

New Zealand nurse (1888–1915)

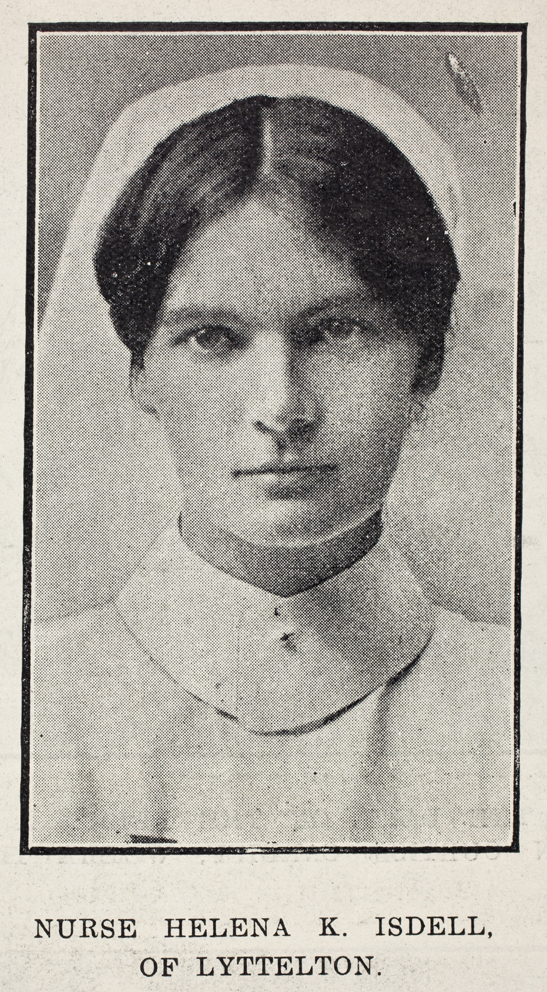
- Born: 30 November 1888
- Died: 23 October 1915 (aged 26)
- Cause of death: Sinking of SS Marquette
- Occupation: Nurse

Helena Kathleen Isdell (30 November 1888 – 23 October 1915) was a New Zealand nurse who served in the First World War and died in the sinking of SS Marquette in 1915.

== Early life ==
Isdell was born in Greymouth, on the West Coast of New Zealand, on 30 November 1888. Her parents were Josephine Margaret and James Isdell. After completing her training, Isdell was the matron at Kumara Hospital on the West Coast. However, some sources also list her home as Napier or Lyttelton.

== First World War ==
In June 1915, Isdell enlisted in the Royal New Zealand Army Nursing Service. She left Wellington in July on the SS Maheno, travelling with 69 other New Zealand nurses, and arrived in Port Said, Egypt, in August. On 19 October, the hospital unit boarded the SS Marquette in Alexandria, but four days later it was sunk by a torpedo from a German submarine. Isdell's body was found in a lifeboat, along with that of Margaret Rogers and four men, which washed up on the shore near the Greek town of Zagorá.

Isdell had a sister, Isabel, who also served as a nurse during the war. A brother, Charles, enlisted in the New Zealand Expeditionary Force and died in action in 1917.

=== Recognition ===
Isdell is named on the Mikra British Cemetery in Greece and in the Nurses' Memorial Chapel at Christchurch Hospital. She is also remembered in the Five Sisters window at York Minster in York, England. Kumara Hospital (no longer in existence) had a memorial bed in Isdell's name. She is also recognised on the war memorial pillars of the former Greymouth Main School. These were unceremoniously removed from their original location in 2007 following transfer of school site ownership to the Mawhera Corporation. They were subsequently relocated in 2010 to Greymouth's Dixon Park.
