= Margaret Rogers (nurse) =

New Zealand nurse (1887–1915)

- Born: 11 December 1887
- Died: 23 October 1915 (aged 27)
- Cause of death: Sinking of SS Marquette
- Occupation: Nurse

Margaret Rogers (11 December 1887 – 23 October 1915) was a New Zealand nurse who served in the First World War and died when the SS Marquette was torpedoed and sunk in 1915.

== Early life ==
Rogers was born in Oamaru, North Otago, one of seven children. The family later moved to Banks Peninsula, near Christchurch. The name of her mother, a midwife, is unknown, however her father was Thomas Rogers. She trained as a nurse at Christchurch Hospital from 1911 to 1913, then completed a midwifery certificate at St. Helens' Hospital.

After qualifying, Rogers was a district nurse with the Nurse Maude organisation in Christchurch. While living in Christchurch, she was a member of St. Andrew's Presbyterian Church, and a leader of the church's Young Women's Bible Class. She volunteered to go to Vanuatu as a nursing missionary, to assist with the establishment of a hospital there, however a natural disaster destroyed the area she was to go to.

== First World War ==
In July 1915, she enlisted in the New Zealand Army Nursing Service and left Wellington on board the SS Maheno. The ship sailed to Port Said, Egypt, and the contingent of nurses worked in a stationary hospital there. In October 1915 Rogers was on board the SS Marquette when it was torpedoed by a German submarine and sunk. Her body was found in a lifeboat with that of fellow nurse Helena Isdell, and four men, which washed ashore near the Greek town of Zagora.

=== Recognition ===
Rogers is named on the Mikra British Cemetery in Greece and in the Nurses' Memorial Chapel at Christchurch Hospital. She is also remembered in the Five Sisters window at York Minster in York, England. Her name appears on the Akaroa War Memorial.
