= Jean Erwin =

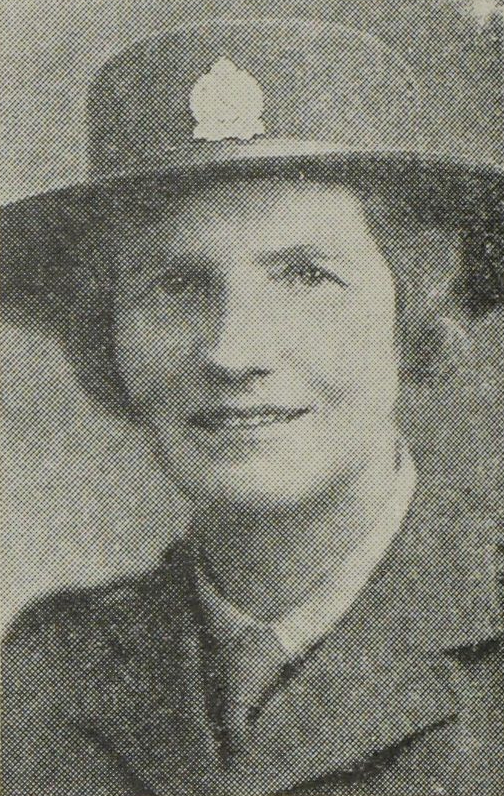
Jean Erwin

Jean Neill Erwin MBE (25 January 1890 – 24 July 1969) was a New Zealand civilian and military nurse, masseuse, and army nursing administrator.

Erwin was born in Fendalton, Christchurch, New Zealand on 25 January 1890. Her parents were the Presbyterian minister Reverend Dr Robert Erwin and Esther Erwin.

In July 1915, Erwin enlisted in the New Zealand Army Nursing Service and was posted overseas leaving on the SS Maheno. In October that year, she was aboard the SS Marquette when it was torpedoed by a German submarine and sunk. Ten New Zealand nurses lost their lives, but Erwin and other survivors continued to serve in hospitals and hospital ships for the remainder of World War I. She then nursed at the No. 1 New Zealand General Hospital in Brockenhurst, England from 1916 through the 1918-1919 flu epidemic. After the war had ended, she continued as a nurse in England before returning to New Zealand in 1920.

Erwin worked at Queen Mary Hospital in Hanmer Springs in 1921 and then trained as a physiotherapist (known at the time as a masseuse) in 1922. She worked at Wellington Hospital before becoming head of the physiotherapy department at Christchurch Hospital.

During World War II Erwin was District Commandant of the Women’s Auxiliary Army Corps as she was too old to serve overseas.

She was an elder at Knox Church in Christchurch. In 1968 she unveiled a memorial window in the Nurses' Memorial Chapel at Christchurch Hospital.

Erwin died on 24 July 1969 at Christchurch Hospital.

== Honours and awards ==
She was appointed a Member of the Order of the British Empire (MBE) in the 1945 King's Birthday Honours just after her retirement from the military.
