= Marion Brown (nurse) =

New Zealand nurse (1880–1915)

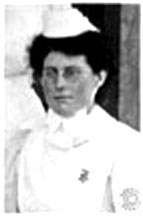
- Born: 6 October 1880; Lesmahagow, Lanarkshire, Scotland
- Died: 23 October 1915 (aged 35)
- Cause of death: Sinking of SS Marquette
- Occupation: Nurse

Marion Sinclair Brown (6 October 1880 – 23 October 1915) was a New Zealand nurse who served in the First World War and died in the sinking of the SS Marquette in 1915.

== Early life ==
Brown was born in Lesmahagow, Lanarkshire, Scotland to John and Maggie Brown. The Browns emigrated with five children to the small town of Waimatuku, Southland, New Zealand, where they went on to have a further 10 children. Brown initially worked as a domestic servant in Thornbury, but moved to Riverton in 1908 to train as a nurse. Once qualified, Brown worked in Palmerston North and then in Waimate.

== First World War ==
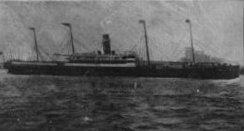
Brown served as a nurse aboard the SS Marquette

In June 1915 Brown enlisted in the New Zealand Army Nursing Service, and was immediately posted overseas. Brown was on board the SS Marquette in October of that year when it was torpedoed by a German submarine and sunk.

A survivor, Mabel White, saw Brown and her fellow nurse Isabel Clark on the deck of the ship moments after it had been hit. White saw Brown and Clark join hands and walk together off the deck, leaping into the sea hand-in-hand. Neither Clark nor Brown survived.

=== Recognition ===
On 22 November 1915, a memorial service was held in Palmerston North for Brown and fellow Palmerston North staff nurse and Marquette victim Mabel Jamieson.

Brown is named on the Mikra British Cemetery in Greece and in the Five Sisters window at York Minster in York, England. She is also remembered by the Nurses' Memorial Chapel in Christchurch. A portrait of Brown hung in the entry hall of Riverton Hospital for many years, and was later moved to Wallace Early Settlers Museum.

Brown was entitled to three medals for her service during the First World War: the 1914-1915 Star, the British War Medal and the Victory Medal.
