= New Zealand Army Nursing Service =

The New Zealand Army Nursing Service (NZANS) formally came into being in early 1915, when the Army Council in London accepted an offer of nurses to help in the war effort during the First World War from the New Zealand Government. The heavy losses experienced in the Gallipoli campaign cemented the need for the service.

== History ==
=== Background ===
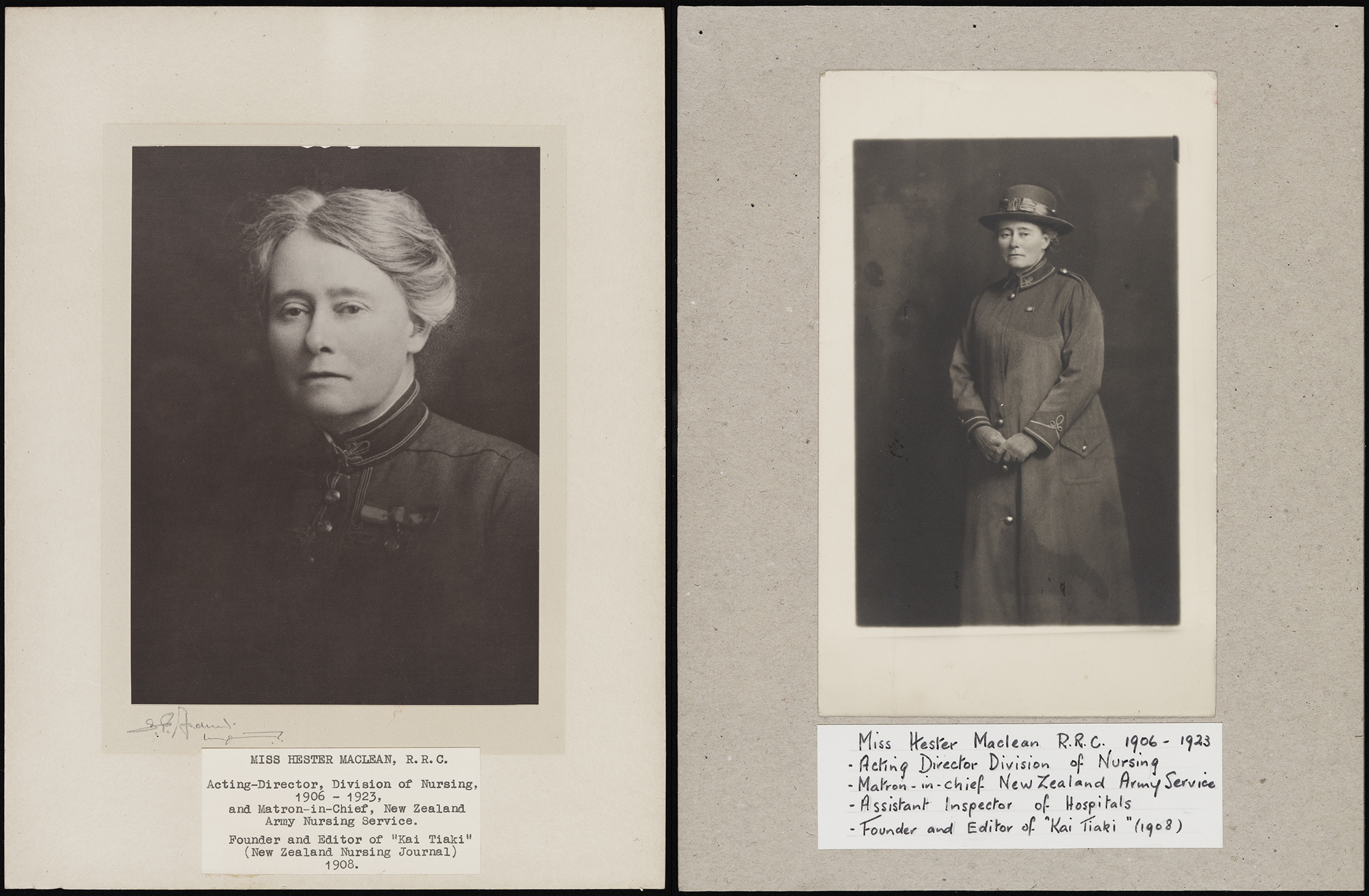
This photographs dated 1906-1923 depicts Hester Maclean during the period when she was Assistant Inspector of Hospitals for New Zealand. Maclean was also Matron in Chief of the New Zealand Army Nursing Service. In 1917 Maclean was awarded the Royal Red Cross (first class) for her work.

In 1911 Hester Maclean had been given the title of 'matron-in-chief' of a proposed military nursing reserve, but despite her efforts (and those of Janet Gillies before her) no service existed by the time New Zealand entered the First World War. New Zealand nurses were motivated by the same sense of duty and patriotism as men who volunteered to serve, but despite over 400 women coming forward in the first two months after the outbreak of war, their offers were refused on the basis that enough nurses would be available from England. Hester Maclean pushed for nurses to be sent overseas, writing in the October 1914 issue of the nursing journal Kai Tiaki, “Britain’s sons are eager to save her. Her daughters too, are all for helping.” The New Zealand Defence Minister, James Allen was however reluctant, stating that "until the Mother Country asks us to provide nurses, it would be a presumption to send them."

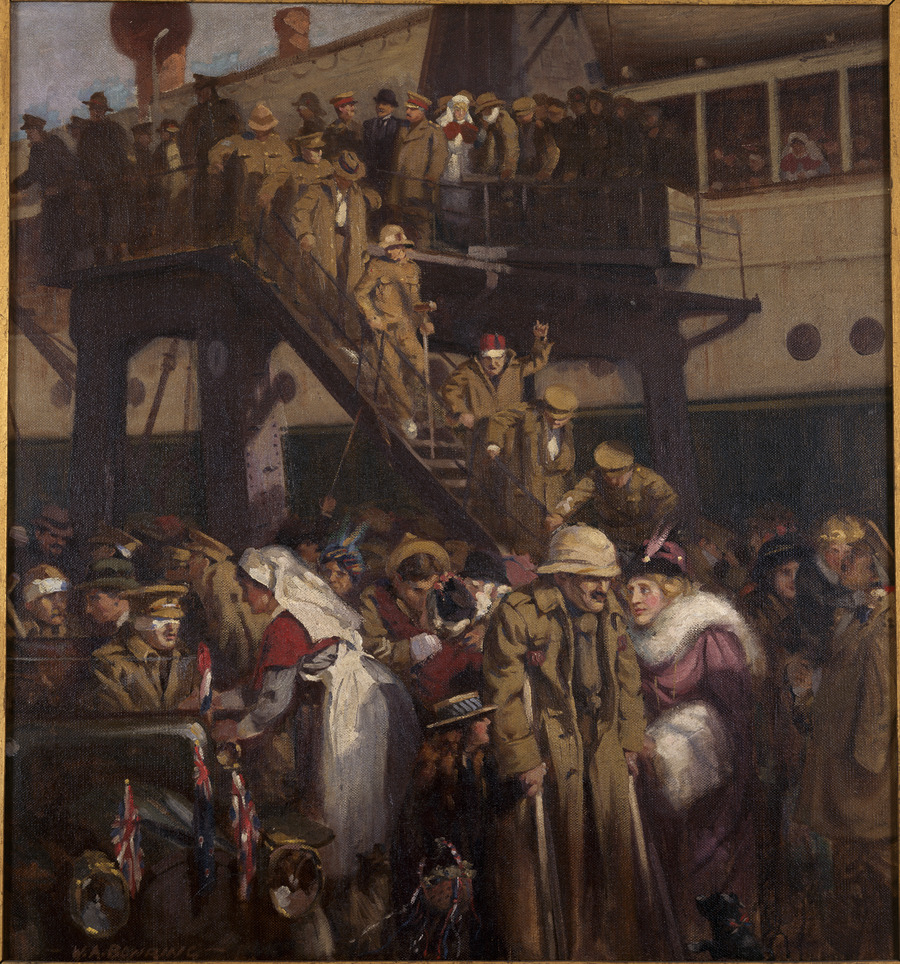
"The Homecoming from Gallipoli" by Walter Armiger Bowring. Painted in 1916, it shows the return of the first group of wounded soldiers from Gallipoli in 1915. Note the scarlet capes and grey uniforms of the NZANS nurses, assisting the men.

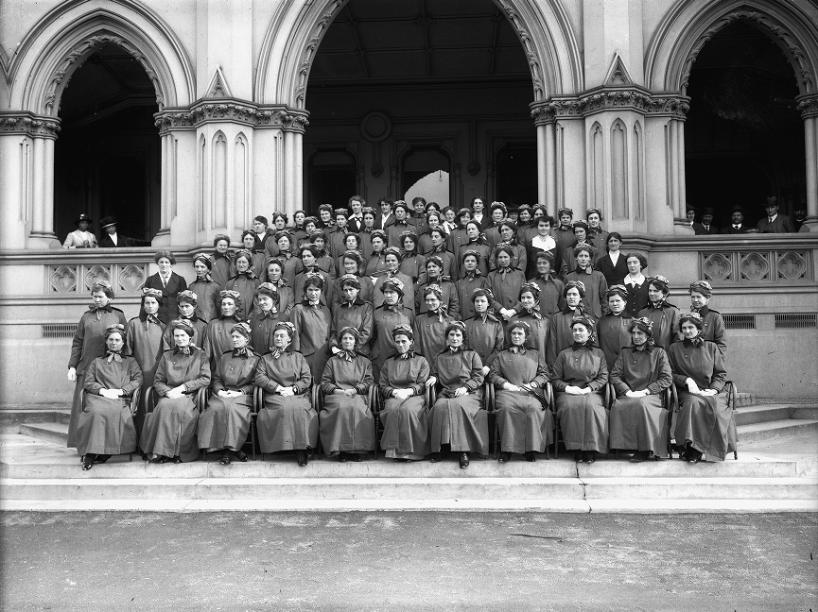
Group portrait of the first 69 nurses and 11 staff to leave for World War I. Taken on the steps of the General Assembly Library, Wellington, by an unidentified photographer for The Press newspaper of Christchurch.

Six nurses were sent to German Samoa on 15 August 1914.

=== Formation and First World War ===
Eventually Allen bowed to pressure (in particular from Hester Maclean) and on 7 January 1915 sent a telegram to the War office in England offering to dispatch 50 trained nurses, which the British accepted on 25 January. On 25 January 1915, the offer of nurses from New Zealand was finally accepted, and Hester Maclean was asked to select 50 nurses to travel to England. Meanwhile, Allen had submitted a proposal to Cabinet recommending that authority be given to provisionally enrol 60 nurses and that the Defence Act be amended to make provision for the New Zealand Army Nursing Service (NZANS). This proposal was approved by cabinet on 11 January 1915. The establishment of the NZAS contributed to a surge of interest in woman interested in becoming nurses. By August 1915 Waikato Hospital was struggling to cope with the number of applicants it was receiving for nurse training and had a waiting list of over 100. At short notice in March 2015, a dozen nurses were requested by the Australian government to join a nursing contingent sailing to Egypt and they departed on 1 April.

On 8 April 1915 the 50 nurses led by Hester Maclean departed on the SS Rotorua , from Glasgow Wharf in Wellington. The nurses were farewelled by a large crowd with the nearby buildings were decorated with bunting, parting gifts were given to them, while a band played popular tunes such as “The Girl I Left Behind Me”. In choosing the nurses Maclean had drawn from as many hospitals as possible. All of the women were unmarried, with at least six years of nursing experience and their average age was 27. On arrival in London, the 50 nurses were given orders to sail on to Egypt to tend to the wounded arriving from Gallipoli. Hester Maclean accompanied them and remained in Egypt to meet further nursing contingents from New Zealand. Along with tending the terrible wounds of the soldiers, the nurses had to treat dysentery, typhoid and heat stroke. They were working long hours in high temperatures, and sometimes in tented hospital accommodations pitched on the sand.

Lottie Le Gallais, a nurse in a later contingent who served aboard the hospital ship Maheno wrote "Terrible, terrible wounds. The bullets aren’t so bad but the shrapnel from exploding shells is ghastly. It cuts great gashes, ripping muscles and bones to shreds. Thirty-nine men have died on board so far and every one suffered great pain and discomfort." By August 1915 a second contingent of nurses from New Zealand arrived in Egypt, and a third contingent of 11 nurses had departed aboard the hospital ship Maheno.

Ten nurses lost their lives when the troopship Marquette was torpedoed and sank in the Aegean Sea on 23 October 1915.

Approximately 550 woman served in the NZANS, while other New Zealand woman served with organisations such as the Imperial Nursing Service.

== Uniform during World War I ==
The first nurses who left New Zealand in August 1914 to serve with the New Zealand Medical Corps in Samoa wore a uniform based on a design by Hester Maclean, that was similar to those being worn by other overseas organisation.

Once the NZANS was officially formed Maclean proposed In October 1914 that the official uniform include a large cloak. This cloak was however replaced in the final proposed design with more practical long coat. The final uniform was approved in February 1915. The outdoor uniform consisted of a long grey woollen dress and a coat with a grey bonnet with ribbon ties. The dress featured a Chinese style collar and had small brass NZ Army buttons on the bodice. An option for outdoor use was a short red cape and the coat which had a scarlet collar. The coat had only a half-belt at the back, but many nurses added a full belt for which they were reprimanded. The nurses were permitted to have uniforms made providing they used the same style. While there were variations over the course of the war generally due to different tailoring and use of different materials it remained basically the same. As the need for a lighter uniform became evident when the women were serving in Egypt this led towards the end of the war to the skirt length becoming shorter. The official badge of the NZANS consisted of a red cross enclosed within a silver fern, surmounted by a crown. It was worn on all the outdoor and working uniforms.

== Notable members ==
- Jessie Bicknell
- Evelyn Brooke
- Marion Brown
- Isabel Clark
- Jean Erwin
- Catherine Fox
- Mary Gorman
- Nona Hildyard
- Alice Holford
- Helena Isdell
- Mabel Jamieson
- Charlotte Le Gallais
- Mary Looney
- Hester Maclean
- Mary Rae
- Lorna Rattray
- Cora Beattie Anderson Roberton
- Margaret Rogers
- Edith Rudd
- Mabel Thurston
- Fanny Wilson
- Edna Pengelly
- Louise Alexa McNie
