= Catherine Fox (nurse) =

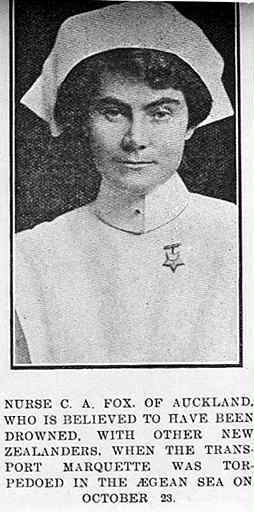
- The Auckland Weekly News, 1915
- Born: 18 May 1877
- Died: 23 October 1915 (aged 38)
- Cause of death: Sinking of SS Marquette
- Occupation: Nurse

Catherine Anne Fox (18 May 1877 – 23 October 1915) was a New Zealand nurse who served in the First World War and died when the SS Marquette was torpedoed and sunk in 1915.

== Early life ==
Fox was born at Cardrona, near Queenstown, New Zealand. The family moved to Hawea Flat and later Waimate. She completed her nursing training at Dunedin Hospital. After qualifying, Fox nursed in Christchurch, Waimate and Auckland.

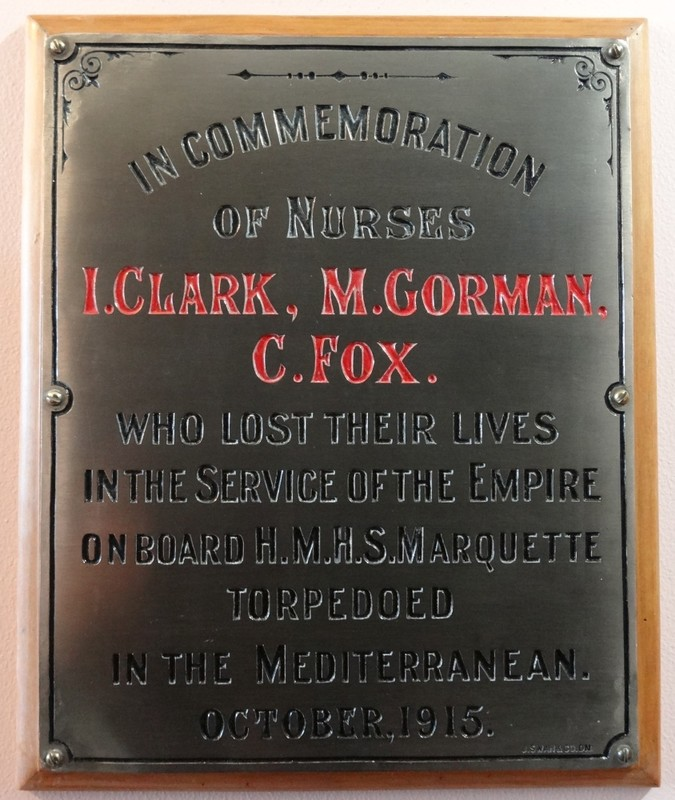
Waimate Hospital plaque to nurses who died on the SS Marquette

== First World War ==
In July 1915, Fox enlisted in the New Zealand Army Nursing Service and left Wellington on board the SS Maheno. The ship sailed to Port Said, Egypt, and the contingent of nurses worked in a stationary hospital there. In October 1915, she was on board the SS Marquette when it was torpedoed by a German submarine at 9.15am. The Marquette was hit on the starboard side and sunk within fifteen minutes, leading to the deaths of Fox and others aboard.

=== Recognition ===
A commemorative plaque to Fox, and fellow Marquette casualties Mary Gorman and Isabel Clark, was placed in Waimate Hospital. The hospital also named its women's ward Marquette in memory of the three nurses. When the hospital closed in 1996, the plaque was moved to a display at the Waimate Museum.

Fox is named on the Mikra British Cemetery in Greece and in the Nurses' Memorial Chapel at Christchurch Hospital. She is also remembered in the Five Sisters window at York Minster in York, England.
