= Mary Looney =

New Zealand nurse

Mary Frances Looney ARRC (6 August 1886 – 29 August 1961) was a New Zealand civilian and wartime nurse. She served in World War I and was made an Associate of the Royal Red Cross.

== Early life ==
Looney was born in Winton, in the province of Southland, New Zealand, on 6 August 1886. She was the second of 11 children of a farming family. Her parents were John and Mary (née Colgan). She was educated at St Catherine's College in Invercargill and trained as a nurse at Southland Hospital.

== Career ==
After qualifying, Looney nursed at Southland Hospital, and was promoted to acting matron in 1913. In 1914, she was appointed matron at Gore Hospital. Later the same year, she enlisted in the New Zealand Army Nursing Service and embarked on the hospital ship Maheno. She served both on the hospital ship and at the New Zealand Stationary Hospital in Cairo. In October 1915, Looney was with other medical staff from the hospital travelling aboard the British troop ship, the SS Marquette, when it was torpedoed and sunk in the Aegean Sea. Looney survived by clinging to the tail of a mule, and was rescued after eight hours in the water. She suffered scalp injuries and lost all her hair, which later grew back white. Looney continued to nurse to the end of the war, serving as night superintendent of a 1200-bed hospital in France, and also nursing in military hospitals in England. She was made an Associate of the Royal Red Cross by King George V.

After the war, Looney returned to New Zealand and worked as matron of the Queen Mary Hospital in Hanmer Springs, and the Red Cross Convalescent Home in Invercargill. She later opened her own private hospital, Cairnsmore, and nursed there until her marriage in 1921 to police officer Thomas Clarke Muir.

The Muirs ran hotels in Christchurch, Napier, Otautau, Winton and Dunedin, and raised two sons and a daughter. She died in Dunedin on 29 August 1961; she and her husband were proprietors of Gresham Hotel at the time.
