= Lorna Rattray =

New Zealand nurse (1875–1915)

Lorna Aylmer Rattray
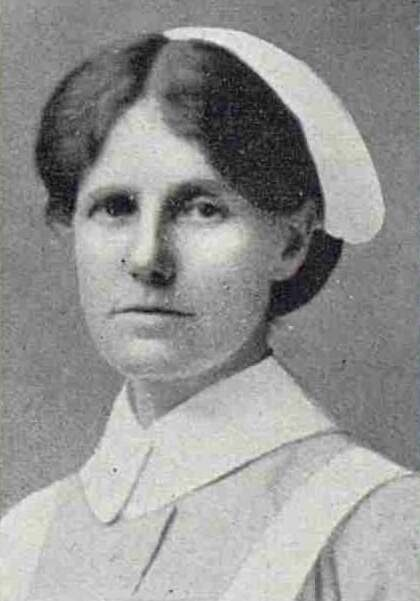
- Lorna Aylmer Rattray - April 1916
- Born: 10 January 1875
- Died: 23 October 1915 (aged 40)
- Cause of death: Sinking of SS Marquette
- Occupation: Nurse

Lorna Aylmer Rattray (10 January 1875 – 23 October 1915) was a New Zealand nurse who served in the First World War and died when the SS Marquette was torpedoed and sunk in 1915.

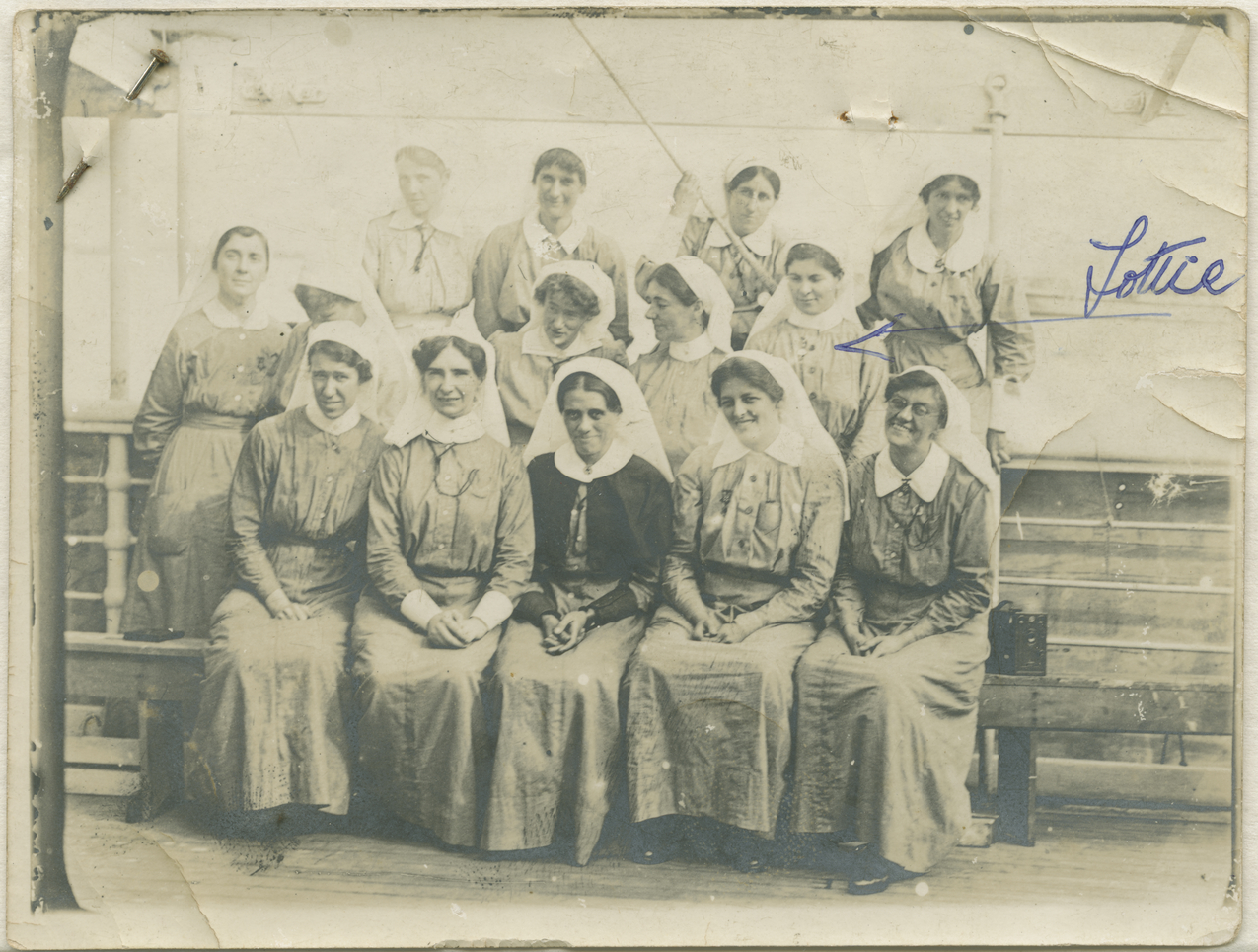
Unidentified group of New Zealand nurses on board SS Maheno, 1915

== Early life ==
Rattray was born in Dunedin. After qualifying, Rattray nursed in Christchurch.

== First World War ==
In July 1915, Rattray enlisted in the New Zealand Army Nursing Service and left Wellington on board the SS Maheno. The ship sailed to Port Said, Egypt, and the contingent of nurses worked in a stationary hospital there. In October 1915 she was on board the SS Marquette when it was torpedoed by a German submarine and sunk. The torpedo struck the Marquette on its starboard side at 9.15am. The ship was sunk within fifteen minutes, resulting in the deaths of Rattray and others aboard.

=== Recognition ===
Two years after her death, the Otago Nurses' Association created the New Zealand Nurses' Memorial Fund in memorial to Rattray and fellow Otago Marquette victim, Mary Rae. Donations from the medical community in Dunedin started the fund, which aimed to be a practical fund of "people helping people". Most grants are given to retired nurses who are struggling financially.

Rattray is named on the Mikra British Cemetery in Greece and in the Nurses' Memorial Chapel at Christchurch Hospital. She is also remembered in the Five Sisters window at York Minsterr in York, England.

There is a commemorative plaque to Rattray in St. Matthew's Church, Dunedin.

=== Film ===
In 2014, actress Robyn Paterson played Lorna Rattray in the Australian television mini series ANZAC Girls, appearing in the episodes "Duty" and "Endurance".
