= Minnie Jeffery =

New Zealand nurse and midwife (1884–1963)

Minnie Johns Jeffery MBE (22 June 1884 – 6 January 1963) was a New Zealand civilian and military nurse and midwife. She served as a nurse during World War I.

== Early life ==
Jeffery was born in Dunedin to James Jeffery and his wife Annie (née Johns). The family lived in Andersons Bay, and Jeffery was educated at Andersons Bay School, where her father taught and was headmaster.

== Career ==
Jeffery trained as a nurse and midwife in Dunedin, qualifying as a state registered nurse in 1910. She later became Matron at the Karitane Home, which specialised in babycare. She enlisted as a military nurse in 1914 and left New Zealand on Hospital Ship No. 1, the Maheno. Her war service was varied: she helped evacuate wounded soldiers from Gallipoli, worked in Alexandria at the New Zealand General Hospital and helped evacuate casualties from Solum and Tobruk to Alexandria. Later, she served on the French ship Valdivia and evacuated wounded from the Balkans. In September 1915, she was injured and lost her right eye. In October 1915, Jeffery was aboard the SS Marquette when it was torpedoed and sunk in the Aegean Sea. She escaped in one of the few lifeboats to be successfully launched. Jeffery also nursed at the New Zealand General Hospital in Walton-on-Thames, England.

After the war, Jeffery returned to Dunedin and nursed in the soldiers' ward at the public hospital. In 1920 she joined the Health Department and worked there as a nursing inspector until her retirement.

Jeffery died in Dunedin on 6 January 1963 and is buried in Andersons Bay Cemetery.
