= Kate Fox (disambiguation) =

Kate Fox is a social anthropologist and author.

Kate Fox may also refer to:

- Kate Fox (writer), British poet, author, and comedian
- Kate M. Fox (born 1955), American lawyer and judge
- Kate Fox (1837–1892), one of the Fox sisters: 19th-century spiritualist hoaxers

== See also ==
- Katy Fox, a character on the TV program Hollyoaks
- Catherine Fox (disambiguation)
