= Nona Hildyard =

New Zealand nurse (1888–1915)

Nona Mildred Hildyard
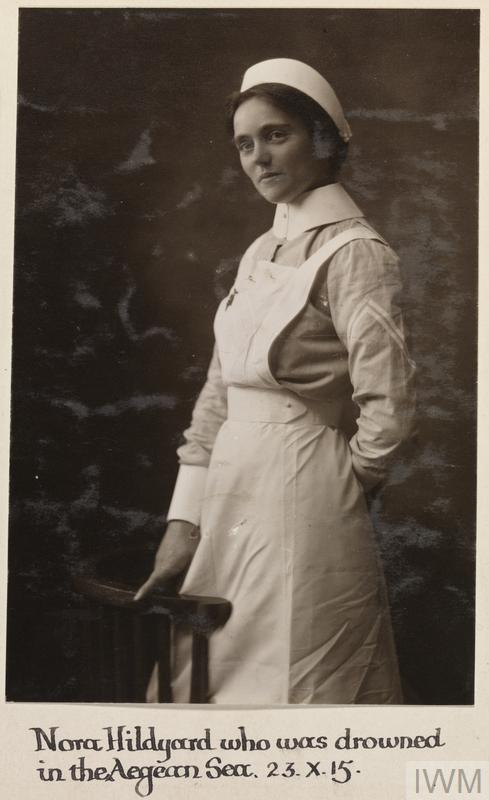
- Born: 4 November 1888
- Died: 23 October 1915 (aged 26)
- Cause of death: Sinking of SS Marquette
- Occupation: Nurse

Nona Mildred Hildyard (4 November 1888 – 23 October 1915) was a New Zealand nurse who served in the First World War and died in the sinking of SS Marquette in 1915.

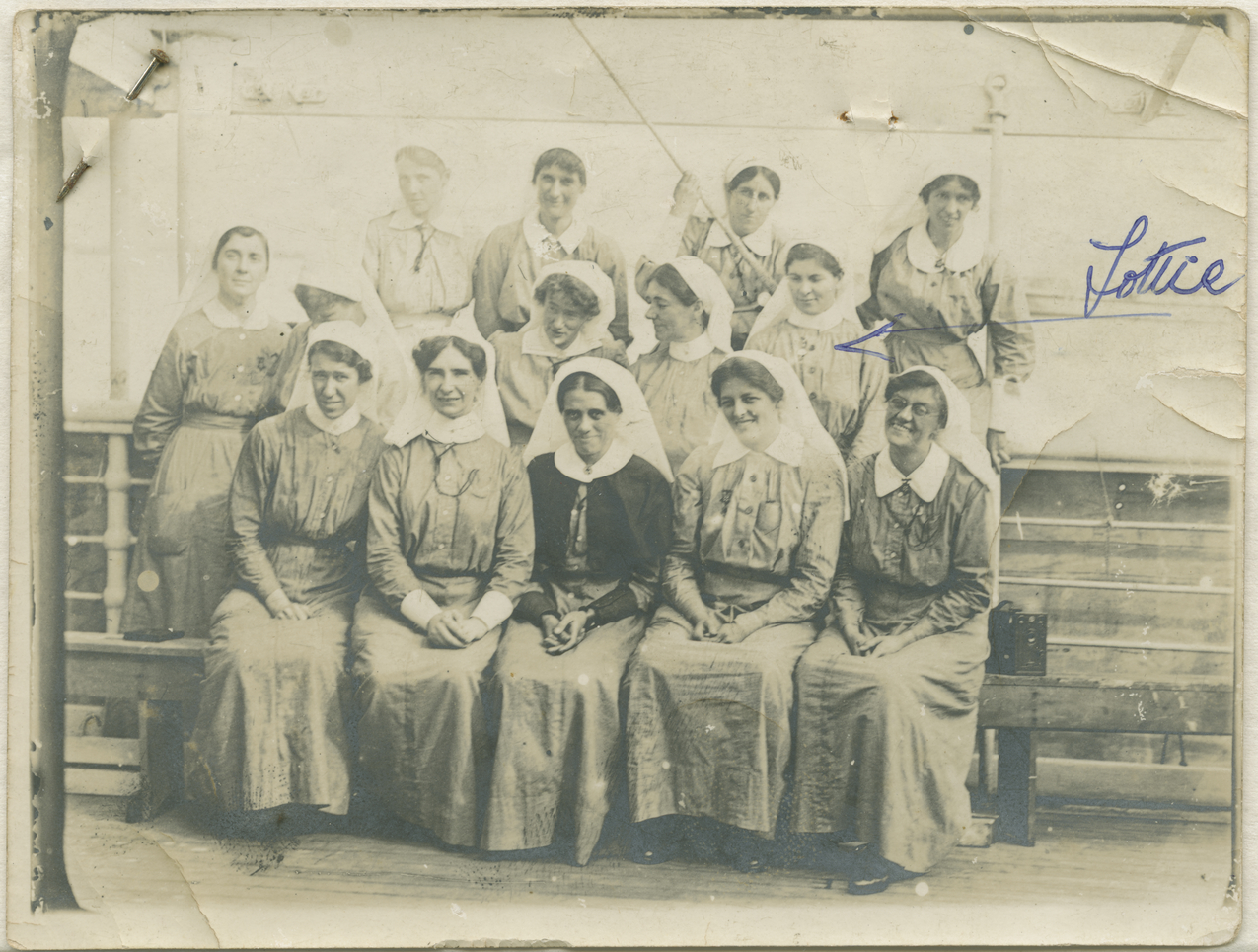
Unidentified group of New Zealand nurses on board SS Maheno, 1915

== Early life ==
Hildyard was born in Lyttelton, near Christchurch, New Zealand, on 4 November 1888, to William and Betsy Ann Hildyard. Her father was a bootmaker and a Lyttelton Borough Councillor. Hildyard attended West Lyttelton School and Lyttelton District High School. She trained as a nurse at Christchurch Hospital. After her initial training, Hildyard worked for a Christchurch doctor, A.C. Sandston, and later at Nurse Turner's private hospital in Woolston.

== First World War ==
In June 1915, Hildyard was selected for the Royal New Zealand Army Nursing Service. She left Wellington in July on the SS Maheno, travelling with 69 other New Zealand nurses, and arrived in Port Said, Egypt, in August. On 19 October, the hospital unit boarded the SS Marquette in Alexandria, but four days later it was sunk by a torpedo from a German submarine. Hildyard was injured by a falling lifeboat, and although she survived for some hours, she eventually died in the water before a rescue ship arrived. Survivors reported that she sang while in the water, to keep spirits up.

=== Recognition ===
In 1916, the people of Lyttelton raised money and commissioned artist Richard Wallwork to paint a portrait of Hildyard, which was presented to the Borough Council in 1917. In 2006 the painting was transferred to the Christchurch Art Gallery.

Hildyard is named on the Lyttelton War Memorial, the Mikra British Cemetery in Greece and in the Nurses' Memorial Chapel at Christchurch Hospital. She is also remembered in the Five Sisters window at York Minster in York, England.
