= Marjory Edwards =

British VAD nurse who served during the First World War

Marjory Eva May Edwards
- Born: 1891; Liverpool, England
- Died: 4 January 1918 (aged 26); Hampstead, London, England
- Occupation: nurse
- Known for: V.A.D. nurse who served and died during the First World War

Marjory Eva May Edwards (1891 – 4 January 1918) was a British V.A.D. nurse who served in the British Red Cross Society during the First World War. Edwards served for three and a half years in Britain and France and died of measles in England on 4 January 1918. Her name is listed on the village war memorial at St Mary's Church of England church at Streatley, Berkshire and she is a rare female name on a First World War British war memorial.

== Early life and First World War service ==
Marjory Eva May Edwards was born in 1891, the elder daughter of parents John Henry Edwards and Isabel Mary Jane Edwards, and was baptised at St Catherine's, Liverpool on 21 November 1891.

Upon the outbreak of the First World War in August 1914, Edwards began working for the British Red Cross Society, first serving as a V.A.D. nurse at the Battle Hospital in Goring-on-Thames, the village next to her home of the Hut, Streatley, Berkshire, England.

Two years later in November 1916, Edwards (now aged 24) began serving at the Rouen military hospital in France. In August 1917 and after nearly a year's service abroad, Edwards returned to Britain due to ill health. She did not return to full health but nonetheless returned to hospital service at the 2nd London General Hospital military hospital in Chelsea, London where she served for a month between late September and late October 1917. Here she contacted measles and later died of related complications on 4 January 1918 at the North Western Hospital, Hampstead, London, aged just 26 and after three and a half years' nursing service. Her War Office service medal card does not provide any further detail of her service. A local newspaper, the Reading Observer, noted of her death: "her loss is deeply felt by her fellow workers and many friends both in Goring and Streatley, where she was universally beloved."

== Legacy ==
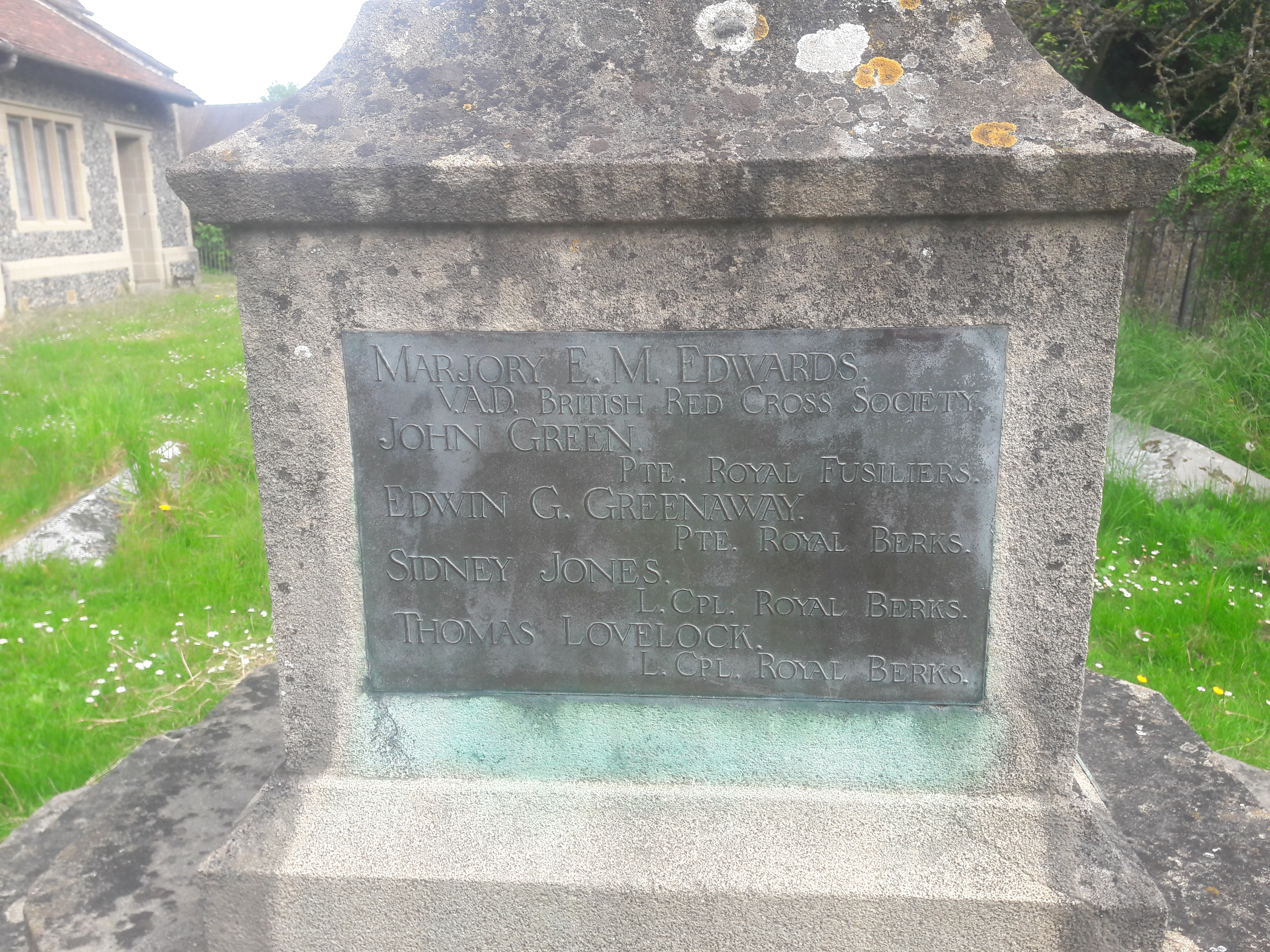
Streatley village war memorial, St Mary's Church, Streatley-on-Thames, England

Edwards' name is listed (as Marjory E. M. Edwards, V.A.D. British Red Cross Society) on the village war memorial at St Mary's Church of England church at Streatley, Berkshire. She is a rare female name on a First World War British war memorial.
