= SS Marquette (1897) =

British cargo liner sunk in 1915

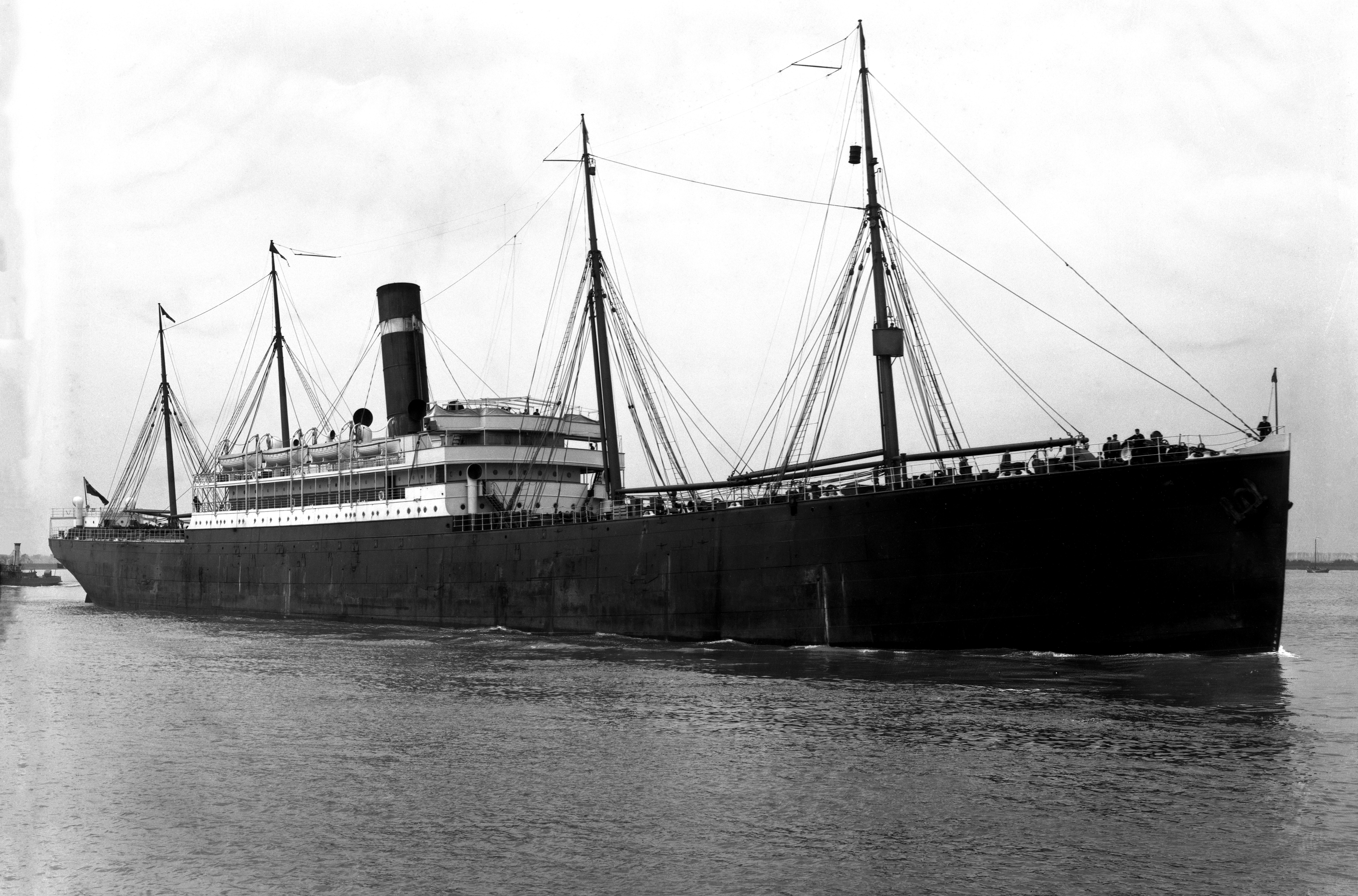
- Marquette, probably in the Scheldt

History

United Kingdom
- Name: 1897: Boadicea; 1898: Marquette
- Namesake: 1897: Boudica; 1898: Marquette Iron Range
- Owner: 1897: Wilson & Furness; 1898: Atlantic Transport Line
- Operator: 1897: Williams, Torrey & Feild; 1905: Red Star Line
- Port of registry: West Hartlepool
- Route: 1898: London – New York; 1901; 1905: Antwerp – Philadelphia
- Builder: A Stephen & Sons, Linthouse
- Yard number: 373
- Launched: 25 November 1897
- Completed: January 1898
- Maiden voyage: 15 January 1898
- Identification: UK official number 106972; code letters PWKQ; by 1913: call sign MNQ
- Fate: sunk by torpedo, 23 October 1915

General characteristics
- Type: livestock and passenger ship
- Tonnage: 7,057 GRT, 4,536 NRT
- Length: 486.5 ft (148.3 m)
- Beam: 52.3 ft (15.9 m)
- Depth: 31.3 ft (9.5 m)
- Decks: 3
- Installed power: 1 × triple-expansion engine; 770 NHP; 4,300 ihp
- Propulsion: 1 × screw
- Sail plan: 4-masted schooner
- Speed: 14 knots (26 km/h)
- Capacity: 120 × 1st class passengers; plus 800 × cattle
- Crew: peacetime: 70; wartime: 95
- Sensors & processing systems: by 1910: submarine signalling
- Notes: one of five sister ships

SS Marquette was a UK transatlantic cargo liner. She was launched in Scotland in 1897 as Boadicea, and made her maiden voyage from Glasgow to New York in 1898. Later that year she changed owners, and was renamed Marquette.

The ship was designed to carry 120 first class passengers and 800 cattle, and to cross the North Atlantic in ten days. She was built for Wilson and Furness, for use in the Wilson and Furness-Leyland Line (W&FL) joint service. However, within months of her completion, Atlantic Transport Line (ATL) bought her. She spent almost her entire career in ATL ownership.

She became a troopship in the First World War. In 1915, a German U-boat sank her by torpedo in the Aegean, killing 167 of the people aboard her. Most of the victims were members of the British Royal Artillery. Another 32 were from New Zealand, including ten women nurses.

== A class of five cargo liners ==
The ship was the fourth of a class of five single-screw steamships built for members of the Wilson and Furness-Leyland Line (W&FL) in 1897 and 1898. Previous W&FL ships had all been purely cargo ships to carry livestock. The five new ships were each designed to carry more than 100 passengers, all in first class berths.

W&FL members ordered the five ships from four different shipyards. Alexander Stephen and Sons in Linthouse, Glasgow built the first and fourth members of the class as yard numbers 372 and 373. 372 was launched on 3 August 1897, and completed as Alexandra. 373 was launched on 25 November 1897, and completed in 1898 as Boadicea. The second member of the class was Victoria, launched by Furness, Withy & Co in West Hartlepool on 31 August 1897. The third was Winifreda, launched by Harland & Wolff in Belfast on 11 September 1897. The final ship of the class to be built was Cleopatra, which was launched by Earle's Shipbuilding in Hull on 6 April 1898.

== Building and registration ==
Boadicea's registered length was 486.5 ft (148.3 m), her beam was 52.3 ft (15.9 m); and her depth was 31.3 ft (9.5 m). She had first class berths for 120 passengers, and her holds could accommodate 800 head of cattle. Her tonnages were 6,833 GRT and 4,423 NRT. She had a single, three-bladed screw, driven by a three-cylinder triple-expansion engine that was rated at 770 NHP or 4,300 ihp, and gave her a speed of 14 knots (26 km/h). She had four masts, and was rigged as a schooner.

Boadicea's owners were Wilson & Furness, who registered her in West Hartlepool. Her UK official number was 106972, and her code letters were PWKQ. On 15 January 1898 she left Glasgow on her maiden voyage to New York, where she arrived on 28 January. Her sailing from Glasgow was a one-off, and the regular port at the British end of her route was London.

== From Boadicea to Marquette ==
While Boadicea was entering service, Atlantic Transport Line (ATL) was negotiating to buy her and all of her sisters from W&FL, including the uncompleted Cleopatra. Negotiations gained impetus after 21 April 1898, when the Spanish–American War began. ATL sold seven of its ships to the United States Government, and donated another as a hospital ship. In order to replace them, it increased its offer to W&FL to £968,000 for the five ships. The sale of the five ships, plus the W&FL's office in London and berth in New York, was finalised on 21 July. After the sale, Boadicea made one transatlantic trip from London to New York and back, starting on 7 July 1898, before her new owners renamed her.

ATL renamed all of the ships it bought from W&FL. Alexandra became Menominee; Victoria became Manitou; Winifreda became Mesaba; Boadicea became Marquette; and Cleopatra became Mohegan. The Menominee Range, Mesabi Range, and Marquette Iron Range are all iron ore deposits around Lake Superior. All five ships remained registered in the UK. Mohegan was wrecked and lost in October 1898. The remaining four ships continued to run between London and New York, where they served a pier at the foot of West Houston Street.

== Broken propeller ==
On 8 February 1901, Marquette left London with 39 passengers on a voyage to New York. At 01:30 hrs on 14 February, one of the blades fell off her propeller. The imbalance of the remaining two blades caused the ship to vibrate, waking any of her passengers and crew who were asleep. She reduced speed to mitigate the vibration, but at 10:00 hrs on 15 February a second blade fell off, leaving her with only one blade to continue under way.

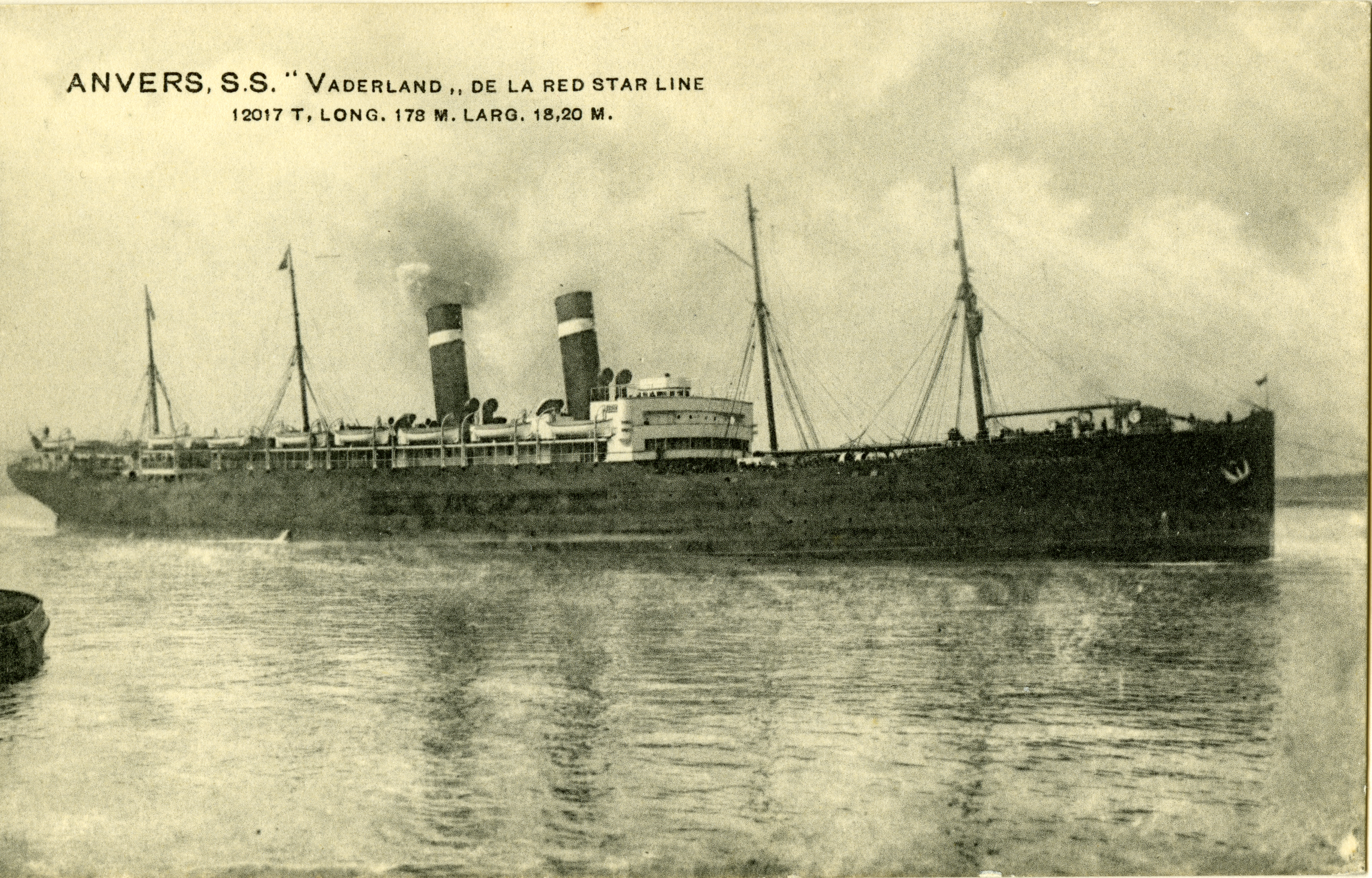
Vaderland, which brought to New York the news that Marquette had sustained propeller damage

On 17 February, the American Line steamship Vaderland sighted Marquette off Newfoundland, proceeding at reduced speed. Marquette signalled Vaderland "Lost two blades; please report me to my owners." Vaderland offered to tow her, but Marquette declined, stating that she was making 10 knots (19 km/h), and would reach New York the next day.

However, that afternoon, Marquette accepted a tow from Manitou, one of her sister ships. At dusk, the line parted due to a rough sea. Overnight, a gale arose, preventing a line from being restored. Marquette continued to make slow headway; Manitou continued to stand by her; and on 19 February, a tow line between them was restored. Two days later, when the two ships were 30 nautical miles (56 km) east of Nantucket, this line also parted. From then on, Manitou simply shadowed Marquette, until they sighted Fire Island. Manitou then resumed full speed, and left Marquette to enter New York at reduced speed. After disembarking her passengers, Marquette was dry docked in Erie Basin for repairs, and passengers for her delayed eastbound sailing were transferred to Manitou.

== Red Star Line and modernisation ==
ATL twice loaned Marquette to Red Star Line to work its route between Antwerp and Philadelphia. The first occasion was in 1901, and the second was in September 1905.

By 1910, Marquette was equipped with submarine signalling and wireless telegraph. The Marconi Company supplied and operated her wireless equipment. By 1913, her call sign was MNQ.

== Loss ==
In 1914, the Admiralty chartered Marquette as a military transport. She was in Admiralty service for more than a year.

On 19 October 1915, Marquette left Alexandria in Egypt for Salonika (now Thessaloniki), carrying a total of 741 people and 541 animals. The largest contingent was ten officers and 439 other ranks of the ammunition column of the British 29th Division. There were also 12 officers, 36 nurses and 143 other ranks of the No 1 Stationary Hospital; six Egyptians; and 491 mules and 50 horses. Her Master was Captain John Findlay, and her complement was 95 officers and men. The British authorities had sent the Stationary Hospital aboard Marquette, despite the unladen British hospital ship Grantully Castle having left the same port, for the same destination, on the same day.

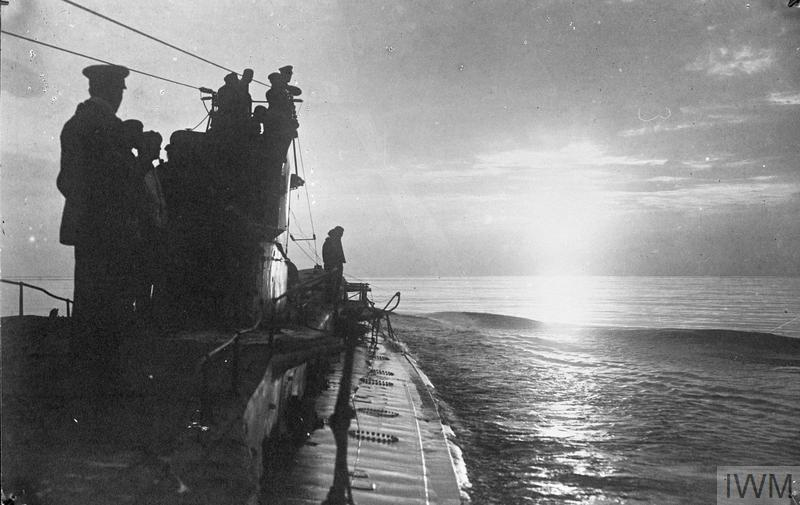
U-35 in the Mediterranean in 1917

A French Navy destroyer escorted Marquette until the night of 22 October. For the first two days of the voyage, Marquette held lifeboat drills. However, one of the New Zealand nurses later wrote "we hardly took it seriously I am afraid". At 09:15 hrs on 23 October, 36 nautical miles (67 km) south of Salonika, U-35 hit her starboard side with a single torpedo. Marquette rapidly listed to port, and sank within seven to 15 minutes.

The torpedo exploded through the accommodation of some of the troops on the starboard side of the ship; killing some men, and wounding others. Troops and nurses donned their lifejackets, and went to their boat stations quietly and in good order. The nurses formed two groups: 18 each to the port and starboard sides of the boat deck.

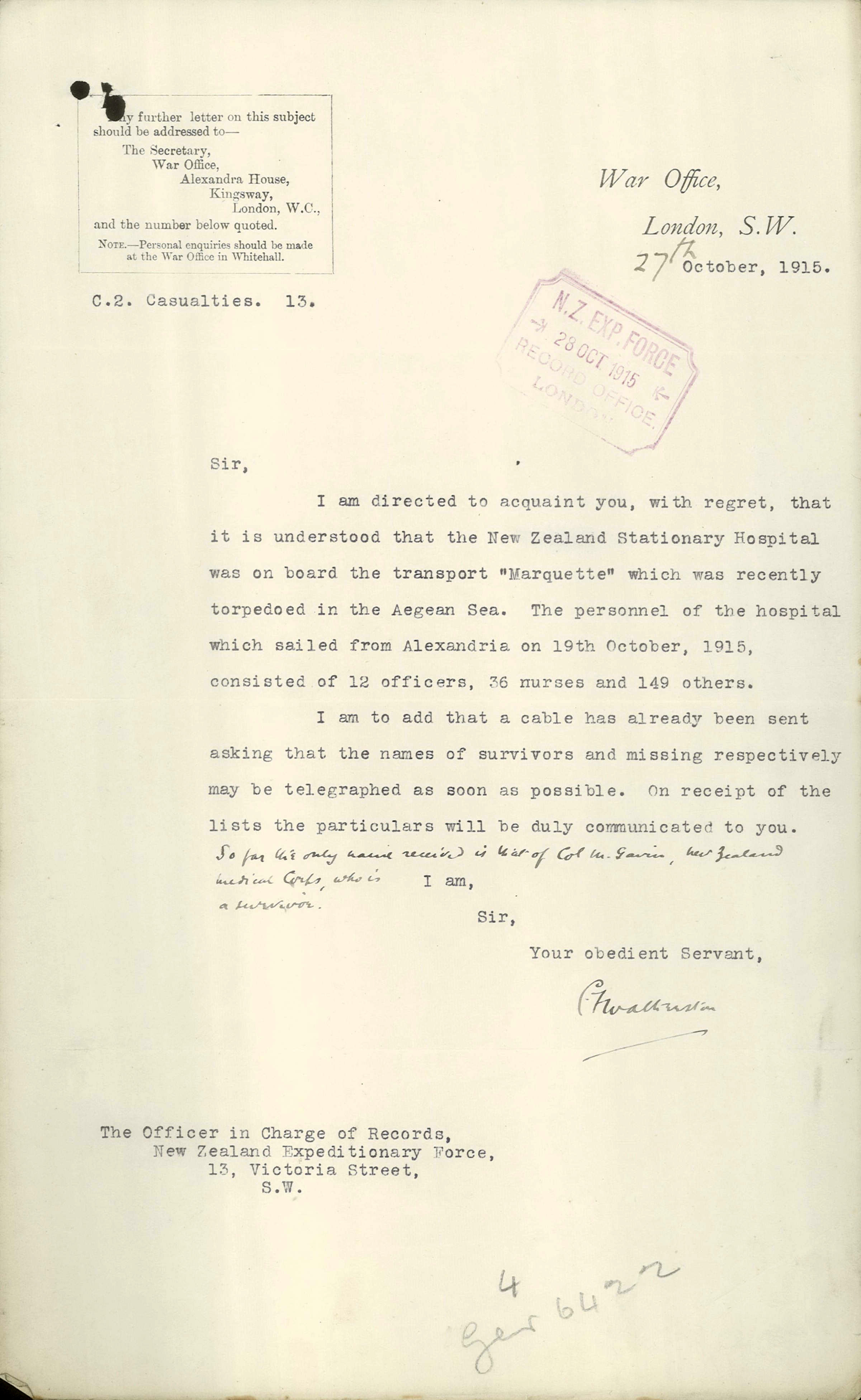
Letter dated 27 October 1915 from the War Office stating that personnel of the New Zealand Stationary Hospital were aboard Marquette when she was sunk

On the starboard side, their lifeboat was lowered not by members of the crew, but by soldiers inexperienced in handling lifeboat davits. They lowered one of the falls more rapidly than the other; tipping five of the 18 nurses out of the boat and into the sea. At the time, all five were rescued and returned to the boat, but one nurse was later found to be missing. On the port side, the lifeboat carrying some of the nurses was lowered into the water, but then another boat was lowered on top of it. Several of the nurses were injured, and later died either of their injuries, or of being unable to survive in the water. Other nurses on the port side were left aboard ship. One later wrote "While standing on the deck, I saw a boat load of men in uniform getting away. I wondered why we nurses were left on deck, without a chance of getting into a boat. I really owe my life to the chief officer of the Marquette, he picked me up during the afternoon and put me in a boat." The lifeboats seem to have suffered from instability, with reports of at least some of them repeatedly capsizing, and becoming swamped. Marquette sank before all of them could be launched. Many survivors clung to floating wreckage, or floated unaided as best they could.

Marquette's wireless officer succeeded in transmitting an SOS signal before the ship sank. However, about 30 minutes later, a stronger SOS signal was transmitted from a different position, which confused rescuers. U-35 was later suspected of having transmitted the second SOS as a decoy. Rescuing craft went to the position given by the stronger signal, with the result that they did not reach Marquette's survivors until about nine hours after the sinking. By then, many of those in the water, or cold and wet in the lifeboats, had died of hypothermia or injuries.

== Rescue ==
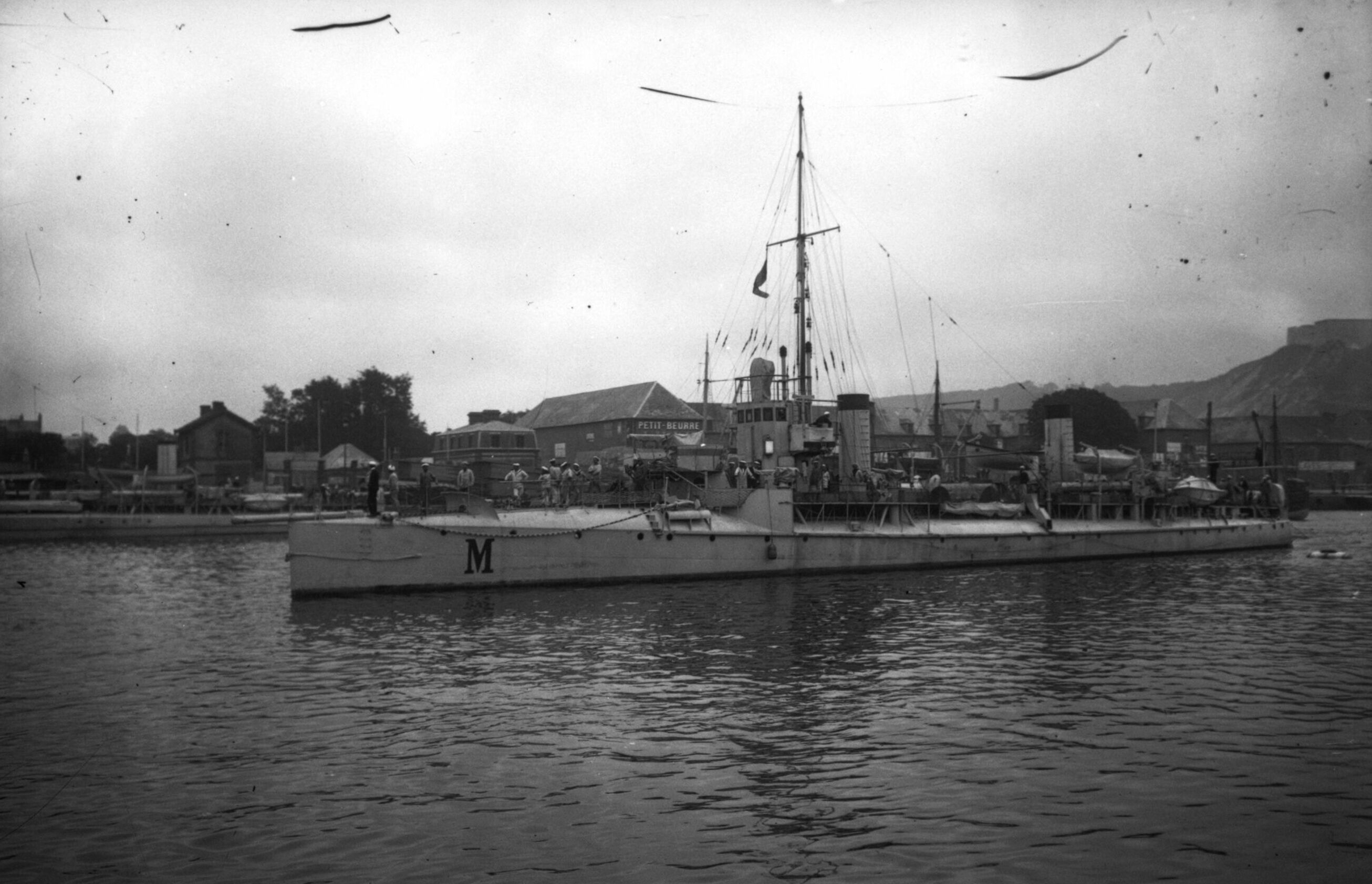
The French destroyer Mortier

Eventually, the French destroyers Mortier and Tirailleur, and the Royal Navy minesweeper HMS Lynn, found and rescued survivors, and recovered the bodies of some of the dead. Mortier and Tirailleur transferred survivors to the French hospital ship Canada, which was a converted Fabre Liner. Lynn was converted from the Great Western Railway ferry Lynx. According to one account written in 2015, HMHS Grantully Castle, which was a Union-Castle Liner, converted into a 552-bed hospital ship, also rescued survivors. What is more certain is that Grantully Castle returned some of the survivors to Egypt.

A total of 167 people were killed: either when the torpedo hit Marquette; as a result of accidents while abandoning ship; or from hypothermia or drowning before being rescued. They included 128 troops; 29 members of the crew; and 10 nurses. Most of the victims were British; members of the Royal Horse Artillery (RHA) and Royal Garrison Artillery (RGA). Some sources give the total killed as only 29. This seems to be an error, mistaking the number of civilian crew members killed for the total number of dead.

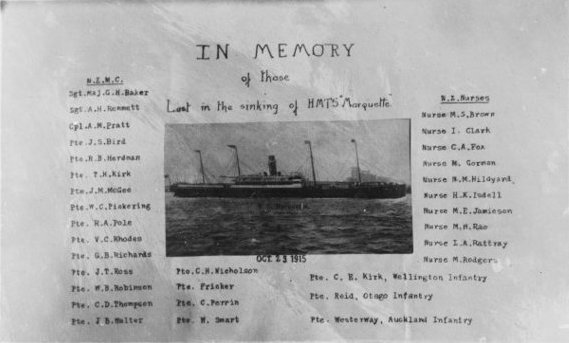
Postcard in memory of the 32 New Zealanders killed in Marquette's sinking

32 New Zealand nationals were killed, including 21 Royal New Zealand Army Medical Corps orderlies, and ten New Zealand Army Nursing Service staff nurses: Marion Brown, Isabel Clark, Catherine Fox, Mary Gorman, Nona Hildyard, Helena Isdell, Mabel Jamieson, Mary Rae, Lorna Rattray, and Margaret Rogers. Nine of the ten nurses were from South Island, including three from Christchurch. Their Matron, Miss Cameron, survived, but never fully recovered from her injuries, and later retired to a private hospital in Sydney, New South Wales. Other New Zealand survivors included the surgeons Hugh Acland and Ebenezer Teichelmann, and the nurses Jean Erwin, Minnie Jeffery, and Mary Looney.

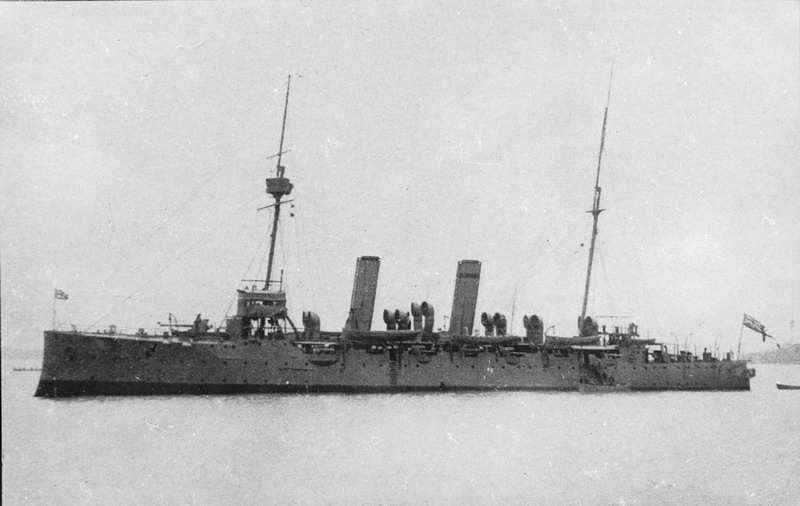
The protected cruiser HMS Talbot

== Inquiry ==
On 26 October 1915, a Naval Court of Inquiry was held aboard the protected cruiser HMS Talbot in Salonika Harbour. Its report, dated 3 November, found no-one to be at fault. However, there was public outrage in New Zealand. The Governor-General of New Zealand, the Earl of Liverpool, told the UK War Office that he wanted the future transport of medical personnel to be by hospital ship if at all possible.

== Monuments ==
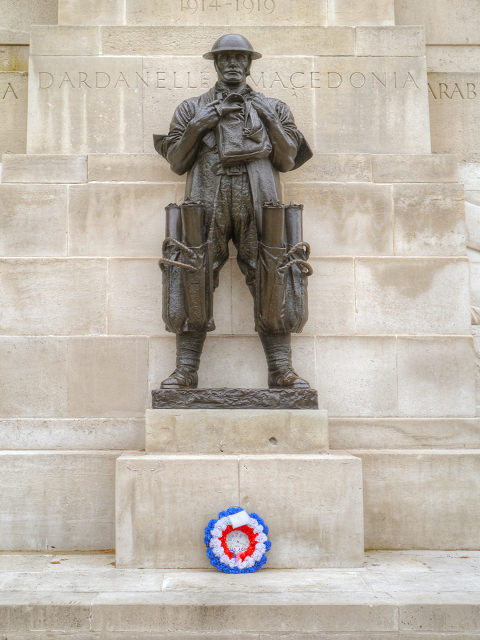
The part of the Royal Artillery Memorial in London that commemorates artillerymen who served in the Macedonian front and in the Dardanelles campaign. Most of the people killed in Marquette's sinking were artillerymen.

Some of the bodies recovered from the sinking are buried in Mikra British Cemetery in Thessaloniki, including four soldiers and two nurses. An engraved gold watch identified one of the nurses as Margaret Rogers. The other wore a military identity disc, but could not be identified, as the Stationary Hospital's records were lost with the ship. The bodies of most of the dead were not recovered. Their names are among those inscribed on three of the stone plaques that adjoin the Cross of Sacrifice in Mikra British Cemetery.

Three monuments in London include different victims of the sinking. The Royal Artillery Memorial at Hyde Park Corner, dedicated in 1925, includes all UK artillerymen killed in the First World War, including those RHA and RGA members aboard Marquette. The Mercantile Marine War Memorial at Tower Hill, dedicated in 1928, lists by name the members of Marquette's civilian crew who were killed. The Animals in War Memorial in Hyde Park, dedicated in 2004, commemorates all animals killed in wars, including the 541 horses and mules aboard Marquette.

At Christchurch Hospital on South Island, a Nurses' Memorial Chapel was built in 1927, as a monument to the three Christchurch nurses killed in the Marquette sinking, and also two nurses who died from treating patients in the Spanish flu pandemic. A wooden plaque in the chapel is inscribed with the names 16 nurses, including all 10 of those killed in the Marquette sinking.

== Wreck ==
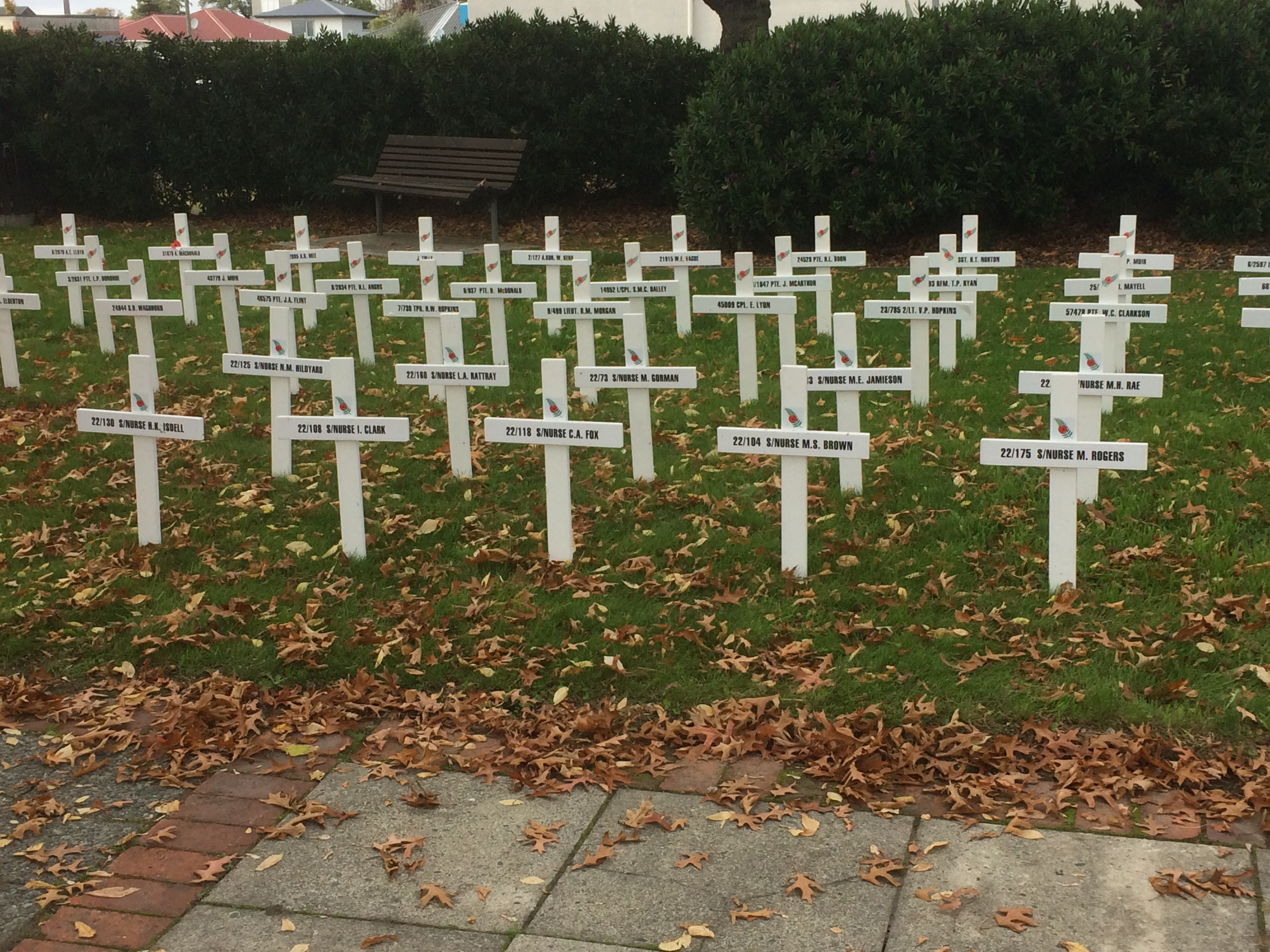
Crosses for the 2017 Anzac Day Parade in Papanui, Christchurch. Those in the front two rows bear the names of the ten nurses killed in the Marquette sinking.

Divers found and identified Marquette's wreck in 2009. It is in the Thermaic Gulf, about 12 nautical miles (23 km) off the Greek coast, at a depth of 285 feet (87 m). The UK Embassy in Athens issued a protection order for the wreck.

== Centenary ==
In New Zealand, centenary commemorations were held in October 2015. An historical display, memorial service, and lecture were held and St Margaret's College, Christchurch; and a stage play based on the Marquette story, "Roses of No Man's Land", was performed. In Waimate, a memorial service was held, and a commemorative plaque was unveiled.

== See also ==
- HMT Aragon: a troopship sunk off Alexandria in 1917, in which the victims included six VAD nursing auxiliaries

== Bibliography ==
- Burrell, David (1992). Furness Withy 1891–1991. Kendal: World Ship Society. ISBN 0-905617-70-3.
- Haws, Duncan (1979). The Ships of the Cunard, American, Red Star, Inman, Leyland, Dominion, Atlantic Transport and White Star lines. Merchant Fleets in Profile. Vol. 2. Cambridge: Patrick Stephens Ltd. ISBN 0-85059-324-7.
- Lloyd's Register of British and Foreign Shipping. Vol. I.–Steamers. London: Lloyd's Register of Shipping. 1898 – via Internet Archive.
- Lloyd's Register of British and Foreign Shipping. Vol. I.–Steamers. London: Lloyd's Register of Shipping. 1910 – via Internet Archive.
- Lloyd's Register of British and Foreign Shipping. Vol. II.–Steamers. London: Lloyd's Register of Shipping. 1912 – via Internet Archive.
- The Marconi Press Agency Ltd (1913). The Year Book of Wireless Telegraphy and Telephony. London: The St Katherine Press.
- Mercantile Navy List. London: Registrar General of Shipping and Seamen. 1899 – via Crew List Index Project.
- Maclean, Hester (1932). "XXXVIII. Arrival in New Zealand and News of Marquette Disaster". Nursing in New Zealand: History and Reminiscences. Wellington: Tolan Printing Company – via National Library of New Zealand and Victoria University of Wellington.
- Prentice, Alex (4 January 1916). "Marquette Disaster". Marlborough Express. Blenheim, NZ. p. 3 – via Papers Past.
- Smith, JM (1990). Cloud over Marquette. Christchurch: JM Smith. ISBN 978-0473010812.
