= Nurses' Memorial Chapel =

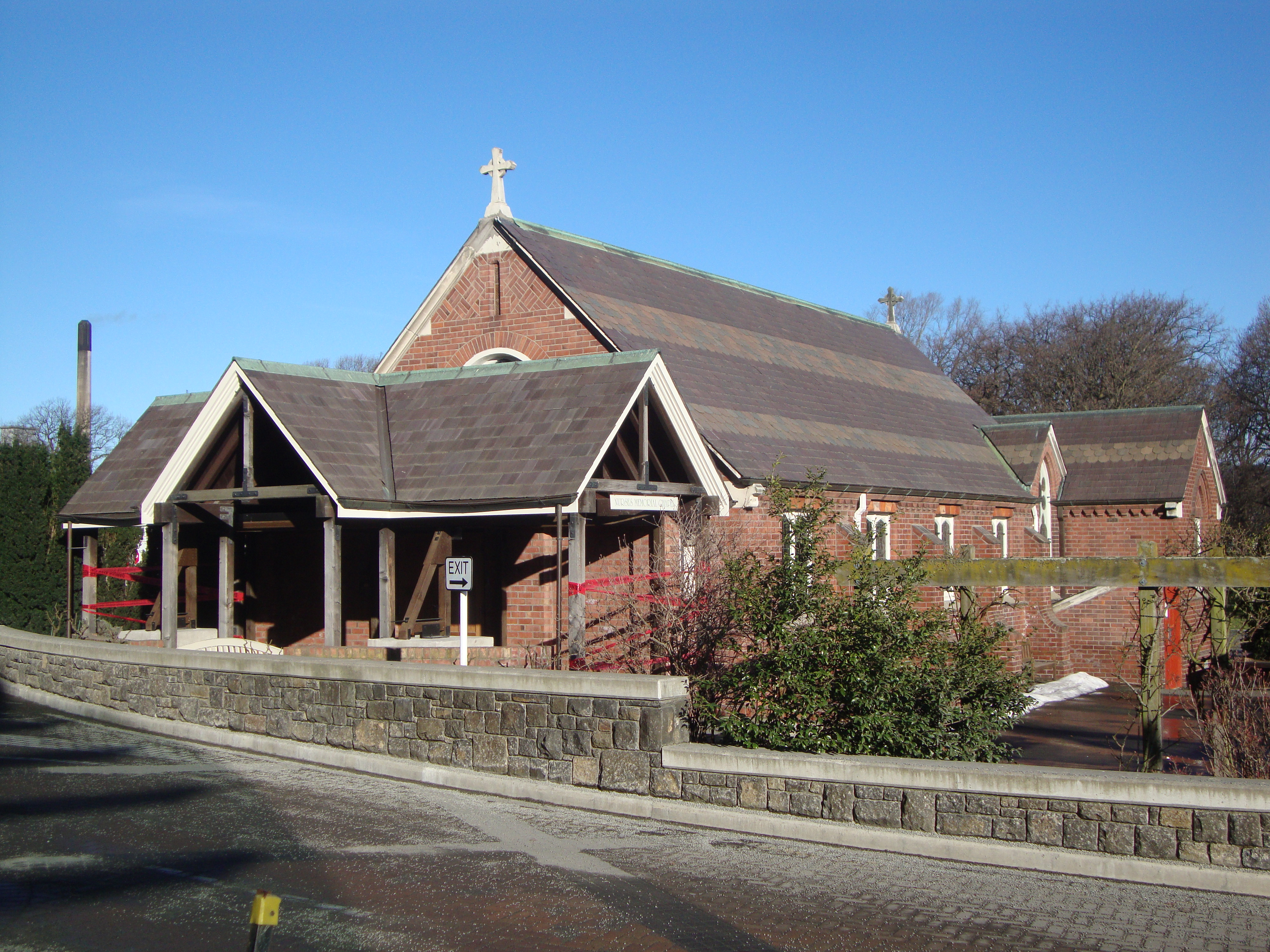
- The Nurses Memorial Chapel following the February 2011 earthquake
- Nurses' Memorial Chapel
- 43.53419°S 172.62429°E
- Location: Christchurch Hospital, Christchurch Central City, Christchurch
- Country: New Zealand
- Denomination: interdenominational
- Website: cnmc.org.nz

History
- Status: closed due to damage sustained in the 2010 Canterbury earthquake

Heritage New Zealand – Category 1
- Designated: 20 July 1989
- Reference no.: 1851

The Nurses' Memorial Chapel at Christchurch Hospital, New Zealand, is registered as a Category I heritage building. The chapel is significant as New Zealand's first hospital chapel, and as the country's only World War I memorial solely dedicated to women, and is worldwide the only hospital chapel dedicated to nurses who died in World War I.

== History ==
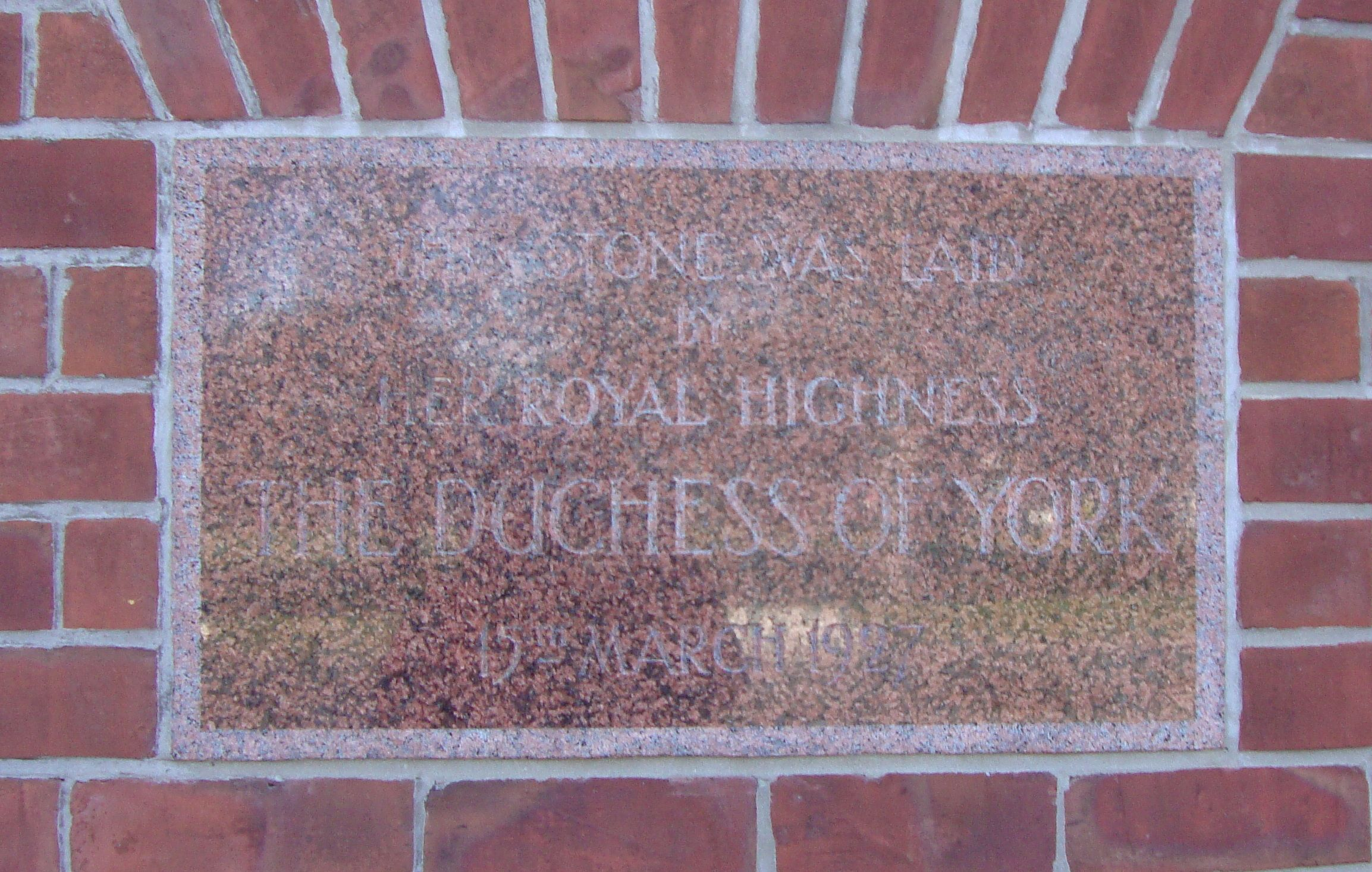
The foundation stone shows the name of the Duchess of York, but her husband stood in for her as she was ill that day

Sibylla Maude and Mabel Thurston, both former matrons of Christchurch Hospital, first thought of a chapel at the hospital. Rose Muir, the matron from 1919 to 1936, wrote to the hospital board in July 1924 reiterating the need for a chapel. This request was approved in principle in January 1925. The hospital board provided the land and paid for the foundation and the basement, and was in turn granted the use of the basement. The Ministry of Health did not permit the hospital board to fund any other part of the building, and the government did not provide any of the funds either, but suggested that the public should fund the chapel. A fundraising campaign commenced in November 1925.

The foundation stone was laid on 15 March 1927 by the Duke of York. The foundation stone shows the name of the Duchess of York, but she was ill on the day and her husband stood in for her. The chapel was built during 1927 to a design by John Goddard Collins (1886–1965) of Collins and Harman, who offered his time free of charge.

The first service was held on Christmas Day of 1927. The chapel is dedicated to nurses who died during World War I, and to nurses who died during the 1918 flu pandemic. Three Christchurch nurses—Nona Hildyard, Margaret Rogers and Lorna Rattray—died when the troopship SS Marquette was sunk in 1915 by a German submarine. Two Christchurch nurses—Grace Beswick and Hilda Hooker—died during the flu pandemic.

=== Threats of demolition ===
In the mid-1970s, the hospital board proposed to demolish the chapel to make way for additional operating theatres. This was met with strong opposition, and the hospital board found a solution that left the chapel in place. The next threat of demolition occurred in the 1980s and was again met with strong opposition, with the New Zealand Historic Places Trust issuing a protection notice in August 1989. Subsequently, the hospital board leased the building to Christchurch City Council, and it is administered by a trust and cared for by a group that calls itself 'Friends of the Chapel'.

=== Earthquakes ===
The chapel was closed after 4 September 2010 Canterbury earthquake had damaged the building. It suffered additional damage in subsequent earthquakes. In October 2011, the Canterbury District Health Board announced that the chapel would be repaired, after demolition had been considered. Work to restore the chapel began in September 2017 and despite some unforeseen setbacks, was completed to schedule in August 2018. It was re-opened by the Governor General Dame Patsy Reddy on 27 October 2018.

== Architecture ==
Collins chose the Arts and Crafts architectural style for the building, with the walls made of exposed brick inside and out, and timberwork on the inside. The timber includes Oregon panelling, and blackwood and oak parquet floor. There are carvings in the sanctuary by Frederick Gurnsey and Jack Vivian. In the early 1990s, a porch was added to the chapel.

=== Stained glass windows ===
Name of window	Designer	Dedicated to	Unveiling
The Angel of Charity and a Waif	Veronica Whall	Mary Ewart, first qualified nurse at Christchurch Hospital; Matron, 1898–1908	Bishop West Watson, 1933
Faith and a Sick Child	Veronica Whall	Sybilla Maude (Nurse Maude), founder of the Nurse Maude Association	Archbishop Julius, 1936
Christ and Children	Veronica Whall	Annie Pattrick, wartime nurse and supporter of the early Plunket Society	Chaplain Henry Williams, 1939
The Angel of Hope	Veronica Whall	Pioneer nurses	Bishop Warren, 1953
The Conversion of St Paul	Francis Spear	Mabel Thurston, wartime nurse and Matron of Christchurch Hospital 1908–1916	Bishop Warren, 1964
St Agatha	Francis Spear	Mary Christmas, Marquette survivor and first nursing tutor at the Christchurch Preliminary School of Nursing	Marquette survivors Jean Erwin and Emily Hodges,1968
St. Faith	Francis Spear	Rose Muir, Matron of Christchurch Hospital 1916 – 1936	Grace Widdowson, 1971
Lamb of God & The Dove of Peace	Gifted from the former St. Mary's Church, Merivale		
Poppy's Remembrance	Suzanne Johnson	Poppy Blaythwayt, home sister at Christchurch Hospital Nurses' Home, 1950s and 1960s	2000
Nurses' Memorial Window	Stephen Belanger-Taylor	First and Second World War nurses	

== Heritage registration ==
The New Zealand Historic Places Trust registered the building with registration number 1851 on 20 July 1989. The chapel is significant as New Zealand's first hospital chapel, and as the country's only World War I memorial solely dedicated to women, and is worldwide the only hospital chapel dedicated to nurses who died in World War I.
