= Mikra British Cemetery =

Cemetery in Thessaloniki, Greece

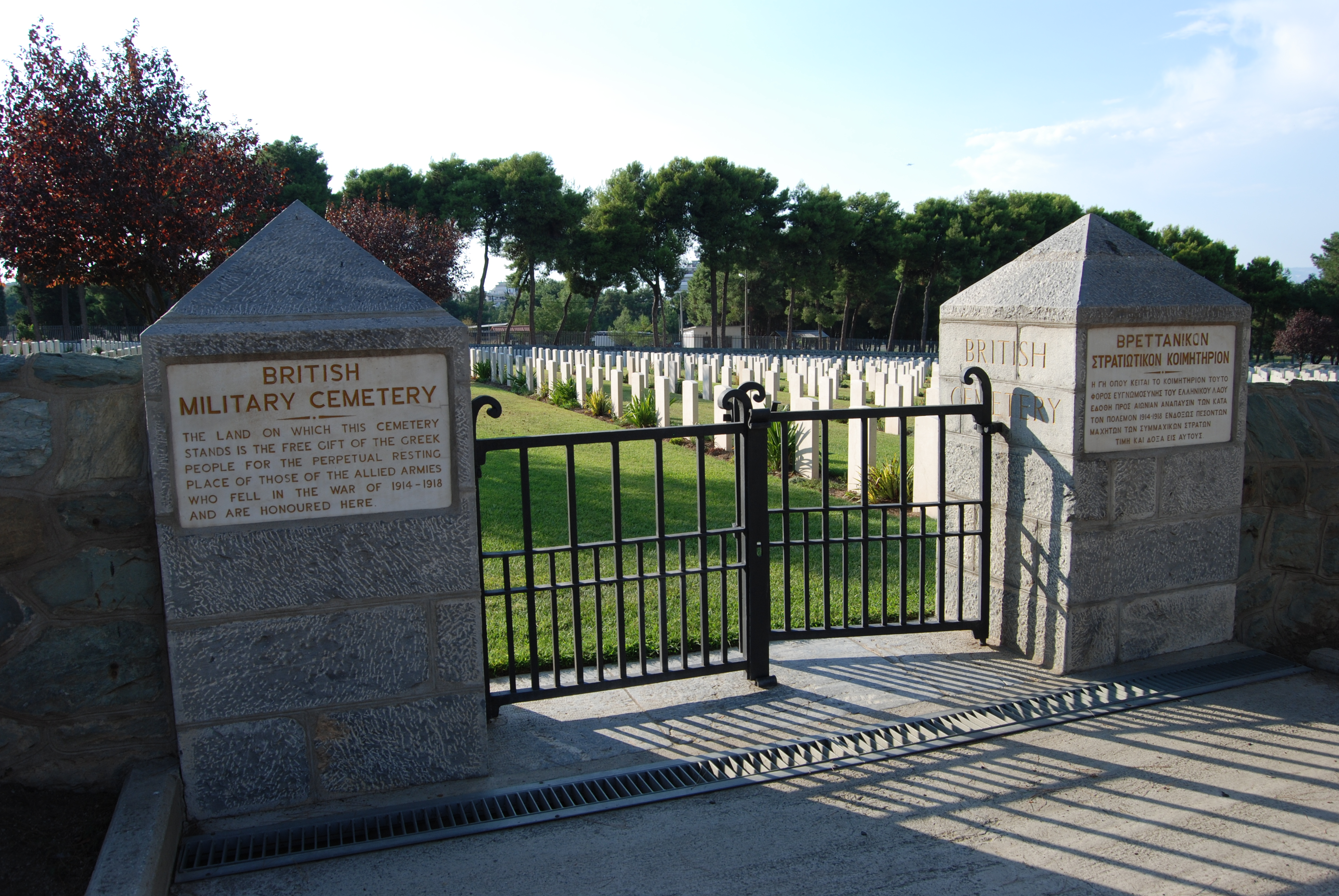
- War graves cemetery
- Interactive map of Mikra British Cemetery

Details
- Established: 1917
- Location: Kalamaria, Thessaloniki
- Country: Greece
- Coordinates: 40.5784°N 22.9649°E
- Type: Commonwealth cemetery
- Owned by: Commonwealth War Graves Commission
- No. of graves: 1,957
- Find a Grave: Mikra British Cemetery

The Mikra British Cemetery is a World War I-era British military cemetery in Kalamaria, a suburb of the city of Thessaloniki in Greece. It was opened in April 1917, and used until 1920. Following the Armistice the cemetery was greatly enlarged when remains were transferred there from other local burial grounds. It is maintained by the Commonwealth War Graves Commission.

== Location ==
The cemetery is in Kalamaria, a district of Thessaloniki, it is located between the army camp of Dalipi and the communal Greek cemetery in Kalamaria, off Konstantinou Karamanli Street.

== History ==
During the First World War, Thessaloniki had been the headquarters of the British Salonika Force, containing eighteen various hospitals. Three of the hospitals in Thessaloniki were Canadian though no Canadian soldiers were members of the Commonwealth force.

Commonwealth forces had been interred in local Protestant and Roman Catholic cemeteries, prior to the opening of the Mikra cemetery. Additionally the Anglo-French Military Cemetery, on the Lembet Road, was used from November 1915 to October 1918.

The cemetery holds 1,810 Commonwealth burials of the First World War, and 147 other war graves from other nationalities.

The Mikra Memorial within the cemetery commemorates almost 500 members of the Commonwealth forces, including nurses and officers, who were killed when their troop transports and hospital ships were sunk in the Mediterranean Sea. The identified victims from these ships are buried in Thessaloniki.
