= Alice Holford =

Nurse, midwife, hospital matron

Alice Hannah Holford (12 November 1867 – 22 December 1966) was a New Zealand nurse, midwife and hospital matron.

== Early life ==
Holford was born in New Plymouth, Taranaki, New Zealand. Her parents were Captain J.A. Holford, Port Taranaki's harbour master, and Alice Holford, née Brooking. She applied to be a probationer (trainee nurse) at New Plymouth Hospital in 1886, however the hospital was not ready to train nursing staff and her father was also reluctant to allow her to train. As a result, she had to wait until 1897 to be admitted, during which time she helped her family with raising siblings and cousins, and went out with the local doctors on their rounds. She graduated in 1901, the fourth nurse to be trained at the hospital.

== Career ==
Holford was determined to nurse babies, however there was no suitable training available in New Zealand at the time. So, in 1902 she borrowed money and travelled to Sydney to train as a midwife at Crown Street Women's Hospital. She was criticised for this by nursing colleagues who thought that it was inappropriate for an unmarried woman to deliver babies.

On her return to New Zealand, she worked with Grace Neill to establish the St Helens Hospitals as training schools for midwives, and to have legislation passed to register midwives. The first St. Helen's Hospital was opened in Wellington in 1905, followed by Dunedin two months later. Holford was appointed the founding matron of the Dunedin hospital, and held this position until her retirement in December 1927 at the age of 60.

Her duties as matron were considerable - she oversaw all deliveries, and managed midwifery training for nurses, trainee midwives, and medical students. She had to deal with opposition to the hospital's existence, as midwifery training was new and unestablished in the country at the time. Some doctors feared that trained midwives would compete with them for patients, and some older nurses, as well as the public, thought it was unseemly for young unmarried women to deliver babies.

In 1914 Holford was one of a group of nurses who approached the Minister of Defence, James Allen, and suggested that New Zealand send nurses to assist in World War I. The deputation was successful, and led to the development of the New Zealand Army Nursing Service. During the war years, Holford was matron of the Hanmer Convalescent Home for Soldiers in Hanmer Springs, North Canterbury. She later returned to take charge at Queen Mary Hospital in Hanmer Springs after World War 2.

Holford was active in a number of nursing and community organisations. In 1907 she founded a nursing group in Dunedin which later became a branch of the New Zealand Nurses' Association. She served as vice-president and president and was made an honorary life vice-president on her retirement from St. Helen's in 1927. She was a committee member for the New Zealand Nurses' Memorial Fund in the 1920s. Holford was also a founding member of the Plunket Society and was involved with the Order of St. John, Otago Pioneer Women's Society, the National Council of Women and the Red Cross. In her later years, she was instrumental in Dunedin opening a Citizens' Day Nursery for children, and a women's rest room in the city centre.

Holford retired in 1927. In 1956, she suffered a fall while in New Plymouth for a nursing conference, and was admitted to Westown Hospital. She remained there until her death in 1966, aged 99.
