= St Helens Hospitals, New Zealand =

New Zealand maternity hospitals

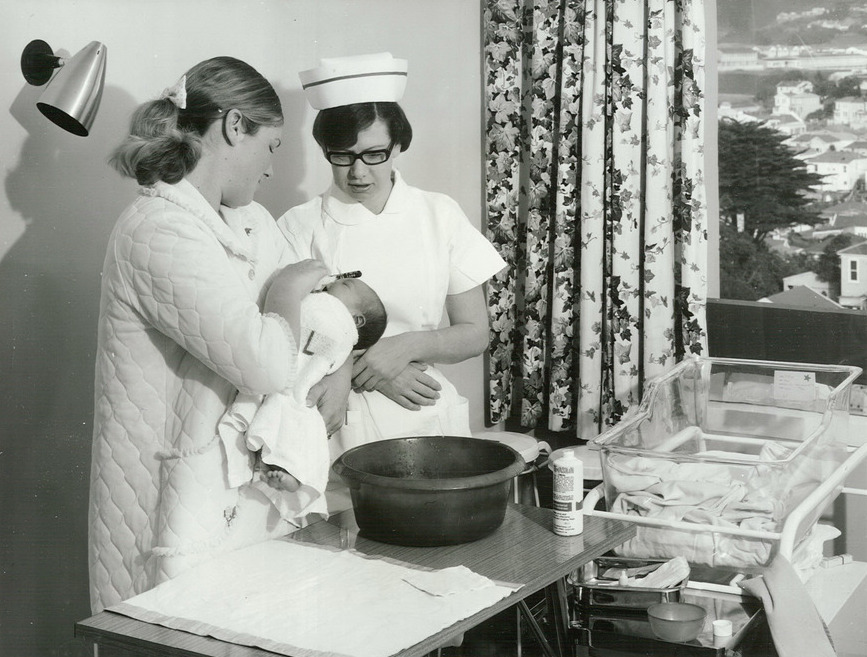
A nurse assisting a mother with a newborn baby at St Helens Hospital, Wellington (1970)

The St Helens Hospitals were maternity hospitals located in seven New Zealand cities. They were the first state-run maternity hospitals in the world offering both midwifery services and midwifery training. The first hospital opened in 1905 in Wellington and the last one in Wanganui in 1921. The services of the St Helens Hospitals were gradually incorporated into other hospitals and the last hospital to close was in Auckland in 1990.

== History ==
The 1904 Midwives Act enacted the training and registration of midwives in New Zealand and their supervision and regulation by the Health Department. This was followed by the establishment of seven state-owned maternity hospitals named after St Helens in Lancashire, England the birthplace of the Prime Minister Richard Seddon. There were St Helens Hospitals in Auckland, Christchurch, Dunedin, Gisborne, Invercargill, Wanganui and Wellington. Their purpose was to train midwives and provide maternity care for the wives of working men. Although the hospitals were state run they were not free. They catered for married women whose husbands earned less than £4 a week and who could contribute towards their care. They also provided a district maternity services for women who gave birth at home. The hospitals were run by midwives with no resident doctors and the medical superintendent did not live on site.

Grace Neill was the Assistant Inspector of Hospitals for the Department of Health and oversaw the establishment of the hospitals in Wellington, Auckland and Dunedin. Hester Maclean took over as Assistant Inspector from Neill in 1906 and continued to establish more hospitals in Christchurch, Gisborne, Wanganui and Invercargill.

The first St Helens opened in Wellington in 1905 and the last was in Wanganui in 1921.

After the Wanganui St Helens opened the government, under the Director General of Health Thomas Valintine, decided that it would not continue to set up more St Helens. Hospital boards were expected to provide maternity annexes or maternity hospitals attached to their general hospitals. However some St Helens continued to be run by midwives and the Department of Health until the 1960s when control moved to the Hospital Boards.

=== Wellington ===
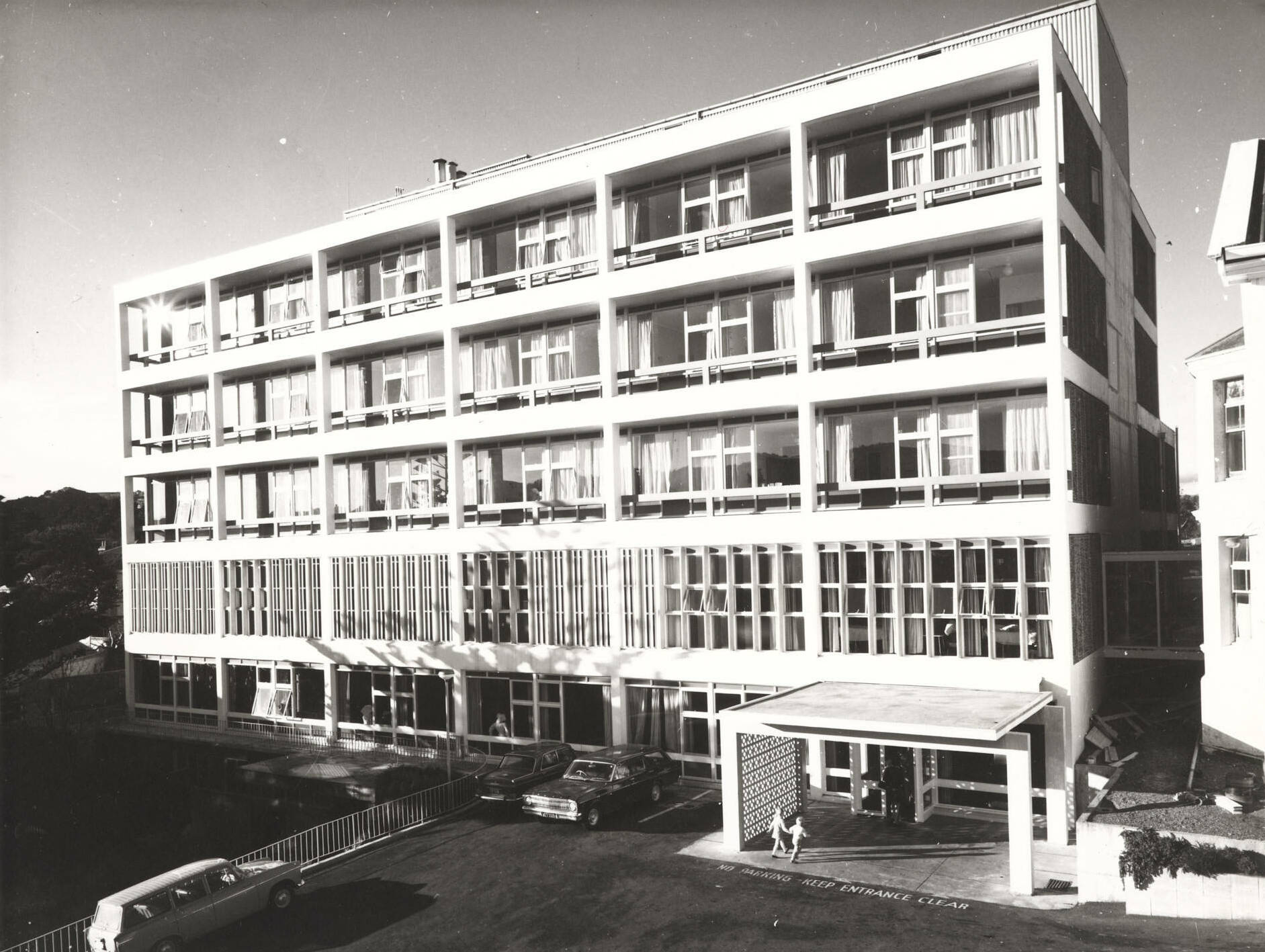
St Helens Maternity Hospital in Wellington, pictured in 1970

Grace Neill, who was Assistant Inspector of Hospital and committed to improving maternity services and health care for mothers and babies, set up the first St Helens in 1905. Neill found premises in Rintoul St, Newtown, equipped the building and hired a matron and sub-matron in the space of three weeks; the hospital opened on 29 May 1905. However the building was not suitable and the hospital relocated to a larger building at 38A Colombo St, Newtown in September 1908. This building proved too small and in 1909 a new site was acquired but this too was regarded as unsuitable and another site was purchased at 109 Coromandel Street, Newtown in 1910. The hospital, which was designed by the Public Works Department, opened on 2 July 1912 and could accommodate 30 patients.

A new maternity hospital building was built at Wellington Hospital in 1965, and control of St Helens transferred to the Wellington Hospital Board in 1966. Twelve years later it was decided that St Helens would close and its services were moved to Wellington Women's Hospital. This was met with opposition to the medicalisation of birth in the new hospital and the reduction of women's right to choose the type of birth and post-natal care they desired. The St Helens building remained empty for eleven years and was finally sold to private developers for conversion to apartments.

=== Dunedin ===
The Dunedin St Helens opened on 30 September 1905 at 9 Regent Rd, Dunedin. It closed in January 1938 when the Queen Mary Maternity Hospital opened.

From 1905 the University of Otago medical school, led by Dr F.C. Batchelor, lobbied for medical students to use St Helens for their obstetrical training. This was resisted by Seddon as priority was to be given to training midwives and he did not believe married women should be attended by medical students. A hospital known as the Batchelor Hospital was opened to train medical students.

By 1919 there were insufficient cases for the medical students at the Batchelor Hospital. In 1918 the Health Department agreed to allow women medical students to attend births at St Helens but permission was subsequently granted for male students if patient consent was obtained.

=== Auckland ===
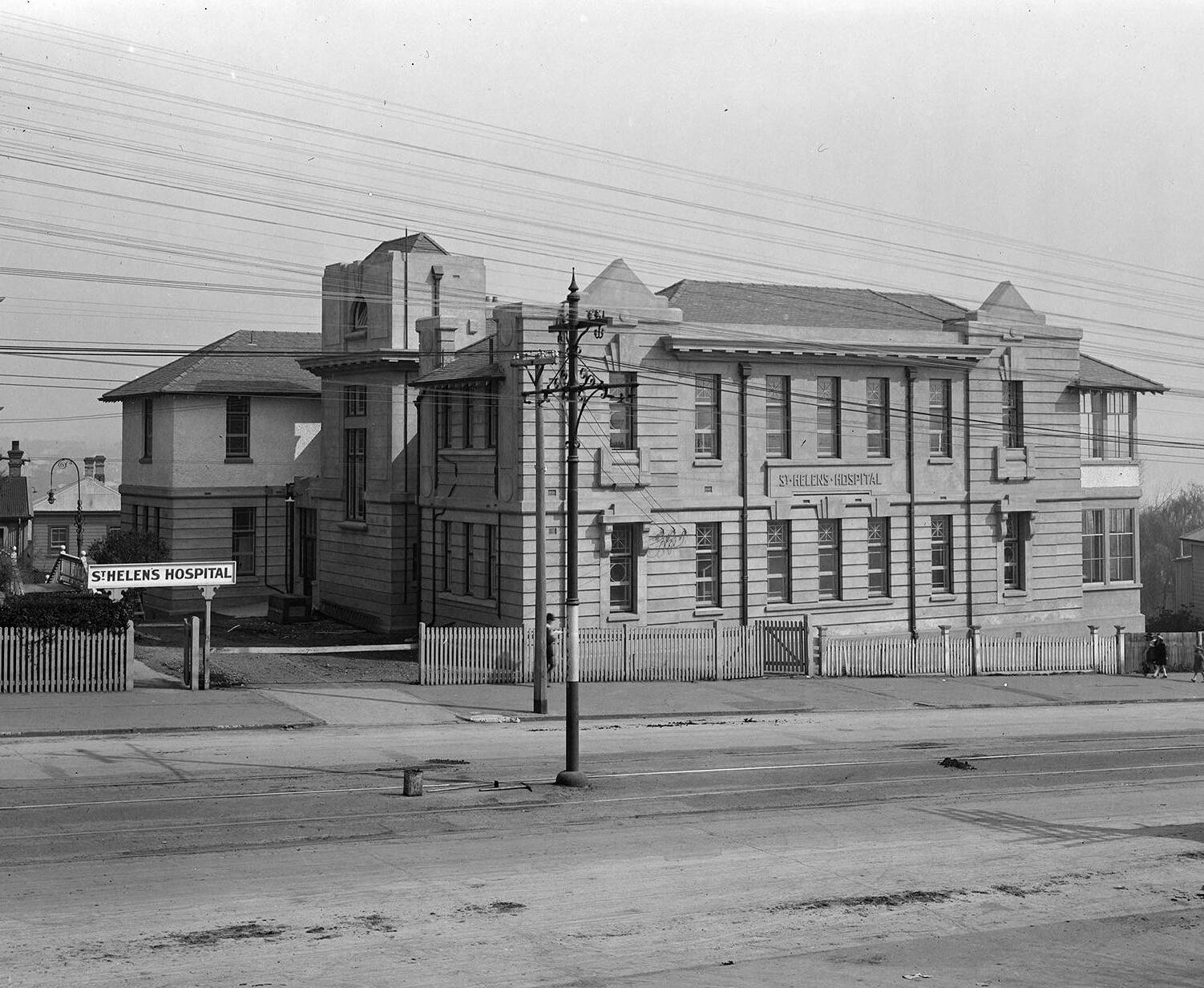
St Helens Hospital in Pitt Street, Auckland, pictured in 1922

The first St Helens Hospital in Auckland was opened on 14 January 1906 in Pitt Street in a house formerly owned by the family of Dr Arthur Guyon Purchas. It was to be officially opened by Richard Seddon but he died en route from Sydney to Auckland in June 1906. A lamp post was erected outside the hospital in 1906 to commemorate him. In 1922 a second St Helens, designed by the Public Works Department, was built next to the Pitt St building, the original building being used for the Nurses' Home. The location was noisy, being near the Pitt Street Fire Station. By 1938 it had 32 beds making it the largest maternity hospital in the country but still not big enough to meet the demands of the population. The building was finally demolished in 2002 to make way for an apartment building.

Plans for a new purpose built St Helens were published in 1959. The architects Newman, Smith and Associates won the design competition and in 1968 the hospital moved to the new four storey building in Linwood Avenue, Mt Albert. It opened on 15 October 1968 with 52 beds. When it was announced in 1989 that the hospital would close and services move to National Women's Hospital there was opposition and a 'Save St Helens' campaign. The hospital closed on 12 June 1990. In 1993 the building became part of the Auckland Institute of Studies, a private university.

=== Christchurch ===
The former Sydenham Hotel on the corner of Durham and Battersea streets in Sydenham, Christchurch was purchased for the hospital which opened in May 1907. The two storey building, with 16 beds, was not suitable and plans for a new building were shelved when war broke out in 1914. It was not until 1938 that a site for a new building opposite the public hospital was purchased but the outbreak of World War II again postponed building. The purpose-built hospital, between Colombo and Durham Streets, was designed by Robert Patterson, the Government Architect. It opened on 21 June 1952. Midwives carried out district midwifery services outside the hospital. In 1968 St Helens merged with Christchurch Women's Hospital.

=== Gisborne ===
In Gisborne the Townley Maternity Home, which was established in 1909, was converted by the government into Townley St Helens Hospital and opened in November 1915. It closed in 1935 after the establishment of a maternity annex at Cook Hospital.

=== Invercargill ===
In February 1917 the government announced its intention to purchase and refurbish a property in Nelson St, Georgetown, Invercargill for a St Helens. The hospital, which was partially furnished by money from the people of Invercargill, was opened later that year and carried out some district work. It closed in 1952.

=== Wanganui ===
The Wanganui St Helens opened in 1921 in a building in Heads Road adjacent to the Wanganui Hospital. The building was owned by a prominent citizen Mr Hope Gibbons and had been previously used as a convalescent home for returned servicemen after World War 1; when it was no longer needed as a convalescent home he offered the building to the government rent-free. In 1933 the Hospital Board took over St Helens and it became known as the Jessie Hope Gibbons Hospital in honour of Hope Gibbons's wife. It closed in 1955 when the Wanganui Maternity Hospital opened. Dr Douglas Wilson was in charge of St Helens and Jessie Hope Gibbons Hospital from 1921 to 1948.

== Midwives and doctors ==
While the hospitals were set up to train midwives there was a long running debate about the training of medical students in obstetrics. Medical students were trained at the Dunedin St Helens from 1919 and at the Auckland, Wellington and Christchurch St Helens from 1921. The Gisborne and Wanganui hospitals refused to train medical students on the grounds that there were not enough patients to train midwives and doctors. In 1929 the Dunedin St Helens stopped training midwives in favour of medical students. Debate about the use of the hospitals for training of students and the effect on patient care continued into the 1930s with a 'Hands Off St Helens' campaign begun in 1930.

Many of the matrons and sub-matrons served in a number of different St Helens Hospital; one of these was Mary Bagley, sister of Amelia Bagley, who trained at Townley St Helens in 1921 and was matron of Christchurch (1924–1926), Wanganui (1926–1928) and Wellington (1928–1933).

A number of other notable midwives and doctors trained or worked at the St Helens Hospitals.

=== Midwives ===
- Amelia Bagley (Wellington)
- Jessie Bicknell (Dunedin)
- Mary Agnes Canty (Wellington)
- Flora Cameron (Auckland)
- Marie McNaughton Cameron (Christchurch, matron 1910–1915)
- Joan Donley (Auckland)
- Eunice Eichler (Christchurch)
- Vera Ellis-Crowther (Auckland)
- Kathleen Hall (Christchurch)
- Alice Holford (Dunedin)
- Helen Inglis (Wellington and Christchurch)
- Mabel Mangakāhia (Auckland)
- René Shadbolt (Auckland)

=== Doctors ===
- Leslie Averill (Christchurch)
- Agnes Bennett (Wellington)
- Sylvia Chapman (Wellington)
- Emily Siedeburg (Dunedin)
- Russell Tracy-Inglis (Auckland)
