= Lily Lind =

New Zealand nurse

Lily Lind (13 June 1882 – 21 November 1916) was a nurse from New Zealand who served in France in World War I.

== Life and career ==
Lind was born in Makarewa, Southland, New Zealand, on 13 June 1882 to Agnes and William Lind. She trained as a nurse at Wellington Hospital and passed her nursing registration exam in 1909. In 1913 she travelled with her friend Margaret Hitchcock to Ireland to study midwifery at Dublin's Rotunda Hospital. At the time World War I broke out, the two women were living and working in London as private nurses.

Hitchcock and Lind volunteered their services to the newly formed French Flag Nursing Corps (FFNC), At the end of October 1914 the pair were part of the first contingent of nurses that the FFNC sent to France. They were posted to the Hotel Dieu in Rouen, where they worked alongside French nuns to nurse French, Belgian, Algerian, Turkish, and German soldiers. In mid-December the pair were moved to Bordeaux, to work in a large military hospital there. Next, from the end of January to June 1915, they were posted to the small town of Bergues near the Belgian border. There they nursed victims of a typhoid epidemic. While there, the FFNC nurses were exposed to intensive artillery bombardments which destroyed nearby buildings, forcing them to live in cellars.

In July 1915, the pair were moved to Bourbourg and nursed on a hospital barge which ferried sick and wounded soldiers to hospitals via the canals connecting the Belgian city of Nieuport to Dunkirk and Bourbourg in Flanders. In October 1915, Hitchcock and Lind moved again, to a contagious diseases hospital in Steenvoorde.

At the end of January 1916, they relocated to Nice as Lind had fallen ill. Initially she thought she had bronchitis, however she was soon diagnosed with tuberculosis, which she had probably contracted while working on the hospital barge. In February Lind moved into a temporary hospital set up at Le Grande Hotel in Grasse. Hitchcock nursed her friend with gargles, inhalations and poultices. In October 1916, both Lind and Hitchcock resigned from the FFNC and left France to travel home to New Zealand on the hospital ship Maheno. However, Lind died on 21 November, shortly after the ship left Colombo, and she was buried at sea.

=== Recognition ===
Lind was awarded the Croix de Guerre for her wartime services to France.
