= Joan Donley =

New Zealand midwife

- Donley in 1998, after receiving an honorary masters degree from the Auckland Institute of Technology
- Born: 16 March 1916; Regina, Saskatchewan, Canada
- Died: 4 December 2005 (aged 89); Auckland, New Zealand
- Occupations: Midwife, nurse

Joan Elsa Donley (née Carey; 16 March 1916 – 4 December 2005) was a Canadian-born New Zealand nurse and midwife. Donley was a key figure who shaped midwifery and the homebirth movement in New Zealand.

== Biography ==
Donley was born in Regina, Saskatchewan in 1916. She trained as a nurse at Saskatoon City Hospital as she could not afford to train as a doctor due to the Depression, and worked in a hospital in British Columbia.

In 1964, Donley emigrated to Auckland, New Zealand with her family, opening a fish market in Grey Lynn. After separating from her husband in 1969, she returned to healthcare, gaining a certificate in maternity from the National Women's Hospital, and completed a course in midwifery at St Helens in 1971. She then worked at Waitakere Hospital for two years.

When West Auckland midwife and homebirth proponent Vera Ellis-Crowther was about to retire in the 1974, she asked Donley and her colleague Carolyn Young to take over her practice, so that homebirth services could continue to be offered in Auckland. In the same year, Donley delivered her first homebirth baby, her granddaughter Mandy. Donley worked as a homebirth midwife for 21 years until 1995, attending approximately 750 births.

Donley was a strong proponent of homebirth, believing it was a feminist and political act, challenging to the white, male-controlled professions of obstetrics and gynaecology. Donley's philosophy involved empowering her clients into carrying out the birth comfortably and joyfully, using things as raspberry tea for relaxing muscles and molasses as iron supplements, as well as including warm baths, breathing exercises and massages to aid the birth, which is something the parents of over 730 babies she helped deliver attested to.

Donley was a outspoken domiciliary nurse, who formed both the Auckland Home Birth Association in 1978 and the New Zealand Domiciliary Midwives Society in 1981. The latter was accepted by the New Zealand Health Department as the bargaining body of for domiciliary midwives independently from other health professionals. In 1986, Donley published Save the Midwife, a history of New Zealand midwifery which greatly criticised the state of midwifery in the mid-1980s. The 1990 Nurses Amendment Act, which allowed for midwives to take primary responsibility for women during pregnancy, childbirth and the postnatal period, was authored by Helen Clark (then the Minister of Health), in part due to Donley's influence, as she regularly wrote to Clark about her concerns. This act became law in 1990, giving people in New Zealand the right to choose birthing at home or in a hospital.

Donley became an Officer of the Order of the British Empire in the 1990 New Year Honours, was awarded the New Zealand 1990 Commemoration Medal, a New Zealand Suffrage Centennial Medal in 1993 and an honorary masters degree in midwifery by the Auckland Institute of Technology in 1997. In 2001, the New Zealand College of Midwives established a research arm, which was named after Donley. After suffering from a stroke, Donley died in Auckland in 2005.

== Personal life ==
Donley married her husband Robert Fuhland Donley in Vancouver on 22 November 1941. Together, they had five children. The pair divorced in 1970.
