= Hester Maclean =

Australian/NZ nurse, editor and writer

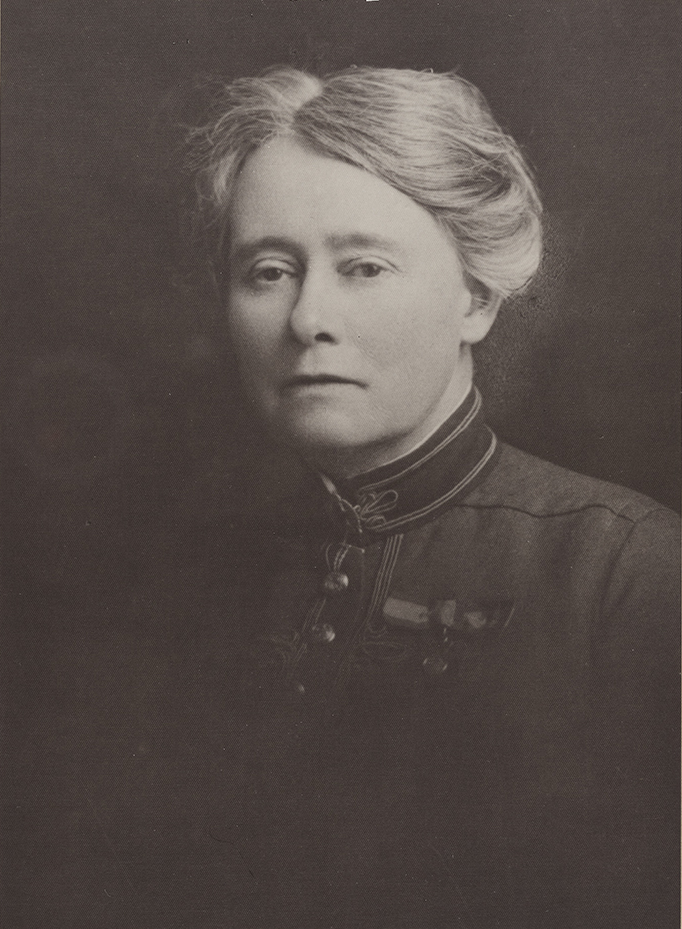
- Portrait of Hester MacLean
- Born: 25 February 1859; Sofala, Colony of New South Wales
- Died: 2 September 1932 (aged 73); Wellington, New Zealand
- Military career
- Allegiance: New Zealand
- Branch: New Zealand Military Forces
- Service years: 1911–1923
- Rank: Matron-in-Chief
- Commands: New Zealand Army Nursing Service (1915–23)
- Conflicts: First World War
- Awards: Royal Red Cross; Florence Nightingale Medal

Hester Maclean, RRC (25 February 1859 – 2 September 1932) was an Australian-born nurse, hospital matron, nursing administrator, editor and writer who spent most of her career in New Zealand. She served in the First World War as the founding Matron-in-Chief of the New Zealand Army Nursing Service, and was one of the first nurses to be awarded the Florence Nightingale Medal.

== Early life ==
Maclean was born in Sofala in the Colony of New South Wales on 25 February 1859. Her parents were Emily (née Strong) and Harold Maclean. She was educated at private schools and was inspired by her father's nurse to become a nurse herself. Maclean trained at Prince Alfred Hospital in Sydney, completing her certificate in 1893.

== Career ==
After completing her training, Maclean nursed in a number of hospitals in New South Wales and Victoria, including the Royal Women's Hospital in Melbourne and Kogarah Hospital in Sydney. In 1905 she travelled to England and trained in midwifery. On her return to Sydney, she successfully applied for the position of Assistant Inspector of Hospitals in Wellington, and moved to New Zealand in 1906 to replace Grace Neill, who was retiring. She held the position for 17 years under Thomas Valintine, the Inspector of Hospitals.

During her tenure, Maclean was responsible for establishing schemes for rural district nursing, native health nurses and school nurses. She also oversaw the extension of the St. Helen's hospitals for midwifery training. As Assistant Inspector, with Jessie Bicknell and Amelia Bagley, she played a major role in the implementation of the Midwives Act 1904 and setting midwifery standards.

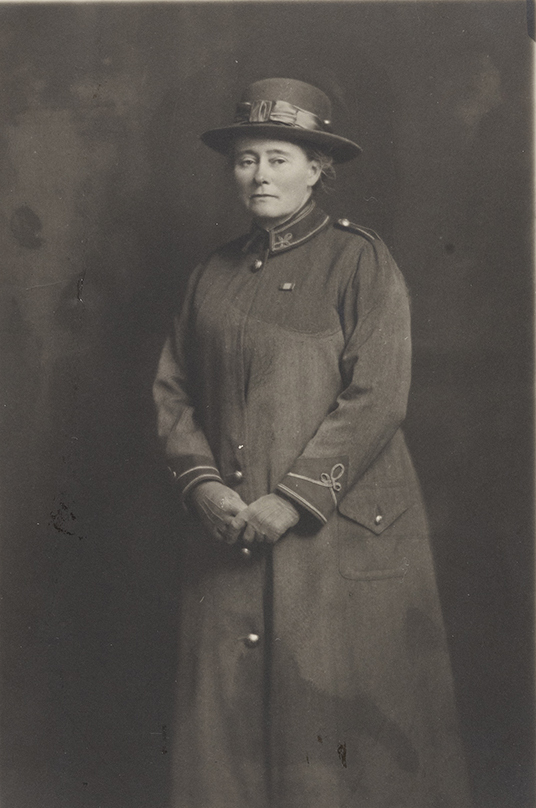
Hester MacLean

In 1907, Maclean proposed the establishment of a journal for nurses to exchange ideas and keep up to date with the latest international developments in nursing. She produced and funded the magazine, Kai tiaki the Journal of the Nurses of New Zealand, herself, with the first issue appearing in January 1908. Maclean continued to operate the journal until her retirement in 1923; she then sold it to the Registered Nurses Association, but retained the position of editor until her death.

After some encouragement during her travels around the country on inspections, the four provincial nursing associations amalgamated in 1909 into the New Zealand Trained Nurses Association. Maclean was elected the first national president and remained active in the organisation for the remainder of her life.

Maclean also established the New Zealand Army Nursing Service (NZANS) and led the first large contingent of New Zealand nurses overseas in the First World War, embarking with 50 nurses on the Rotorua in April 1915. Among other tasks, Maclean designed the NZANS's uniform.

In 1923, Maclean retired from the Department of Health and wrote her autobiography, Nursing in New Zealand, which was published in 1932. Maclean died in Wellington on 2 September 1932. She was buried in Karori Cemetery, after a full military funeral.

== Awards ==
In 1917 Maclean was awarded the Royal Red Cross, first class. In June 1920 The International Red Cross, Geneva awarded her the Florence Nightingale Medal.

== Artist ==
MacLean was also a keen amateur watercolourist. She exhibited at the New Zealand Academy of Fine Arts. Two of her works are in the collection of the Alexander Turnbull Library, Wellington. After her death a number of her watercolour sketches were sold to benefit the Registered Nurses' Association.
