= Jessie Bicknell =

New Zealand nurse, and a health administrator (1871–1956)

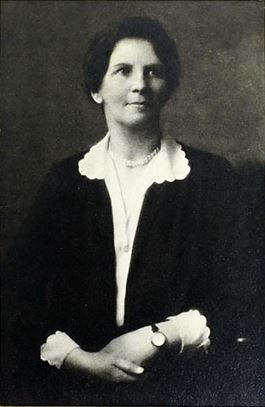
- Portrait of Jessie Bicknell, First Director Division of Nursing
- Born: 27 March 1871; Oamaru, North Otago, New Zealand
- Died: 13 October 1956 (aged 85); Remuera, Auckland, New Zealand
- Occupations: Matron, Director of the Division of Nursing for the Department of Health

Jessie Bicknell ARRC (27 March 1871–13 October 1956) was a New Zealand civilian and military nurse, and a health administrator. She served in World War I and was made an Associate of the Royal Red Cross for her service.

== Early life ==
Bicknell was born in Oamaru, North Otago, New Zealand on 27 March 1871 to Elizabeth Armstrong and Frederick Bicknell, a postmaster. She was one of ten children.

She was educated in Oamaru and Melbourne and trained as a nurse at Nelson Hospital. In 1903 she was first in the country in the national nursing examinations.

After completing her training, Bicknell worked at Wairau Hospital in Blenheim, and at Waipukurau Hospital. She then trained as a midwife at St Helens Hospital, Dunedin, completing her certificate in 1906.

== Career ==
In May 1907, Bicknell was appointed Assistant Inspector of Hospitals. Working under Hester Maclean, and alongside Amelia Bagley, Bicknell travelled the country, including to remote rural areas. She was primarily involved with inspecting and advising private hospitals, nurses and midwives. It was a key period of development for the professions; in 1904 the Midwife Registration Act had been passed, and many midwives had registered although they had not received formal training. In 1906, a similar act had been passed for the licensing and inspection of private hospitals. Bicknell's advice and input is regarded as crucial to the improvements in midwifery and hospital standards at this time.

In 1909 the New Zealand Trained Nurses' Association was formed, and Bicknell became the honorary secretary; she held this position until 1923.

In 1915, Bicknell was made deputy matron of the New Zealand Army Nursing Service and in January the following year sailed on the hospital ship Maheno as matron. The ship was used to evacuate injured soldiers to England from the Battle of the Somme. In 1917 Bicknell was made an Associate of the Royal Red Cross for her wartime services.

In 1917 Bicknell returned to New Zealand and her role as a hospital inspector. In 1923, Hester Maclean retired and Bicknell became director of the Division of Nursing in the Department of Health, and matron in chief of the Army Nursing Service. As part of her preparation for her appointment she was sent to England to observe new developments and became even more committed to nurse education; on her return she attended the Registered Nurses' Association conference in Dunedin and advocated for university training for nurses. She also attended the International Council of Nurses (ICN) meetings in Copenhagen in 1923, and Montreal in 1929, and became a member of the ICN Education Committee. She helped establish postgraduate nursing courses, and also worked on a superannuation scheme for hospital nurses, and a review of legislation affecting nurses. When the Nurses and Midwives Board was established in 1925, Bicknell was a member and its registrar.

== Later life ==
Bicknell retired in March 1931 and lived in Remuera, Auckland. She died in Green Lane Hospital on 13 October 1956. She is buried at Purewa Cemetery.
