= Vera Ellis-Crowther =

New Zealand midwife

Vera Jane Ellis-Crowther
- Ellis-Crowther photographed for Broadsheet in 1967
- Born: Vera Jane Hodgson; 27 August 1897; Liverpool, England
- Died: 6 July 1983 (aged 85); Point Chevalier, Auckland
- Occupations: Midwife, nurse

Vera Jane Ellis-Crowther (née Hodgson; 27 August 1897 – 6 July 1983) was a Liverpool-born New Zealand nurse and midwife. An early advocate for the use of anaesthetic during childbirth, Ellis-Crowther operated the Waitemata Obstetric Hospital in Glen Eden, West Auckland from 1945 to 1954. Later in life, Ellis-Crowther became an advocate for home birthing, delivering over 1,000 home birth babies in New Zealand.

== Biography ==
Ellis-Crowther was born as Vera Jane Hodgson in Liverpool, England, on 27 August 1897. In 1924, Ellis-Crowther immigrated to New Zealand with her husband. Her husband had trained as a chemist, but when they arrived in New Zealand they worked on farms in Te Aroha, and later bought a 300-acre sharemilking farm at Maramarua. Her husband died in a truck accident in 1932, leading Ellis-Crowther to buy an orchard in Glen Eden, West Auckland. She retrained as a nurse and midwife at St Helens Hospital. While working at Huia Obstetric Hospital, Ellis-Crowther was inspired to move to Rawene, to work with a doctor who gave a talk on the use of Nembutal, an anaesthetic used in childbirth.

In 1938, Ellis-Crowther wrote an article in feminist magazine Woman To-day, arguing that the use of pain relief during childbirth was a human right. She believed that access to universal pain relief and maternity services were a class issue. Ellis-Crowther's views on anaesthetics were opposed by Grantly Dick-Read and other male doctors, who were advocating for anaesthesia-free natural childbirth.

Ellis-Crowther opened the Waitemata Obstetric Hospital on her land at Glen Eden in 1945. The hospital building was not ready at the time of opening, so Ellis-Crowther operated out of disused railway carriages. She sold the hospital in 1954, and after living in England for a period, returned to Auckland to work as a midwife.

Later in life, Ellis-Crowther became a convert to the home birth movement. In the 1970s, she was the only midwive who offered home-birth services. When she began to retire in the 1970s, Ellis-Crowther convinced midwives Joan Donley and Carolyn Young to leave hospitals and take over from her, to continue providing home birth services. When Ellis-Crowther retired as a midwife in 1974, at age 79, she had delivered over 1,000 home birth babies. Ellis-Crowther died on 6 July 1983 in Auckland.

== Personal life ==
Ellis-Crowther married Harry Linton Crowther in England in 1923. Their only daughter Joan was born on 2 May 1929 at Te Aroha. She married her second husband, David Ellis, in December 1941. She joined the Communist Party of New Zealand in the 1920s.

== Bibliography ==
- Bryder, Linda (2014). The Rise and Fall of National Women's Hospital: A History. Auckland University Press. ISBN 9781869408091.
- Reidy, Jade (2009). "Looking After Ourselves". In Macdonald, Finlay; Kerr, Ruth (eds.). West: The History of Waitakere. Random House. pp. 157–178. ISBN 9781869790080.
