= Amelia Bagley =

Midwife and nursing administrator

Amelia Bagley (2 October 1870 – 30 January 1956) was a New Zealand hospital matron, midwife and nursing administrator. She was born in Dunedin, New Zealand on 2 October 1870.

== Career ==
Bagley trained in Dunedin from 1892 to 1895, first working as a ward sister at Auckland Hospital and then as matron of Masterton Hospital from 1903 to 1905. In 1905, she became a registered midwife, one of the first trainees at St Helens Hospital in Wellington. She then spent two years private nursing.

From 1908 to 1911, she was Assistant Inspector of Private Hospitals and Midwives in the Department of Hospitals and Charitable Aid inspecting small maternity hospitals and the practices of traditional midwives.

Bagley, with Hester Maclean and Jessie Bicknell, had a major role in supervising the implementation of the Midwives Act 1904 and setting midwifery standards. In 1911 the Department of Health launched a Native Health nursing scheme to address the health needs of Māori. Bagley was appointed as a superintendent nurse. In 1913, she went to Ahipara, Northland during typhoid and smallpox epidemics where she set up a temporary hospital at the local marae and provided nursing care and advice. She established five nursing stations around the country by the end of 1912, and was made Superintendent of Native Health Nurses in 1913.

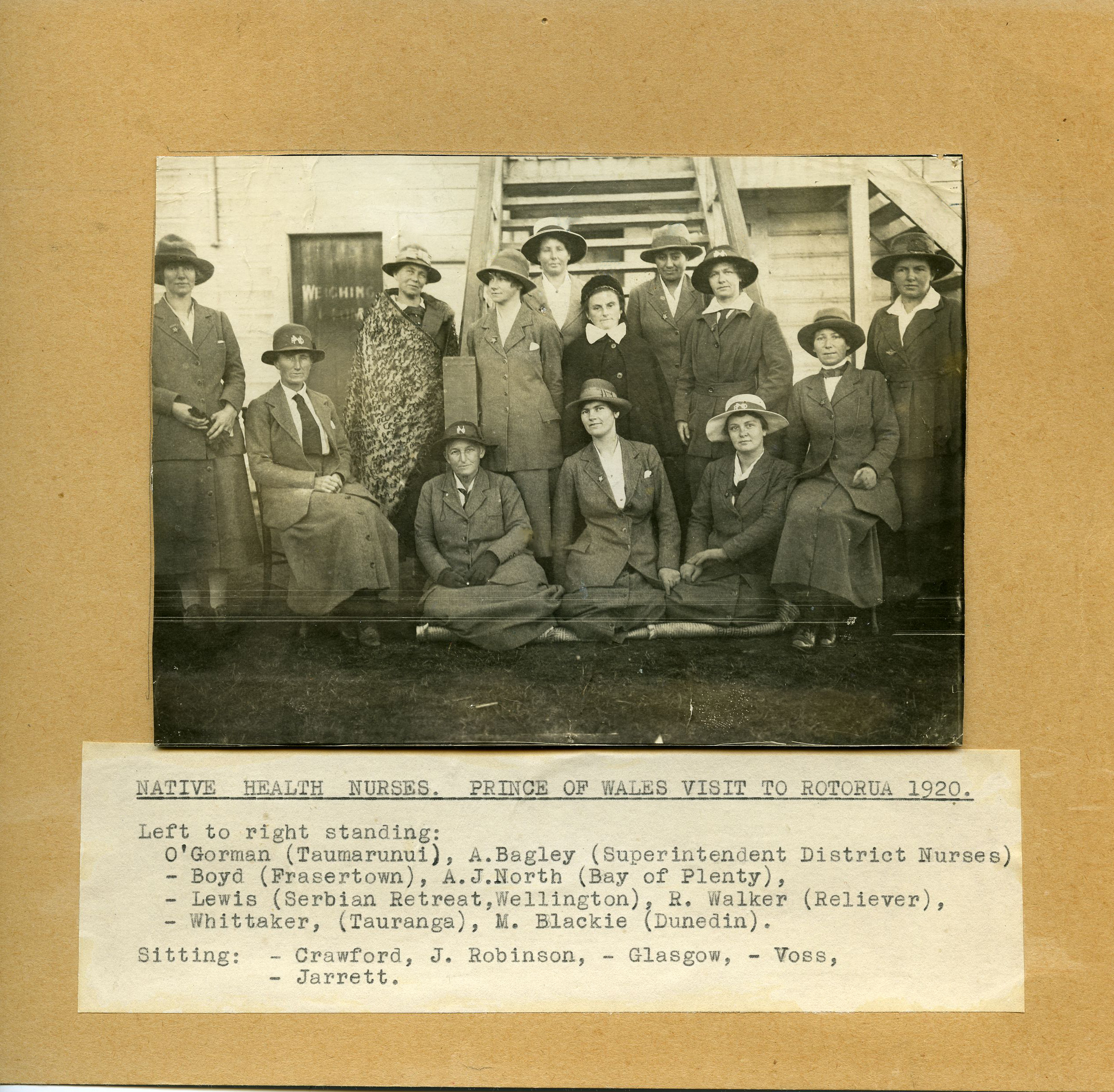
Native Health Nurses, Rotorua, 1920

Bagley wanted well qualified general and midwifery nurses for the Native Health nursing scheme as they would often be working in isolated areas where they would need to take responsibility and use their initiative. Additional attributes required by Bagley were physical stamina and personal qualities which enabled cooperation with the patients and community.

During World War 1 Bagley served firstly as Assistant Inspector of Hospitals/Civilian and then from 1917 as Matron/Military with the New Zealand Army Nursing Service on the hospital ships "Maheno" and "Marama".

After World War I, Bagley developed a Rural Nursing Service for the Auckland Public Health Service and a post-graduate qualification in rural nursing.

Bagley retired in 1930 and died on 30 January 1956 in Auckland, aged 85.
