= Kaitiaki Nursing New Zealand =

Journal of the New Zealand Nurses Organisation

Kaitiaki Nursing New Zealand is the official journal of the New Zealand Nurses Organisation. It publishes clinical and research articles on nursing in Aotearoa New Zealand.

== History ==
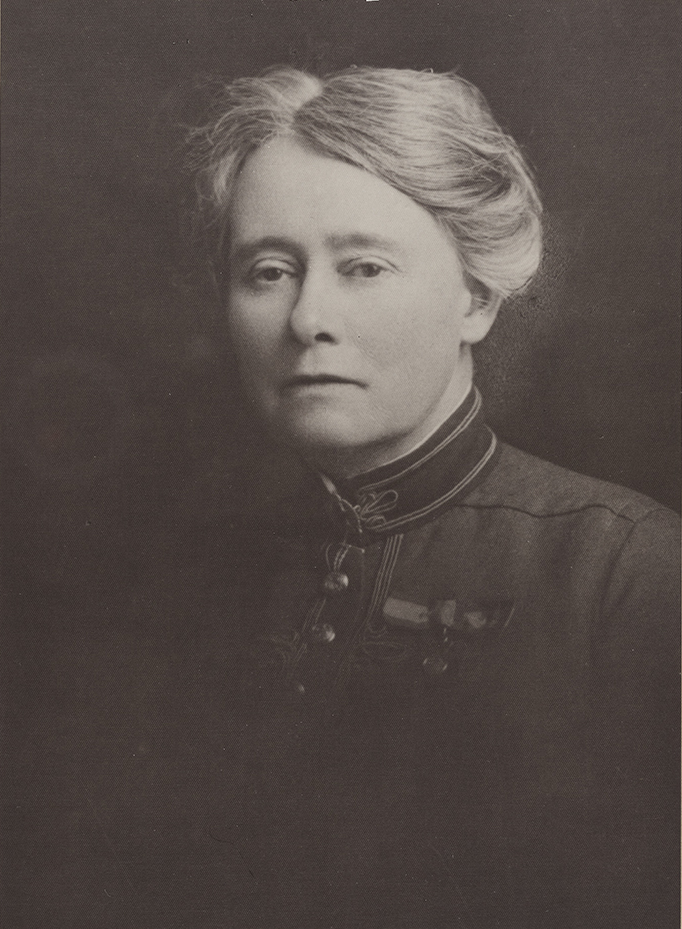
Hester Maclean

Kaitiaki Nursing New Zealand was founded in 1908 as, Kai Tiaki - the Journal of the Nurses of New Zealand, by Hester Maclean. The journal was first published quarterly and cost four shillings a year.

Kai Tiaki was initially chosen as a title by Maclean to reference the journal's country of origin, New Zealand, and the language, Te Reo Māori. However Kai Tiaki is an incorrect spelling of the Māori word Kaitiaki, which translates to guardian or carer.

In the first ever journal, Maclean wrote:

It will be we hope a bond of union, a common interest, a means of communication, a mutual help, and a road to improvement in their professional work and knowledge, to all the nurses of the Dominion, besides forming a link between not only the nurses of New Zealand and the other parts of Australasia, but also uniting them to the members of their profession throughout the world.

Apart from The White Ribbon, the Journal of the Women's Christian Temperance Union New Zealand, Kai Titaki was the only other journal of the time edited and created by women. It was registered as a magazine in 1912.

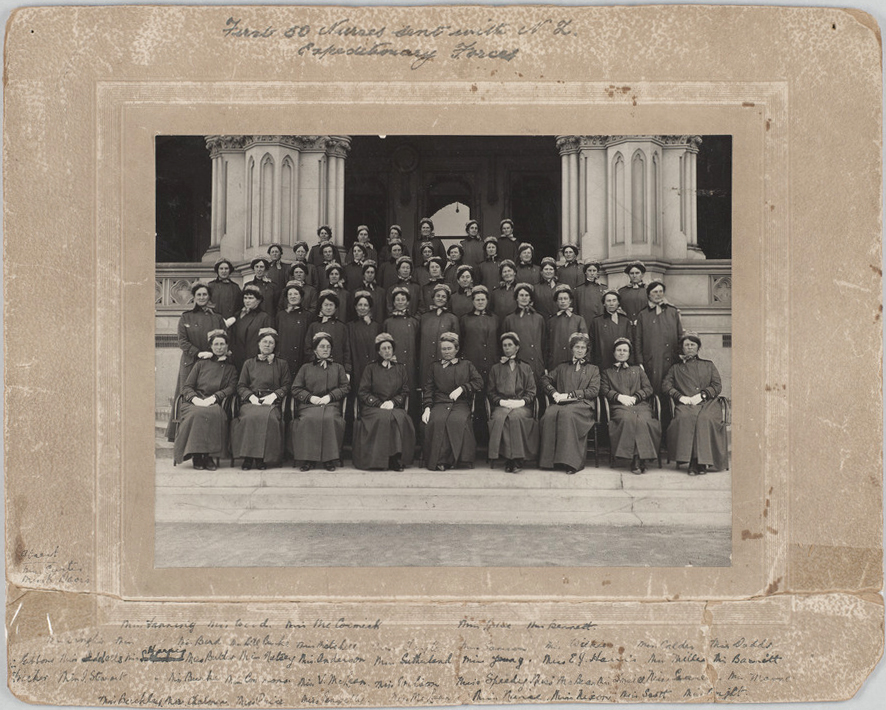
First fifty NZANS to serve in WWI, 8 April 1915

=== WWI ===
The journal was prolific during World War I, reporting of nurses involvement in active service. This included letters of communication, sharing experiences of war time nursing.

Kai Tiaki documented various moments in New Zealand's history, including when the first 50 nurses departed to the front on board the SS Rotorua. The April 1915 edition reported:

In another land, under skies which are not so bright and mayhap in surroundings which are not conducive to gladness, these women of New Zealand will doubtless have work to do which will make the heaviest call on their courage and steadfastness. They looked, as they doubtless are, a capable lot of women, who were offering for the noblest work that women can do, and offering with a knowledge that the work will be trying, but also with a determination to do. It was a contingent of which New Zealand has a right to be proud, and one that will assuredly acquit itself with honour.

=== Post-WWI ===
The journal reported other major historic health crisis's such as the 1918–1920 Influenza pandemic.

In 1923, the New Zealand Trained Nurses Association (NZTNA) purchased Kai Tiaki off Maclean who stayed on as an editor. The cost of the journal became six shillings a year and by 1930 it increased publication to bi monthly. The same year the journal changed its name from Kai Tiaki The Journal of the Nurses of New Zealand, which it held from 1908 to 1930. to New Zealand Nursing Journal (Kai Tiaki) maintaining it until 1994.

In 1932, founder Hester Maclean died, she had served as editor for twenty-four years.

During 1939–1947, the journal was reduced to a monthly publication due to wartime printing regulations. Then, from 1947 to 1959, it was increased to two publications a month then later, monthly. In 1942 and 1947 two issues were cancelled due to the journal's sole editor, Agnes Donner being on leave. In 1957, colour was first used on the cover and in 1958 its Golden Jubilee issue was published. The journal continued monthly publication until 1988 when December and January issues were merged, reducing publication to eleven times a year.

The first 30 years of publication from 1908 to 1929 were digitised by the National Library of New Zealand and are available online via Papers Past.

== Current journal and scope ==
From 1994 to present the journal has been named, Kai Tiaki Nursing New Zealand. In 2021, the journal launched online.

The current editorial team are Mary Longmore, Renee Kiriona and Kathy Stodart. While it is not an academic journal, articles undergo an expert peer review process to ensure quality and clinical accuracy.
