= Robert Crawford (psychiatrist) =

New Zealand psychiatrist (1941–2021)

Robert Crawford MNZM
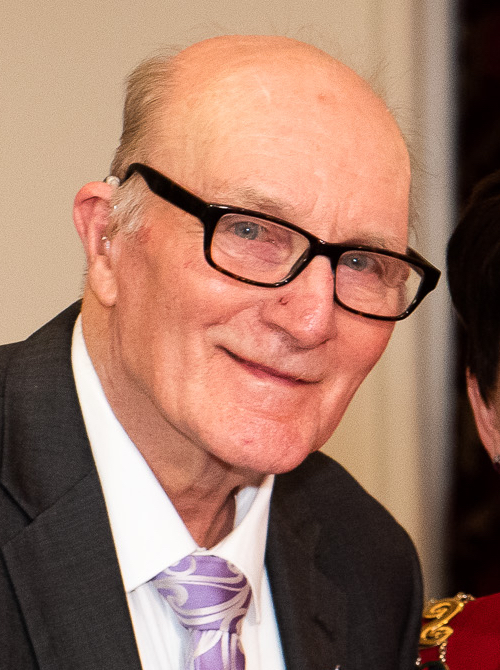
- Crawford in 2019
- Born: Robert John Mackay Crawford; 30 May 1941; Edinburgh, Scotland
- Died: 4 August 2021 (aged 80); Havelock North, New Zealand
- Citizenship: New Zealander (from 1980)
- Education: University of Edinburgh
- Occupation: Psychiatrist
- Spouse: Jan Herrington (m. 1967; died 2010)
- Children: 2

Robert John Mackay Crawford MNZM (30 May 1941 – 4 August 2021) was a British-born New Zealand doctor who specialised in the treatment of alcoholism and addictions. He was medical superintendent of Queen Mary Hospital in Hanmer Springs from 1976 to 1991 and an advocate for residential treatment for addictions.

== Early life ==
Crawford was born in Edinburgh, Scotland, on 30 May 1941. His parents were both doctors, trained at the University of Edinburgh. His mother was an anaesthetist at the Royal Infirmary of Edinburgh and medical officer at a tuberculosis sanatorium in the Lake District. His father served in the Royal Navy Reserve in Ceylon during World War II.

Crawford completed his medical degree at the University of Edinburgh in 1965. On 18 November 1967, he married Janet Clare Herrington, whom he had met at university, at the Church of St Giles, Stoke Poges, Buckinghamshire.

== Career ==
Crawford and his wife Jan, also a doctor, came to New Zealand on holiday in 1970 after working as medical officers in the Pacific. Crawford was a general practitioner in Fiji and Kiribati. They returned to Scotland where he trained in psychiatry at Edinburgh University. He practised at clinics in Edinburgh but became disillusioned with psychiatric practice in Scotland where he felt there was overuse of medication in treatment and a system which was uncaring. Having visited the Chatham Islands in 1970 he applied for and was offered a job as medical officer to the Chathams in 1972. The job fell through and Crawford was offered a job in Hanmer Springs instead.

Crawford arrived in Hanmer in 1972 working as special general practitioner to the Hanmer Springs Special Area and as part-time medical officer at Queen Mary. In 1976 he became medical superintendent. He became a naturalised New Zealander in 1980.

He resigned from the position in 1991 in protest at changes in the way the hospital was to be managed with overall hospital management vested in the former principal nurse.

Crawford remained a critic of the hospital's closure in 2003, blaming it on Rogernomics, and a focus on financial bottom lines which ignored the cost to society of untreated addictions and alcoholism. After the hospital's closure he continued to advocate for the hospital and its buildings. He and a group of Hanmer residents set up The Queen Mary Reserve Trust Incorporated in 2003 to retain the land in public ownership. In 2018 he joined former patients in a call for the hospital to reopen. By his own admission he was off-side with the government and some in the medical professions for opposing outpatient treatments and for advocating for effective residential treatment for alcoholism and drug addictions. He was concerned at the increase in drinking and drug taking in society and the liberalisation of drinking laws in 1999 and thought that liquor hours and points of sale should be reduced.

Crawford served on the treatment committee of the Alcoholic Liquor Advisory Programme (ALAC).

Crawford believed that to a great extent addictions could not be helped by medication and that patients needed to find ways of coping with their stresses through behavioural and psychological changes. He used ideas from social psychiatry and practised psychotherapy and psychodrama and recognised that the quality of the relationship and trust between doctor and patient is critical to successful therapy. He advocated for residential care as it removed patients from alcohol and drugs and relieved the pressure on addicts' families. He introduced the first Māori treatment programme, the Taha Māori programme in the 1990s. In 2019 a report into mental health acknowledged the success of the Taha Māori programme and called for it to be reinstated.

== Honours and awards ==
Crawford was appointed a Member of the New Zealand Order of Merit, for services to mental health and addiction services, in the 2019 Queen's Birthday Honours. He was awarded Distinguished Membership of the New Zealand Association of Psychotherapists.

== Personal life ==
Crawford's wife Jan practised medicine in the Culverden and Waiau areas. They had two sons.

Crawford died in Havelock North on 4 August 2021. He had been predeceased by his wife, Jan Crawford, in 2010.
