= Maureen Morris =

New Zealand nurse

Maureen Shirley Morris MNZM
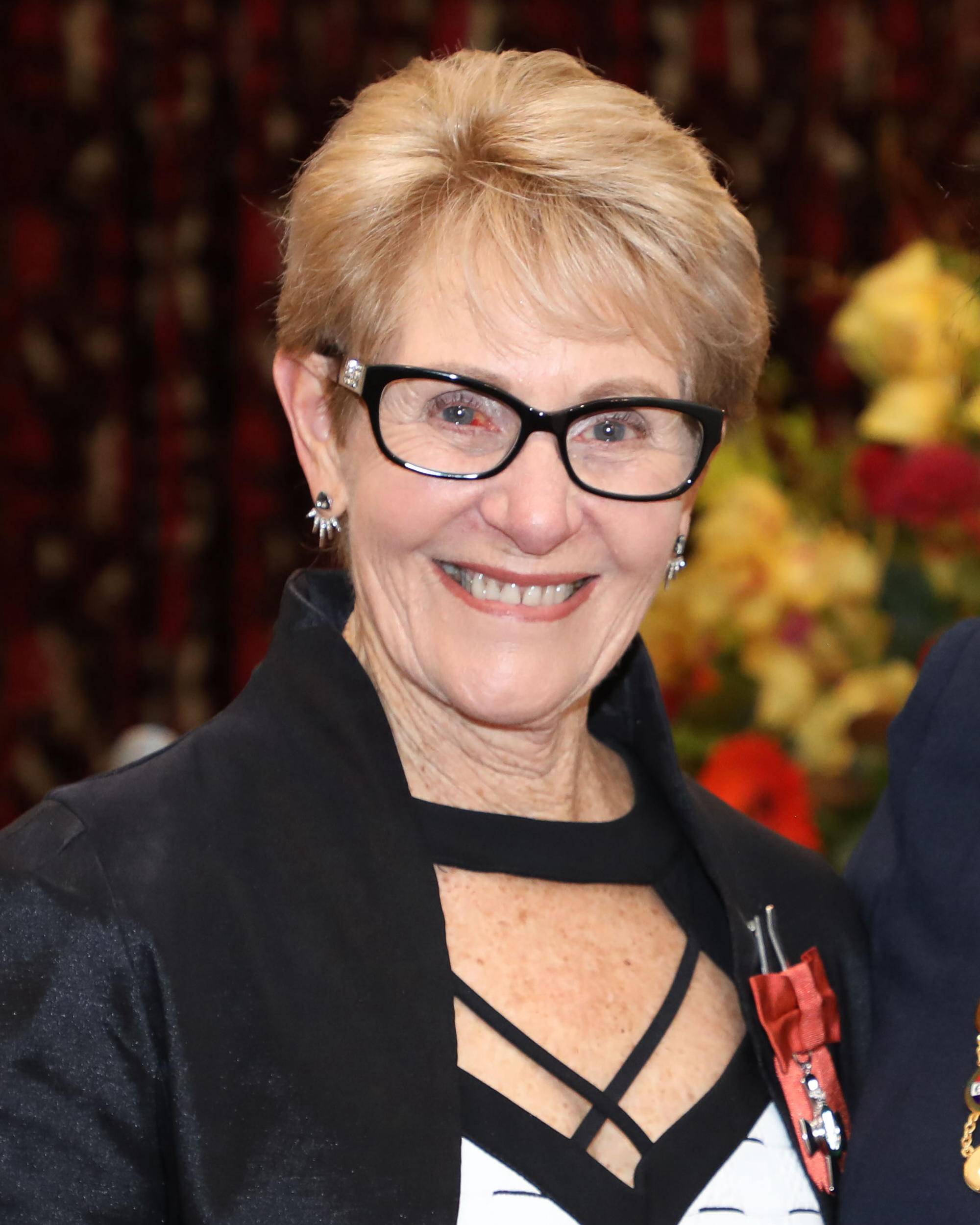
- Morris in 2024
- Awards: Member of the New Zealand Order of Merit

Maureen Shirley Morris MNZM is a New Zealand nurse, and is a Fellow of the College of Nurses Aotearoa New Zealand. In 2024 Morris was appointed a Member of the New Zealand Order of Merit for services to nursing.

== Career ==
Morris began working as a nurse in 1966, and worked at Whangārei and Auckland hospitals. She specialised in oncology nursing, and from 2002 until 2007 she was the charge nurse manager at the oncology ward in Auckland City Hospital. During her tenure, the entire ward had to be moved to another hospital. Morris was the colorectal cancer nurse specialist for Northland. In 2014 Morris became a founding member of the Jim Carney Cancer Treatment Centre in Whangārei, which enabled local treatment so cancer patients could avoid travel to Auckland. Morris helped to create the Cancer Nurses Section of the New Zealand Nurses Organisation, and to establish the Cancer Nurses Knowledge and Skills Framework.

Morris has held voluntary roles in a number of organisations, including Northland Hospice Society, the Breast Cancer Support Service, the National Association for Loss and Grief, and Blind Low Vision New Zealand, and as Chair of the Child Cancer Foundation.

Morris retired in June 2023, although due to staff shortages she continued working until the end of the year.

== Honours and awards ==
In 2013 Morris was awarded the Cancer Nursing Innovation and Excellence Award by the New Zealand Nurses Organisation. She was elected a Fellow of the New Zealand College of Nurses Aotearoa.

In the 2024 King's Birthday Honours Morris was appointed a Member of the New Zealand Order of Merit for services to nursing.
