= Margaret Hitchcock =

New Zealand nurse

Margaret (Daisy) Hitchcock MBE (1883 - 13 March 1967) was a nurse from New Zealand who served in France in World War I.

== Life and career ==
Hitchcock was born in 1883 to Maria and Henry Hitchcock of Wellington. Hitchcock trained as a nurse in Wellington, passing her nursing registration exam in 1909.

In 1910 Hitchcock travelled with her friend Lily Lind to Ireland to study midwifery at Dublin’s Rotunda Hospital. At the time World War I broke out, the two women were living and working in London as private nurses.

Hitchcock and Lind volunteered their services to the newly formed French Flag Nursing Corps (FFNC), At the end of October 1914 the pair were part of the first contingent of nine nurses that the FFNC sent to France. They were posted to the Hotel Dieu in Rouen, where they worked alongside French nuns to nurse French, Belgian, Algerian, Turkish, and German soldiers. In mid-December the pair were moved to Bordeaux, to work in a large military hospital there. Next, from the end of January to June 1915, they were posted to the small town of Bergues near the Belgian border. There they nursed victims of a typhoid epidemic. While there, the FFNC nurses were exposed to intensive artillery bombardments which destroyed nearby buildings, forcing them to live in cellars.

In July 1915, the pair were moved to Bourbourg and nursed on a hospital barge which ferried sick and wounded soldiers to hospitals via the canals connecting the Belgian city of Nieuport to Dunkirk and Bourbourg in Flanders. In October 1915, Hitchcock and Lind moved again, to a contagious diseases hospital in Steenvoorde.

At the end of January 1916, they relocated to Nice as Lind had fallen ill. Initially she thought she had bronchitis, however she was soon diagnosed with tuberculosis, which she had probably contracted while working on the hospital barge. In February Lind moved into a temporary hospital set up at Le Grande Hotel in Grasse. Hitchcock nursed her friend with gargles, inhalations and poultices. In October 1916, both Lind and Hitchcock resigned from the FFNC and left France to travel home to New Zealand on the hospital ship Maheno. However, Lind died on 21 November, shortly after the ship left Colombo, and she was buried at sea.

Hitchcock arrived back in Wellington on 23 December 1916. In May 1917, she enlisted in the New Zealand Army Nursing Service; she spent six months working at Trentham military camp in Wellington then left in October 1917 to return to England. From December 1917 until May 1919, Hitchcock was posted to the New Zealand Expeditionary Force’s general hospitals at Brockenhurst and Codford.

On her return to New Zealand, Hitchcock spent some time nursing shell-shocked men at Queen Mary Hospital at Hanmer Springs. She then re-trained as an infant nurse with the Plunket Society and worked as a matron at Karitane Hospitals in Auckland, Dunedin and Wellington.

During her time in Europe, Hitchcock received several items of trench art and rehabilitative art from soldiers she nursed, and some of these were later donated to Museum of New Zealand Te Papa Tongarewa.

During World War II Hitchcock worked in nurse management with the Royal New Zealand Air Force in Rongotai, Wellington. In 1946 she was awarded an MBE for her military nursing service. Hitchcock died in Palmerston North on 13 March 1967.
