= New Zealand Nurses Organisation =

New Zealand professional body and trade union

NZNO
- New Zealand Nurses Organisation
- Tōpūtanga Tapuhi Kaitiaki o Aotearoa
- Founded: 1905
- Headquarters: Wellington
- Location: New Zealand
- Members: 62,000
- Key people: Paul Goulter (Chief Executive); Anne Daniels (President); Kerri Nuku (Kaiwhakahaere)
- Affiliations: NZCTU, ICN
- Website: www.nzno.org.nz

The New Zealand Nurses Organisation (NZNO), Tōpūtanga Tapuhi Kaitiaki o Aotearoa, is New Zealand's largest trade union and professional organisation that represents the nursing profession, midwives, hauora and caregivers.

It is one of the oldest organisations of this type in the world, tracing its lineage back to the Wellington Private Nurses Association formed in 1905.

NZNO produces an online journal, Kaitiaki Nursing New Zealand.

The NZNO is affiliated with the New Zealand Council of Trade Unions, and the International Council of Nurses. NZNO also works closely with a number of other international organisations including the World Health Organization (WHO), the International Labour Organization (ILO), UNICEF and UNESCO.

== Honorary members ==
Nurse and nurse educator Louise Rummel was made an honorary member of NZNO in 2004.

The NZNO gives out a number of awards. Notable recipients include Maureen Morris, who was awarded the Cancer Nursing Innovation and Excellence Award in 2013.

== See also ==
- Nursing in New Zealand
