= Helen Clyde Inglis =

Helen Clyde Inglis (15 November 1867 – 12 February 1945) was a New Zealand teacher, hospital matron and nursing activist. She was born in Christchurch, North Canterbury, New Zealand on 15 November 1867. Her father, the merchant John Inglis, was a member of the Canterbury Provincial Council.

== Career ==
Before becoming a nurse Inglis was a teacher. In 1900 she began her nursing training at the Edinburgh Royal Infirmary, followed by midwifery training at the Glasgow Maternity Hospital. On her return to New Zealand in 1905 she worked at Timaru Hospital, then as Assistant Matron of Wellington St Helens. She was matron of Christchurch St Helens from 1907 to 1910 and matron of Wellington St Helens from 1914 to 1923. She was also Inspector of Midwives for the Health Department. On her retirement in 1923 she became Honorary General Secretary of the Registered Nurses' Association for nine years.

She died in Wellington in 1945.
