= Queen Mary Hospital (Hanmer Springs) =

Former hospital in Hanmer Springs, New Zealand

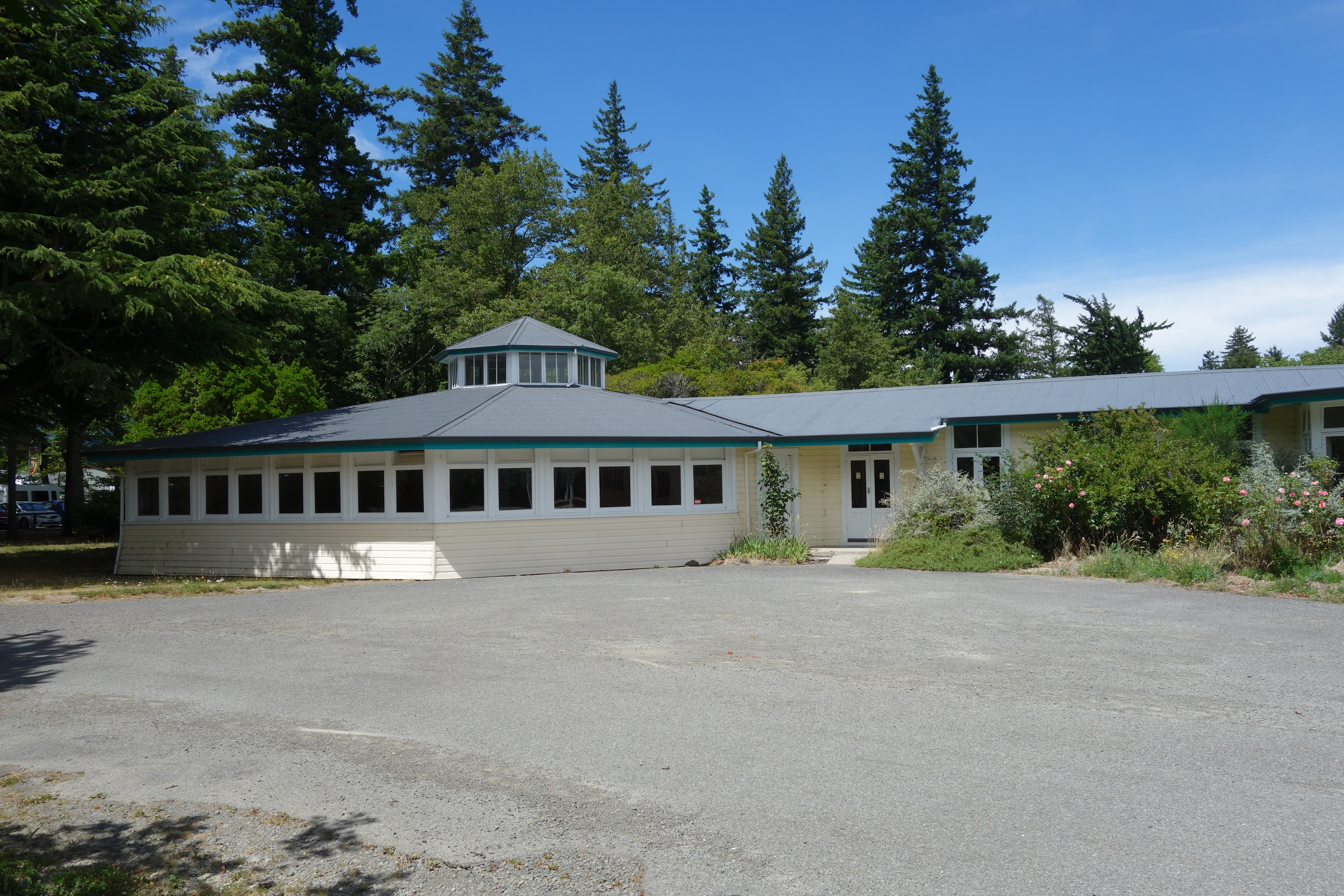
- Soldiers' Block, 2015

Geography
- Location: Hanmer Springs, New Zealand
- Coordinates: 42°31′25″S 172°49′40″E

Organisation
- Care system: Public
- Type: Psychiatric hospital

History
- Constructed: 1915
- Opened: 1916
- Closed: 2003

Links
- Lists: Hospitals in New Zealand

Queen Mary Hospital, in Hanmer Springs, New Zealand is a former residential alcohol and drug treatment hospital. It opened in 1916 to treat returned servicemen from World War I, on the site of a sanatorium built in 1879. From the 1920s to 1960s it treated mental health conditions generally but in the 1970s it became the national specialist addiction and alcohol treatment centre. The hospital closed in November 2003. The Queen Mary Hospital (Former) and Hanmer Springs Thermal Reserve Historic Area was designated as a historic site by Heritage New Zealand in 2004. Within that area three buildings, the Soldiers' Block, Nurses' Home and Chisholm Block, were given Category I protection by Heritage New Zealand in 2005.

== History ==
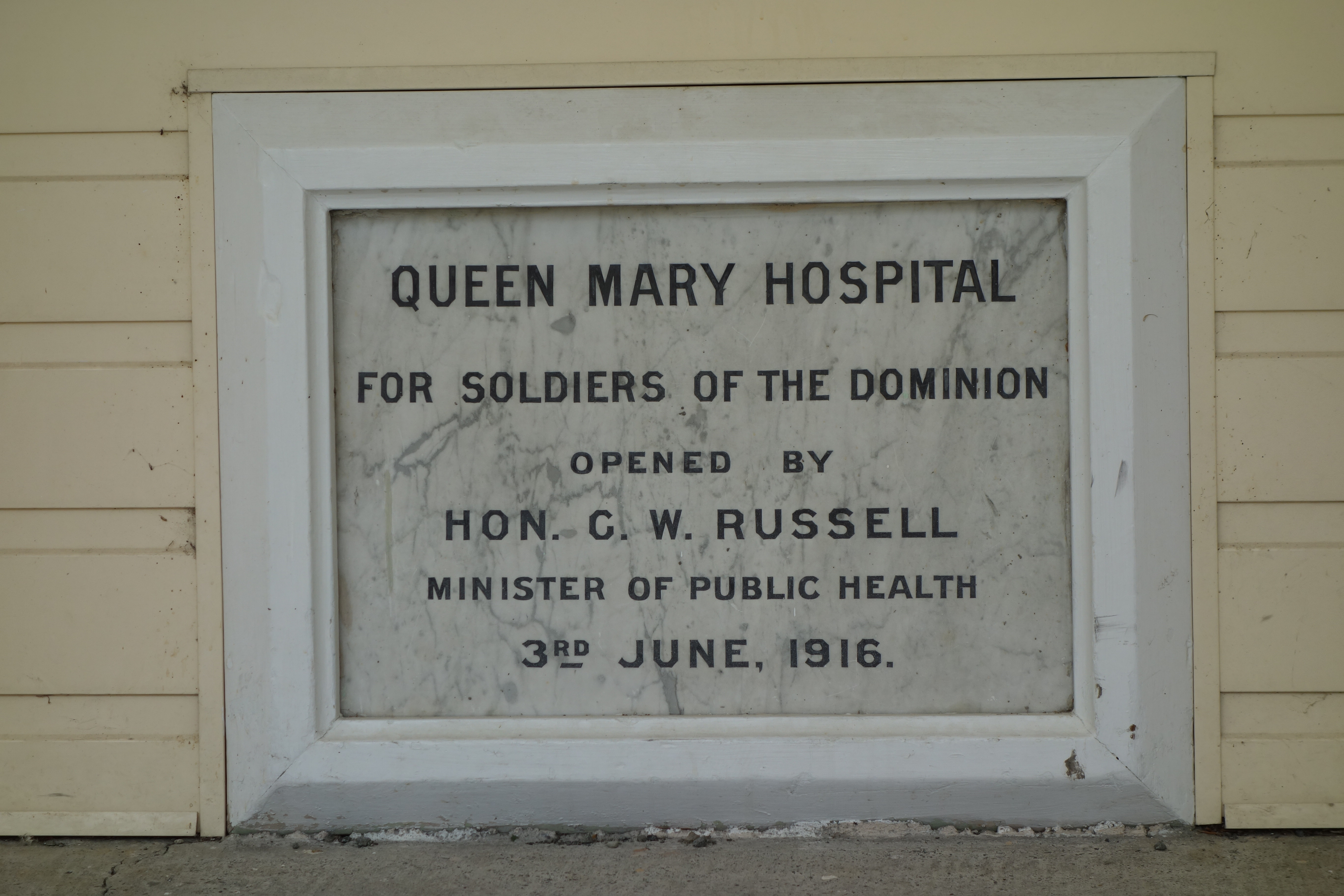
Plaque commemorating 1916 opening

=== Foundation ===
In 1879 the government opened a sanatorium at Hanmer Springs. European settlers had been using the thermal pools since 1859 although Māori had long used them. In 1889 a reserve was created around the pools. The sanatorium building was destroyed by fire in 1914. Duncan Rutherford, a local sheep farmer, offered the use of The Lodge Hotel for convalescent soldiers while a new building was constructed. In 1915 plans were drawn up for a hospital to accommodate 200 servicemen returning from World War I who needed rehabilitation for mental and nervous conditions, particularly shell-shock. The first hospital building was the Soldiers' Block which was opened on 3 June 1916 by G.W. Russell, the Minister of Public Health and Hospitals. The full name of the hospital was Queen Mary Hospital for Sick and Wounded Soldiers.

=== 1922 to the 1980s ===
The hospital was run by the military until 1922 when it was passed to the Department of Health. The name of the hospital became Queen Mary Hospital. A women's ward (Chisholm Block) opened in 1926 and another men's ward (Rutherford Block) in the 1940s.

By the late 1960s most patients had alcoholism or addictions. In the early 1970s Queen Mary became the national hospital for the treatment of addictions, taking patients from all over the country who were referred by their general practitioner. It was administered by the North Canterbury Hospital Board but funded by the Department of Health. Specialist treatment for addictions was lacking in many other psychiatric hospitals and Queen Mary was the only hospital offering therapies for addicts and alcoholics.

=== 1980s to 2003 ===
Around 1989 the Canterbury Area Health Board proposed closing Queen Mary but there was great public opposition, including demonstrations. In 1990 the funding model for the hospital changed. Up to that date the hospital was funded from the Department of Health to the local health board but with the introduction of "cross boundary charging" other health boards opted to treat patients in the community rather than in residential facilities. Changes in the way the hospital was managed led to the resignation of the medical superintendent Dr Robert Crawford in 1991. The position of medical superintendent was disestablished and the former principal nurse became the hospital's manager. The Health Board draft operating plan also proposed reducing the number of beds from 117 to 55 and shortening the courses of treatment.

The decision to close Queen Mary was made in 1996 but in 1997 businessmen Rob Fenwick and John Beattie bought Queen Mary from the Crown Health Enterprise Healthlink South. They were the major shareholders of their company Hanmer Institute Limited with other shareholders being current and former staff. Fenwick's motivation to purchase the hospital was a result of having had a close family member receive treatment there. Fenwick and Beattie planned to bring in private fee-paying patients from New Zealand and overseas to make the hospital financially viable. From 1999 to 2000 they also set up regional outpatient clinics in Christchurch, Wellington, Tauranga, Hamilton and Auckland which would refer patients to the hospital. They also set up another company, Instep, to provide treatment programmes for corporate clients. The hospital sustained financial losses but continued to receive government funding via the Ministry of Health. In 2002 the youth programme closed. A plan produced in 2003 proposed reducing beds, staff numbers and taking more private patients to enable the residential programme to continue. In April 2003 the assets were transferred to a new charitable company Hanmer Clinics Limited. However the Ministry of Health withdrew its funding, the company went into liquidation and the hospital closed in November 2003.

In Robert Crawford's view the demise of the hospital was attributed to the regionalisation of the health services which reduced the number of public patients being referred to Queen Mary, and Rogernomics with its focus on finances and reliance on managerial approaches to health. He also believed that opposition to the spiritual dimensions of Queen Mary's treatment programmes was another factor in the hospital's demise.

=== 2003 onwards ===
In late 2003 the Canterbury District Health Board proposed selling the hospital land which was now surplus to requirements. Opposition to this was based on the argument that the land should revert to being a public reserve. A group of Hanmer residents including Robert Crawford set up The Queen Mary Reserve Trust Incorporated to retain the land in public ownership. The Historic Places Trust (now Heritage New Zealand) made the area and buildings a historic reserve in 2004 and three of the buildings Category I sites in 2005. As it was surplus crown land it was offered to Ngāi Tahu under the Ngāi Tahu Claims Settlement Act 1998. Ngāi Tahu relinquished their option to purchase the land and it passed to the Department of Conservation in 2008 and then to the Hurunui District Council in 2010.

In 2012 the Hurunui District Council attempted to lease the buildings, placing the search for tenants with Bayleys real estate company. No takers were found. A plan in 2018 to use two buildings for a day spa did not come to fruition due to lack of investors. The same year a group of former patients and Robert Crawford called for the hospital to re-open.

In 2023 the Hurunui District Council purchased the remainder of the site that was not included in the 2010 transfer of ownership. Several buildings with no heritage protection stood on this piece of land. Earlier in the year the Council announced that it would restore and earthquake strengthen the Soldiers' Block and use the building as a community space, a meeting house for local iwi Ngāti Kurī and an interactive museum telling the history of the hospital. Construction and restoration work began in 2024 on the Soldiers' Block and took 11 months and the Soldiers' Block reopened on Anzac Day. Work to turn the building into an interactive exhibit is ongoing with fundraising expected to be completed before 2028.

In October 2024 one of the other hospital buildings was destroyed in a suspicious fire.

== Treatment and therapies ==
From 1921 until the late 1960s men and women with mental health conditions such as depression, psychoses, anxiety disorders and addictions were treated. Queen Mary was never gazetted as a hospital for compulsory treatment under the Mental Health Act, making all admissions voluntary.

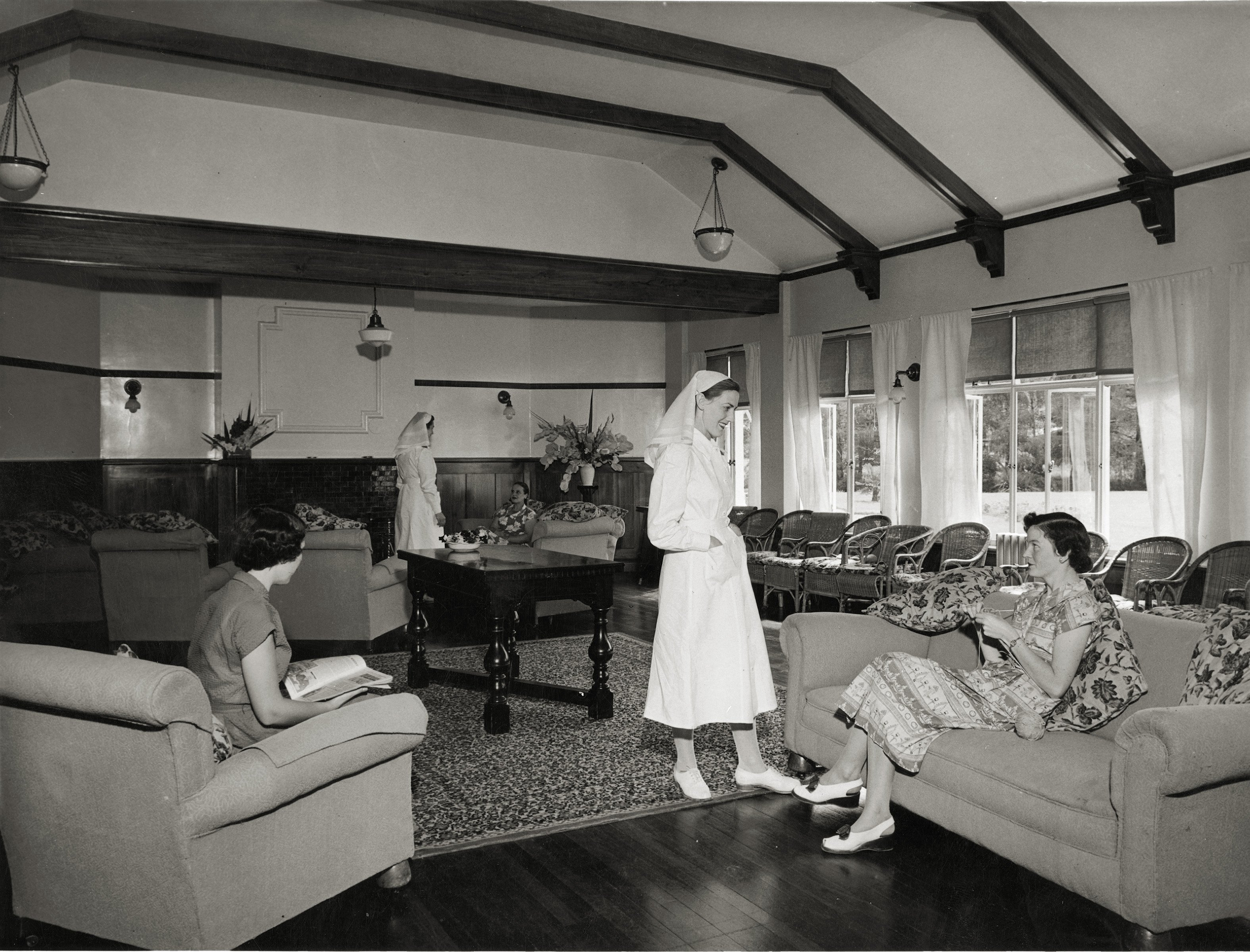
Chisholm Ward sitting room, 1950

By the late 1960s most patients had alcoholism or addictions resulting in the hospital solely treating these conditions from about 1971.

The matron in 1959 recorded that the hospital had "little institutional atmosphere", patients were encouraged to see the hospital as home and were encouraged to participate in "homely, daily tasks". Sports included tennis, table tennis, indoor and outdoor bowls, golf, billiards, gardening, walking and climbing trips and swimming. Films, cards and dancing were available and books for the library were supplied by the Country Library Service. There were occupational therapy and physiotherapy departments and meetings of Alcoholics Anonymous. A hospital farm ran until 1972.

Treatment was based on Alcoholics Anonymous lines, but later psychotherapies were adopted including group therapy and psychodrama. There were a variety of other programmes: an outdoor programme, an education programme, gardening, a family members' programme and a grief group. Another innovation was the Artist-in-Residence programme supported by the Queen Elizabeth Arts Council of New Zealand's Arts Access Programme.

The first programme tailored for Māori, the Taha Māori Treatment Programme, was initiated in the late 1970s. The concepts of whānau (family) and tipuna (ancestry) were strong elements underpinning the programme. Initially it was also attended by pākehā patients who were keen to learn about Māori culture and attracted by the whānau atmosphere. As the programme evolved it was decided that patients had to be referred to it, as was the case with other 'specialist' therapy groups; thus attendance was limited to Māori only to allow those patients to connect with their traditional roots.

Accounts from former patients attest to the effectiveness of the treatment programmes and the healing provided by the beauty and tranquility of the environment, both physical and spiritual.

== The buildings and gardens ==
The accommodation blocks at the hospital were all designed facing north with views of the mountains; they were built with plenty of windows and verandahs to maximise sunlight and fresh air for the promotion of healing. All of the blocks were single-storey; only the Rutherford Block was designed to take a second-storey but it was never built. As a result the wards had a homely and less institutional feel.

=== The Soldiers' Block ===
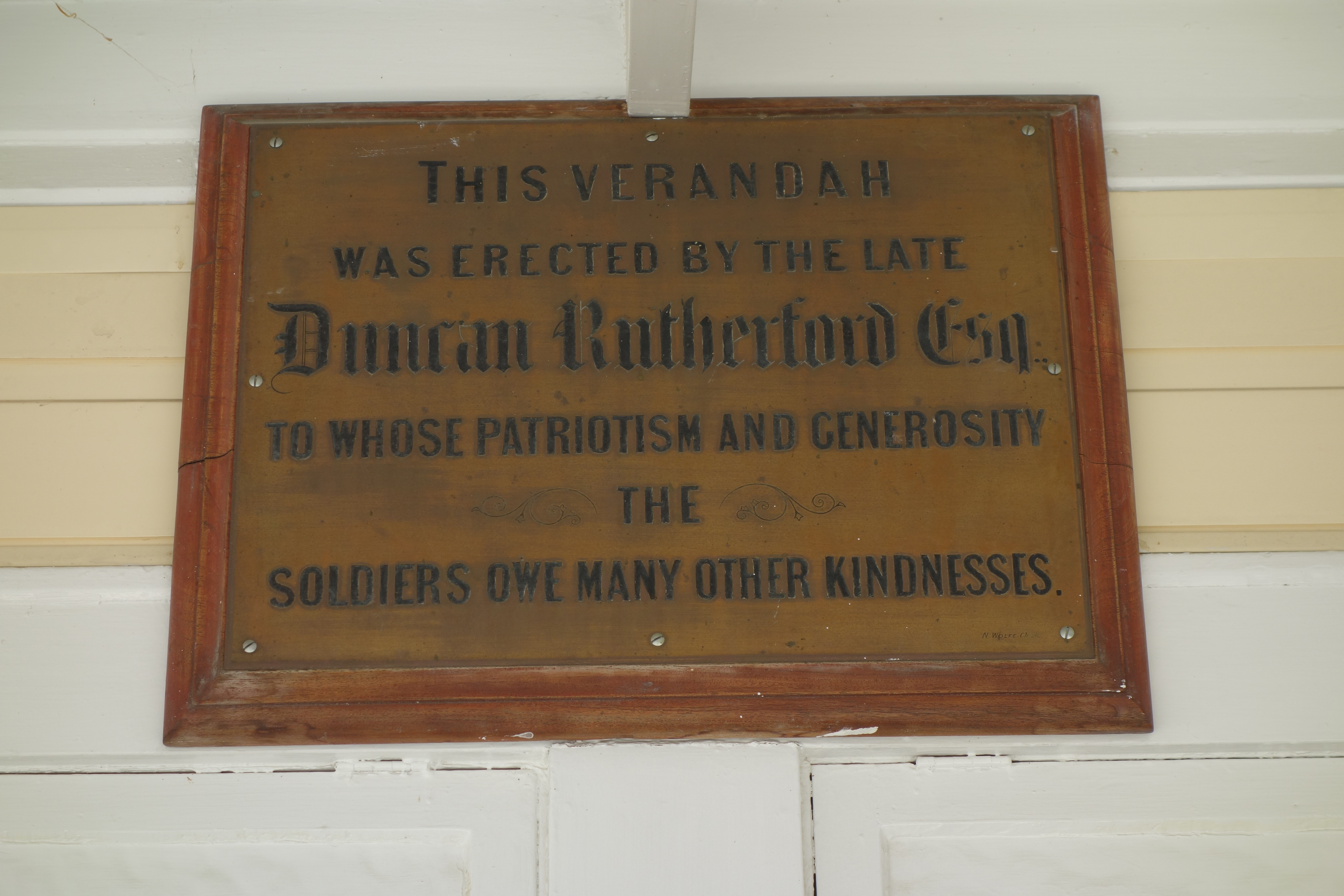
Plaque to commemorate construction of verandah in 1917.

The double-rotunda block was designed by the architects Hoggard, Prouse and Gummer. Similar style buildings were built in Featherston, Wellington and Rotorua but the Hanmer building is the only one remaining. It was opened in 1916 and contained two wards each of which had 60 beds. The wards were in the two rotunda at either end of the building which were connected by a long corridor containing single rooms. A large central hall in the middle was for meals, recreation and socialising. The two wards were called Joffre and Kitchener, after General Joffre and Lord Kitchener. The dining hall was named after the British nurse Edith Cavell. In 1917 a verandah was added to the front of the building, paid for by Duncan Rutherford.

After the Second World War more than 150 returned servicemen were housed in the Soldiers' Block. Male patients were accommodated in the block until the 1950s when the Rutherford Ward was finished. After that it was used for the therapy programme including occupational therapy from the 1950s to 1999, a school and special therapy programme for adolescents, the Hanmer Springs Village Library, and from 1990 the Taha Māori Treatment Programme. The renovated building has become a community facility.

The building was designed as to provide as much sunlight and airflow as possible, with the belief that sunlight and good airflow would help to heal the patients. The building has an octagonal shape with a high roof.

The block is protected by a New Zealand Heritage Category I status.

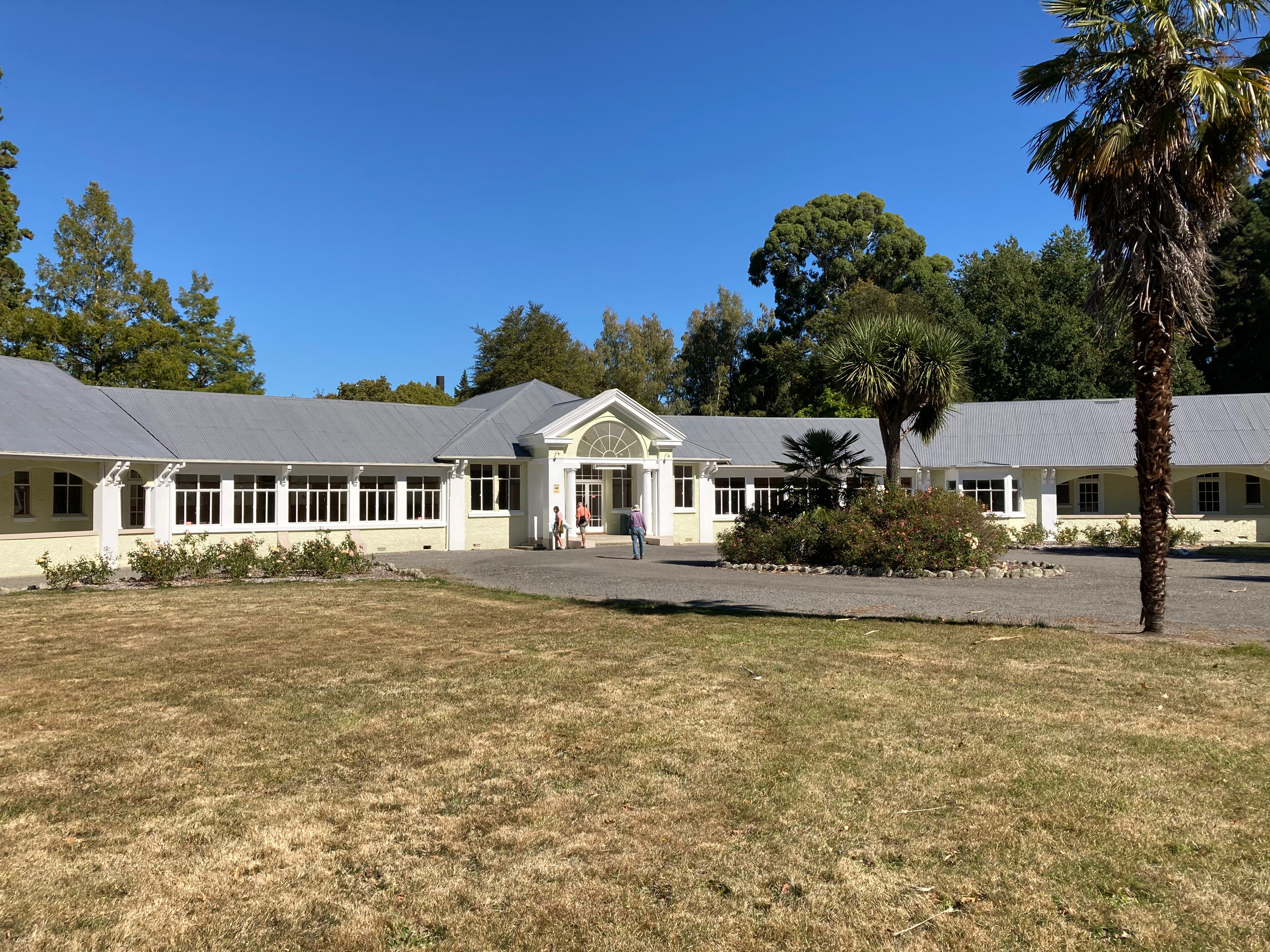
Chisholm Ward, 2021

=== Chisholm Ward ===
The Chisholm Ward, in the Arts and Crafts style, was designed by John T. Mair and the Public Works Department. It was named after Percy Chisholm, who had advocated for the construction of a ward for female psychiatric patients and the name was used from the 1950s. The ward was built in 1926 to house female psychiatric patients. Prior to the construction patients were housed in the nearby town. It had 55 beds. A dormitory, lounge and kitchen/dining area were in the centre with two wings of single rooms branching out.

Chisholm accommodated both men and women from 1976 to 2003.

The building is protected by a New Zealand Heritage Category I status. The Hurunui District Council commissioned a conservation plan for the ward which was completed in 2010.

=== Nurses' Hostel ===
The Nurses' Hostel, designed by John Mair, was built in 1929 to accommodate nurses who had previously lived in local houses. Before 1920 all the nurses were male. The hostel had 56 single rooms, lounges, library and study area.

The hostel building is protected by a New Zealand Heritage Category I status.

=== Rutherford Ward ===
The Rutherford Ward was built in the 1940s to replace the Soldiers' Block as accommodation for male patients. It was named after local sheep farmer and benefactor Duncan Rutherford. It had two dormitories and single rooms which housed 65 beds. It was built in the Art Deco style and designed to have a second storey though this was never built.

Other facilities in the block were hospital administration, the telephone exchange, the central kitchen from 1979, the pharmacy and the Hanmer district's medical centre and operating theatre.

=== Spiritual Garden and other gardens ===
The first medical superintendent, Percy Chisholm, encouraged tree planting. Species included chestnuts, redwoods, Pinus radiata, Scots pine, cherry trees and oak trees. The grounds between the Nurses' Hostel and the Chisholm Ward are planted with oak trees, a lawn and apple trees.

In the 1990s, on the south side of the Rutherford Ward, a spiritual garden was created, funded by donations from former patients. The original proposal from the former patients was for a chapel but it had long been felt that a non-denominational spiritual area would be more appropriate; this complemented the development of the Taha Māori programme with its emphasis on, and sensitivity to, Māori culture and spirituality. The garden was planted with native species, in contrast to the exotic trees planted earlier in the grounds. Native species would also be familiar to patients from different parts of New Zealand. The garden design was based on the shape of a tree with a walkway as a trunk and native trees forming the branches. There was a pond, three mounds representing faith, hope and charity and pebble gardens. Sculptures were integral to the design. Four poupou (carved posts), from Hokianga, the Bay of Islands and Kaikōura, were donated in 1991and erected at a special hui (gathering). The poupou were removed by Ngāi Tahu in 2005. The garden was used for a Creative New Zealand Sculptural Workshop in 1993. The artists in attendance were John McDougall, Eric Korewha, Carolyn Menzies and Phil Price.

A 2010 landscape report for the Hurunui District Council listed and assessed the trees and recommended that the spiritual garden be maintained.

=== Site Maintenance Engineer's Office/Old Smithy ===
Built in 1916 on the northern end of the Nurses' Hostel it is thought to have originally been a blacksmith's shop.

=== Gardener's Shed ===
Located south-east of the Chisholm Ward the gardener's shed was built c. 1900.

=== The Morgue ===
A small wooden morgue building, built in 1902, was re-located to the south of the Rutherford Ward in 1957 from its original site near the Soldiers' Block.

== Staff ==
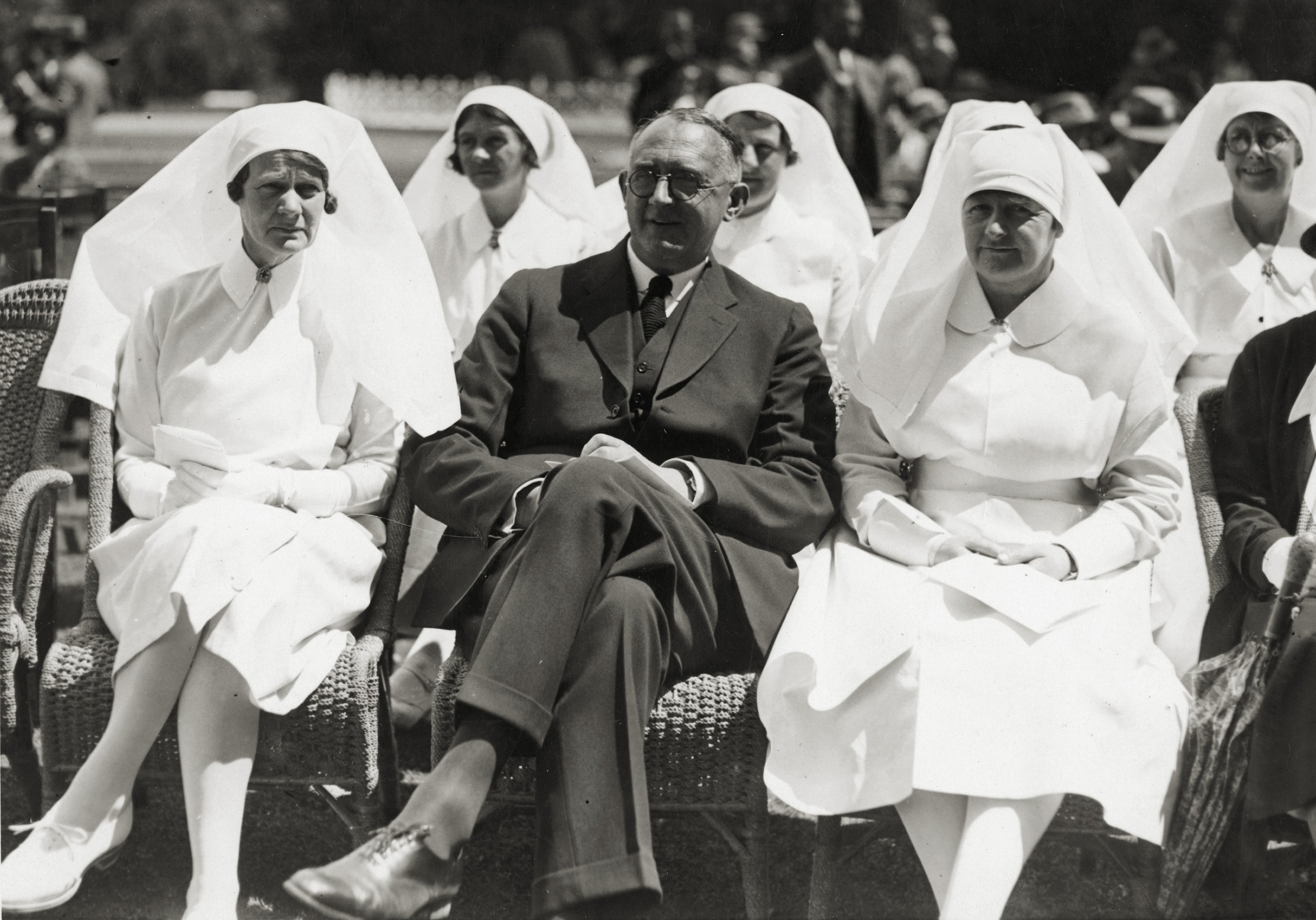
Dr Percy Chisholm and nurses

=== Doctors ===
- Captain A. Hendry, medical officer, 1916
- David Eardley Fenwick, Commanding Officer, 1916–1920
- Percy Chisholm, Commanding Officer, 1920; first medical superintendent, 1921–1943
- Archibald Wallace Wilkinson, medical superintendent, 1943–1964
- Tom Maling, medical officer, 1944–
- Upham Steven, interim medical superintendent, 1970s
- Robert Crawford, medical superintendent, 1976–1991

=== Nurses ===
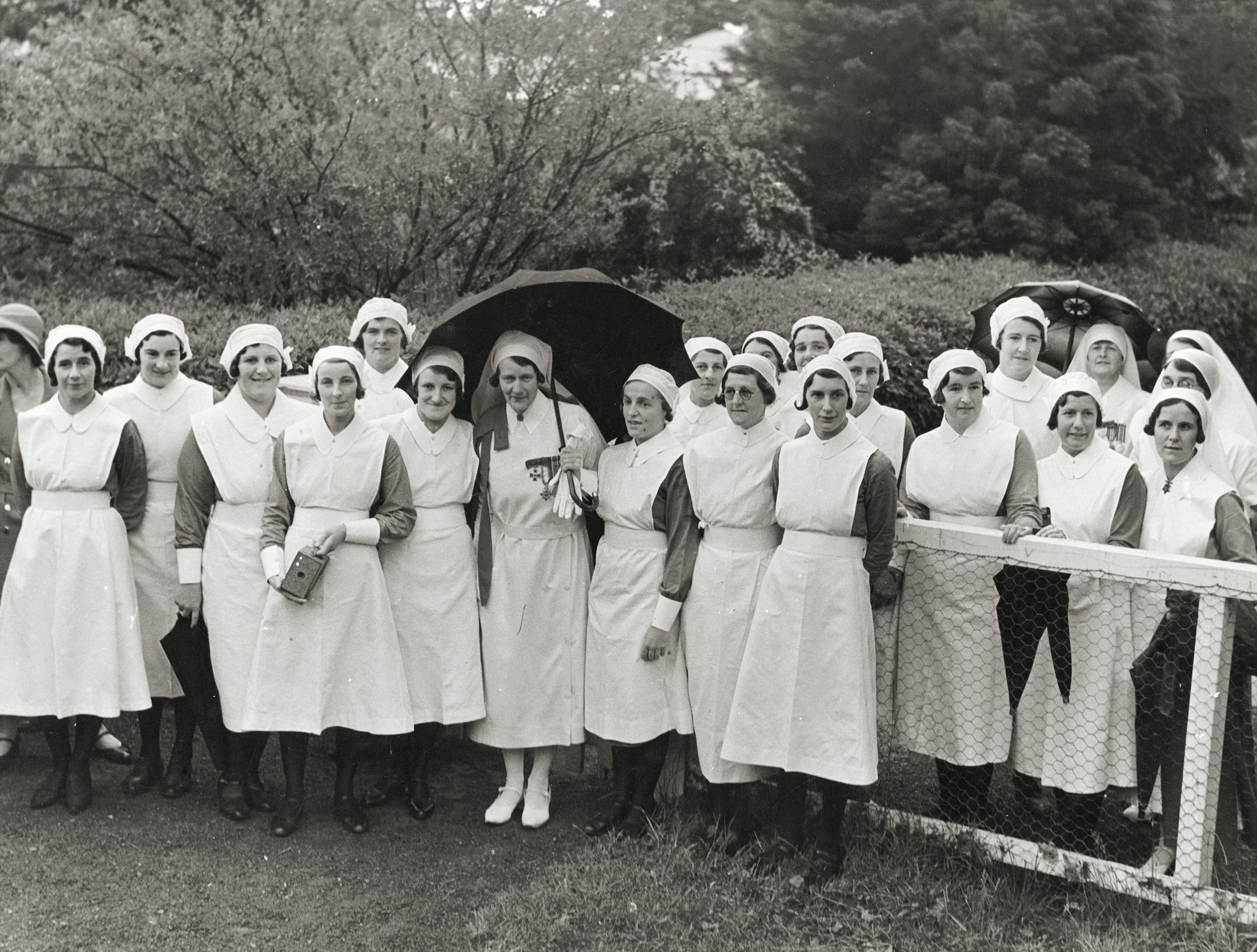
Nurses at Queen Mary, 1933

- Alice Holford, during WWI and after WW2
- Mary Looney, matron, after WWI
- Margaret Hitchcock, after WWI
- Edna Pengelly, matron, 1919–1921
- Mabel Thurston, matron, 1923–1924
- E. Brown, matron
- Emily Hodges, matron,1924–1938
- Christina McDonald, sub-matron, 1930s
- V.M. Trott, sister-in-charge, 1920; matron 1938–1946
- M.E. Petre, matron, 1959

== Gallery ==
Queen Mary Hospital

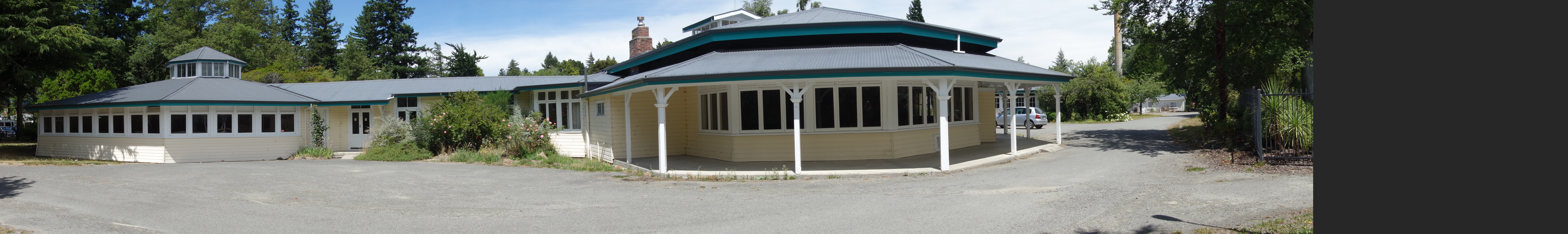
Soldiers' Block, 2015

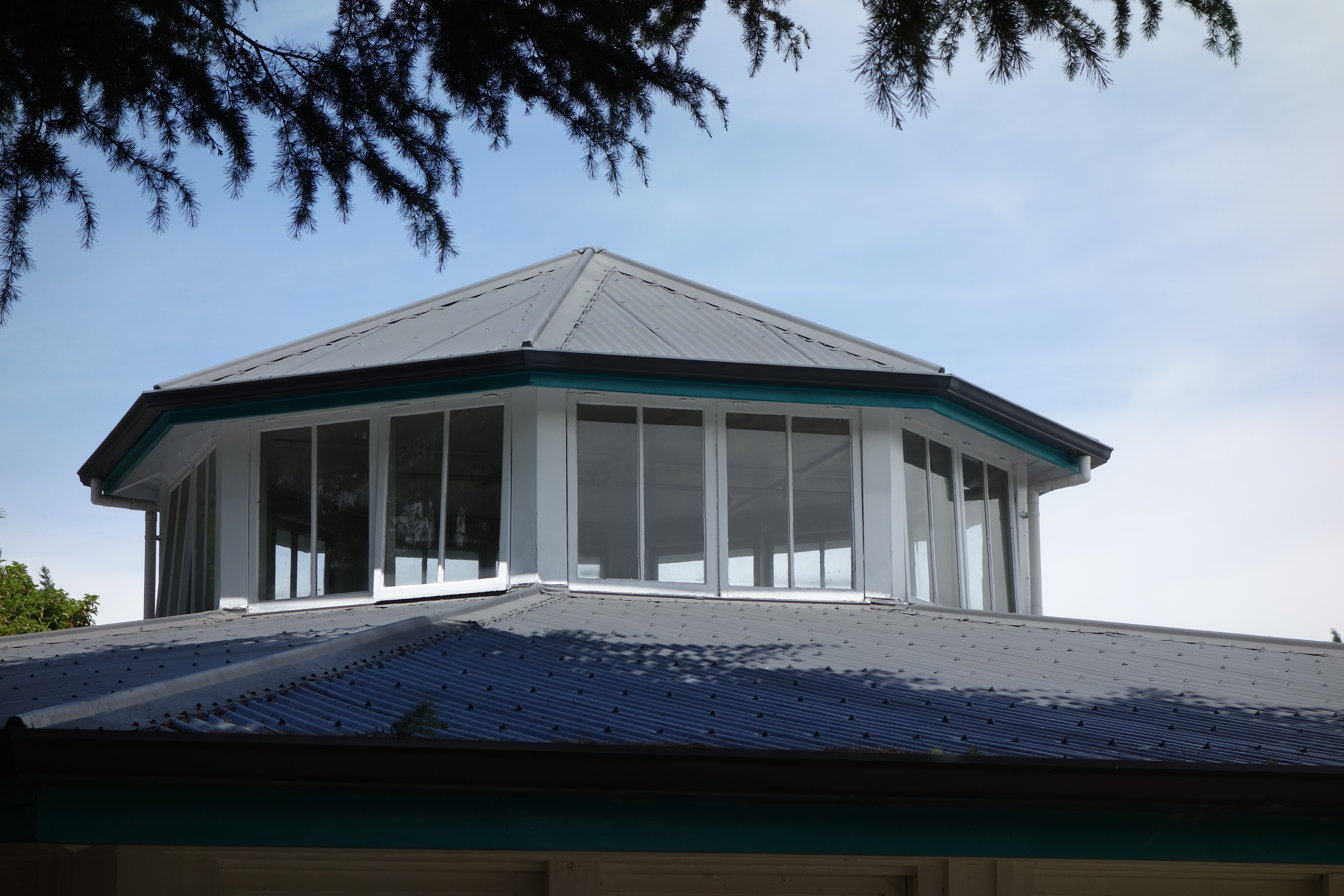
Soldiers' Block rotunda roof, 2015

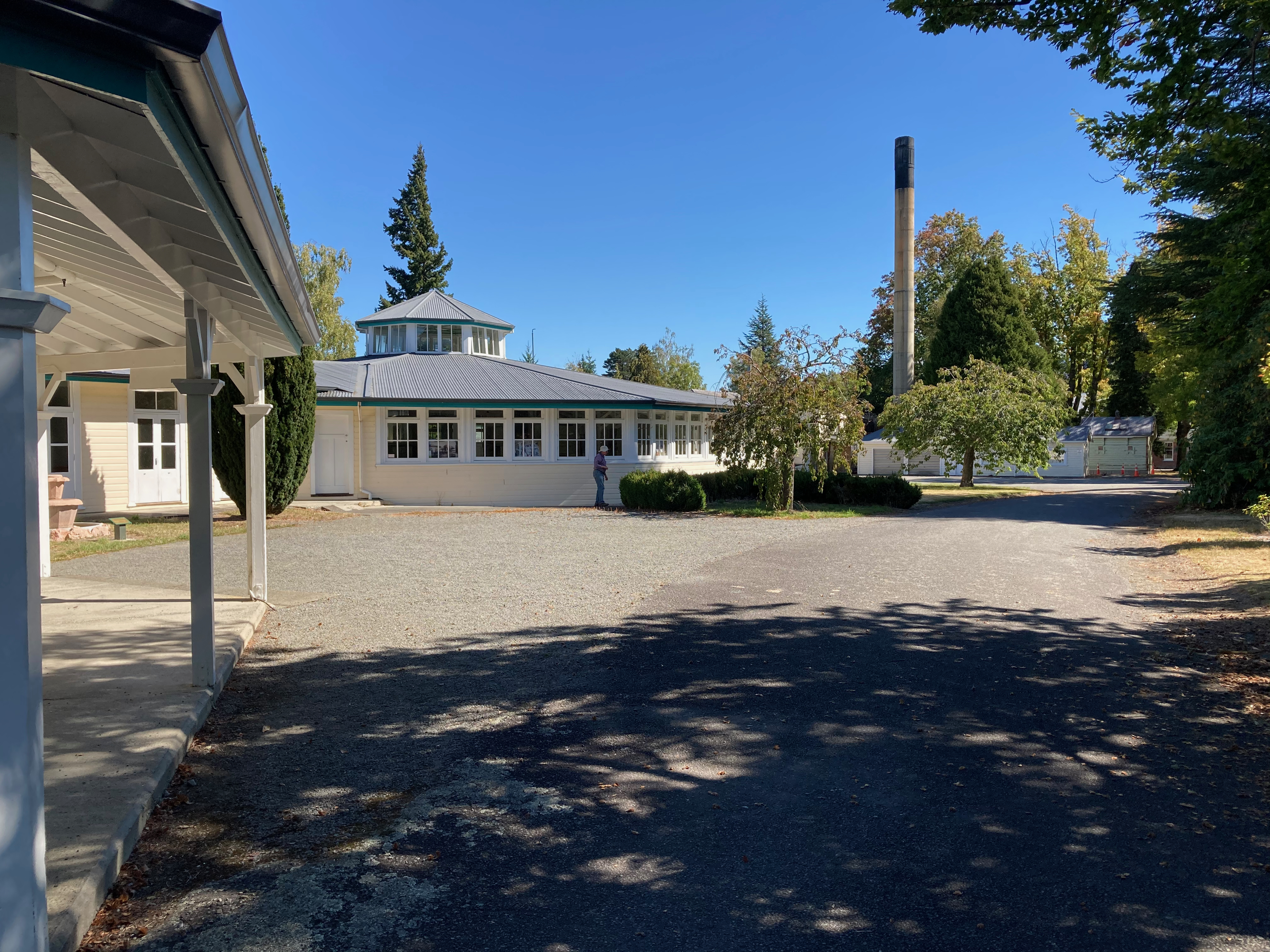
Soldiers' Block, 2021

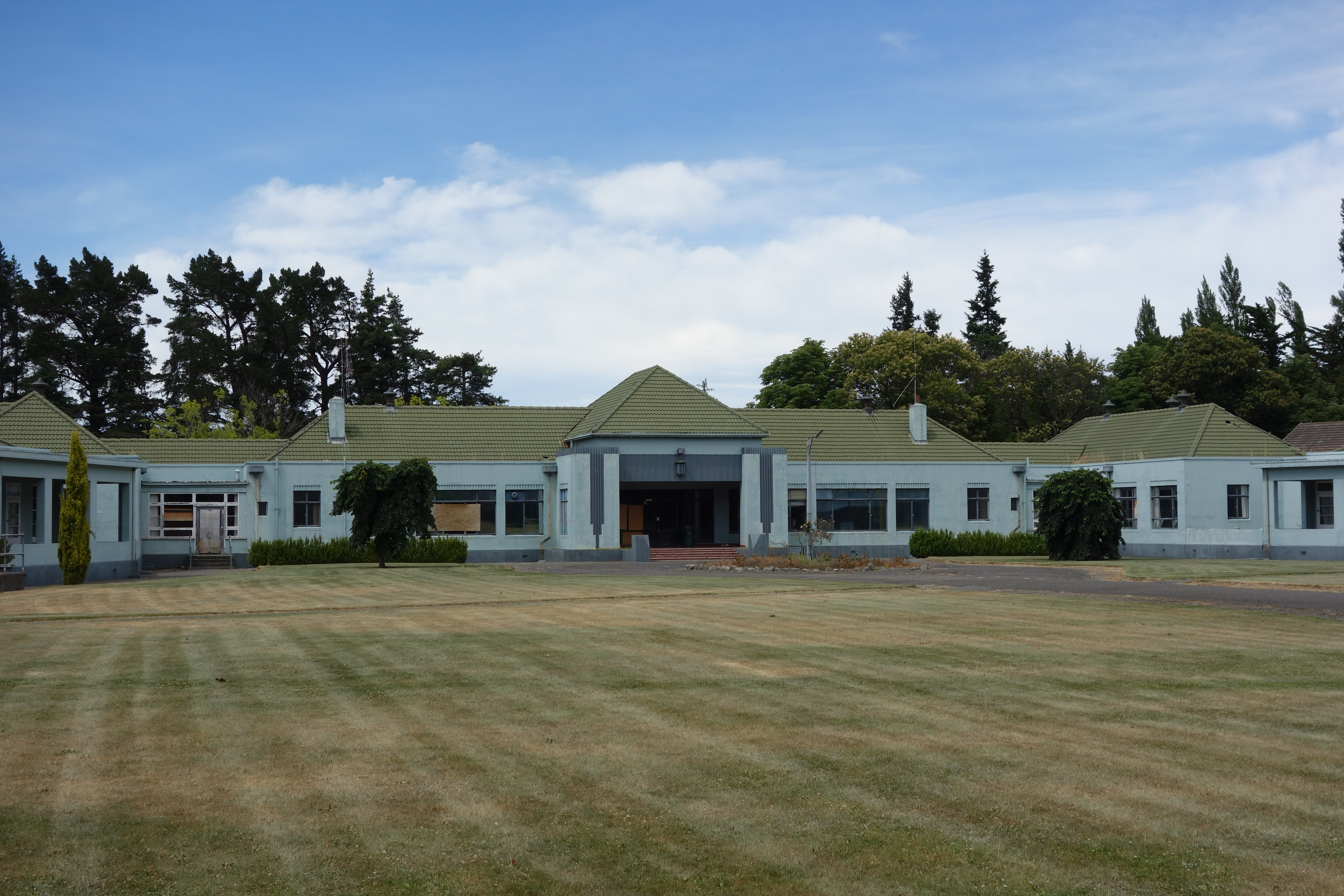
Rutherford Ward, 2015

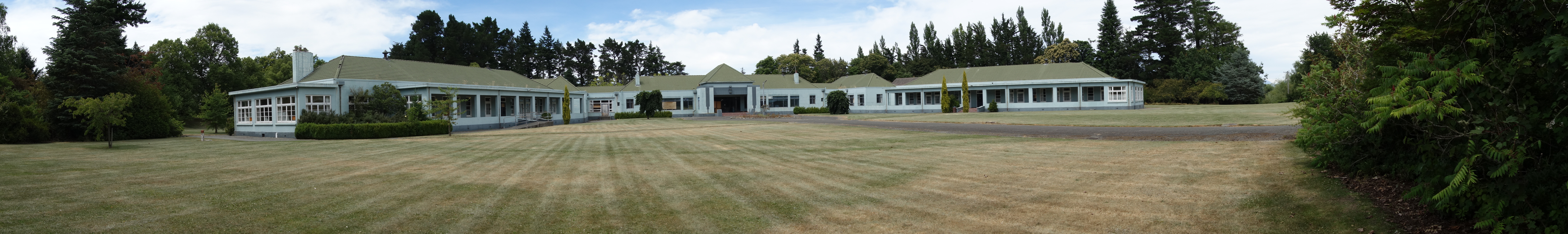
Rutherford Ward, 2015

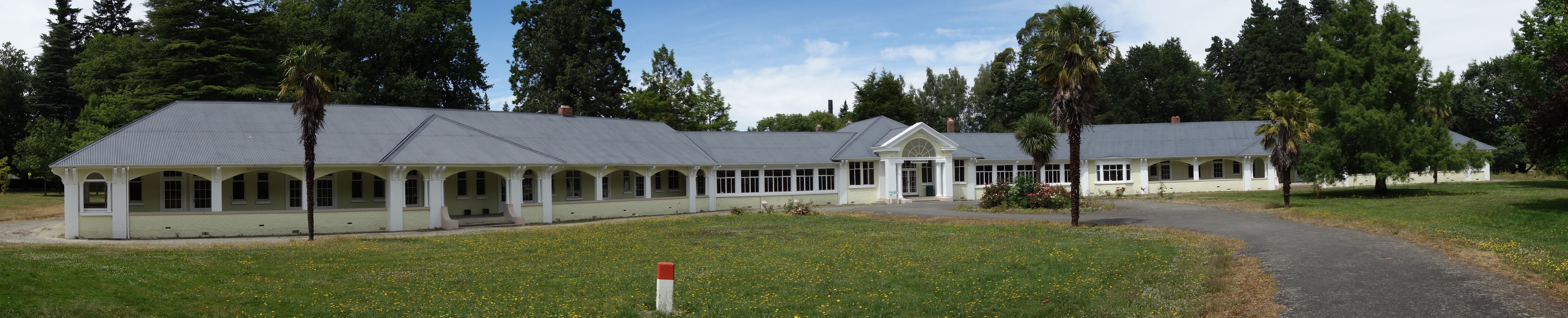
Chisholm Ward, 2015

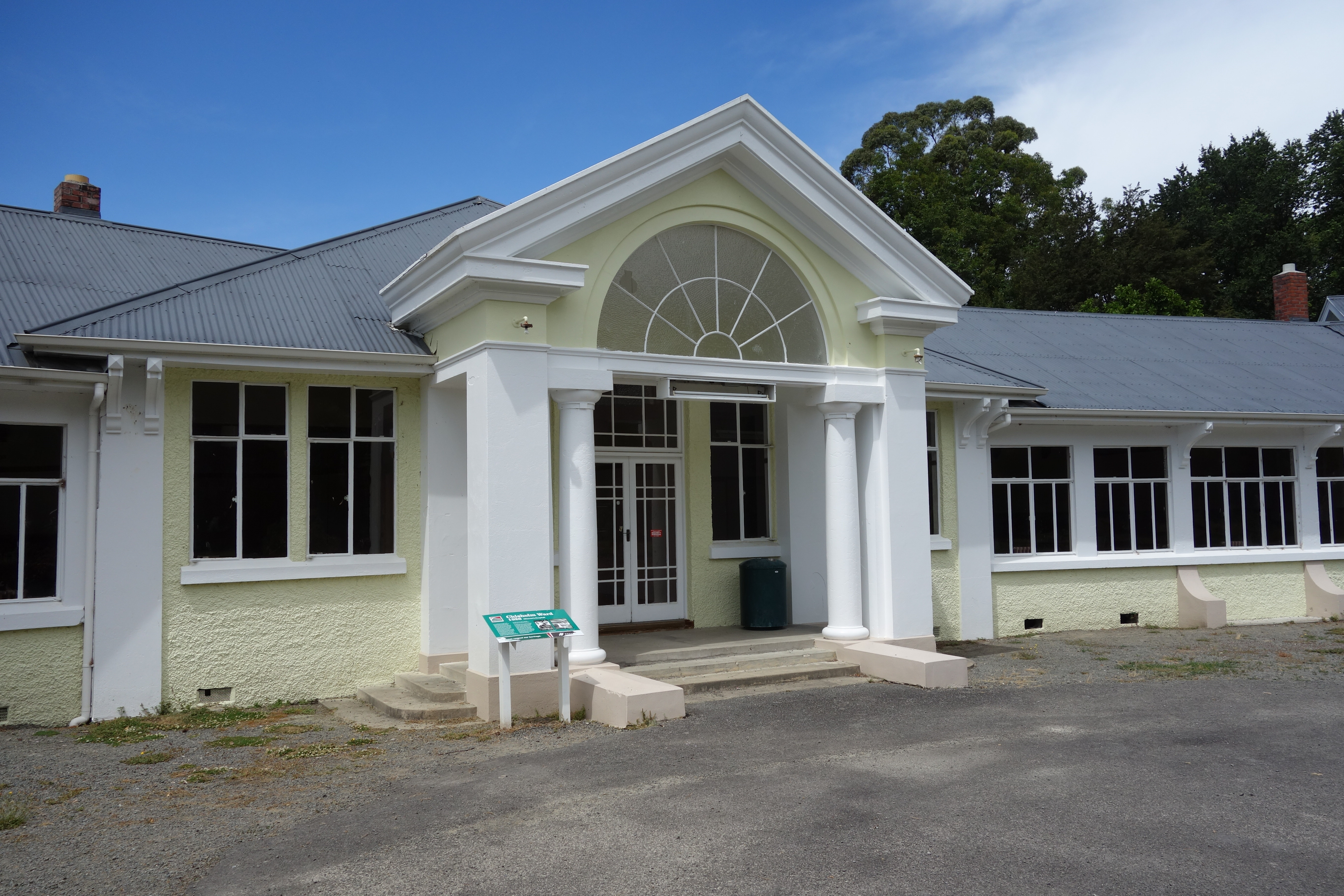
Chisholm Ward entrance, 2015

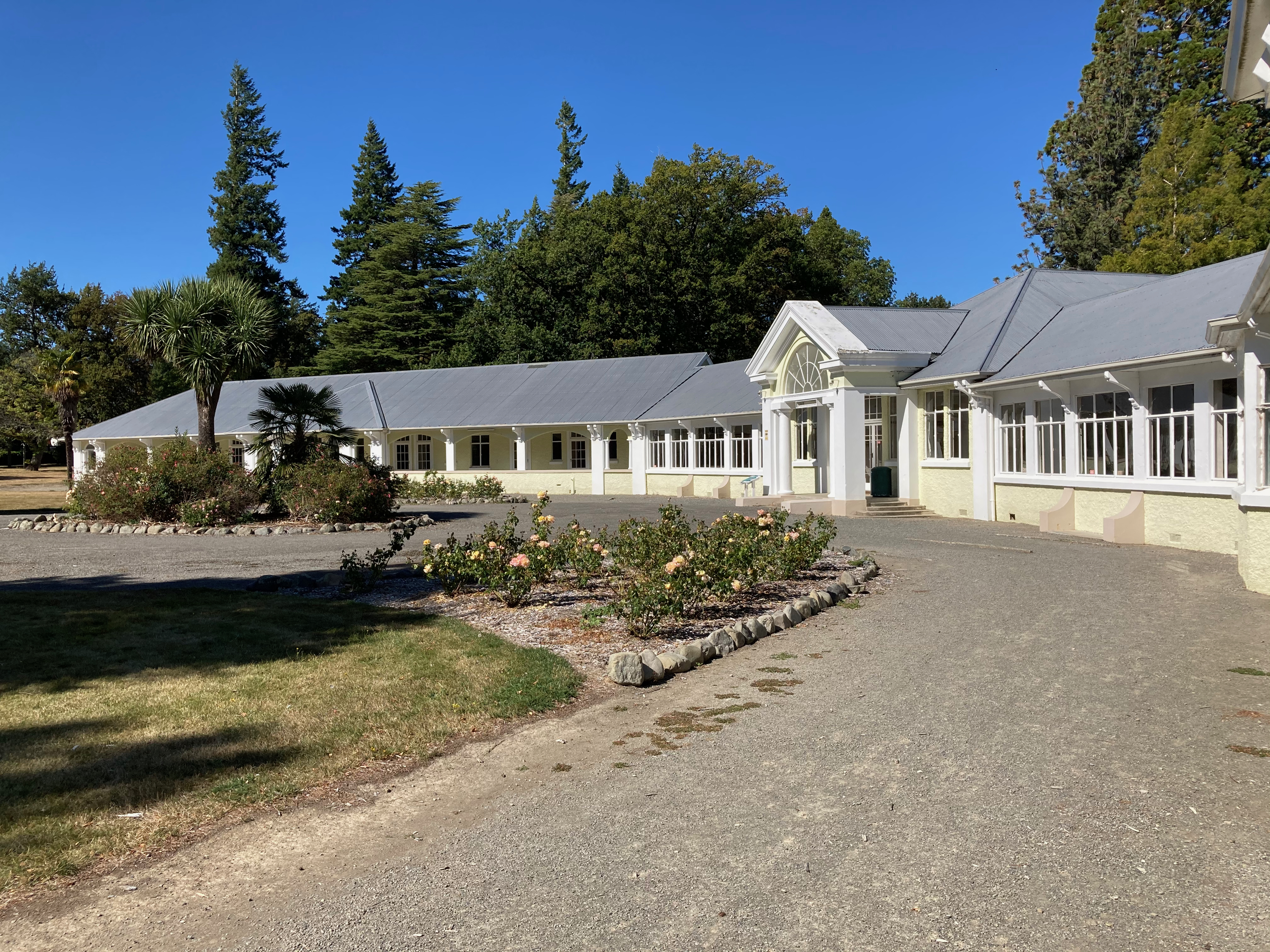
Chisholm Ward, 2021

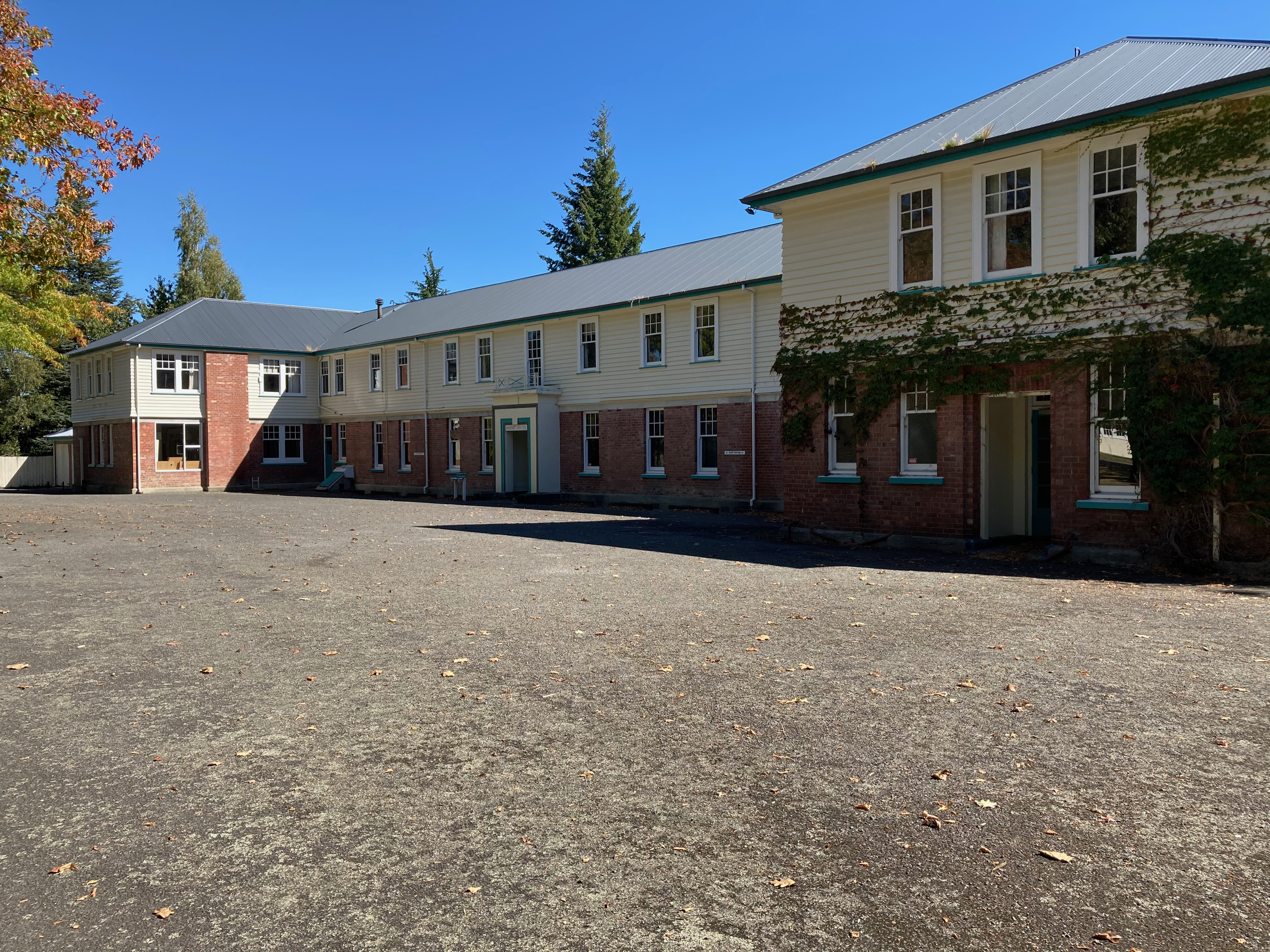
Nurses' Hostel, 2021
