= Grace Neill =

New Zealand nurse (1846–1926)

- Born: Elizabeth Campbell; 26 May 1846; Edinburgh
- Died: 18 August 1926 (aged 80)
- Education: Rugby
- Known for: Nurse's Registration Act,

Elizabeth Grace Neill (née Campbell; 26 May 1846 – 18 August 1926) was a nurse from New Zealand who lobbied for passage of laws requiring training and national registration of nurses and midwives; in 1901, New Zealand was the first country in the world to introduce such laws. The nursing experience she received during her early life inspired her to reform many aspects of the nursing practice, and her experience as a factory inspector led her to instigate other social reforms.

== Early life ==
Elizabeth Grace Neill was born 26 May 1846 in Edinburgh, Scotland. She was the oldest daughter of nine children born to James Archibald Campbell and Maria Grace of Barcaldine. Neill's father was a retired colonel of Argyll and Sutherland Highlanders, and he was also a deputy lieutenant of the county of Argyllshire and colonel of the militia in that area. Maria Grace was Campbell's second wife. In Campbell's household, discipline and intelligence were valued highly. Tall and red-headed, Elizabeth Neill was a very intelligent child and received a strong education. She was schooled partly at home and partly at a private school in Rugby. Her desire was to study medicine, which she undoubtedly would have done well at, but her father completely disapproved of her doing that. Instead she became a paying probationer nurse in St. John's House Sisterhood in London. This institution supplied nursing staff to both King's College Hospital and Charing Cross Hospitals. Elizabeth Neill easily completed her training in general nursing and midwifery. She then became the lady superintendent at the Pendlebury Hospital for Children near Manchester. She stayed there for two years until she met Dr. Channing Neill, whom she eventually married much to her father's dismay. He believed Dr. Neill was well below his daughter's social class. Neill had her mind made up, however, and married Dr. Neill anyway which resulted in her father casting her out of the family. The couple moved to Ryde, in the Isle of Wight, where they had their first and only son, James Oliver Campbell Neill.

== Career ==
Neill's husband moved to Queensland and set up a medical practice; in 1886, when Neill was thirty years old, she and their four-year-old son joined him there. Two years later, her husband died, and Neill turned to journalism to make a living. She was a sub-editor of the Boomerang and a freelance journalist for the Brisbane Daily Telegraph and the Courier. A year later she was appointed by the Queensland Government to a Royal Commission on working conditions for shop and factory workers. Combined with her work as a journalist, her knowledge of the problems associated with giving charitable aid led to her appointment in 1893 as the first female factory inspector in New Zealand. She was then also given a job as assistant inspector in the department in charge of hospitals, asylums and charitable aid. As only the third person working in that department, Neill had a huge workload and a lot of stress. However, it provided the opportunity for her to greatly influence that area of health care practice. Once another doctor, Frank Hay, was able to take over that position, however, Neill devoted herself to a project that would provide suitable nursing service for all of New Zealand.

== Contributions ==
Neill came up with the idea to require nurses to be registered to be able to practice. She knew this would protect the public and also the profession from unqualified people mal-practicing. She helped Dr. McGregor to draft a bill for a Nurse's Registration Act, and in 1901 it was finally passed by Parliament and was the first bill of its kind. The bill required nurses to have three years of training, a state examination, and a state register. While this fixed the problems with general practising nurses, it still did not require anything from midwives. It was imperative that something be established to train midwives in New Zealand. However, since there were only a few schools in New Zealand that trained for midwifery, this was a more challenging bill to pass. It was then put on Neill to create not only a curriculum for the midwifery training, but to also establish state maternity hospitals in which the training could occur. Her goal was to have hospitals that were for mothers, managed by women, and doctored by women. The hospitals were created for only a certain class of women, however. Only the respectable wives of working men could go there. Neill had no pity for the destitute woman, because Neill herself was a widow raising a child. Also, allowing destitute women into the hospitals would undermine the status of them, so they were excluded. Neill faced much opposition from doctors who thought that these hospitals would threaten their own incomes and control of the system. Finally, the Midwives Registration Act was introduced to Parliament by Richard Seddon in 1904. Seddon then initiated a set-up for the first state maternity hospital which would serve as a lying-in hospital for wives of the working class and as a training school for midwives. It was up to Neill to find a way to equip a suitable house within three weeks to set up this hospital. She was able to do so, and the first hospital opened on Rintoul Street, Wellington in June 1905. It was named St Helens Hospital in honour of Seddon, whose birthplace was in Lancashire, England. After this significant event in New Zealand's history, maternity hospitals began opening all over the country such as St Helens Hospitals in Dunedin (1905), Auckland (1906), and Christchurch (1907). These founding hospitals have played an important role in developing good care for maternity patients.

== Later life ==
Neill did not confine herself to New Zealand. In 1889 she was the principal speaker in the nursing section during the Congress of the International Council of Women in London. Due to her impact at this congress, she was made an honorary member of the Matron's Council of Great Britain. After that she served on a committee that drafted the constitution and bylaws for the International Council of Nurses. In 1901 she once again used her knowledge of social conditions to investigate the administration of charitable aid in Sydney for the government of New South Wales. Neill retired from her position with the New Zealand government and joined her son who had moved to the United States. However, her health continued to decline, so both she and her son moved back to New Zealand in 1909. There she resided until World War I, where she served as sister in charge of the children's ward at Wellington Hospital. After a long period of illness, she died on 18 August 1926, crippled and blind.

The Grace Neill Memorial Library was established at the nursing postgraduate school in Wellington in memory of Neill's contributions to New Zealand and nursing. The women's hospital at Wellington Hospital is called the Grace Neill Block.
