= 1944 Birthday Honours (OBE) =

The 1944 King's Birthday Honours, celebrating the official birthday of King George VI, were announced on 2 June 1944 for the United Kingdom and British Empire, New Zealand, and South Africa.

It included a large number of people who were appointed Officer of the Order of the British Empire (OBE).

The recipients of honours are displayed here as they were styled before their new honour, and arranged by honour, with classes (Knight, Knight Grand Cross, etc.) and then divisions (Military, Civil, etc.) as appropriate.

== Military Division ==
=== Royal Navy ===
- Acting Captain Harry Thomas Strawbridge. (Bearsden, Scotland).
- Commander John Gordon Aitchison, (Retd). (Havant).
- Commander Thomas Kerr, (Retd). (Kitale, Kenya).
- Commander Gordon Vincent Knight, (Retd).
- Commander Mark Taylor. (Fareham).
- Commander Robert Dymock Watson.
- Acting Commander the Honourable Richard Duke Coleridge, (Retd).
- Acting Commander John Trevor Powell.
- Acting Commander William Lavallin Puxley.
- Acting Temporary Commander Ronald Arthur Foort, RNR.
- Commander Norman Thomas Patterson, Royal Indian Naval Volunteer Reserve.
- Commander (E) Percival Hutchison Craven-Phillips.
- Commander (E) Norman Eric Dalton.
- Commander (E) John Darley Farrow. (Washington, Co. Durham).
- Commander (E) Richard Leslie Jordan. (Yelverton, Devon).
- Engineer Commander John William Renshaw, (Retd). (Twickenham).
- Acting Commander (E) Hector George Edmund Dobbs, (Retd). (West End, Hampshire).
- Acting Commander (E) Wilfred Mowbray Onyon, (Retd).
- Surgeon Commander John Gerrard Holmes, MD, BCh.
- Paymaster Commander Richard Mann Bolster. (Bedford).
- Paymaster Commander Maurice Hubert Knott.
- Paymaster Commander Jasper Parrott.
- Paymaster Commander Philip John Row. (Fareham).
- Paymaster Commander Dennis Shephard Wareham. (Newton Abbot).
- Acting Paymaster Commander Harold Garrett, RNVR.
- Captain (Acting Lieutenant-Colonel) George Barclay Grant, Royal Marines (Eastbuorne).
- Captain (Acting Lieutenant-Colonel) William Frank Paget Whitmarsh, Royal Marines (Brighton).
- Lieutenant-Commander George Fellowes Blaxland. (London).
- Lieutenant-Commander Walter John Rankine Campbell. (London).
- Lieutenant-Commander John Hubert Gretton. (Sydney, Australia).
- Lieutenant-Commander James Humphrey Walwyn. (St. John's, Newfoundland).
- Acting Lieutenant-Commander Herbert Charles Bicknell, (Retd). (Plymouth).
- Acting Temporary Lieutenant-Commander The Honourable Ewen Edward Samuel Montagu, RNVR.
- Acting Temporary Lieutenant-Commander Robert Archibald Nisbet, RNVR. (Hampton, Middlesex).
- Temporary Acting Lieutenant-Commander Frederick William Fitzjohn Oldham, RNVR. (Guildford).
- Major Arthur Henry Rede Buckley, Royal Marines (Plymouth).
- Major George Harvie Morris, Royal Marines.
- Captain Sydney Seward Chatres Thomson, Master, Mercantile Fleet Auxiliary (Kingstone, Hereford).
- Chief Officer Gladys Octavia Snow, WRNS (Upham, Southampton).
- Acting Commander Rupert Basil Michel Long, Royal Australian Navy.

=== Army ===
- Major (temporary Lieutenant-Colonel) Burton Edward Abbott, 13th Frontier Force Rifles, Indian Army.
- Major (temporary Lieutenant-Colonel) Monawar Khan Afridi, MD, Indian Medical Service.
- Lieutenant-Colonel Vincent Henry Ludovici Anthonisz, Ceylon Medical Corps.
- Major (temporary Lieutenant-Colonel) Ernest Ashford (412), Royal Indian Army Service Corps.
- Lieutenant-Colonel Edward Malcolm Ashton, Indian Army.
- Captain (temporary Major) (local Lieutenant-Colonel) Herbert Henry Bacon (10316), retired pay, late The Devonshire Regiment.
- Lieutenant-Colonel (Staff Paymaster 1st Class) (temporary Colonel and Chief Paymaster) Francis Talbot Baines (22885), Royal Army Pay Corps.
- Lieutenant-Colonel (temporary Colonel) Cecil Disney Barlow (31868), The King's Shropshire Light Infantry.
- Lieutenant-Colonel Frederick Thomas Bass, MC, Lancashire Home Guard.
- Major (temporary Lieutenant-Colonel) Houstoun Douglas Bennie, TD, (34679), Royal Artillery (Territorial Army).
- Lieutenant-Colonel Harold John Bensted, MC, (15778), Royal Army Medical Corps.
- Lieutenant-Colonel (temporary Colonel) Leonard Beswick (33426), Royal Army Service Corps, Territorial Army.
- Major (temporary Lieutenant-Colonel) Douglas Leonard Betts (34384), Royal Artillery.
- Major (temporary Lieutenant-Colonel) Douglas Luke Halcomb Boycott, MBE, (45584), Royal Army Service Corps.
- Senior Commander (temporary Chief Commander) Belinda Margaret Graeme Boyle (192091), Auxiliary Territorial Service.
- Colonel Reginald Womack Brooks, TD, (22349), Army Cadet Force (Suffolk).
- Major (temporary Lieutenant-Colonel) Anthony Bull (111733), Royal Engineers.
- Major (temporary Lieutenant-Colonel) (local Colonel) Richard Albert Arthur Byford, MVO, (116071), Army Catering Corps.
- Major (temporary Lieutenant-Colonel) William Tait Campbell (58085), The Royal Scots (The Royal Regiment).
- Major (temporary Lieutenant-Colonel) John Charles Denton Carlisle, DSO, MC, (98734), Intelligence Corps.
- Major (temporary Lieutenant-Colonel) Henry Charles Carrigan (15614), The Suffolk Regiment.
- Lieutenant-Colonel Muirhead Collins Clayton, DSO, DL, Isle of Ely Home Guard.
- Major (temporary Lieutenant-Colonel) John James Burke Cole, MC, (135292), Pioneer Corps.
- Lieutenant-Colonel (Quartermaster) George Abel Collier (9654), Royal Army Medical Corps.
- Captain (temporary Major) (temporary Lieutenant-Colonel) Thomas Denner Corpe (36192), Royal Armoured Corps (Territorial Army).
- Major (temporary Lieutenant-Colonel) George Lyle Craig (14414), Royal Armoured Corps.
- Major (temporary Lieutenant-Colonel) William Dale (112637), Royal Army Medical Corps.
- Major (temporary Lieutenant-Colonel) Francis Joseph Davis (15875), The Queen's Royal Regiment (West Surrey), Reserve of Officers.
- Major (temporary Lieutenant-Colonel) Christopher Robson Dudgeon, MC, (15374), Royal Army Medical Corps.
- Major (temporary Lieutenant-Colonel) Evert Johannes De Wet (87358), South African Defence Force.
- Major (temporary Lieutenant-Colonel) Robert Symon Duncan, Indian Engineers, Indian Army.
- Major (temporary Lieutenant-Colonel) Denis Cuthbert Capel-Dunn (64026), The Essex Regiment, Territorial Army.
- Major (temporary Lieutenant-Colonel) (acting Colonel) John Henry Murray Edye, DSO, MC, (8320), The York and Lancaster Regiment.
- Major (temporary Lieutenant-Colonel) Thomas James Fielding (79688), Royal Corps of Signals (Supplementary Reserve).
- Major (temporary Lieutenant-Colonel) Leonard Barratt Shepherd-Folker (13342), The Lincolnshire Regiment.
- Major (temporary Lieutenant-Colonel) Edward John Foord (36597), General List.
- Major (temporary Lieutenant-Colonel) Robert Craig Gibb (99192), Royal Army Ordnance Corps.
- Colonel Newton Gott Gibson, MC, Anti-Aircraft, Home Guard.
- Major (temporary Lieutenant-Colonel) Argyle Henry Gillmore (33689), The Worcestershire Regiment.
- Lieutenant-Colonel Charles Montague Goodall, MC, Leeds Home Guard.
- Major (temporary Lieutenant-Colonel) Arthur Nicholas Gosselin (6521), The Royal Scots Fusiliers.
- Major (temporary Lieutenant-Colonel) Harry Greenwood, VC, DSO, MC, (141511), Pioneer Corps.
- Major (temporary Lieutenant-Colonel) Robert Norman Harrison (60433), Reserve of Officers, Royal Army Service Corps.
- Lieutenant-Colonel Robert Humphrey Haslam, DL, JP, Hertfordshire Home Guard.
- Major (temporary Lieutenant-Colonel) Albert Henry Hawkins (86772), Royal Artillery, (Territorial Army).
- Lieutenant-Colonel Charles Stanley Munro Heape, MC, (20654), Royal Artillery (Territorial Army).
- Major (temporary Lieutenant-Colonel) Peter Rivers Hicks (126452), The Queen's Own Royal West Kent Regiment.
- Lieutenant-Colonel Frederick William Charles Hill, TD, (23400), Royal Artillery (Territorial Army).
- Senior Commander (temporary Chief Commander) Bridget Holmes a Court (192251), Auxiliary Territorial Service.
- Lieutenant-Colonel Arnold Francis Hooper, TD, Kent Home Guard.
- Lieutenant-Colonel Ernest Roland Hopewell, MC, TD, Surrey Home Guard.
- Lieutenant-Colonel (Ordnance Officer 2nd Class) (temporary Brigadier) Gerald Tom Warlters Horne (14273), Royal Army Ordnance Corps.
- Major (temporary Lieutenant-Colonel) Charles Storrs Howard (33685), The Somerset Light Infantry (Prince Albert's).
- Lieutenant-Colonel Norman Richard Hunting, MC, Lindsey Home Guard.
- Lieutenant-Colonel (temporary Colonel) William Henry Hynes (13770), The Royal Inniskilling Fusiliers.
- Lieutenant-Colonel Leslie Harrison Jaques, MC, (24879), General List, Territorial Army.
- Major (temporary Lieutenant-Colonel) Marcus Jelley, TD, (36358), Royal Artillery (Territorial Army).
- Lieutenant-Colonel (local Colonel) Mervyn Robert Keene, 9th Jat Regiment, Indian Army.
- Lieutenant-Colonel Gerald East King, East African Pioneer and Labour Corps.
- Major (temporary Lieutenant-Colonel) Robert Charles Moss King (28105), The West Yorkshire Regiment (The Prince of Wales's Own).
- Lieutenant-Colonel Sidney James Kneale, Manx Home Guard.
- Lieutenant-Colonel (temporary Colonel) Lucien Austin William Braddon Lachlan (5246), Reserve of Officers, The Gloucestershire Regiment.
- Major (temporary Lieutenant-Colonel) Eustace Vaughan Lang (28282), The Durham Light Infantry.
- Lieutenant-Colonel (temporary Colonel) Henry Fitzroy Grace Langley (103732), Reserve of Officers, Royal Artillery.
- Lieutenant-Colonel Bertram John Leigh, MIAH, AMIMechE, Indian Army Ordnance Corps.
- Major (temporary Lieutenant-Colonel) Arthur Patrick Lillie, The Buffs (Royal East Kent Regiment), Territorial Army, Reserve of Officers.
- Lieutenant-Colonel (temporary Brigadier) Edward Stewart Lindsay (39464), Royal Artillery.
- Colonel (temporary Brigadier) William Walter Linney, Indian Army Ordnance Corps.
- Colonel Walwin Gerald Mack, Ceylon Light Infantry.
- Lieutenant-Colonel (acting Colonel) George Mackie, MD, MB, Worcestershire Home Guard.
- Lieutenant (acting Lieutenant-Colonel) Edward Frank Maltby (35117), Royal Corps of Signals.
- Lieutenant-Colonel (temporary Colonel) Hugh Pennycuick Maltby (9016), Royal Artillery.
- Captain (temporary Major) Wilfred Robert Manton (86242), Royal Artillery.
- Major (temporary Lieutenant-Colonel) William Woodward Manton, TD, (30491), The Cheshire Regiment (Territorial Army).
- Lieutenant-Colonel Reginald Matthews, Indian Army.
- Major (temporary Lieutenant-Colonel) Keith Grant McDonald (38854), Australian Imperial Forces.
- Major (temporary Lieutenant-Colonel) Robert Samuel McLernon, TD, (41676), Royal Artillery (Territorial Army).
- Major (temporary Lieutenant-Colonel) Henry Keith Purvis-Russell-Montgomery (13734), The Black Watch (Royal Highland Regiment), Territorial Army.
- Lieutenant-Colonel Tom Morgan, MC, Monmouthshire Home Guard.
- Captain (temporary Major) John Henry Mott (39288), The York and Lancaster Regiment.
- Colonel Sir Alfred Law Mowat, Bt, DSO, MC, DL, Leeds Anti-Aircraft Home Guard.
- Lieutenant-Colonel Frederick Dudley Culley Newport, Kent Home Guard.
- Major (temporary-Colonel) Leslie William Norfolk (52347), Royal Engineers (Territorial Army).
- Lieutenant-Colonel (local Colonel) William Neilson Powell, MC, Indian Armoured Corps.
- Lieutenant-Colonel (Brevet Colonel) Montague Frederick Radclyffe, MC, (1301), Royal Armoured Corps.
- Captain (temporary Major, Staff Paymaster 2nd Class) Richard Walter Kimbel Randall, MBE, (32989), Royal Army Pay Corps.
- Lieutenant-Colonel (temporary Colonel) (temporary Brigadier) Ralph Anthony Riddell (14835), The Queen's Royal West Kent Regiment.
- Lieutenant-Colonel John Ridley Robb, Northumberland Home Guard.
- Lieutenant-Colonel Henry Trevor Rogers, Hampshire Home Guard.
- Major (temporary Lieutenant-Colonel) Donald Ross, Indian Armoured Corps, Indian Army.
- Captain (temporary Major) Lawrence Sherwood (111445), Army Catering Corps.
- Lieutenant-Colonel Thakur Ranjit Singh, Jaipur State Forces.
- Major (temporary Lieutenant-Colonel) Harry Neville Smith, 5th Mahratta Light Infantry, Indian Army.
- Major (temporary Lieutenant-Colonel) Samuel Harold Smith, MC, (104933), Territorial Army Reserve of Officers, Special List.
- Lieutenant-Colonel Sydney Rodger Smith, Dundee Home Guard.
- Major (temporary Lieutenant-Colonel) Augustus Courtney Spincer, TD, (26272), Royal Artillery, Territorial Army.
- Major (temporary Lieutenant-Colonel) Ernest Stanton (51351), Royal Engineers (Territorial Army).
- Major Thomas Henry Langdale Stebbing, MBE, MC, MA, (19470), Army Educational Corps.
- Lieutenant-Colonel (Brevet Colonel) (temporary Colonel) Archibald Stirling (3397), The Argyll and Sutherland Highlanders (Princess Louise's).
- Lieutenant-Colonel James Logan Strang, Edinburgh Home Guard.
- Major (temporary Lieutenant-Colonel) Charles Cuthbert Strong (6900), The York and Lancaster Regiment.
- Lieutenant-Colonel Herbert Guy Thomson, DSO, Devon Home Guard.
- Lieutenant-Colonel Gerard Lionel Tomkins, MC, 10th Baluch Regiment, Indian Army.
- Major (temporary Lieutenant-Colonel) Richard Trenam, MBE, MC, (5340), retired pay, late The Royal Northumberland Fusiliers.
- Captain (Quartermaster) (temporary Major) George Frederick Turner, MBE, DCM, (95781), Grenadier Guards.
- Lieutenant-Colonel Walter Clarence Turner, Middlesex Home Guard.
- Major (temporary Lieutenant-Colonel) James Edward Fitzgerald Vogel (5086), New Zealand Military Forces.
- Major (honorary Lieutenant-Colonel) Newton Lloyd Wade, TD, (16885), late Royal Artillery, Territorial Army Reserve of Officers.
- Lieutenant-Colonel George Henry Walker, DSO, Southern Rhodesia Military Forces.
- Lieutenant (temporary Major) Richard Walter (93834), The Royal Warwickshire Regiment, Territorial Army.
- Major (temporary Lieutenant-Colonel) Alexander Francis Wemyss, MC, (46513), Reserve of Officers, General List.
- Lieutenant-Colonel (temporary Brigadier) Gerald Carr-White, Indian Armoured Corps, Indian Army.
- Lieutenant-Colonel George Augustus Whitworth, Cornwall Home Guard.
- Major (temporary Lieutenant-Colonel) Frank Williamson (16023), Reserve of Officers, Royal Artillery.
- Major (temporary Lieutenant-Colonel) (acting Colonel) John Christopher Temple Willis (19240), Royal Engineers.
- Major (temporary Lieutenant-Colonel) Charles Pearce Germon Wills (172), The Worcestershire Regiment.
- Major (temporary Lieutenant-Colonel) Jack Wolton (111270), Royal Engineers.
- Lieutenant-Colonel (temporary Colonel) Donald Boden, Australian Imperial Forces.
- Major (temporary Lieutenant-Colonel) Bernard Joseph O'Loughlin, Australian Imperial Forces.
- Lieutenant-Colonel Alfred Henry William Evenden, New Zealand Military Forces.
- Chief Commander Vida Eliza Jowett, New Zealand Women's Auxiliary Army Corps.

=== Royal Air Force ===
- Group Captain Arthur Dwight Ross, Royal Canadian Air Force.
- Wing Commander Pinder Allerston (35021).
- Wing Commander John Beaumont, AFC, (24242).
- Wing Commander William Hugh Biddell, DFC, (37376).
- Wing Commander George Blinman (21118).
- Wing Commander Frederick George Carle (31072).
- Wing Commander Oliver Chance Cassells, DFC, (74824), RAFVR.
- Wing Commander Frederick Herbert Catton (35089).
- Wing Commander John Connell (31174).
- Wing Commander George Raymond Albert Deacon, MC, (02114).
- Wing Commander Desmond Lloyd George Douglas, DFC, (Aus.171), Royal Australian Air Force.
- Wing Commander Arthur Regester Fane de Salis (36046).
- Lieutenant-Colonel Charles Murray Shand Gardner, DFC, (P.102705), South African Air Force.
- Wing Commander Richard Drope Gough (35102).
- Wing Commander Herbert Mead Culham Harwood (31046).
- Wing Commander Ernest Reginald Hoare (31145).
- Wing Commander William Rees John (73769), RAFVR.
- Wing Commander Joseph Kemper, MBE, (01182), Reserve of Air Force Officers.
- Wing Commander Charles Douglas Kershaw (90470), Auxiliary Air Force.
- Wing Commander Archibald Norman Kingwill, AFC, (70785), Reserve of Air Force Officers.
- Lieutenant-Colonel Nelson Arnold McGregor, DFC, (103776), South African Air Force.
- Wing Commander Arthur Phillip Morley (77488), RAFVR.
- Wing Commander George Henry Morley (23164), FRCS, LRCP.
- Wing Commander Thomas Edward Price, Rhodesian Air Askari Corps.
- Wing Commander Dennis Fenn Rixon, DFC, (39393).
- Wing Commander Campion Aubrey Rumball (23127).
- Wing Commander (now Acting Group Captain) Fred Rump (34028).
- Wing Commander William Squires (35070).
- Wing Commander (now Acting Group Captain) Charles Rupert Taylor (34057).
- Acting Wing Commander Russell Faulkner Aitken, AFC, (39839).
- Acting Wing Commander Edward William Anderson, DFC, (83847), RAFVR.
- Acting Wing Commander Charles Edward Banks (84585), RAFVR.
- Acting Wing Commander Gilbert Lawrence Blake (06225), Reserve of Air Force Officers.
- Acting Wing Commander Percy Brown (43498).
- Acting Wing Commander Reginald Koostra Budge (73111), RAFVR.
- Acting Wing Commander Harold Cadman (35219).
- Acting Wing Commander Harold Vincent Campbell (73783), RAFVR.
- Acting Wing Commander Reginald Walter Christmas (36098).
- Acting Wing Commander Arthur Chamberlain Pitt Clayton, DFC, (Can/C. 18639), Royal Canadian Air Force.
- Acting Wing Commander Leonard Stanley Nelson Barnett Faulkner (75937), RAFVR.
- Acting Wing Commander Patrick Douglas Finn (88336), RAFVR.
- Acting Wing Commander Michael Joseph Grennan (35170).
- Acting Wing Commander Alfred Hall (31485).
- Acting Wing Commander John Hugh Lapsley, DFC, (33320).
- Acting Wing Commander William Alfred John Lawrence (73777), RAFVR.
- Acting Wing Commander Patrick Walter Loveday (77751), RAFVR.
- Acting Wing Commander Kenneth George Major (44209).
- Acting Wing Commander Hubert Angelo Meredith, MBE, (60873), RAFVR.
- Acting Wing Commander David Dewar Millar (Can/C.3576), Royal Canadian Air Force.
- Acting Wing Commander Allan William Millson (41861).
- Acting Wing Commander Alan Stewart Orr (79958), RAFVR.
- Acting Wing Commander Ronald Cooper Rotherham, DFC, (33374).
- Acting Wing Commander James Scrimgeour (90444), Auxiliary Air Force.
- Acting Wing Commander Michael Vyvyan Spurway (87381), Reserve of Air Force Officers.
- Acting Wing Commander Gordon Caryl Tidd (31196).
- Acting Wing Commander Harold Lawrence Whitlock (35381).
- Acting Wing Commander Alec Leslie Whittaker (35317).
- Acting Wing Commander Donald John Wiseman (72450), RAFVR.
- Squadron Leader Cuthbert Montague Crothers (102681), RAFVR.
- Squadron Leader Victor Charles Jarvis (43862).
- Squadron Leader James Lee (21280).
- Squadron Leader Ernest Harry Mallia (75712), RAFVR.
- Squadron Leader Cecil William Mayhew, MC, (79289), RAFVR.
- Squadron Leader Hugh Murray (21264).
- Squadron Leader Maurice Ashdown Newnham, DFC, (75897), RAFVR.
- Squadron Leader Brian Pashley Young (33376).
- Acting Squadron Leader Horace Adcock (82314), RAFVR.
- Acting Squadron Leader Charles Herbert Baker (47591).
- Acting Squadron Leader Alexis Banister (85070), RAFVR.
- Acting Squadron Leader Alan Clement Herbert Barchard (64749), RAFVR.
- Acting Squadron Leader Eric Seymour Brown (43228).
- Acting Squadron Leader Wilfred Gordon Clegg (83955)i RAFVR.
- Acting Squadron Leader James Cecil Crockard (43901).
- Acting Squadron Leader Joseph Jonas Dennis (45364).
- Acting Squadron Leader Roger Herbert Francis (79458), RAFVR.
- Acting Squadron Leader Reginald Edward Dillon Greet (65668), RAFVR.
- Acting Squadron Leader Francis Norman Hargreaves (76236), RAFVR.
- Acting Squadron Leader Herbert Priestley (73352), RAFVR.
- Acting Squadron Leader Frederick Eden Ratcliffe (44796).
- Acting Squadron Leader Edmund Francis Walter Truscott (82358), RAFVR.
- Acting Squadron Leader Frederick Stephen Turner (44912).
- Acting Squadron Leader Anthony Armstrong Willis, MC, (89008), RAFVR.
- Honorary Acting Squadron Leader David Evans, Southern Rhodesian Air Force.
- Squadron Officer Joan Anne Williams (84), Women's Auxiliary Air Force.
- Acting Group Captain Henry Arthur Winneke, Royal Australian Air Force.
- Wing Commander Stanley Francis Reid, Royal Australian Air Force.

== Civil Division ==
- John Jackson Adams, JP, Secretary of the Cumberland Development Council.
- Alexander Aikman, Managing Director, The Grangemouth Dockyard Co. Ltd.
- Captain Percy Duncan Allen, Master, Merchant Navy.
- Captain Archibald McGillvray Anderson, Master, Merchant Navy.
- Harry Clifford Armstrong, MInstCE, Chairman of the Technical Panel of the Sheffield & Rotherham District Industrial Fuel Efficiency Committee.
- David Walker-Arnott, MBE, Director of Audit, Ministry of Pensions.
- The Honourable Barbara Baird, MBE, Regional Administrator, North Midland Region, Women's Voluntary Services for Civil Defence.
- Lancelot Ballan, MInstT, District Superintendent, Hull, London & North Eastern Railway Co.
- Walter Lawrence Beeby, Chairman of the Executive Committee, Manchester Panel, Emergency Services Organisation.
- Frederick Samuel Bennett, MBE, Chief Constable, Metropolitan Police.
- Nina Bishop, Commandant of a British Red Cross Society Auxiliary Hospital near Derby.
- Captain Erele Wilmont Black, Master, Merchant Navy.
- Walter Stanley Bourne, Clerk in Charge of Prosecutions, Board of Trade and Ministry of Fuel & Power.
- Stanley Bowman, Head of the Production Department, British American Tobacco Co.
- Charles Edward Brady, President, Harrow District Air Training Corps.
- William Braidwood, Chief Engineer Officer, Merchant Navy.
- Captain Surrey Douglas Bumstead, Master, Merchant Navy.
- Charles Francis Jack Francis-Carter, ARIC, AMIChemE, Controller and General Manager, No.'s 1 & 2 Metal & Produce Recovery Depots, Ministry of Aircraft Production.
- Sidney Henry Charters, Fire Force Commander, No. 14 (Portsmouth) Area, National Fire Service.
- Richard William Barnes Clarke, Planning Officer, Ministry of Production.
- Captain William James Coates, JP, DL, County Chief Commissioner for Boy Scouts, North Riding of Yorkshire.
- Robert Copeland, Chief Engineer Officer, Merchant Navy.
- Thomas Cogswell, lately Borough Treasurer and Chief Billeting and Rehousing Officer, Lewisham.
- Alexander Bookless Craig, Principal Fire Staff Officer to the Scottish Home Department.
- Cecil Crampton, Superintending Scientist, Admiralty Signal Establishment.
- George Bertram Crossley, Chief Engineer Officer, Merchant Navy.
- James Sellar Cruickshanks, Chief Engineer Officer, Merchant Navy.
- John Noel Dark, Principal, Ministry of Health.
- Charles Davidson, Chief Engineer Officer, Merchant Navy.
- Major Henry James Davis, Superintending Valuer, War Office.
- Eric Frank de Lattre, Chief Accountant, Navy, Army & Air Force Institutes.
- George Dickson, Vice-Chairman, London & South Eastern Regional Board, Ministry of Production.
- Ernest Edwin Diggory, Clerk of the Wye Catchment Board.
- Captain Thomas Sidney Dixon, Master, Merchant Navy.
- John Mathieson Dodds, Head of the Research Department, Metropolitan Vickers Electrical Co. Ltd.
- John Edwin Dowty, Assistant Director of Army Contracts, War Office.
- Captain Frederick John Flett Duguid, Captain Superintendent of the Gravesend Sea School.
- John Duncan, Head Master of Lankhills Special School, Winchester.
- William Aver Duncan, Deputy Director of Signals, Air Ministry.
- Captain Richard Stephens Durham, DSC, Master, Merchant Navy.
- Reginald George Early, Principal Scientific Officer, Armament Research Department, Ministry of Supply.
- Lieutenant-Colonel Arthur Clement Edwards, Honorary Secretary for Gloucestershire, Soldiers', Sailors' & Airmen's Help Society.
- David Jones Edwards, Chief Engineer Officer, Merchant Navy.
- Irene Rosetta Ewing, MSc, Ellis Llwyd Jones Reader, Department of Education of the Deaf, the Victoria University of Manchester.
- Captain George Fiddler, Master, Merchant Navy.
- Charles Edward Fielding, Director, A. V. Roe & Co. Ltd.
- Nigel Corbet Fletcher, MB, BCh, MRCS, LRCP, Surgeon in Chief, St. John Ambulance Brigade.
- Wheaton Thomas Freestone, Deputy Chairman and Works Manager, Peter Brotherhood Ltd.
- William Gairns, Deputy Director of Accounts, Ministry of Aircraft Production.
- Captain Frederick Charles Gambrill, Master, Merchant Navy.
- George Edmund Gilbey, Chairman of Managers, Tennal Approved School.
- Captain Donald Gillies, Master, Merchant Navy.
- Fred Gray, General Manager, Imperial Chemical Industries (Metals) Ltd, Small Arms Ammunition Factory.
- Harold Percy Grindrod, RD, (Commander, RNR, Retd), Staff Captain, Merchant Navy.
- George Thomas Guest, Air Raid Precautions Controller, Denbighshire.
- Evelyn Bligh, Lady Gunston, Director of the Residential Nurseries conducted by the Anglo-American Relief Fund. For services to Civil Defence.
- Captain John Charles Harrington, Senior Captain, British Overseas Airways Corporation.
- Harry Norman Harrison, Vice-Chairman, Ministry of Supply Industrial Council.
- Herbert Edward Harrowell, JP, Chairman of the York & District Assistance Board Advisory Committee.
- Evan Llewelyn Harry, Executive Officer, Glamorgan War Agricultural Executive Committee.
- Frank Woolley-Hart, Chairman of the National Association of Coke and by-product Plant Owners. For services to Civil Defence.
- Sydney Charles Hooper, Principal, Ministry of Labour & National Service.
- Wing Commander John Kenneth Robert Howard, RAFVR, Civil Assistant, Air Ministry.
- John Henry Iles, Founder and Director of the National Band Festival.
- Amy Verden Irwin, Manager of the Perth Prisoners of War Food Parcels Packing Depot, British Red Cross Society (Scottish Branch).
- Bailie George Izatt, JP, Convenor of the Education Committee, Fife County Council.
- Lieutenant-Colonel Edward Darby Jackson, DSO, Joint Secretary, Territorial Army Associations of the Counties of Berwick, Roxburgh & Selkirk.
- Henry Biddulph Jackson, Assistant Regional Salvage Officer, No. 9 (Midland) Region, Ministry of Home Security.
- Captain John Edgar Jackson, Master, Merchant Navy.
- Captain James Campbell Jamieson, Master, Merchant Navy.
- Councillor Phil Johnson, JP, Mayor and Air Raid Precautions Sub-Controller, Faversham.
- Edward Wickerson Jones, Regional Officer, United Kingdom Commercial Corporation.
- Arthur William Keeble, MBE, Principal, Ministry of Agriculture & Fisheries.
- Roy Dyson Langdale Kelham, MRCS, LRCP, Principal Medical Officer, Ministry of Pensions.
- Edward Hertslet William Wingfield King, District Probate Registrar, Wakefield and York.
- Frank Challis-King, Chairman of the Ipswich Emergency Committee.
- Victor Albert George Lambert, Director of Ordnance Factories (Engineering), Ministry of Supply.
- Stenard Ernest Andrew Landale, DPhil, PhD, Superintending Experimental Officer, Admiralty Signal Establishment.
- Francis Philip Laurens, Works Superintendent, Vickers-Armstrongs Ltd.
- Frederick Measham Lea, DSc, FRIC, Assistant Director of Building Research, Department of Scientific & Industrial Research.
- William Thomas Leicester, Vice-Chairman, Staff Side, Civil Service National Whitley Council.
- Leslie Linzell, ARIC, Technical Director, Pictorial Machinery Ltd.
- Captain John Andrew Little, Master, Merchant Navy.
- Richard Alfred Hardwick Livett, ARIBA, Chief Billeting Officer and Housing Director, Leeds.
- George Sail Campbell Lucas, Head of the Electrical Development Section, British Thomson Houston Co. Ltd.
- Frank Annesley Lyon, Administrator and Secretary, Seamen's Hospital Society.
- Donald Macadie, Chief Engineer Officer, Merchant Navy.
- Edmund Henry Erskine McCann, District Officer, Bristol Assistance Board.
- Captain William McCreadie, Master, Merchant Navy.
- Charles Philip McDuell, MBE Fire Force Commander, No. 36 (London) Area, National Fire Service.
- Peter Alexander Macfarlane, Chief Engineer Officer, Merchant Navy.
- John McCracken Mackie, Principal Assistant, Meals Services, London County Council.
- Captain Donald Moore McVicar, Captain of Aircraft, North Atlantic Service.
- Arthur Markham, Chief Engineer Officer, Merchant Navy.
- Captain Egerton Gabriel Baynes Martin, Master, Merchant Navy.
- Major John Cecil Masterman, Civil Assistant, War Office.
- Herbert James Medway, Chairman, British Mantle Manufacturers' Association.
- Ian Coshieville Menzies, WS, Secretary, Scottish Seed and Nursery Trade Association.
- Florence Rebecca Mitchell, General Secretary, College of Midwives.
- Ruby Esme Mitchell, Honorary Secretary Northern Ireland District, Soldiers', Sailors' & Airmen's Families Association.
- Major Frederick Thomas Monk, MC, Chairman of the Birmingham Civil Defence Committee.
- Philip George Gregory Moon, Resident Director, Bournemouth Gas & Water Co.
- Alfred Leslie Moore, Assistant Director, Ministry of War Transport.
- James Alexander Moore, Higher Collector, Board of Customs & Excise.
- Alderman Martin Stothart Moore. For public services in Leamington.
- Major Geoffrey Stirling Newall, JP, DL, Deputy County Army Welfare Officer for Durham.
- Robert Franklin Newman, JP, General Manager, John I. Thornycroft & Co. Ltd.
- Rachel Halley Chaine-Nickson, Honorary Organiser, Cheshire County Comforts Fund.
- John Ernest Nicole, LMSSA, DPM, Medical Superintendent, Winwick Emergency Hospital, Warrington.
- Commander Robert Tennant McClure Park, RNVR (Retd), Chief Marine Superintendent, Coast Lines Ltd.
- Henry Paterson, Chief Engineer Officer, Merchant Navy.
- John Paton, Works Manager, Central Workshops, Fife Coal Co. Ltd.
- Henry James Peacock, Assistant Superintendent of the Line, South Wales, Great Western Railway Co.
- Herbert Halford Pickering, JP. For public services in Market Harborough.
- Councillor Arthur Pickles, JP, Chairman of the Emergency Committee, Halifax.
- Robert Martin Poulter, Senior Meteorological Officer, Group Headquarters, Royal Air Force.
- Mabel Henrietta Prichard, MBE. For services as Chairman and Member of various Trade Boards.
- Captain Hugh Breckenbridge Provan, Master, Merchant Navy.
- Alfred Grenvile Pugsley, DSc, Superintendent, Royal Aircraft Establishment.
- Captain Herbert Stanley Reavley, Master, Merchant Navy.
- Harold George Reed, Town Clerk and Air Raid Precautions Controller, Deptford.
- Walter James Rees, DSc, FCS, Technical Adviser to the Foundry Bonding Materials Control.
- William David Reid, Air Raid Precautions Controller, Aberdeen.
- Captain William Willson Rickard, Master, Merchant Navy.
- Hugh Campbell Robertson, MC, Chief Commissioner, National Savings Committee.
- Lieutenant-Colonel Thomas Argyll Robertson, Civil Assistant, War Office.
- John Henry Robinson, Divisional Superintendent of Operations, London Midland & Scottish Railway Co.
- Norman Ventress Robson, Chief Engineer Officer, Merchant Navy.
- Allan George Rodger, HM Inspector of Schools, Scottish Education Department.
- Colin Donald Ross, Executive Officer, Devonshire War Agricultural Executive Committee.
- William Arthur Rutter, Assistant Director of Works, Ministry of Works.
- Albert Ernest Ryland, Telephone Manager, Newcastle upon Tyne, General Post Office.
- William Edward Salt, Secretary, Bristol Regional Committee, Central Advisory Council for Adult Education in the Forces.
- Lieutenant-Colonel Frank Reyner Salter, Area Welfare Officer, Eastern Command.
- Councillor Thomas Sawers, Chairman of the Air Training Corps Committee, Edinburgh.
- Captain Alexander Mercer Scobbie, Master, Merchant Navy.
- Elizabeth Purdie Scott, Convener of the Ladies' War Executive Committee of the Glasgow and West of Scotland Branch of the Navy League.
- David Radford Serpell, Temporary Principal, Ministry of Fuel & Power.
- Herbert John Shelley, HM Staff Inspector of Technical Schools, Board of Education.
- Alderman Arthur Shepherd, JP, Chairman of the Hull, Beverley & District War Pensions Committee.
- Harold Frank Shrimpton, House Governor, Birmingham Children's Hospital. For services to Civil Defence.
- Basil Futvoye Marsden-Smedley, Adviser to Postal and Telegraph Censorship, Ministry of Economic Warfare.
- James Henry Smethurst, JP. For public services in Warrington Chairman of Warrington Infirmary.
- Captain Robert Alfred Smiles, Master, Merchant Navy.
- Harry Peter Smollett, Director, Ministry of Information.
- Captain Arthur James Elvin Snowden, Master, Merchant Navy.
- Robert de Stapeldon Stapledon, Colonial Administrative Service Administrative Officer, Office of the Minister Resident in West Africa.
- Gilbert De Witt Stewart, Chief Engineer Officer, Merchant Navy.
- Robert Henry Sturges, General Manager, Stockton Construction Co. Ltd.
- Alderman Fred Percival Sudbury, JP, Chairman, Derbyshire Air Raid Precautions Executive Committee.
- William Swire, MBE, Honorary Treasurer, Leyland Savings Committee.
- Alderman Charles Stephen Syrett, Vice-Chairman of the Finchley Civil Defence Committee.
- Frank Tate, Chief Engineer Officer, Merchant Navy.
- William John Tawse, Chief Engineer Officer, Merchant Navy.
- Alderman Margery Taylor, JP, Chairman of the Public Assistance Committee of the Northumberland County Council.
- Ernest Fairchild Terry, FSI, First Class Valuer, Board of Inland Revenue.
- James Jamieson Thorn, JP, Chairman of the Aberdeen Juvenile Advisory Committee.
- Percy James Tickle, Accountant, Postal and Telegraph Censorship Department, Ministry of Information.
- Captain Edward Torrens, Master, Merchant Navy.
- Robert George Towns, Chief Engineer Officer, Merchant Navy.
- James Leslie Tuck, Senior Experimental Officer, Ministry of Supply.
- Ann Tulloch, Matron, Stobhill Hospital, Glasgow. For services to the Civil Nursing Reserve.
- John Watson Vaughan, Secretary and Solicitor to the Locomotive Manufacturers' Association.
- John Edward Wall, Director, Ministry of Food.
- Thomas Mark Watson, Chief Constable of Walsall.
- William Gordon Welchman, Employed in a Department of the Foreign Office.
- Lieutenant-Commander Eric Welsh, RNVR, Employed in a Department of the Foreign Office.
- Robert William Mouat Wilkens, Chief Engineer Officer, Merchant Navy.
- Captain John Jenkins Williams, Master, Merchant Navy.
- Alexander Wilson, Principal, Ministry of Education, Northern Ireland.
- Augustus Alexander Wilson, Chief Engineer Officer, Merchant Navy.
- George Hugh Wilson, JP, Lately Provost of Kilmarnock.
- Joseph Worssam, General Manager, Eastern Counties Omnibus Co. Ltd.
- James Asher, British subject resident in the Argentine Republic.
- Ethel Marguerite Bucknall, MBE, British subject resident in Portugal.
- Joseph Catoni, MBE, His Majesty's Consul at Alexandretta.
- Eric Edmund Raitt Church, lately British Council representative in Brazil.
- George William Gerrard, Registrar of His Majesty's Consular Court for Egypt.
- Lionel Henry Lamb, His Majesty's Consul at Minneapolis.
- Bryce James Miller Nairn, British Vice-Consul at Marrakesh.
- George Montague Payne, Assistant Port Director, Basra.
- Stewart Perowne, Public Relations Attaché in His Majesty's Embassy at Bagdad.
- John Helm Smith, formerly His Majesty's Consul at Antananarivo.
- John Lucas Willoughby, Assistant Traffic Manager, Sudan Railways.
- Rita Mary Buxton. For public and philanthropic services in the State of Victoria.
- Gerald Stanley Doyle. For public services in Newfoundland.
- Charles Eickhoff, Deputy Speaker and Chairman of Committees in the first two Parliaments of Southern Rhodesia. For public services.
- Edward Thomas Henderson, JP, member of the Mildura City Council, Stete of Victoria, for many years. For services to Mildura.
- The Reverend Percy Ibbotson, Organising Secretary of the Federation of Native Welfare Societies in Southern Rhodesia.
- John Neil McGilp, Chairman of the Land Board, Deputy President of the Board of Management of the State Bank, State of South Australia.
- Dugald Niven, Librarian, Bulawayo Public Library, and a Trustee of the National Museum, Southern Rhodesia. For public services.
- Stuart Evelyn Abbott, Indian Civil Services, Secretary to the Premier, Punjab.
- William George Alcock, Liaison Officer and Secretary to the General Manager, Great Indian Peninsula Railway, Bombay.
- John Mylrea Allen, Senior Master, Prince of Wales' Royal Indian Military College, Dehra Dun.
- Gerald Alfred Anderson, Deputy Director-General of Police, Criminal Investigation Department, His Exalted Highness the Nizam's Government, Hyderabad (Deccan).
- Edward Wallace Bouchier, Indian Civil Service, Deputy Provincial Motor Transport Controller and Secretary, Central Road Traffic Board, Madras.
- Lieutenant-Colonel Sydney John Pelham Cambridge, VD, Divisional Superintendent and Officer Commanding, Headquarters Administrative Group, East Indian Railway Defence of India Units, I.E, Howrah.
- Lieutenant-Colonel Conrad Reginald Cooke, ACGI, AMIEE, Director, Line Construction, Posts & Telegraphs, New Delhi.
- Charles Anthony Crawford, Regional Controller of Railway Priorities, Calcutta West.
- Leonard Gregory D'Silva, MBE, Director of Public Instruction (Officiating), Central Provinces & Berar.
- Nasir Ahmad Faruqui, Indian Civil Services, Collector of Bombay & Bombay Suburban District.
- Pilajirao Vithalrao Gaekwar, Accountant-General, Baroda.
- William Francis Alfred Hamilton, MBE, District Superintendent of Police, Madras.
- James Snelson Hardman, Indian Civil Service, District Magistrate, Patna, Bihar.
- Reginald Arthur Proctor Hare, Indian Police, Deputy Inspector-General of Police, Eastern Range, Bhagalpur, Bihar.
- Captain John Baron Howes, MBE, Indian Political Service, Under Secretary to the Government of India in the External Affairs Department, and lately His Majesty's Consul, Bushire.
- Harry Lewis Humphreys, Honorary Secretary, British War Savings Movement, Calcutta.
- Charles Murray Ker, MBE, Indian Civil Service, Magistrate and Collector, Cawnpore, United Provinces.
- John Brian Langford, Indian Civil Service, Deputy Secretary to the Government of India in the Department of Supply.
- John Lister Llewellyn, Indian Civil Services, Magistrate and Collector, 24-Parganas, Bengal.
- William Milles Martin, Manager, Wolverhampton Works Co. Ltd., Bombay.
- Bhola Nath Mullik, Indian Police, Deputy Director of Civil Defence and Deputy Secretary to the Government of Orissa, Home (A.R.P.) Department.
- Allister Patterson, Chief Engineer and Manager, Bombay Suburban Electric Supply Ltd., Bandra, Bombay.
- Lieutenant-Colonel Wilmot Reginald Bloomfield Peel, Military Secretary to His Excellency the Governor of Bengal.
- Geoffrey Bernard Sandeman Prance, Indian Police, Superintendent, Additional Police, Nowshera, North-West Frontier Province.
- Balwant Singh Puri, Indian Service of Engineers, Superintending Engineer, Central Public Works Department, Government of India.
- Joseph Vincent Quinlan, General Manager, Canteen Stores Department, Bombay.
- Jnanendranath Ray, PhD, DSc, FIC, Director of Drugs & Dressings, Medical Division, Department of Supply, Government of India.
- Percy Ridley, Deputy Port Officer (Pilotage), Mercantile Marine, Department of Commerce, Government of India.
- Frederick Jean Paul Richter, Honorary Secretary, Royal India Society, London.
- Mohan Lai Sawhney, MBE, Barrister-at-Law, Sargodha, Punjab.
- Herbert Schofield, Inspector of Metal & Steel, Ishapore.
- Rai Bahadur Nepal Chandra Sen, Officiating Secretary, Department of Agriculture, and Agricultural Development Commissioner, Bengal.
- John Burt Shearer, Indian Civil Service, Commissioner of Income-tax, Bombay.
- Herbert Macdouall Small, Government Solicitor, Madras.
- Charles William Spencer, Manager, Messrs. Gannon, Dunkerley & Co. Ltd., Civil Engineers & Contractors, Madras.
- Hugh Southern Stephenson, Indian Civil Service, Secretary to His Excellency the Governor of the United Provinces.
- Nivarty Sundaresan, Indian Audit & Accounts Service, Deputy Secretary to the Government of India in the Finance Department.
- Ronald Curtis Woodford, Director of Agriculture, Assam.
- Major Lovell William Wooldridge, Indian Political Service, Secretary to the Honourable the Resident for Rajputana.
- The Honourable Sayed Miran Muhammad Shah Zainulabdin Shah, JP, Speaker of the Sind Legislative Assembly, Sind.
- Maurice Nahum Gallant, Deputy Conservator of Forests, Burma Forest Service, Class I.
- Henry Noel Cochran Stevenson, Assistant Superintendent, Burma Frontier Service.
- Robert Beacroft Barker. For public services in Jamaica.
- William Harry Billington. For public services in Kenya.
- William Mill Caldwell, Assistant Commissioner of Inland Revenue, Fiji.
- Angus Robert Clark, Administrative Officer, Gambia.
- Douglas Pigram Cousin, Stores Superintendent, Kenya & Uganda Railways & Harbours Administration.
- Basil Berridge Davis. For public services in the Leeward Islands.
- Rupert Moultrie East, Colonial Education Service, Senior Education Officer, Nigeria.
- Alexander MacAndrew Gillespie, MB, ChB, FRCP, Colonial Medical Service, Senior Specialist, Gold Coast.
- Joseph Waterton Jackson. For public services in British Guiana.
- Tago Emrys James, Colonial Agricultural Service, Assistant Director of Agriculture, Nigeria.
- Gerald Donald Kennedy, Colonial Postal Service, Deputy Postmaster-General (Broadcasting), Palestine.
- Frank Leach, MC, Colonial Administrative Service, Officer of Class II, Ceylon Civil Service.
- Frederick John Lock, Colonial Customs Service, Comptroller of Customs and Collector of Income Tax, Nyasaland.
- Victoria Mackintosh. For social and philanthropic work in Gibraltar.
- The Venerable Archdeacon Henry Mathers. For services to education in Uganda.
- Geoffrey Noel Napier Noinn, Colonial Administrative Service, Assistant to the Lieutenant-Governor, Malta.
- Robert Pans Platt, Colonial Administrative Service, First Assistant Secretary, Aden.
- John Riley, Price Controller, Tanganyika Territory.
- Jung Bahadur Singh. For social welfare services in British Guiana.
- George William Sindle, MBE, Government Printer, Palestine.
- Helen Mary Twining, MRCS, LRCP, DPH. For medical services in Mauritius.
- Cuthbert Horner Walmsley, MC, MInstCE, Assistant Director of Public Works, Kenya.
- Bertram Osborne Wilkin, MB, ChB, Colonial Medical Service, Medical Officer (Health), Tanganyika Territory.
- John Hadley Wilkinson. For public services in Barbados.
- Claude Emile Wright, MBE. For public services in Sierra Leone.
