= 1944 Birthday Honours (New Zealand) =

Awards list for New Zealand

The 1944 King's Birthday Honours in New Zealand, celebrating the official birthday of King George VI, were appointments made by the King to various orders and honours. The awards were made in recognition of war service by New Zealanders and were announced on 8 June 1944. No civilian awards were made.

The recipients of honours are displayed here as they were styled before their new honour.

== Order of the British Empire ==
=== Commander (CBE) ===
Military division, additional

- Acting Air Commodore James Lloyd Findlay MC – Royal New Zealand Air Force.
- Brigadier Edward Talbot Rowllings – New Zealand Military Forces; of Christchurch.
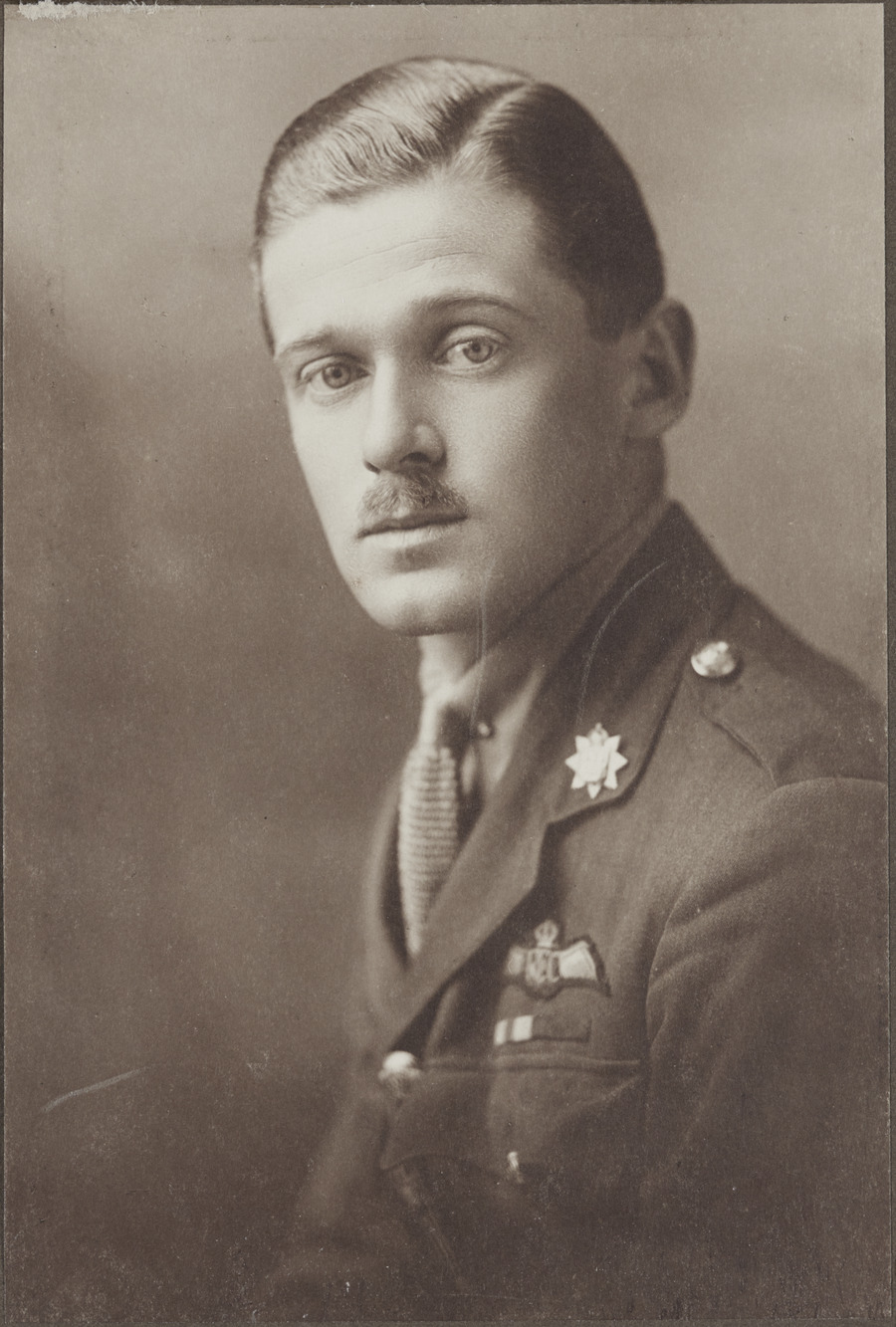
James Findlay

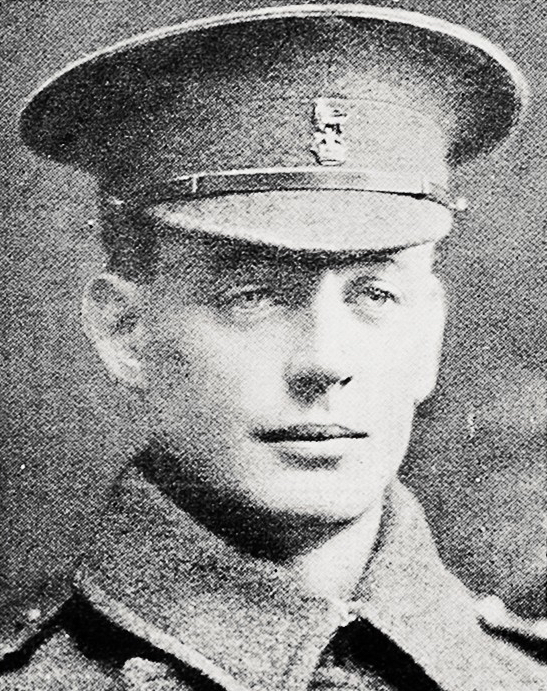
Edward Rowllings

=== Officer (OBE) ===
Military division, additional

- Lieutenant-Colonel Alfred Henry William Evenden – New Zealand Artillery (Territorial Force); of Christchurch.
- Chief Commander Vida Eliza Jowett – New Zealand Women's Auxiliary Army Corps; of Wellington.
- Major (temporary Lieutenant-Colonel) James Edward Fitzgerald Vogel – New Zealand Military Forces; of Lower Hutt.
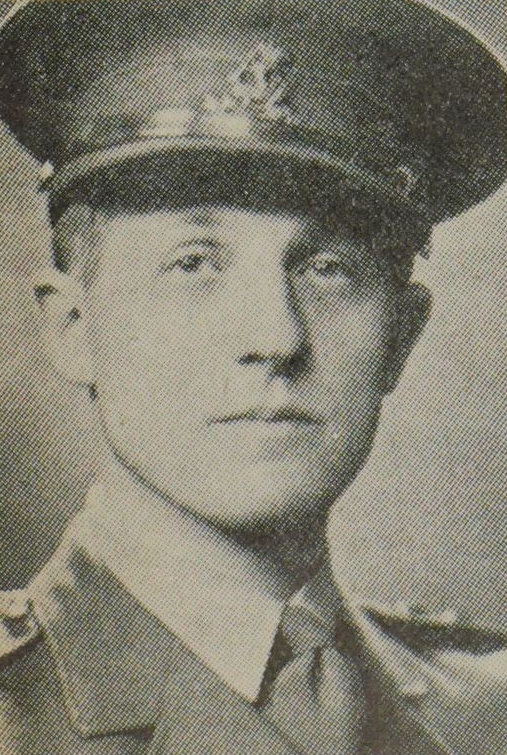
James Vogel

=== Member (MBE) ===
Military division, additional

- Flight Lieutenant James Bruce Dickey – Royal New Zealand Air Force; of Auckland.
- Acting Flight Lieutenant William John Fyfe – Royal New Zealand Air Force; of Cambridge.
- Frederick Gardner – temporary gunner, Royal New Zealand Navy; of Auckland.
- Captain and Quartermaster William Charles Hastings – New Zealand Army Ordnance Corps; of Burnham.
- Captain Reginald George Hayward – New Zealand Military Forces; of Lower Hutt.
- Captain Ronald Kennedy – New Zealand Military Forces; of Havelock North.
- Flying Officer John Padraic Weippert Pollard – Royal New Zealand Air Force; of Christchurch.
- Second Lieutenant Frederick Douglas Sheppard – New Zealand Dental Corps; of Wellington.
- Captain Alfred John Steele – New Zealand Military Forces.
- Second Lieutenant Leonard Roy Taylor – New Zealand Military Forces, attached Fiji Labour Corps; of Auckland.
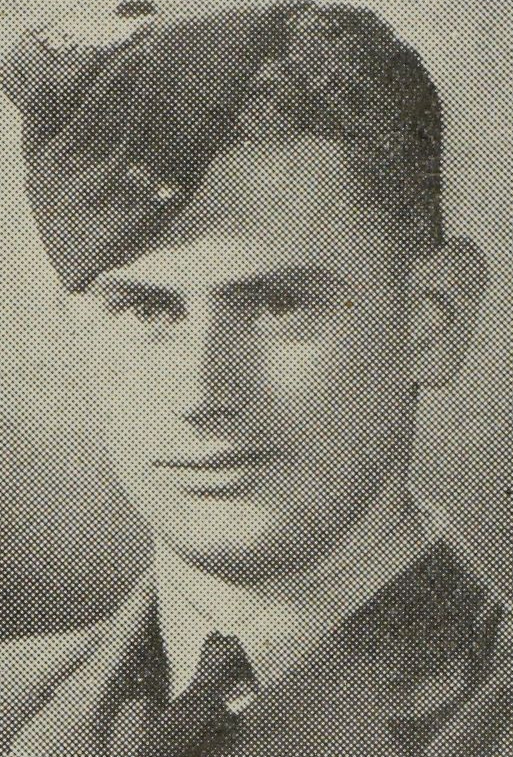
John Pollard

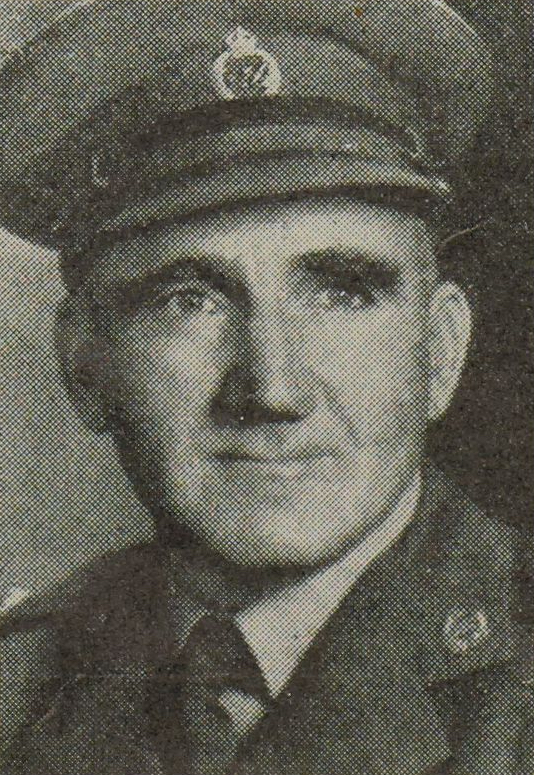
Leonard Roy Taylor

== British Empire Medal (BEM) ==
Military division

- Sergeant Arthur Bernard Goodwillie – New Zealand Military Forces; of Shannon.
- Master-at-Arms Thomas William Hughes – Royal New Zealand Navy; of Christchurch.
- Temporary Sergeant Leo Patrick Murphy – New Zealand Military Forces; of Auckland.
- Staff Sergeant Gordon Albert Roper – New Zealand Military Forces; of New Plymouth.
- Staff Sergeant Maurice Petrie Shaw – New Zealand Military Forces; of Auckland.

== Royal Red Cross ==
=== Member (RRC) ===
- Edith Mary Lewis – matron, New Zealand Army Nursing Service; of Wellington.

=== Associate (ARRC) ===
- Joyce Trevelyn Sexton – charge sister, New Zealand Army Nursing Service; of Auckland.

== Distinguished Service Cross (DSC) ==
- Temporary Lieutenant Maurice Leigh Newman – Royal New Zealand Naval Volunteer Reserve; of Christchurch.

== Air Force Cross (AFC) ==
- Flying Officer Thomas Alexander – Royal New Zealand Air Force; of Auckland.
- Acting Wing Commander Arthur Candlish Allen – Royal New Zealand Air Force; of Morrinsville.
- Squadron Leader Ernest William Barnett – Royal New Zealand Air Force; of Halcombe.
- Acting Squadron Leader Hayden Hugh James Miller – Royal Air Force; of Morrinsville.
- Flight Lieutenant William Bernard Pettet – Royal New Zealand Air Force; of Dunedin.
- Flight Lieutenant Allan John Price – Royal New Zealand Air Force; of Auckland.
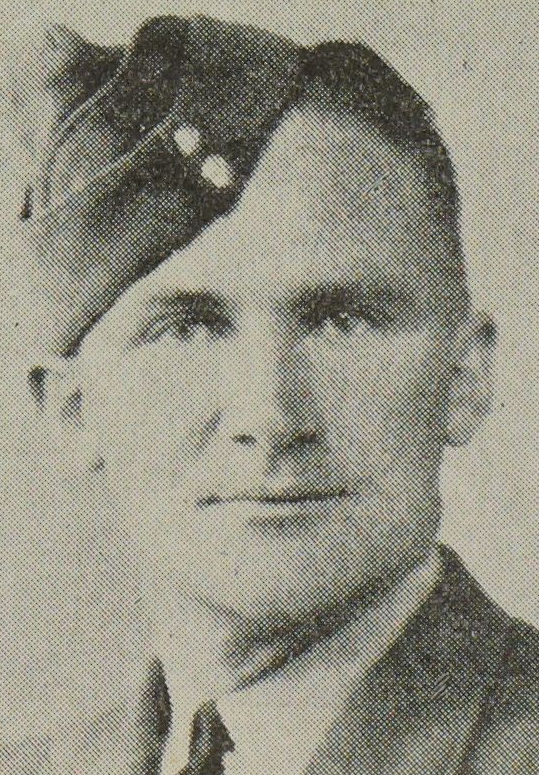
Thomas Alexander

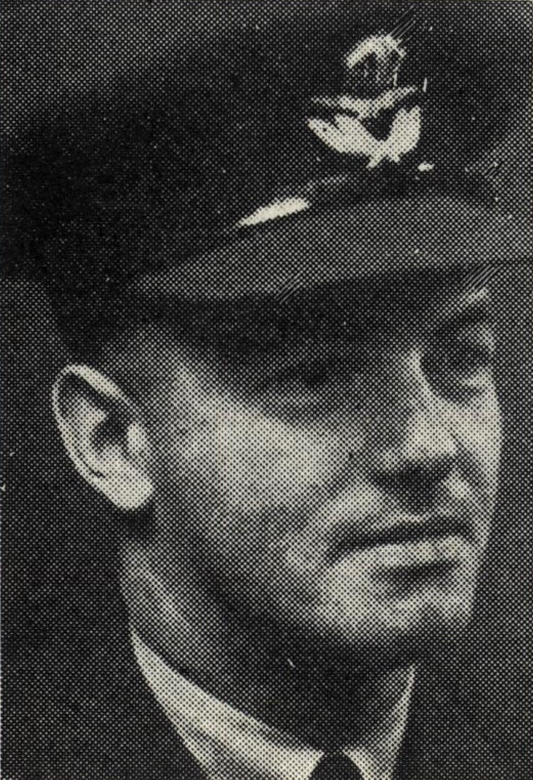
Hugh Miller

== King's Commendation for Valuable Service in the Air ==
- Flying Officer Ivor John McLachlan – Royal New Zealand Air Force; of Wellington.

== Mention in despatches ==
- Flying Officer Graham Arthur Bice – Royal New Zealand Air Force; of Auckland.
- Acting Squadron Leader Roy Oldfield Calvert DFC – Royal New Zealand Air Force; of Cambridge.
- Flight Lieutenant Arnold George Christensen – Royal New Zealand Air Force; of Hastings. (Note: Deceased)
- Flight Lieutenant Gordon Andrew Delves – Royal New Zealand Air Force.
- Flying Officer Roy Robert George Fisher – Royal New Zealand Air Force; of Cambridge.
- Flying Officer Francis Charles Fox – Royal New Zealand Air Force; of Napier.
- Flight Sergeant Neville Douglas Freeman – Royal New Zealand Air Force; of Christchurch.
- Acting Squadron Leader Wilfred Ronald Gellatly – Royal New Zealand Air Force; of Auckland.
- Acting Squadron Leader Brian Montgomery Gilmour DFC – Royal New Zealand Air Force; of Auckland.
- Flying Officer Ronald Matherson Grant – Royal New Zealand Air Force; of Wellington.
- Acting Squadron Leader Ian Hugh Hanlon – Royal New Zealand Air Force; of Wellington.
- Flying Officer William Charles Kingston Hender – Royal New Zealand Air Force; of Auckland.
- Flying Officer Harold Dennis Holtom – Royal New Zealand Air Force; of Paekākāriki.
- Acting Flight Lieutenant Frank Colwyn Jones – Royal New Zealand Air Force; of Auckland.
- Flight Sergeant Douglas Evan McKenzie – Royal New Zealand Air Force; of Masterton.
- Acting Flight Lieutenant Ivan George Edward McPhail – Royal New Zealand Air Force; of Dunedin.
- Acting Flight Lieutenant Leighton John Montgomerie – Royal New Zealand Air Force; of New Plymouth.
- Pilot Officer Walter Frank Morice – Royal New Zealand Air Force; of Wairoa.
- Flight Sergeant David Keith Mulligan – Royal New Zealand Air Force.
- Flying Officer James McLean Pearson – Royal New Zealand Air Force; of Greymouth.
- Flying Officer Porokoru Patapu Pohe – Royal New Zealand Air Force; of Taihape.
- Flying Officer Albert Prenter – Royal New Zealand Air Force; of Auckland.
- Sergeant Sydney John Salt – Royal New Zealand Air Force; of Belfast.
- Acting Squadron Leader Cyril Keith Silcock DFC – Royal New Zealand Air Force; of Nelson.
- Acting Flight Lieutenant Allan Henderson Smith – Royal New Zealand Air Force; of Auckland.
- Flight Sergeant Albert Henry Sowerby – Royal New Zealand Air Force; of Johnsonville.
- Acting Flight Lieutenant David Cameron Stewart – Royal New Zealand Air Force; of Dunedin.
- Flying Officer Donald Winter Thomson DFC – Royal New Zealand Air Force; of Aria.
- Acting Wing Commander Richard Webb DFC – Royal New Zealand Air Force; of Gisborne.
- Pilot Officer Leslie Samuel McQueen White – Royal New Zealand Air Force; of Gore.
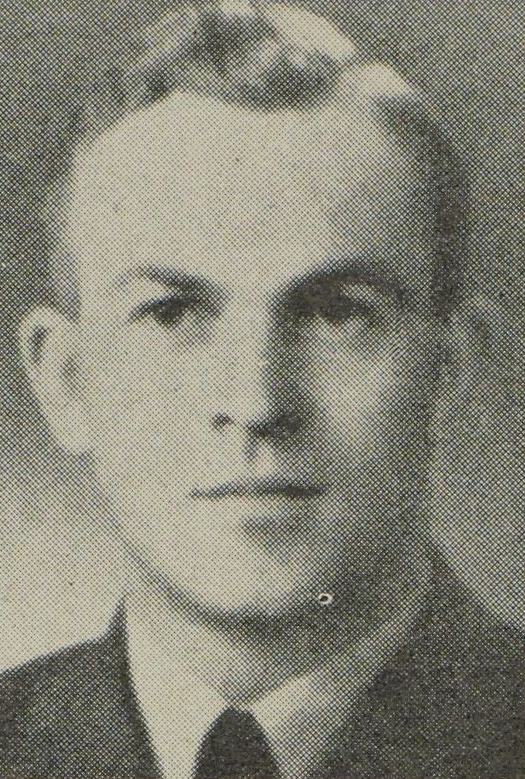
Roy Calvert

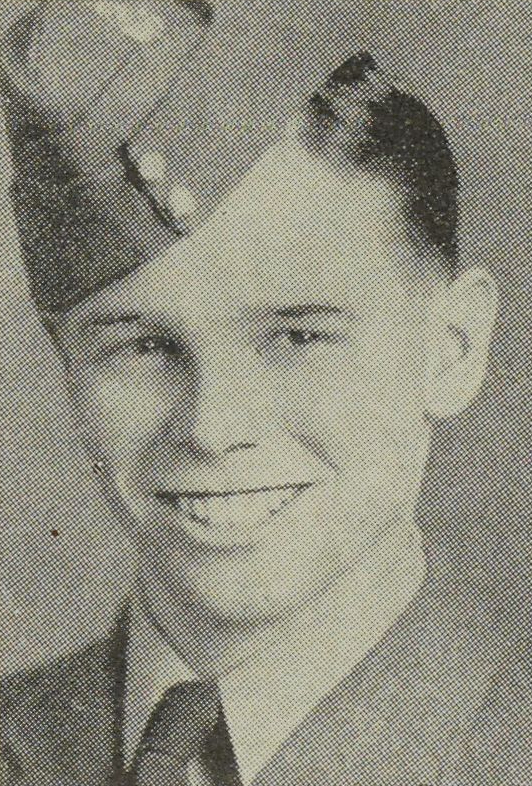
Arnold Christensen

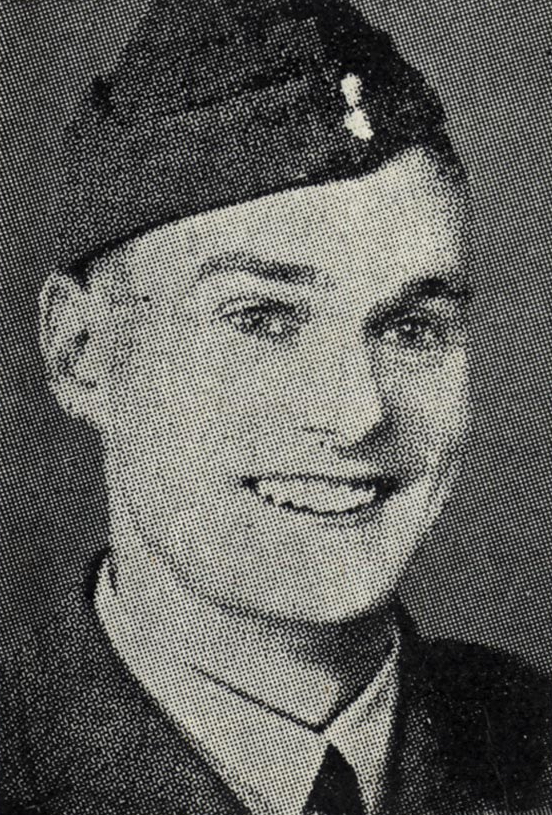
Brian Gilmour

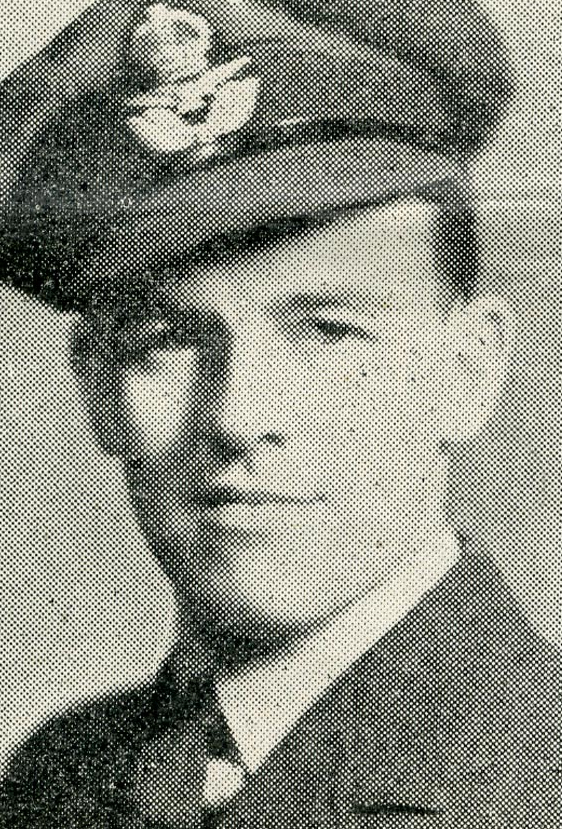
Ronald Grant

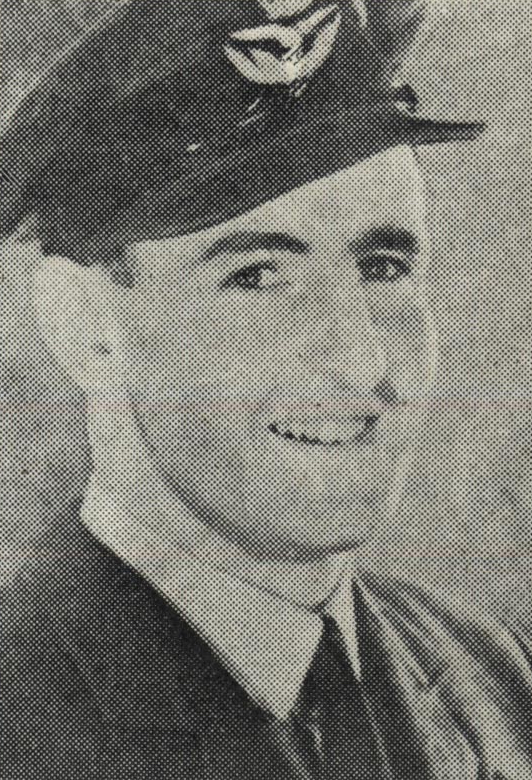
Leighton Montgomerie

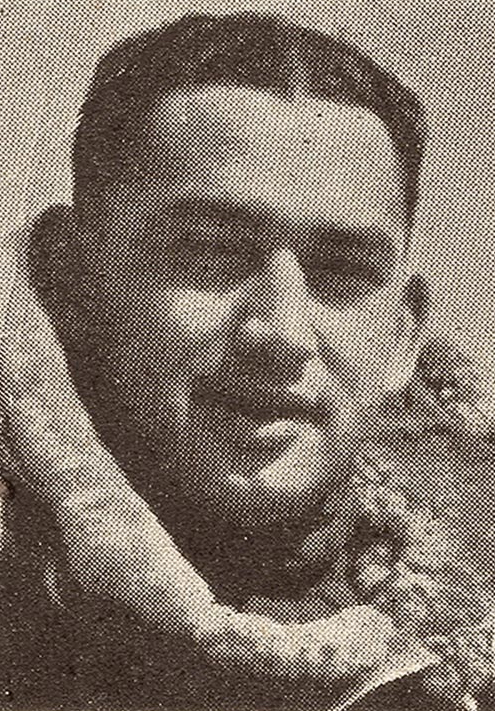
John Pohe

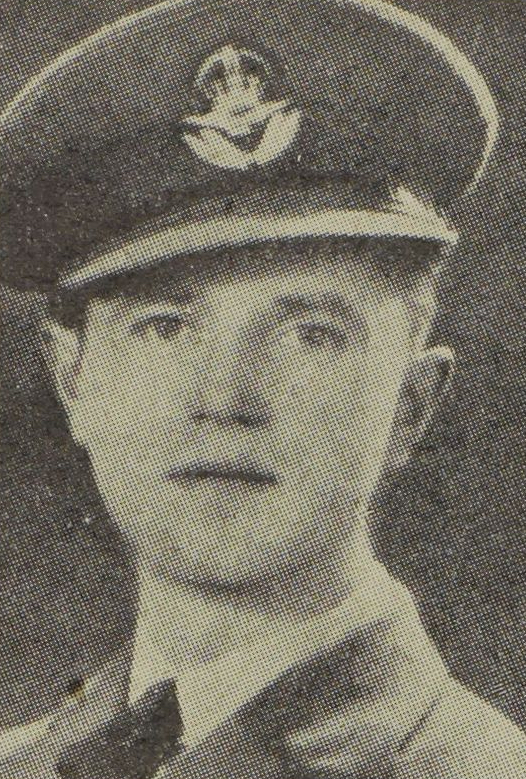
Keith Silcock

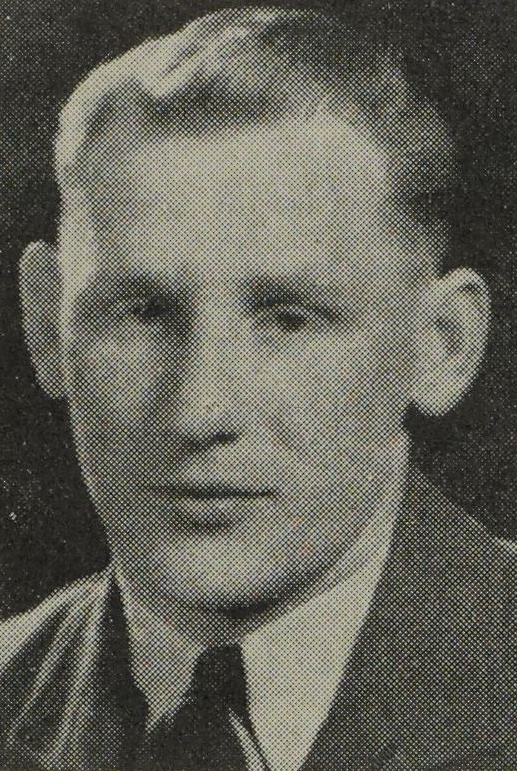
David Stewart

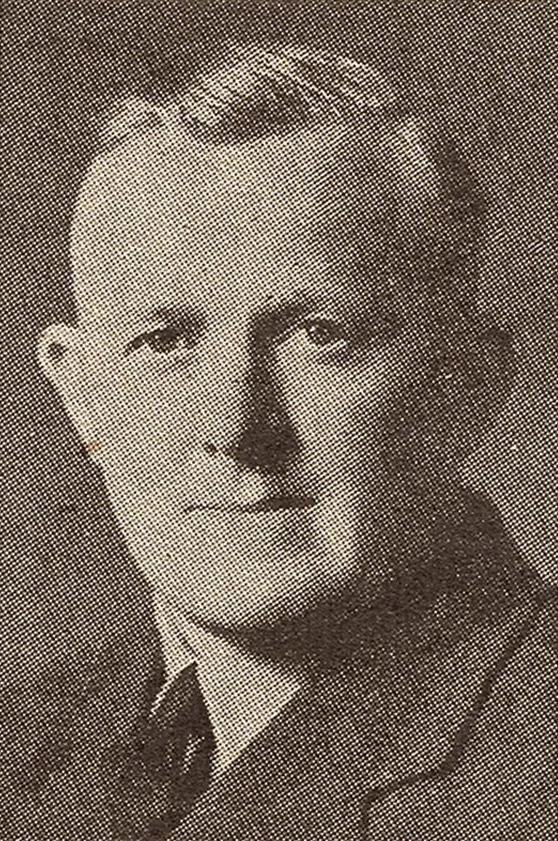
Donald Thomson
