= Murray Gardner =

Murray Gardner may refer to:

- Murray Gardner (skier)
- Murray Gardner (cricketer)
