= Vincent Henry Ludovici Anthonisz =

Ceylonese physician

Colonel Dr Vincent Henry Ludovici Anthonisz, OBE, ED (19 March 1894 – 9 June 1973) was a Ceylonese physician. He was the officer in charge of the Colombo General Hospital, Commandant, Ceylon Medical Corps and Honorary Surgeon to the Governor of Ceylon.

Anthonisz gained his Licentiate in Medicine and Surgery (LMS) from the Ceylon Medical College and joined the Ceylon Medical Service. He took further medical studies in Edinburgh and Glasgow, gaining his LRCP&S (Edinburgh) and LRFP&S (Glasgow). He went on to head the Colombo General Hospital. Having joined the Ceylon Medical Corps as a captain, he served as its Commandant from 1939 to 1946 during World War II and gained the rank of colonel. He was appointed an Officer of the Order of the British Empire (OBE) (military division) in the 1944 Birthday Honours and awarded the Efficiency Decoration.

He married Mary Caroline Trehernff de Sarara, daughter of James Steward de Sarara of the Ceylon Civil Service in 1921. They had three children.
