= Edith Rudd =

New Zealand nurse (1882–1967)

Edith Mary Rudd
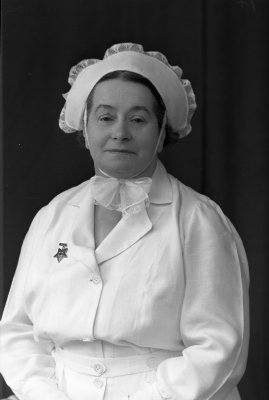
- Matron Edith Mary Rudd of the Wairau Hospital, Marlborough
- Born: 14 February 1882; Northampton, England
- Died: 7 May 1967 (aged 85); Blenheim, New Zealand
- Occupation: Matron Nurse

Edith Mary Rudd RRC (née Lewis; 14 February 1882 – 7 May 1967) was a New Zealand civilian and military nurse. She served in both World War I and World War II, and received the Florence Nightingale Medal from the Red Cross in 1961.

== Early life ==
Rudd was born in Northampton, England, the daughter of George Llewellyn Lewis and Mary Hunter née Littlejohn. She trained as a nurse at Whanganui Hospital in the North Island of New Zealand.

== Career ==
Rudd worked as a nurse at Rostrevor Hospital in Gisborne, in the North Island of New Zealand, until 1915, when she enlisted with the New Zealand Army Nursing Service. In December that year she sailed from Wellington on the ship SS Marama. She served in Egypt until 1918, nursing soldiers injured on the Western Front. On returning to New Zealand, Rudd continued nursing and from 1921 to 1941 she was Matron of Wairau Hospital in Blenheim. She also became involved with the New Zealand Red Cross, joining the Marlborough branch in 1925.

Rudd served as a nurse again in World War II, as Matron of the New Zealand Hospital Ship Maunganui from 1941 to 1945. Rudd and the Maunganui sailed from Wellington to Suez in April 1941 with a group of 20 New Zealand nurses. She became known as the "Momma of the Black Dressing Gown" as she wore a black silk dressing gown to make her night rounds during blackout conditions on board the ship. By the end of Rudd's service, in 1945, the ship had carried more than 5,600 patients. Rudd spent some time in 1945 and 1946 nursing at Trentham Military Hospital in Wellington on her return to New Zealand.

In 1952, Rudd became president of the Marlborough branch of the Red Cross. In 1963, she published her memoirs, titled Joy in the Caring.

=== Honours ===
In the 1944 King's Birthday Honours, Rudd received the highest military nursing award, the Royal Red Cross (First Class). In 1953, she received the Queen Elizabeth II Coronation Medal. In 1961, she was presented with the Florence Nightingale Medal by the Red Cross.

In 2013, Rudd's Florence Nightingale Medal was loaned to the Marlborough RSA for display in its rooms.

== Personal life ==
In 1927, Rudd was engaged to a Mr Nees, chairman of Wairau Hospital. Rudd married William George Rudd in 1946.

Edith Rudd died in Blenheim on 7 February 1967 and is buried at Omaka Cemetery.
