= New Zealand Forces Club =

The New Zealand Forces Club was a series of leave centres instigated for the benefit of the Second New Zealand Expeditionary Force in Egypt, Britain and Italy during World War II. General Bernard Freyberg had a deep concern for the wellbeing of his men. He saw the New Zealand Forces Club in Cairo as a place where other ranks especially could go and feel normal in what was an extraordinarily abnormal situation. General Freyberg was always anxious to have good leave centres for his men, maintaining, ‘You can't treat a man like a butler and expect him to fight like a gladiator’. From New Zealand patriotic funded every possible amenity and the best of equipment was provided for these clubs. They provided variety and a pleasant break from the mud and the cold. At the conclusion of the war, General Freyberg stated that the "greatest individual factor in keeping the NZ Division a unified force lay in the fact that we had ‘all ranks’ clubs, where we all met under the same roof—officers, sisters, VADs, and other ranks".

== Locations ==
=== Cairo ===
Located at 33, Sharia Malika Farida (now Abd El-Khalik Tharwat), Cairo, Egypt (corner of Emad El-Deen). Opened 5 February 1941. The New Zealand Club was a recognised meeting place for all ranks when in Cairo and was reputedly the best Service club in the city. The 13-storey building had previously been an old Italian club. It came under the direction of Lady Freyberg, wife of the Commander of the New Zealand Army in the Middle East. The club was made up of uniformed girl volunteers from New Zealand known as the Tuis. It was open Friday, Saturday: 7.30 a.m.-11 p.m., and Sunday, Thursday: 7.30 a.m.-10 p.m. The Club was in the heart of Cairo and provided: dining rooms for officers, N.C.O.'s and men, Hostelries for officers and men (Charge P.T. 10 for bed, soap, towel and bath); A canteen with New Zealand specialities, beer and a bar; reading, writing and games rooms; Officers' bar, hot and cold showers; a Padre in attendance for two hours in the evening; a Nurses' quarters, and a Barber's shop. The Hosteiry office was open all night. The Club in Cairo provided a much-appreciated centre for those on leave. Comfortable lounges where one could relax and drink tea in comparative coolness, or eat ice-cream and fruit salad, provided a welcome haven from the desert environs. The club was particularly appreciated by the nurses; the club was open to all nursing sisters of the Allied forces and was much used by sisters from other countries. Many interesting people were met and lasting friendships made there. On the ground floor of the building was the Pall Mall Photo Studio where service personnel had portrait photographs taken to send to family back home.

=== Bari ===
Riunione Adriatica di Sicurta (insurance company) building, Corso Cavour 83, 70121 Bari BA, Italy. It was a relatively new building located opposite Teatro Petruzzelli and included a small restaurant. The building continues today as the central Bari branch of the same insurance company now known as Allianz RAS.

=== Rome ===
Albergo Quirinale, Via Nazionale 7, 00184, Rome, Italy. One of Romes finest hotels, the Quirinale, was transformed into a very popular New Zealand Forces Club. Conditions were luxurious, and the city had boundless sources of interest. Leave to Rome was arranged as liberally as possible; New Zealanders on leave were well catered for and the facilities enjoyed became the envy of the soldiers of many nations. Tours of the City were among the many amenities provided free of cost in divisional transport with experienced guides. The Club also supported lectures and discussions for the NZ Forces Chaplains. Until the close of the campaign the sumptuous hotel was to remain the doyen of the several outstanding leave centres arranged for New Zealand troops in Italy. Initially the New Zealanders had been allotted the Excelsior Hotel as a Club but when they arrived they found mounted US guards who told them to "buzz off" and who then occupied the hotel themselves for a Club. This strengthened General Freyberg's resolve when it came to arrangements for a NZ Forces Club in Venice. The ultimate establishment used as the NZ Forces Club continues today as a modern hotel, Hotel Quirinale.

=== Florence ===
Grand Hotel Baglioni, Piazza Unità Italiana 6, Florence, Italy. Operated August 1944 - 1945. Florence suffered greater damage from the conflict in comparison to Rome. In many of the churches priceless paintings and sculpture of the Renaissance era had been either bricked up, sandbagged, or removed, and the famous picture galleries were not open for inspection, so many of their exhibits having been deposited elsewhere for safer keeping. Nevertheless, Florence had many attractions and was notable for the number of people able to speak good English. The establishment continues today as a modern hotel, Grand Hotel Baglioni.

=== Venice ===
Albergo Danieli, Riva Degli Schiavoni, 4196 Castello, Venice 30122, Italy. Opened 29 April 1945. After initial problems securing a club in Rome, B Company of 22 Battalion, was tasked by General Freyberg to occupy and hold at all costs the world-famous Albergo Danieli in Venice for a New Zealand Forces Club. The General, who had stayed at this hotel before the war, loved Venice. At the back of his mind, as the New Zealanders drove on past the Senio River, was the determination that his men would see Venice, as he had done, from the very best hotel. The establishment continues today as a modern hotel, Hotel Danieli.

=== Charing Cross, London ===
Charing Cross Library, 4-6 Charing Cross Road, Leicester Square, London WC2H 0BJ, United Kingdom. Opened 9 Aug 1940.

=== Fernleaf Club, London ===
No 3 Lowndes Square, Belgravia, London SW1X, United Kingdom. Opened by the High Commissioner for New Zealand, Mr W. J. Jordan c. March 1945. It was a residential centre for the rehabilitation of troops, staffed by the New Zealand Women's Army Auxiliary Corps.

== The Tuis ==
The Women's Auxiliary Army Corps, known as Tuis, undertook the work of establishing the NZ Forces Clubs, first in Egypt and later in Italy. The women travelled to Cairo in 1941 in response to a request from the Second New Zealand Expeditionary Force Commander, Bernard Freyberg, to the New Zealand Government to send thirty 'girls' to bring a touch of home and to help staff the new Forces Club there. When they arrived in Cairo, they were placed in the care of Freyberg's elegant upper class English wife, Barbara. Since 'My General' - as she called him - had his kiwis, she named the group 'The Tuis'.

Viewing the New Zealand Forces Club in Cairo as “terribly drab”, General Freyberg requested from the New Zealand government 30 young New Zealand women to staff the club lounge and to “give it a touch of home.” This group trail blazed because, apart from the nursing service, this was the first time that women had served in the New Zealand Army. There was no army manual on what their role would be and when the women left New Zealand they had no idea what they would be doing. As it turned out, the group, under the protective leadership of Freyberg’s wife, Barbara, played a welfare role. This role was formally recognised in 1942 with the constitution of the WAAC (Women’s Auxiliary Army Corps) Welfare Division.

In Italy the status of the members of the WAAC was changed so that within 2 NZEF they had all the privileges of an officer as regards travelling, accommodation, and the use of clubs. The change was made purely to avoid embarrassment to the women, and they were gratified. The women worked long hours preparing and serving food, visiting hospitals, shopping, helping men select gifts for families at home, dancing with them at places like the YMCA, and providing sympathetic listening. In Egypt they were called on to provide concerts for the soldiers, especially at times when the New Zealand Concert Party was not available. Later in London the Tuis helped rehabilitate returning POWs.
