= James Vogel =

Lieutenant-Colonel James Vogel OBE
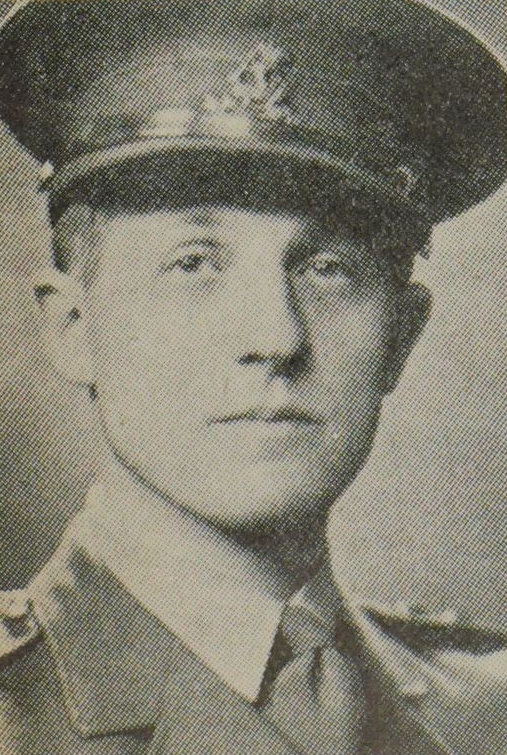
- Vogel in 1944
- Born: James Edward Fitzgerald Vogel; 24 June 1907
- Died: 1971 (aged 63–64)
- Relatives: Julius Vogel (grandfather)
- Military career
- Allegiance: United Kingdom
- Branch: British Army
- Rank: Lieutenant-Colonel
- Conflicts: Second World War
- Awards: Officer of the Order of the British Empire

Lieutenant-Colonel James Edward Fitzgerald Vogel, OBE (24 June 1907 – 1971) was a New Zealand Military Forces officer who served as acting General Officer Commanding 1st Armoured Division in Italy during the Second World War.

== Military career ==
Vogel was the grandson of Sir Julius Vogel. He was commissioned into the New Zealand Military Forces and was assigned to the 19th Battalion in 1939 at the start of the Second World War. His battalion saw action in Greece and North Africa before advancing into Italy. He was appointed an Officer of the Order of the British Empire in the 1944 Birthday Honours and briefly served as acting General Officer Commanding 1st Armoured Division from 24 November 1944 until the division was disbanded in Italy on 11 January 1945.

== Family ==
Vogel married Jocelyn Riddiford in 1932. The family presented their home, Vogel House, to the nation of New Zealand for use as the official residence of the Prime Minister in 1965.
