= George Henry Morley =

Air Vice-Marshal George Henry Morley CB CBE FRCS (22 February 1907- 26 May 1971) was a British military doctor, an expert on plastic surgery, particularly the treatment of burns, and senior RAF officer.
