= John Wall, Baron Wall =

John Edward Wall, Baron Wall, OBE (15 February 1913 – 29 December 1980) was a British businessman and life peer.

== Biography ==
The son of Harry Arthur Fitzgerald Wall and Marie Louise Wall, John Wall was educated at Wandsworth School and the London School of Economics, where he graduated BCom in 1933 and was elected honorary fellow in 1970.

Wall was with O. T. Falk & Co. from 1933 to 1939, when he joined the Ministry of Food, where he remained until 1952, rising to the rank of Under-Secretary from 1948 to 1952. He then joined Unilever Ltd, becoming deputy head of the Finance Department from 1952 to 1956 and head of the organisation division from 1956 to 1958. Joining EMI in 1958, he was its managing director from 1960 to 1966.

He was deputy chairman of the Post Office Board from 1966 to 1968, chairman of International Computers (Holdings) Ltd and International Computers Ltd. from 1968 to 1972, of Burrup Mathieson (Holdings) Ltd. from 1973 to 1976, and a part-time member of the Sugar Board from 1964 to 1977. He was director of Laporte Industries (Holdings) Ltd from 1968 until his death, of The Exchange Telegraph Co. (Holdings) Ltd from 1972 to 1978, of Grundy (Teddington) Ltd from 1972 until his death, Chairman of Charterhouse Development Capital Ltd from 1976 to his death, and of Nurdin and Peacock from 1977 until death.

Wall was appointed an Officer of the Order of the British Empire in 1944, an Officer of the Order of Orange Nassau in 1947, and knighted in 1968. On 5 February 1976, he was created a life peer as Baron Wall, of Coombe in Greater London. His body was found in the Thames in 1980.

Wall married Gladys Evelyn, née Wright in 1939; they had two sons and one daughter.
