= John Dodds (engineer) =

Scottish electrical engineer

John Mathieson Dodds OBE (13 September 1905 – 15 October 1983) was a Scottish electrical engineer. He was educated at the University of Aberdeen and at the Technische Hochschule, Aachen, where he won a Dr Ing. in 1933.

Dodds worked in the Research Department of Metropolitan-Vickers Electrical Co. in Trafford Park, Manchester. While at Metropolitan-Vickers, Dodds developed high-power thermionic valves. These valves were used in the transmitter part of equipment for radar stations for defence (Chain Home system), thereby making a significant contribution to Britain's survival in World War II. He was appointed an Officer of the Order of the British Empire (OBE) in the 1944 Birthday Honours.
