= Women's Auxiliary Army Corps (New Zealand) =

Female auxiliary of the New Zealand Military Forces

Women's Auxiliary Army Corps Women's Royal Army Corps
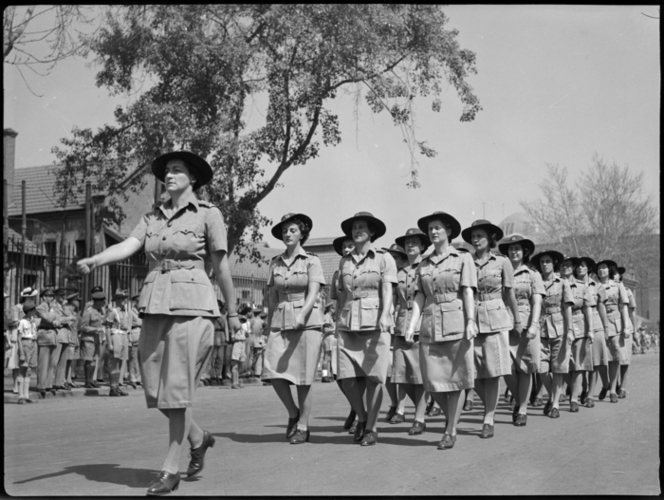
- Personnel of the Women's Army Auxiliary Corps marching through Cairo, Egypt, during an Empire Day parade, June 1943
- Active: 1942–1977
- Country: New Zealand
- Type: Army
- Size: Personnel: 4,589 (peak strength)
- Engagements: Second World War: North African campaign; Italian campaign; Pacific campaign; Home Front; Occupation of Japan

Commanders
- Notable commanders: Vida Jowett (1942–1947)

The Women's Auxiliary Army Corps was a female auxiliary of the New Zealand Military Forces. Raised during the Second World War under the command of Vida Jowett, most of its personnel served on the Home Front, with several manning coastal and anti-aircraft defences. Many WAACs were sent overseas to serve in Europe and the Middle East, mainly providing medical and welfare services to the troops of the 2nd New Zealand Expeditionary Force. At its peak, it had a strength of nearly 4,600 serving personnel. After the war, some WAACs served with Jayforce, providing welfare services for the New Zealand troops doing occupation duties in Japan.

In peacetime, WAAC personnel performed catering, clerical, medical, and signalling work. In 1948, it became a regular corps of the New Zealand Army and four years later became the New Zealand Women's Royal Army Corps, upon gaining approval to use the Royal designation. It was disbanded in 1977 when women were allowed to serve with the New Zealand Army alongside men.

== Formation ==
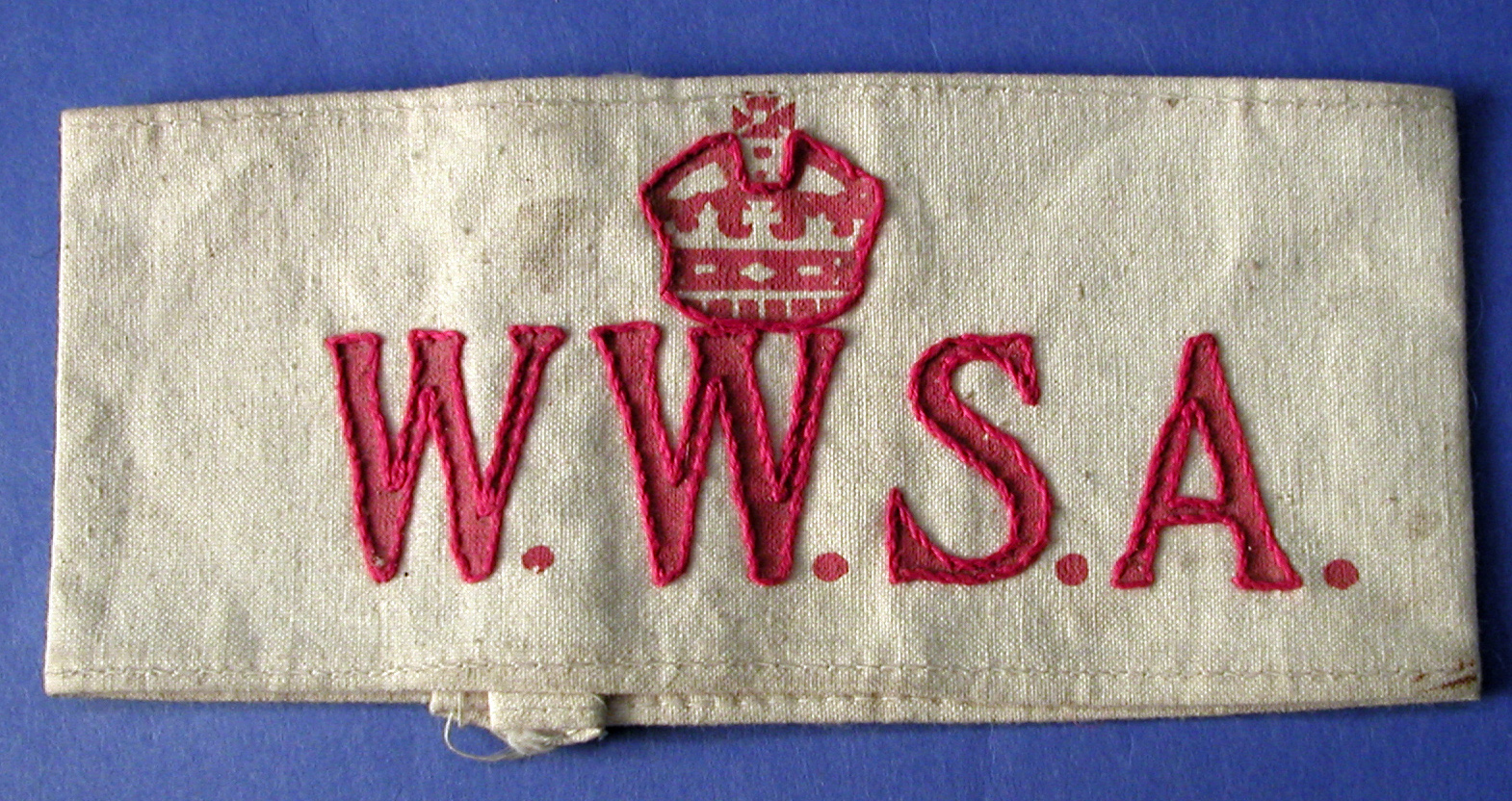
Women's War Service Auxiliary armband

Following the outbreak of the Second World War, it was some time before the potential contribution of women to the war effort was appreciated in New Zealand. It was not until late 1940 that a Women's War Service Auxiliary (WWSA) was formed with the task of co-ordinating the use of women in the war effort. This then led to the formation of female auxiliary services for the branches of the New Zealand Military Forces. This would free up men for active service overseas or for essential industries. The intention to form an auxiliary service for the Army was announced in February 1942 and the Women's Auxiliary Army Corps (WAAC) was officially formed in July, under the command of Vida Jowett. It was planned that the WAAC would have 10,000 personnel.

== Recruitment ==
The WWSA initially screened applicants for the WAAC. However, it ceased to be involved after a few months as there was increasing dissatisfaction with how recruitment was being handled. Instead, applications were made to the National Service Department, responsible for recruitment into the New Zealand Military Forces.

Applicants had to be aged between 18 and 50 to qualify for service on the Home Front and to serve abroad, they had to be between 23 and 40 years old. Some early recruits were civilian employees of the Army who were already performing administrative and catering duties at various facilities around New Zealand. In addition, WWSA volunteers serving in the canteens of the New Zealand Forces Club in Cairo, run for personnel of the 2nd New Zealand Expeditionary Force (2NZEF), became part of the WAAC. These volunteers, the first New Zealand women to serve overseas in aid of the war effort, were known as Tuis. The tui, a native bird of New Zealand, became the emblem of the WAAC.

WAAC personnel were required to serve for the duration of the war and then a 12-month period afterwards, unless discharged prior. From October 1942, following an amendment to the Defence Emergency Regulations 1941, they were subject to many of the laws and regulations that applied to male personnel of the New Zealand Military Forces, but also enjoyed some of the benefits as well.

== War service ==
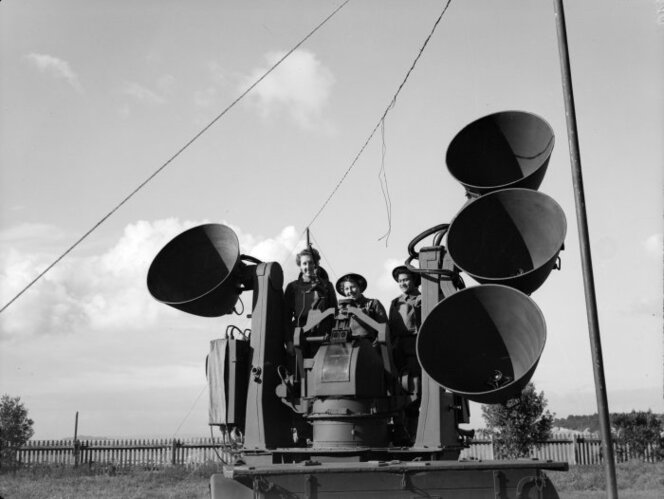
Three WAACs operating a sound detector somewhere in New Zealand

In New Zealand, WAACs fulfilled a variety of roles, many of which clerical or administrative in nature. Others operated communication equipment and heavy machinery. The success of the equivalent British organisation for women, the Auxiliary Territorial Service, in assuming coastal and anti-aircraft defence duties was noted, and the WAAC performed similar duties in New Zealand.

Over 900 WAACs served abroad with the 2NZEF, mainly in Egypt and, later in the war, Italy. Although their presence were largely appreciated for the morale of the personnel of the main contingent of the 2NZEF, the 2nd New Zealand Division, there were concerns that problems might arise if they were to marry. The WAAC had a nursing division, with over 200 personnel serving as voluntary aid detachments (VADs) across the 2NZEF hospitals in the Middle East; a welfare division, mainly employed in the New Zealand Forces Clubs in Cairo, and later a clerical division. Some WAACs served in clerical roles at the various medical facilities in Egypt, allowing the men previously doing this work to serve with field units. Other WAACs based in Egypt as part of the welfare division prepared parcels for New Zealanders interned in the prisoner of war camps in Europe and helped soldiers on leave shop for gifts for family back in New Zealand. In November 1943, once the 2nd New Zealand Division became involved in the Italian campaign, 15 WAACs were shifted to Bari to establish a New Zealand Forces Club there. As the campaign progressed, further clubs were established in Rome and Florence. Other WAACs were based in London, working in the Fernleaf club for New Zealand personnel there.

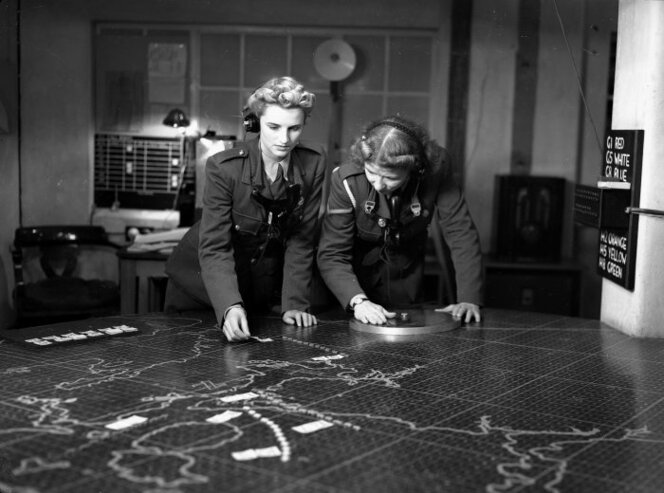
Two WAACs operating a plotting table

Around 200 WAACs also served in the Pacific, some working as clerks or in troop welfare stations in Tonga and New Caledonia. In July 1943, 80 WAACs joined the staff of No. 4 General Hospital, established at New Caledonia to treat the personnel of the 3rd New Zealand Division, as VADs, freeing up male orderlies for service with ambulance units in the field. Also in Tonga, a few WAACs worked for the British consul performing cipher duties. In Fiji, some WAAC personnel assisted the local government there in various ways.

By November 1942, 2,200 women had enlisted in the WAAC and their number increased to 4,589 in July the following year. This was the peak of the WAAC and from then its numbers declined, falling to 3,900 by April 1944 and 2,500 by the end of the war in 1945. From 1944, the longest-serving soldiers of the 2NZEF were returning to New Zealand on furlough or discharge. The WAACs who were married or engaged to those returning soldiers were released from service. In addition, recruitment to the WAAC was compromised by women increasingly being diverted into industries on the Home Front rather than joining the available auxiliary corps. The war in the Pacific was now more favourable and the perceived threat of Japanese invasion had receded; this also affected enlistment. At least ten WAACs died while on service during the Second World War.

== Post-war period ==
After the war, the number of serving WAACs declined, reaching 969 in March 1946. With the end of hostilities, WAACs ceased their involvement in defensive duties and instead they were engaged in clerical and medical work, as well as signalling and catering. In August 1947, some WAACs were sent to Japan as part of Jayforce. They helped provide welfare services to the New Zealand troops performing occupation duties there. The same year, the medical section of the WAAC became part of the New Zealand Army Nursing Section, and Jowett retired as commander. She remained involved in an honorary capacity for a further six years.

In 1948, the WAAC became a regular corps in the New Zealand Army and was renamed the New Zealand Women's Army Corps. In 1952, the WAAC gained approval from Queen Elizabeth II to use the Royal designation and was accordingly renamed New Zealand Women's Royal Army Corps (WRAC).

As with the corresponding naval and air force women's services, the WRAC was disbanded in 1977. This followed the introduction of the Human Rights Commission Act 1977, leading to a decision to do away with separate services for women in the New Zealand military. Women were now able to serve alongside men in the New Zealand Army.

== See also ==
- New Zealand Women's Auxiliary Air Force
- Women's Royal New Zealand Naval Service
