= Rita Buxton =

Australian community worker, activist, racehorse owner and philanthropist

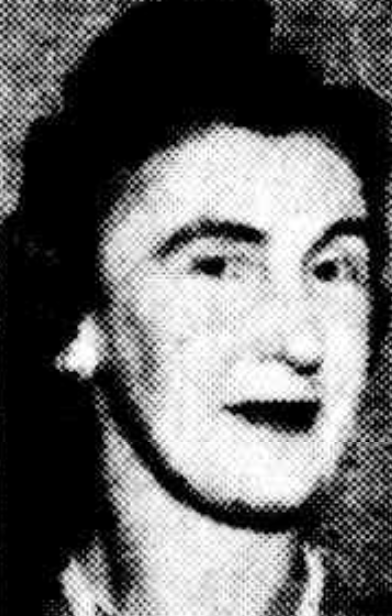
- Rita Mary Buxton, DBE (1896-1982)
- Born: Dame Rita Mary Buxton; 21 November 1896
- Died: 22 August 1982
- Occupation(s): Community worker, activist, racehorse owner and philanthropist

Dame Rita Mary Buxton, DBE (21 November 1896 – 22 August 1982) was an Australian community worker, activist, racehorse owner and philanthropist.

== Background and family ==
Born at South Yarra, Melbourne, the only child of Charles James Neunhoeffer (or Neunhoffer) and Emma Alice née O'Connor, she was educated at Sacré Coeur convent school, Glen Iris. Her father was a civil servant turned entrepreneur, becoming the proprietor of Canada Cycle & Motor Co. (Victoria) Pty Ltd, motorcar importers.

== Marriage ==
On the day after her 26th birthday (22 November 1922), at St Joseph's Catholic Church, Malvern she married Leonard Raymond Buxton (1896-1977).

== St Vincent's ==
In 1927 Rita Buxton joined the Toorak auxiliary of St Vincent's Hospital, Fitzroy. By 1936 she was president of the central executive of the hospital's auxiliaries. She organised voluntary help for St Vincent's in World War II, working in the laundry herself. In 1947 she became the first woman (apart from the mother rectress) on the hospital's advisory council. In 1958 she was named founding member of the council of St Vincent's School of Medical Research, for which she engaged in fund-raising and donated large sums of money of her own for fellowships.

== Racehorses ==
Rita Buxton owned several racehorses. One, High Syce, won the Caulfield Cup in 1929. St Razzle, another, was runner-up in 1949. The Victoria Golf Club instituted a cup in her name, awarded to the winner of an annual match-play tournament, in recognition of her contribution to the club as president (1937–49) of the associates.

== Honours ==
- OBE, 1944
- CBE, 1955
- DBE, 1969

== Affiliations ==
- Australian Red Cross Society (Victoria)
- Alexandra Club

== Last years ==
Following the death of her husband, Buxton retired from the bulk of her hospital work, although she remained a life councillor of St Vincent's and nominal president of the auxiliaries. Survived by her three daughters, she died on 22 August 1982, aged 85.

== Sources ==
- B. Egan, "Ways of a Hospital" (1993)
- The Age (Melbourne), 7 November 1934, page 13, 14 June 1969, page 15
- The Herald (Melbourne), 14 June 1969, page 2
- The Sun News-Pictorial (Melbourne), 1 October 1982, page 11
- The Advocate (Melbourne), 9 September 1982, page 4
