= Vida Jowett =

New Zealand military administrator

Vida Eliza Jowett OBE (née Berry; 8 February 1893 – 1 June 1982) was a New Zealand women's military administrator during the Second World War. After helping to create the civilian Women's War Service Auxiliary in 1940, she was appointed Chief Commander of the Women's Auxiliary Army Corps in 1942.

In the 1944 King's Birthday Honours, Jowett was appointed an Officer of the Order of the British Empire (Military Division). She retired from the WAAC in August 1947.
