= Murray Gardner (cricketer) =

South African cricketer and Royal Air Force officer

Murray Gardner DFC, OBE
Personal information
- Full name: Charles Murray Shand Gardner
- Born: 7 October 1913; Grahamstown, Cape Province, Union of South Africa
- Died: 2 July 2001 (aged 87); Overport, Durban, KwaZulu-Natal, South Africa
- Batting: Right-handed

Domestic team information
- Years: Team
- 1931–32 to 1934–35: Eastern Province
- 1936–37: Border

Career statistics
Competition	First-class
Matches	10
Runs scored	295
Batting average	14.75
100s/50s	0/1
Top score	51
Balls bowled	0
Wickets	–
Bowling average	–
5 wickets in innings	–
10 wickets in match	–
Best bowling	–
Catches/stumpings	2/0
- Source: Cricinfo, 20 December 2019

Charles Murray Shand Gardner (7 October 1913 – 2 July 2001) was a South African cricketer and Royal Air Force officer.

== Life and career ==
Murray Gardner was born in Grahamstown and educated there at St Andrew's College and Rhodes University. He played 10 matches of first-class cricket for Eastern Province and Border between 1931 and 1937. An opening batsman, his highest score was 51 for Eastern Province against Border in the Currie Cup in 1931–32.

He joined the Royal Air Force in 1940 and served throughout the war, ending as a lieutenant colonel. He was awarded the DFC in 1941 and appointed OBE in 1945 for services to the allied air forces.
