= Through Darkened Vales =

1911 film directed by D. W. Griffith

- Directed by: D. W. Griffith
- Written by: Stanner E. V. Taylor
- Starring: Blanche Sweet; Charles West
- Cinematography: G. W. Bitzer
- Distributed by: Biograph Company
- Release date: November 16, 1911
- Running time: 17 minutes
- Country: United States
- Language: Silent (English intertitles)

Through Darkened Vales is a 1911 American short silent melodramatic film directed by D. W. Griffith and starring Blanche Sweet and Charles West.

== Plot ==
Dave is rejected by Grace, who laughs at him. Her other suitor, Howard, enters and receives a much warmer reception. Dave leaves, dejected, and resumes his work as a bookkeeper.

Shortly after, Grace is blinded in an explosion. Howard does not have the money for her treatment, and quickly finds another girlfriend. Meanwhile, the strain of overwork also causes Dave to go blind. By chance, they both go to the same medical clinic at about the same time. Dave, hearing Grace in the other room, has her father summoned and offers him money for Grace's cure, leaving himself none for his own. Grace's father refuses at first, but Dave is adamant.

Grace is cured. When Howard comes calling, she assumes he paid for her treatment. However, her father quickly corrects her, and Howard sheepishly departs.

Grace has much to think about. When she spots Dave blindly wandering the street with a bunch of brooms on his shoulder which he is seeking to sell, she rushes to him and takes him inside her home.

== Cast ==
- Blanche Sweet as Grace
- Grace Henderson as Grace's Mother
- Charles West as Dave
- Joseph Graybill as Howard
- J. Jiquel Lanoe
- Dell Henderson
- Kate Toncray
- Charles Hill Mailes
- Fred Mace
- Jackie Sanders
- Kate Bruce
- William J. Butler
- William Bechtel
- Adolph Lestina
- W. Christy Cabanne
- Harry Hyde
- Edwin August

== Production ==
The film was shot in Fort Lee, New Jersey, as were many of Griffith's other Biograph shorts. The skies were foreboding and there were strong winds, a fitting setting for the scene where Dave has to find his way with a cane in the street.

== Reception ==
In the December 2, 1911, issue of The Movie Picture World, the reviewer wrote, "have difficulty finding anything to praise in this poor picture".

== See also ==
- D. W. Griffith filmography
- Blanche Sweet filmography
