= Robyn Munford =

New Zealand social work researcher

Robyn Munford ONZM
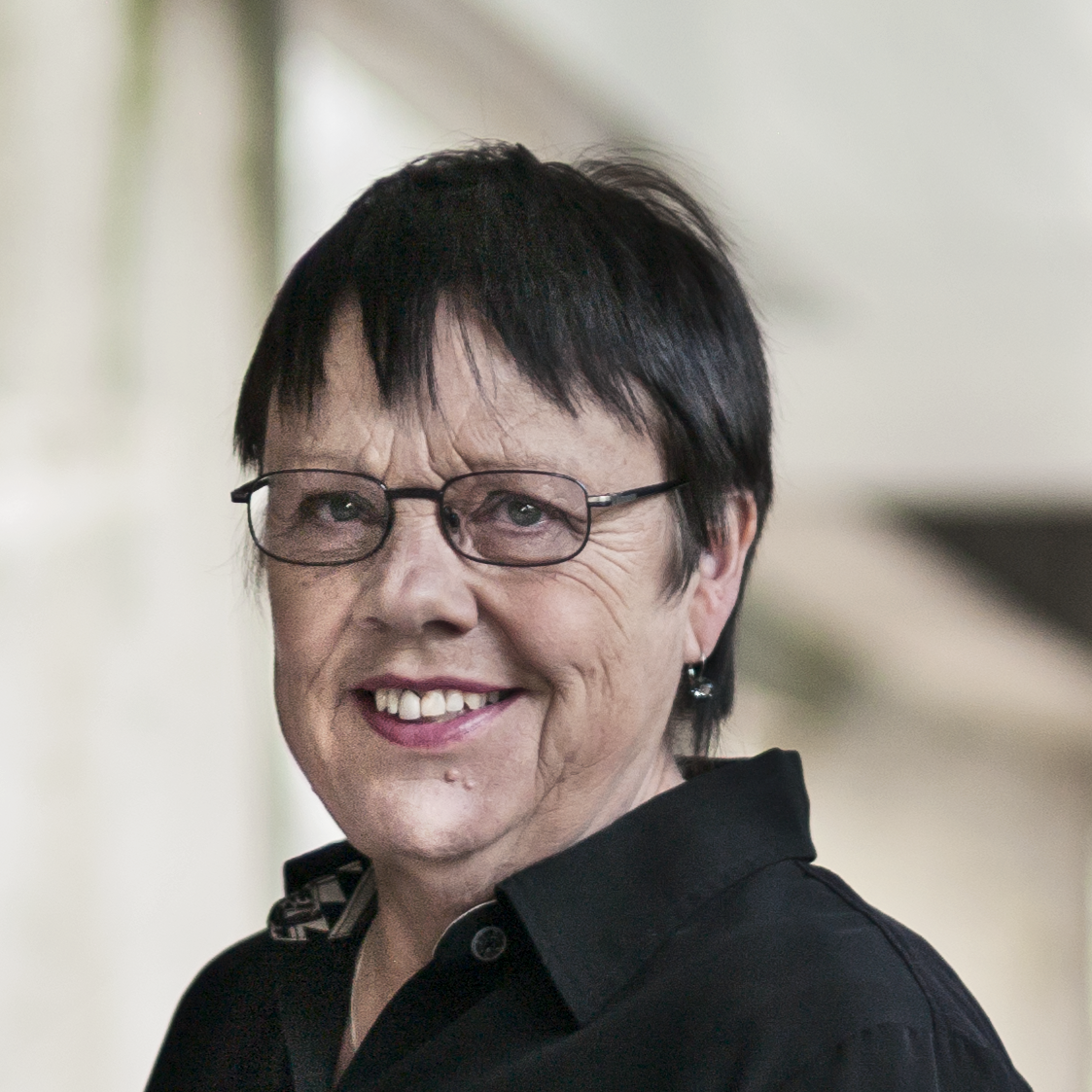
- Education: Massey University
- Scientific career
- Fields: Social work
- Workplaces: Massey University
- Thesis: The hidden costs of caring : women who care for people with intellectual disabilities (1989)

Robyn Eileen Munford ONZM is a New Zealand social work researcher, and professor in the School of Social Work at Massey University. Her research concerns community development, young people's pathway to adulthood, and disability studies.

== Academic career ==
Munford completed a Bachelor of Social Work at Massey University in 1978, and then Master of Social Work at the University of Calgary in 1983. Her 1989 PhD thesis at Massey University was titled The hidden costs of caring : women who care for people with intellectual disabilities. She joined the staff at Massey University in 1991, and rose to full professor. Munford is the co-editor of the journal Qualitative Social Work, and is an adjunct professor in disability studies at York University.

In the 2002 Queen's Birthday and Golden Jubilee Honours, Munford was appointed an Officer of the New Zealand Order of Merit, for services to social work education and policy. In 2006 she received a Massey University Research Medal for her supervision of postgraduates. She was a finalist in the Public Policy Category of the 2015 Women of Influence Award (New Zealand).

== Research ==
Munford has undertaken several recent research projects, including Pathways to Resilience (funded by MBIE), and the Long-term Successful Youth Transitions Study (LtSYT), with her Massey colleague Jackie Sanders. LtSYT examines the major transitions in the lives of high-risk young people between the ages of 13 and 17 – leaving school, higher education, employment, independence, and establishing an identity – and looks at the pathways that led to resilience and how those could be supported. This 10-year longitudinal study is due to finish in 2022. Her recent research with Sanders looks at the significant influence of shame and recognition amongst 12–17 year olds transitioning to adulthood, and how social workers can recognise this and better support them.

As part of the Youth Transitions Project, Munford and Sanders created an online tool, the PARTH model, for people working with vulnerable youth. Based on 107 detailed case studies from 593 participant, the model is designed to help youth workers make better decisions, and builds on a similar international study led by Michael Ungar at Dalhousie University. Munford and Sanders have also prepared guidelines for employers working with young people, particularly helping them transition into work.

== Selected works ==
- Munford, Robyn; Sanders, Jackie (2020). "Shame and recognition: Social work practice with vulnerable young people". Child & Family Social Work. 25 (1): 53–61. doi:10.1111/cfs.12652. ISSN 1365-2206. S2CID 181954997.
- Munford, Robyn; Sanders, Jackie (2016). "Understanding service engagement: Young people's experience of service use". Journal of Social Work. 16 (3): 283–302. doi:10.1177/1468017315569676. S2CID 144820644.
- Sanders, Jackie; Munford, Robyn; Thimasarn-Anwar, Tewaporn; Liebenberg, Linda; Ungar, Michael (2015). "The role of positive youth development practices in building resilience and enhancing wellbeing for at-risk youth". Child Abuse & Neglect. 42: 40–53. doi:10.1016/j.chiabu.2015.02.006. PMID 25770347.
- Sanders, Jackie; Munford, Robyn (2008). "Losing self to the future? Young women's strategic responses to adulthood transitions". Journal of Youth Studies. 11 (3): 331–346. doi:10.1080/13676260801946480. S2CID 145141951.
- Nash, Mary; Munford, Robyn; O'Donoghue, Kieran (2005). Social work theories in action. London: Jessica Kingsley Publishers. ISBN 1-84642-100-4. OCLC 61610408.
- Sanders, Jackie; Munford, Robyn, eds. (2003). Making a difference in families : research that creates change. Crows Nest, N.S.W.: Allen & Unwin. ISBN 1-86508-909-5. OCLC 52686780.
- Munford, Robyn; Walsh-Tapiata, Wheturangi (2001). Strategies for change : community development in Aotearoa/New Zealand. Palmerston North, NZ: School of Social Policy and Social Work.
- Munford, Robyn; Sanders, Jackie (1999). Supporting families. Palmerston North, N.Z.: Dunmore Press. ISBN 0-86469-337-0. OCLC 44881694.
