= Denise L'Estrange-Corbet =

New Zealand fashion designer and businesswoman

Dame Denise L'Estrange-Corbet DNZM
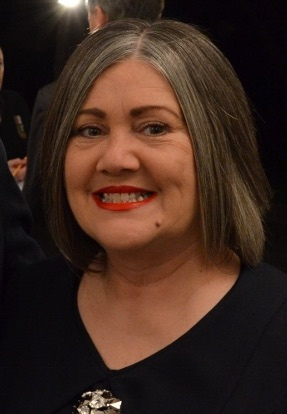
- L'Estrange-Corbet in 2014
- Born: 1959 or 1960 (age 65–66)
- Occupations: Fashion designer and businesswoman
- Known for: Founded WORLD

Dame Denise Ann L'Estrange-Corbet DNZM (born 1959 or 1960) is a New Zealand fashion designer and businesswoman. She founded WORLD, a fashion label, in 1989 with her then husband, Francis Hooper.

== Personal life ==
L'Estrange-Corbet published her autobiography, All That Glitters, in 2008, in which she discussed her childhood in London and her history of depression. At the age of 3 her mother took her and her sister to England to escape an abusive alcoholic father, and she was raised in London. She appeared in a Ministry of Health campaign aimed at reducing the stigma of suffering from depression.

L'Estrange-Corbet and Francis Hooper are the parents of gossip columnist Pebbles Hooper.

== Honours and awards ==
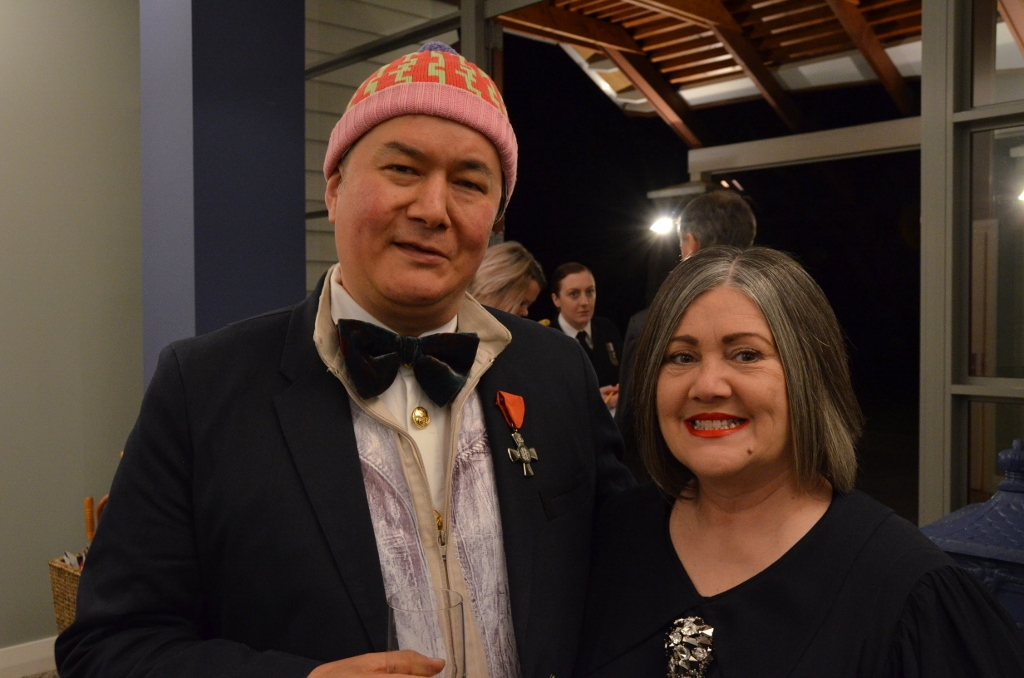
L'Estrange-Corbet with Francis Hooper at an investiture dinner in 2014, following Hooper's appointment as a MNZM

In 1995 WORLD's designs won the Avant Garde category at the Benson & Hedges Fashion Design Award, a $5000 prize. In the 2002 Queen's Birthday and Golden Jubilee Honours, L'Estrange-Corbet was appointed a Member of the New Zealand Order of Merit (MNZM), for services to fashion design. She was promoted to Dame Companion (DNZM) of the same order in the 2018 New Year Honours, for services to fashion and the community. She won the Westpac New Zealand Women of Influence Award in 2017 in the category Art and Culture. In 2015 WORLD became the first fashion brand to be endorsed by the United Nations.

== Controversy ==
In May 2018, online news platform The Spinoff criticised L'Estrange-Corbet's brand WORLD for selling imported clothes with a label attached saying "Made in New Zealand" in French, after she herself had made frequent criticisms of labour conditions of imported products. The brand had not been rated by TEAR Fund's labour standards ratings scheme because of the claim all the products were made in New Zealand. L'Estrange-Corbet defended WORLD's practices, calling the story "gutter journalism" and a "beat-up", and saying that the "clothing tags that say 'Made in NZ' are made in NZ, so there is nothing misleading about this".

== Publications ==
- L'Estrange-Corbet, Denise (2008). All That Glitters. Auckland, New Zealand: Random House New Zealand. ISBN 978-1869790424.
