= Gay Williams =

New Zealand nurse

Barbara Gay Williams is a retired New Zealand nurse.

== Biography ==
Williams completed a PhD at Victoria University of Wellington, with a thesis on nursing in the 1960s through to the 1990s. Williams served as executive director of the New Zealand Nurses Organisation, and led negotiations on pay and working conditions for nurses.

=== Recognition ===
In the 1991 New Year Honours, Williams was appointed a Companion of the Queen's Service Order for public services. In 1993 Williams was awarded a New Zealand Suffrage Centennial Medal. In the 2002 Queen's Birthday and Golden Jubilee Honours, she was made a Companion of the New Zealand Order of Merit, for services to nursing.
