= Betty Flint =

New Zealand scientist

Betty Flint OBE
- Born: Elizabeth Alice Flint; 26 May 1909; Edmonton, London, England
- Died: 7 December 2011 (aged 102); New Zealand
- Education: Queen Mary College, London
- Scientific career
- Fields: Freshwater algae
- Thesis: An investigation of the distribution in time and space of the algae of a water-reservoir (Barn Elms) (1940)
- Doctoral advisors: Felix Eugen Fritsch

Elizabeth Alice Flint OBE (26 May 1909 – 7 December 2011) was a New Zealand botanist who specialised in freshwater algae. She co-authored the three-volume series Flora of New Zealand Desmids in the 1980s and 1990s.

== Early life and education ==
Born in Edmonton, London, England, on 26 May 1909, Flint was raised in the London suburb of New Malden until she emigrated with her family to New Zealand in 1921. There, she was educated at St Margaret's College, Christchurch, and went on to study botany at Canterbury University College, graduating with a Master of Science degree in 1936. Her master's thesis was titled The periodicity of the phytoplankton in Lake Sarah, with a consideration of some ecological factors, and required her to carry out field work at Lake Sarah, a sub-alpine lake near the university's field station at Cass. Flint then undertook doctoral studies at Queen Mary College, London, under the supervision of Felix Eugen Fritsch, investigating the changes in distribution of algae in a reservoir at Barn Elms, near Hammersmith. Her thesis was An investigation of the distribution in time and space of the algae of a water-reservoir (Barn Elms).

== Career ==
During World War II, Flint worked in London at the Metropolitan Water Board laboratory, and then, between 1943 and 1945, did operational research for the Royal Air Force. She then worked at the Shirley Institute of the British Cotton Industry Research Association, before returning to New Zealand in 1947 to lecture in botany at Victoria University College in Wellington. However, in 1948, she returned to Britain, to lecture botany at the University of Leeds, and then, from 1950, at University College Hull.

Flint returned to New Zealand in 1955 as her father was terminally ill, but was unable to find full-time employment. She worked part-time at the Department of Scientific and Industrial Research (DSIR) until retiring in 1974. She conducted research into terrestrial and freshwater algae, and published over 30 scientific papers.

The standard author abbreviation E.A.Flint is used to indicate this person as the author when citing a botanical name.

== Later life and death ==
From 1987, Flint was a research associate in the DSIR botany division, and co-wrote the three-volume series Flora of New Zealand Desmids with Hannah Croasdale and Marilyn Racine, published between 1986 and 1994. She continued research in a voluntary capacity at Lincoln University and Landcare Research two days a week, until she was 100 years old, and was co-author of a scientific paper published when she was aged 101. She died on 7 December 2011.

== Honours and awards ==
In 1990, Flint was awarded the New Zealand 1990 Commemoration Medal. In the 1991 New Year Honours, she was appointed an Officer of the Order of the British Empire, for services to botany. In 2017, Flint was selected as one of the Royal Society Te Apārangi's "150 women in 150 words", a project celebrating the contributions of women to expanding knowledge in New Zealand.
