= 1991 New Year Honours (New Zealand) =

Annual awards for New Zealanders

The 1991 New Year Honours in New Zealand were appointments by Elizabeth II on the advice of the New Zealand government to various orders and honours to reward and highlight good works by New Zealanders. The awards celebrated the passing of 1990 and the beginning of 1991, and were announced on 31 December 1990.

The recipients of honours are displayed here as they were styled before their new honour.

== Knight Bachelor ==
- James Belich – of Wellington. For services to local government and the community.
- The Right Honourable (Mr Justice) Gordon Ellis Bisson – of Wellington; lately a judge of the Court of Appeal.
- The Honourable Roger Owen Douglas – of Auckland. For public services.
- Dr David Russell Hay CBE – of Christchurch. For services to the New Zealand Heart Foundation.
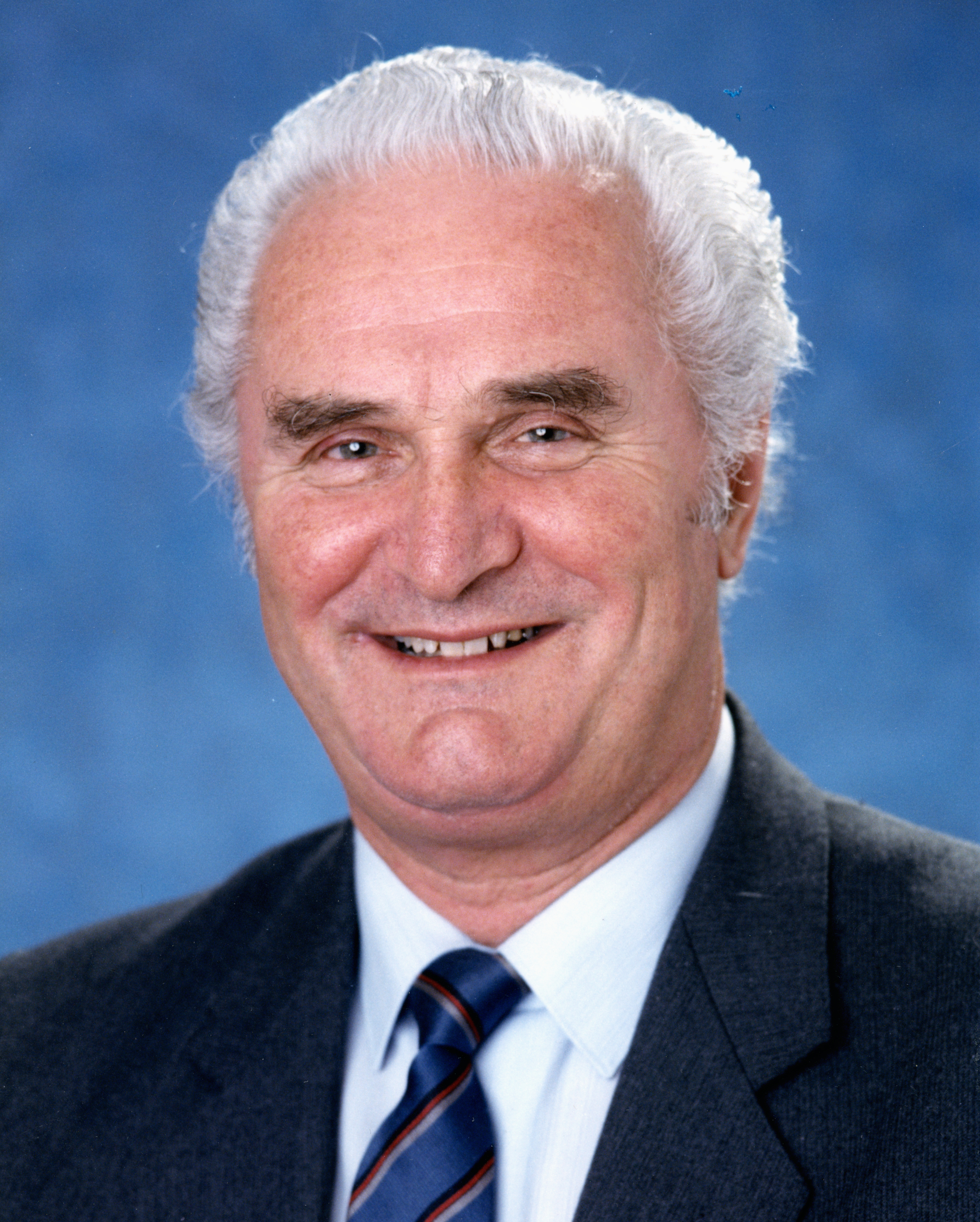
Sir James Belich

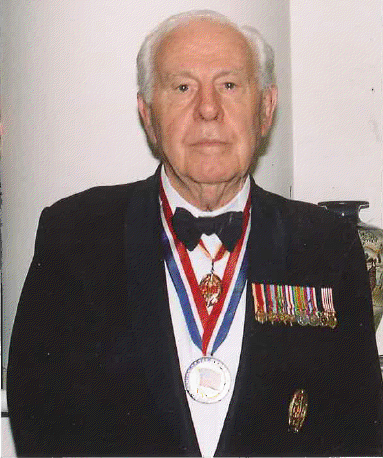
Sir Gordon Bisson

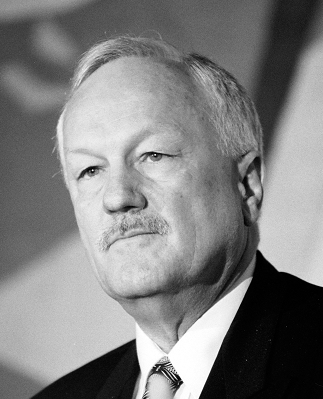
Sir Roger Douglas

== Order of Saint Michael and Saint George ==
=== Knight Commander (KCMG) ===
- The Right Honourable Geoffrey Winston Russell Palmer – of Wellington; Prime Minister of New Zealand, 1989–1990.
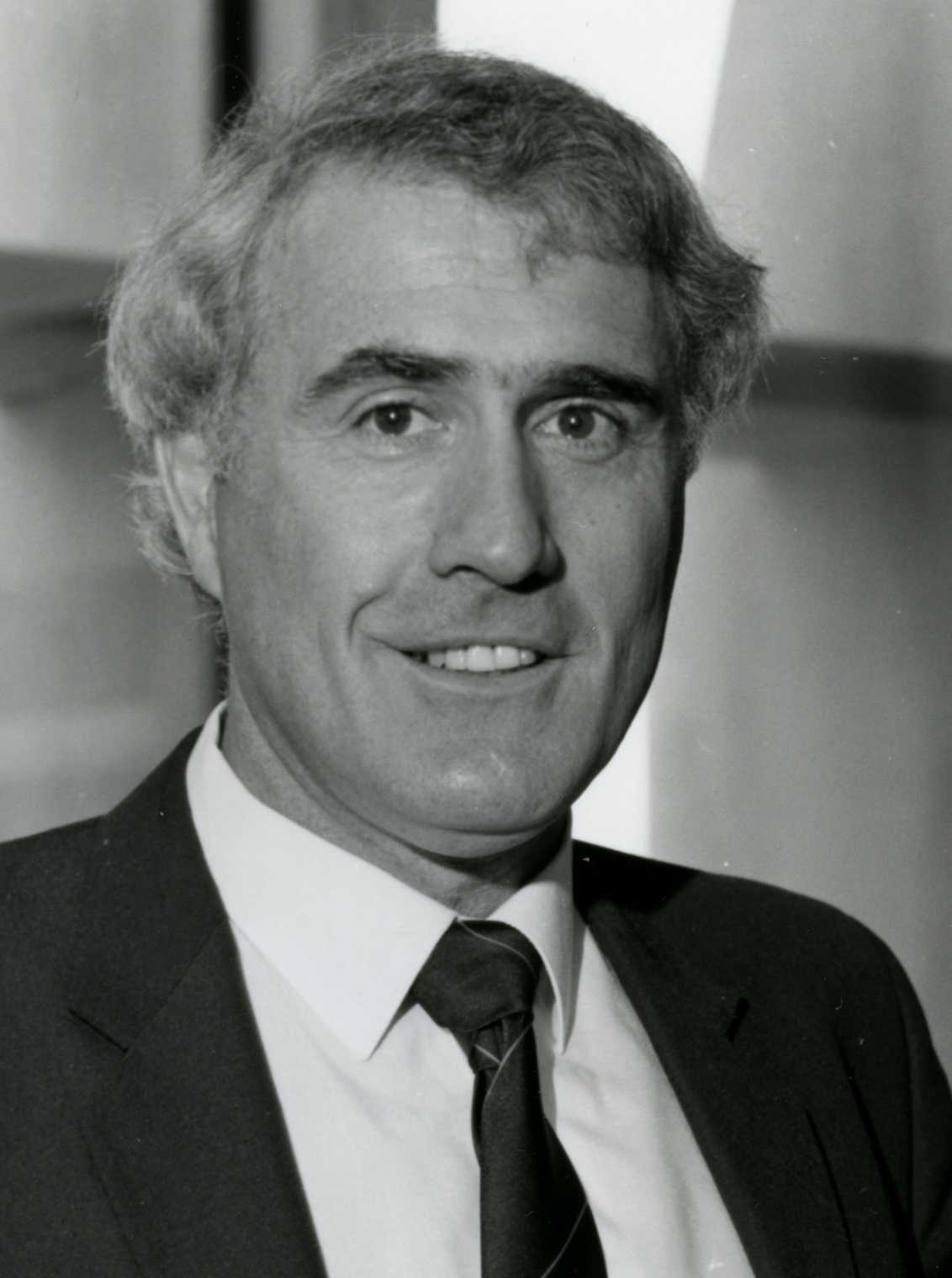
Sir Geoffrey Palmer

=== Companion (CMG) ===
- Walter Iles QC – of Wellington; Chief Parliamentary Counsel.
- The Honourable Stanley Joseph Rodger – of Dunedin. For public services.
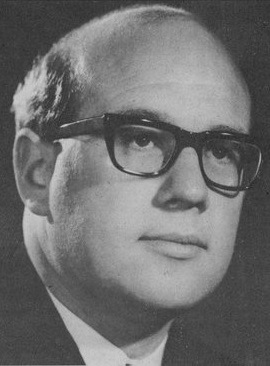
Stan Rodger

== Royal Victoria Order ==
=== Lieutenant (LVO) ===
- Paul George Canham – lately Official Secretary, Government House.

== Order of the British Empire ==
=== Dame Commander (DBE) ===
Civil division

- Stella Katherine Casey – of Wellington. For services to the community.

=== Commander (CBE) ===
Civil division

- Dr Donald Maurice Geddes Beasley OBE – of Whangārei. For services to the intellectually handicapped, health administration and the community.
- James Alan Burnet – of Wellington. For services to the newspaper industry.
- David James Frith – of Wellsford; chairman, New Zealand Meat Producers Board.
- Professor Barbara Farnsworth Heslop – of Dunedin. For services to medical education.
- Canon Wi Te Tau Huata QSO MC – of Hastings. For services to the community
- Phoebe Churchill Meikle – of Auckland. For services to education and literature.
- Arthur Douglas Myers – of Auckland. For services to business management.
- John James (Jack) Shallcrass – of Wellington. For services to education.

Military division

- Air Commodore John Stewart Boys OBE AFC – Royal New Zealand Air Force.
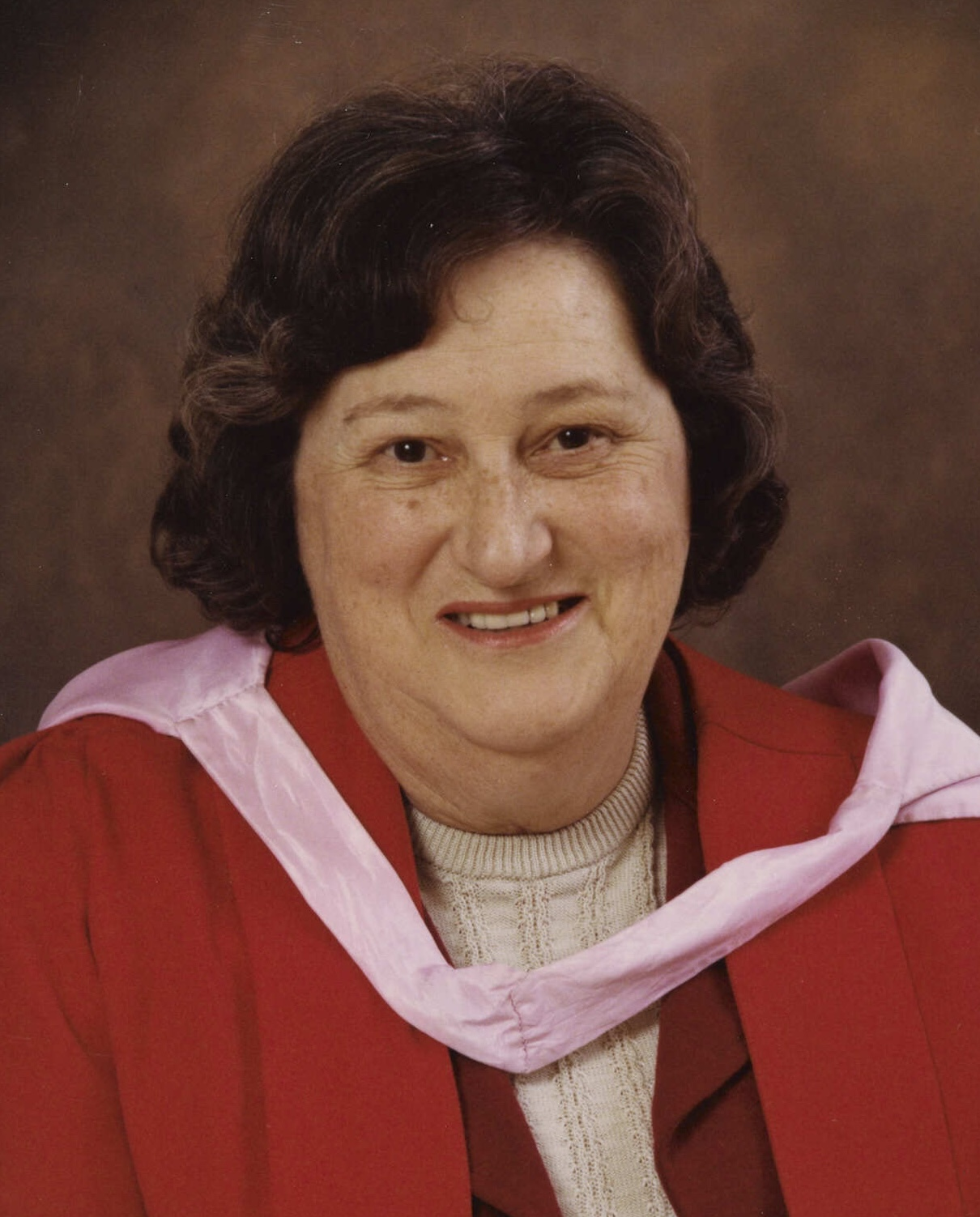
Barbara Heslop

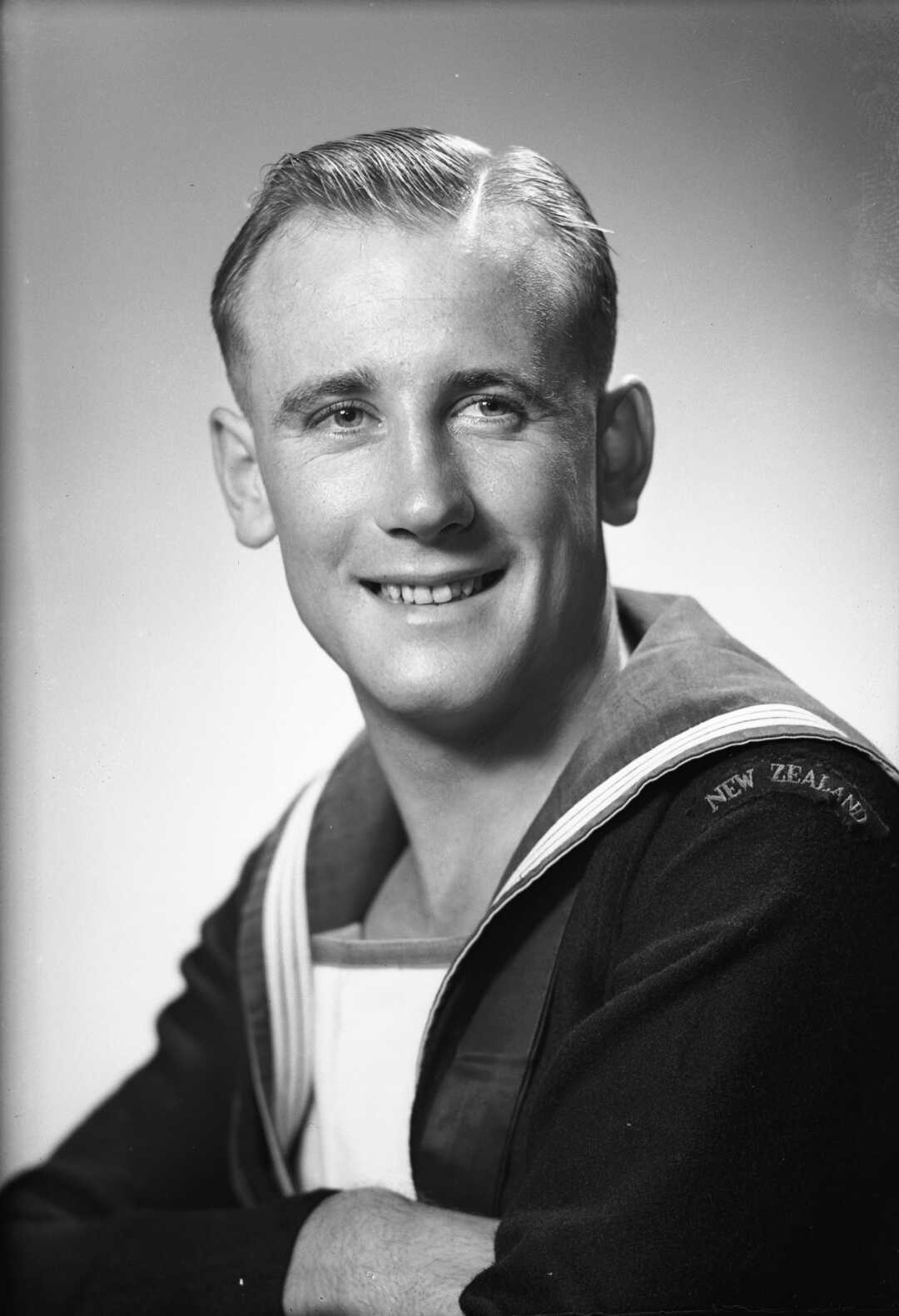
Jack Shallcrass

=== Officer (OBE) ===
Civil division

- Frederick Richard Allen – of Auckland. For services to rugby.
- Peter James Blake MBE – of Emsworth, Hampshire, England. For services to yachting.
- John Edward Bolderson – of Levin. For services to local government.
- The Honourable Trevor Albert de Cleene – of Palmerston North. For public services.
- Patrick James Downey – of Wellington. For services to the community.
- Edward Farnon – of London, England. For services to international trade.
- Dr Elizabeth Alice Flint – of Christchurch. For services to botany.
- Arnot Malcolm McConnell – of Auckland. For services to engineering and export.
- Ian Lindsay Mills LVO – Assistant Commissioner, New Zealand Police.
- Ian Barry Mune – of Kaukapakapa. For services to the theatre and film industry.
- Richard Barton Rainey – of Nelson. For services to the community.
- Professor David Christopher Graham Skegg – of Dunedin. For services to medicine.
- David John Stock – of Christchurch. For services to the legal profession.
- Peter William Taylor – of Alexandra. For services to the fruit industry.
- Graeme Allen Thompson – of Christchurch. For services to export.
- Gladys Ellen Walker – of Auckland. For services to bowls.
- Guyon Russell Wells – of Hamilton. For services to music.

Military division

- Captain John Andrew Westphall – Royal New Zealand Navy.
- Colonel David George Flux – Colonels' List, New Zealand Army.
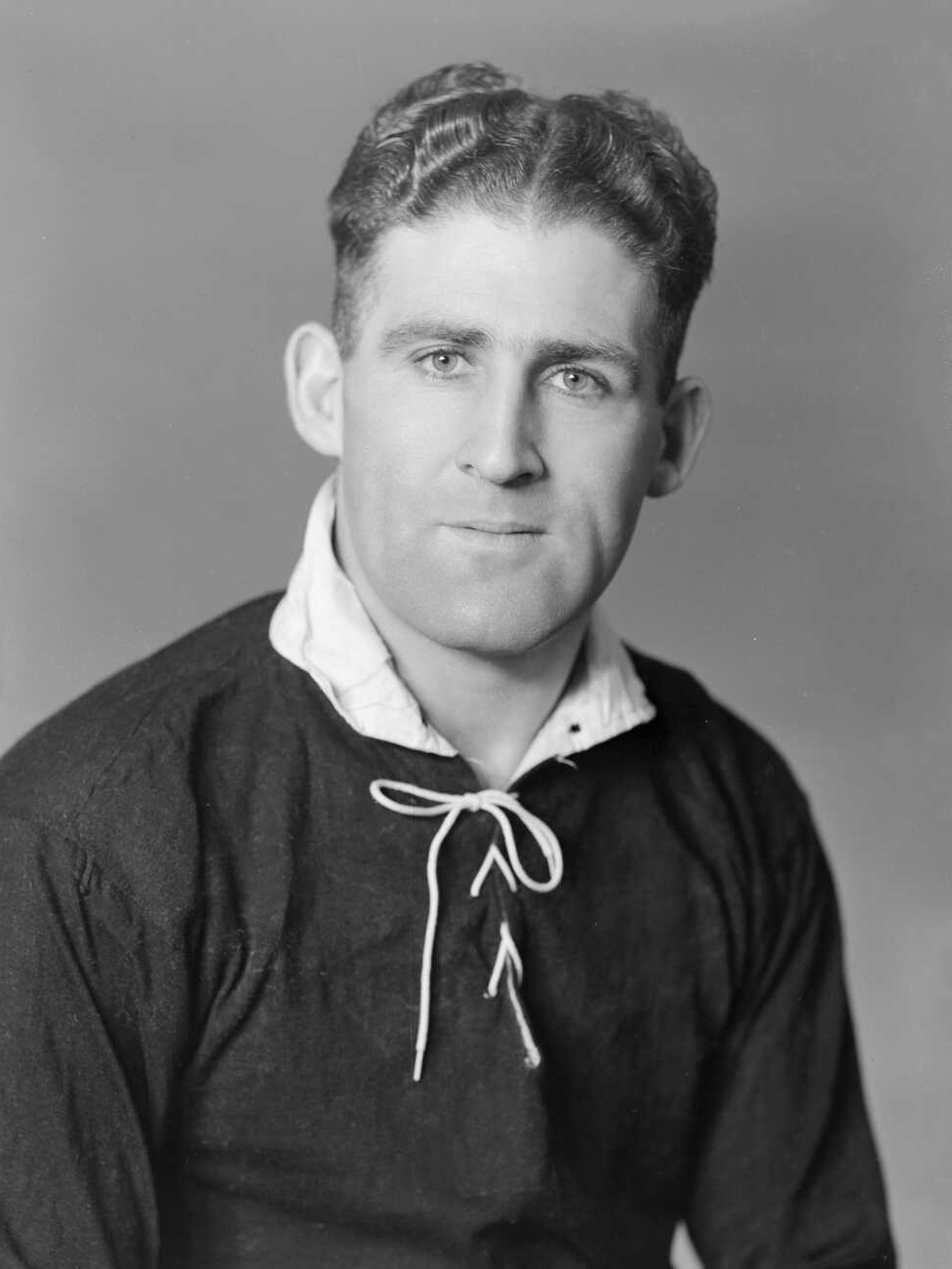
Fred Allen

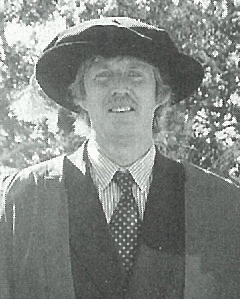
Peter Blake

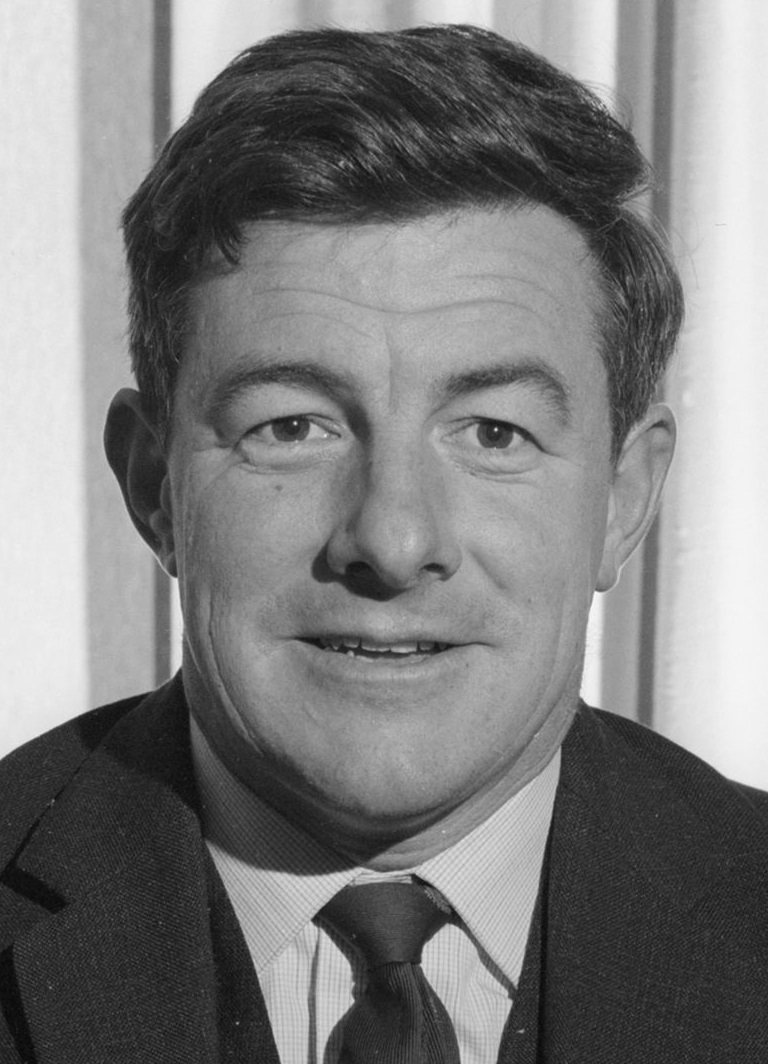
Trevor de Cleene

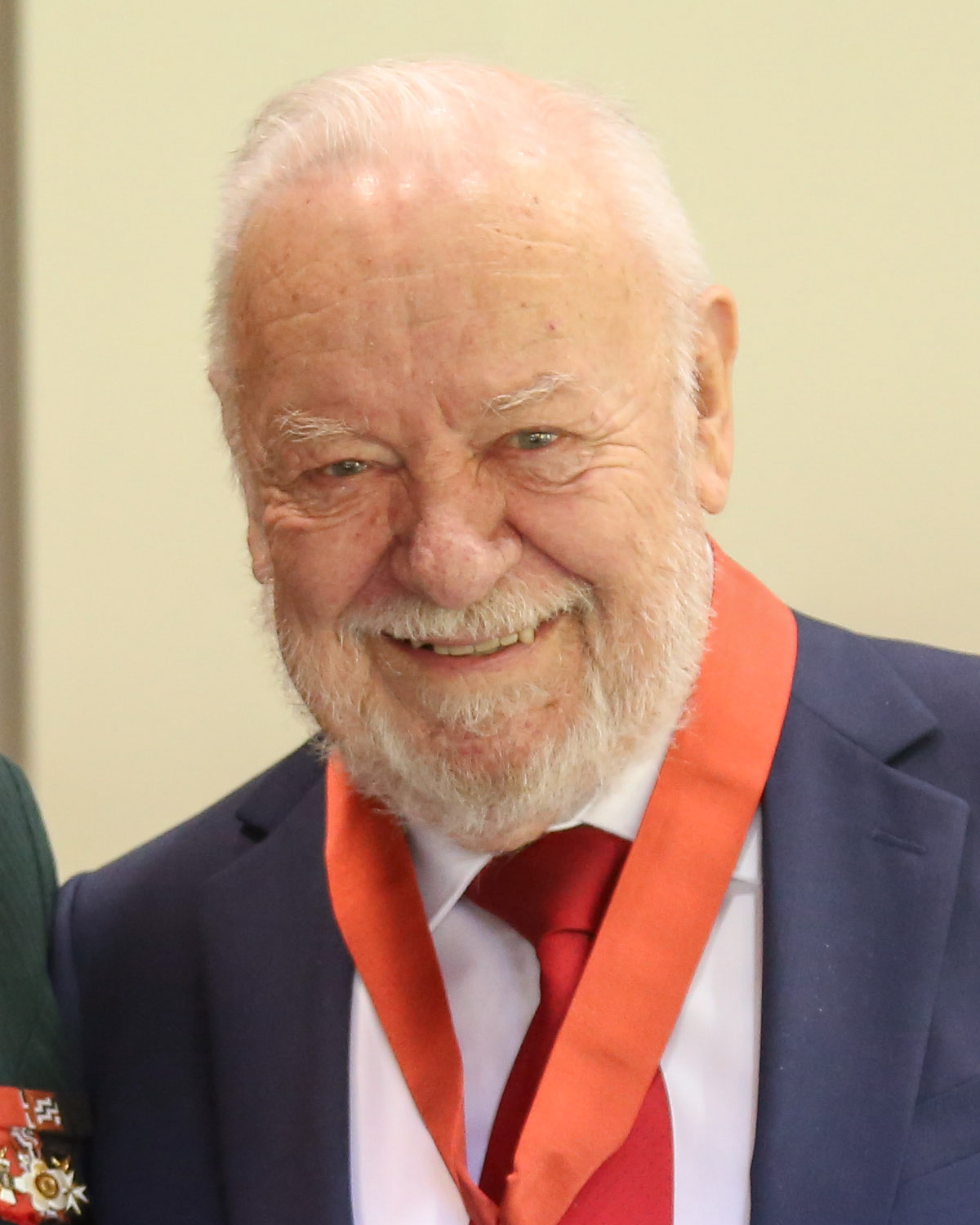
Ian Mune

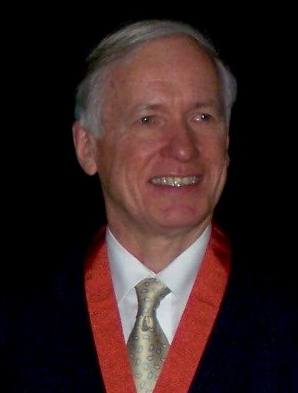
David Skegg

=== Member (MBE) ===
Civil division

- Leslie Wightman Barber – superintendent, New Zealand Police.
- Dr Peter Walter Theodore Brandt – of Auckland. For services to cardiac radiology.
- Joseph Annis Corban – of Auckland. For services to viticultural industry, and the community.
- Noel Effie Burn – of Paraparaumu. For services to women's bowls.
- Dr Grahame David Craig – of Hamilton. For services to business management and the community.
- Noel Edward Crawley JP – of Orewa. For services to education and the community.
- Egbert Feist – of Wanganui. For services to local government and the community.
- Edward Kingsley Fletcher JP – of New Plymouth. For services to local authorities and the community.
- Robert Charles Francis – of Masterton. For services to local government and the community.
- Terence Charles Hansen – of Christchurch. For services to the furniture industry and the community.
- Ronald Fife Hardie JP – of Kawerau. For services to local government.
- Karen Margaret Holliday – of Motueka. For services to cycling.
- Kevin Louis Hope JP – of Greymouth. For services to trade-union affairs and the community.
- Murray Clarke Loudon – of Auckland. For services to the dental profession and the community.
- Hugh Joseph McGahan – of Blakehurst, New South Wales, Australia. For services to rugby league.
- Ronald Marston JP – of Petone. For services to local-body and community affairs.
- Rora Pakititi – of Te Kūiti. For services to the community.
- Archibald John Philpot – of Auckland. For services to the community.
- Samuel Kevin Prime – of Kawakawa. For services to the community.
- Selwyn Ingram Rowley – of Auckland. For services to crippled children.
- William Alexander Russ – of Auckland. For services to the community.
- Wayne Thomas Shelford – of Silverdale. For services to rugby.
- Heather Victoria Spurle – of Auckland. For services to sports.
- Julie-Ann Townsend – of Auckland. For services to netball.
- Dr John Moore Tweed – of Wellington. For services to rheumatology.

Military Division

- Lieutenant Michael Arthur Edsall – Corps of Royal New Zealand Electrical and Mechanical Engineers (Territorial Force).
- Warrant Officer Leslie Ross Marfell – Royal New Zealand Air Force.
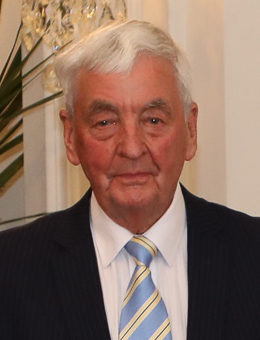
Bob Francis

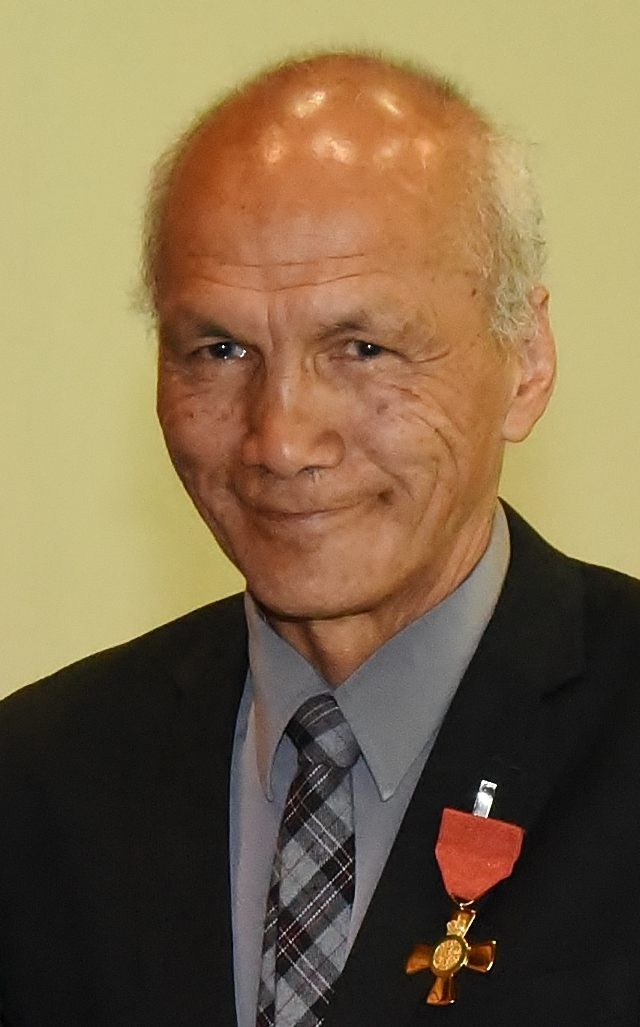
Kevin Prime

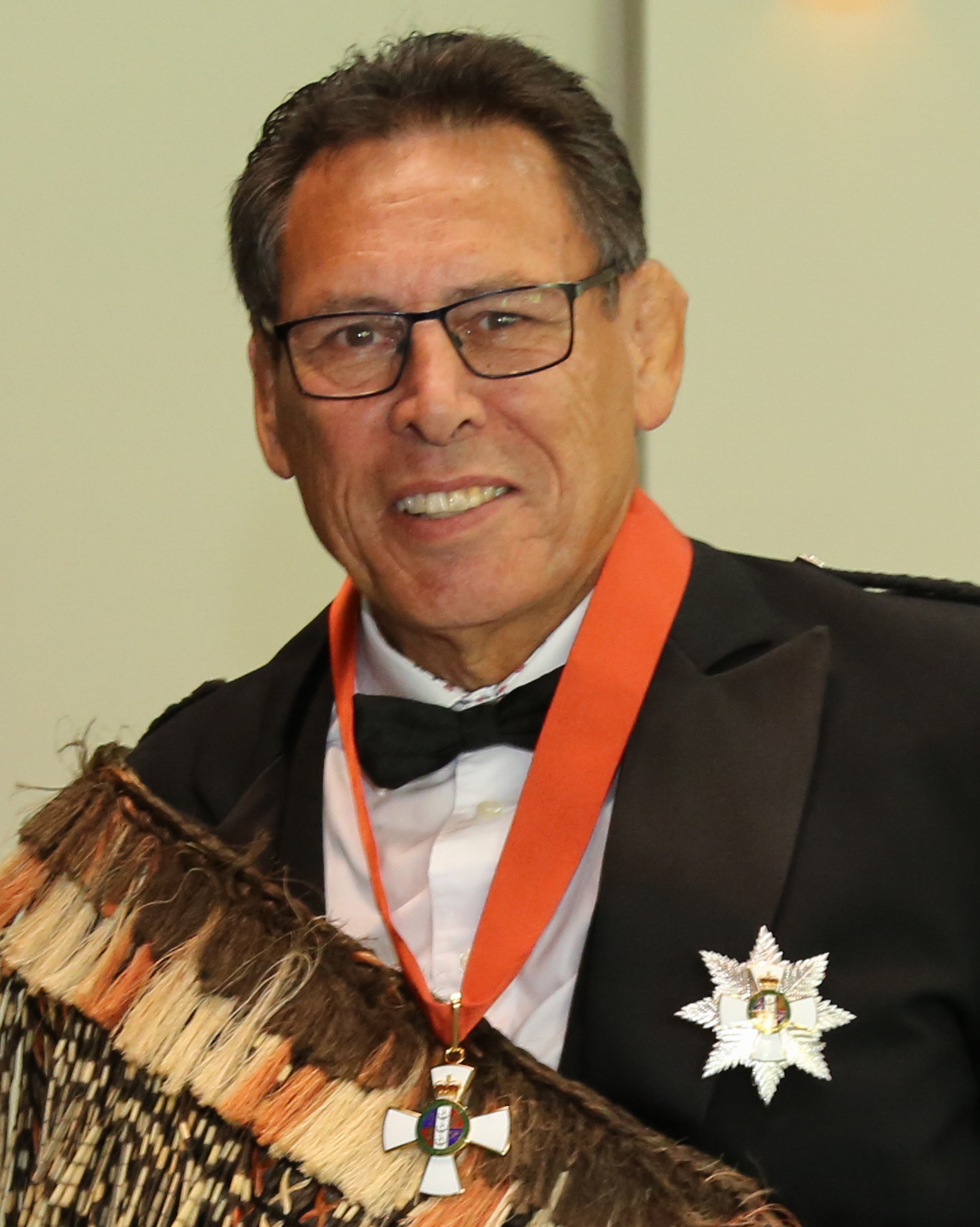
Buck Shelford

== British Empire Medal (BEM) ==
Military division

- Temporary Warrant Officer Class II Paul Edward Napier – Royal New Zealand Armoured Corps.
- Staff Sergeant Stephen John Yates – Royal New Zealand Infantry Regiment.
- Flight Sergeant Clive Peter Harragan – Royal New Zealand Air Force.

== Companion of the Queen's Service Order (QSO) ==
=== For community service ===
- Whatumoana Paki – of Huntly.
- Itieli Pereira – of Fakaofo, Tokelau.
- Peter Graham Siddell – of Auckland.
- Thomas Arthur Varley OBE KPFSM – of Waikanae.
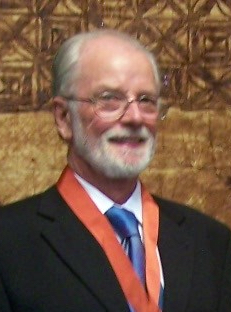
Peter Siddell

=== For public services ===
- Judith Ola Bassett – of Auckland.
- Arnold Frank Crothall – of Christchurch.
- Robert Anthony Regis Harvey – of Auckland.
- Andrew Kirkland – of Wellington; lately managing director, New Zealand Forestry Corporation.
- Judy Margaret Lessing – of New York, United States
- Ian McLean – of Rotorua.
- Dr (Elizabeth) Anne Meade – of Wellington.
- Barbara Gay Williams JP – of Wellington.
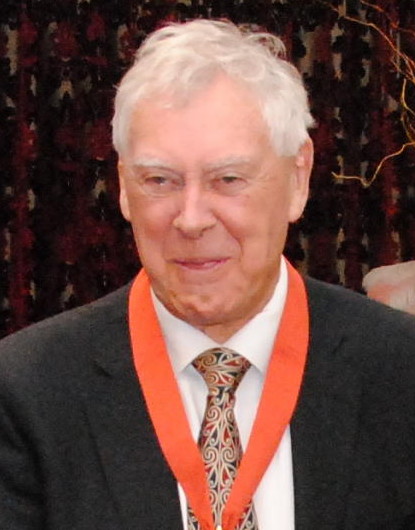
Bob Harvey

== Queen's Service Medal (QSM) ==
=== For community service ===
- Evelyn Ellen Mary Baigent – of Tākaka.
- Brysson Gurle le Comte Bartley – of Auckland.
- Isabella May Blair JP – of Napier.
- Patricia Gweneith Broad – of Dunedin.
- Norman Colin Brown – of Waimate.
- Winiata Brown – of Kaitaia.
- Doris Elizabeth Church – of Christchurch.
- Sydney Cormack – of Tuatapere.
- Te Haruru (Ruru) Cook – of Cromwell.
- Johannes Gerardus de Jager JP – of Auckland.
- Anthony William Finnigan – of Palmerston North.
- William Robert Hamer – of Wellington.
- Stanley Lionel Harris – of Auckland.
- Francis Leo Hendrey – of Auckland.
- Te Aukura David Isaia – of Porirua.
- Francis William James Jennings – of Auckland.
- Lawrence Fredrick Cecil Johnson – of Christchurch.
- Valerie Merle Jones – of Te Kūiti.
- The Reverend Romana Tautari Kingi JP – of Whakatāne.
- Amy Anealeise Laban – of Wainuiomata.
- The Reverend Father Michael Lapsley – of Victoria, Australia.
- Robert Francis McCallum – of Wellington.
- Eva Ruth Mann – of Waimate.
- Daphne Meyer – of Ōtaki.
- Frances Betty Monehan – of Murupara.
- Joseph Murray – of Kaitaia.
- Helen Nicoll JP – of Auckland.
- Cyril O'Neill – of Christchurch.
- Shanti Thakor Parbhu Patel JP – of Auckland.
- Donna Marguerite Philpott – of Wellington.
- Sai Mere Ro Ikadroka Powley – of Auckland.
- The Reverend John Scott – of Wairoa.
- The Reverend Leiite Setefano – of Auckland.
- Ganges Singh JP – of Pukekohe.
- Frederick Strachan – of Dunedin.
- Wilfred Allen Subritzky – of Auckland.
- Heni Materoa Sunderland JP – of Gisborne.
- Laurie Oliver Wallace Sutton JP – of Lower Hutt.
- Thomas Robert Taylor – of Rotorua.
- Daphne Joan Terpstra – of Christchurch.
- Robert Timu JP – of Clive.
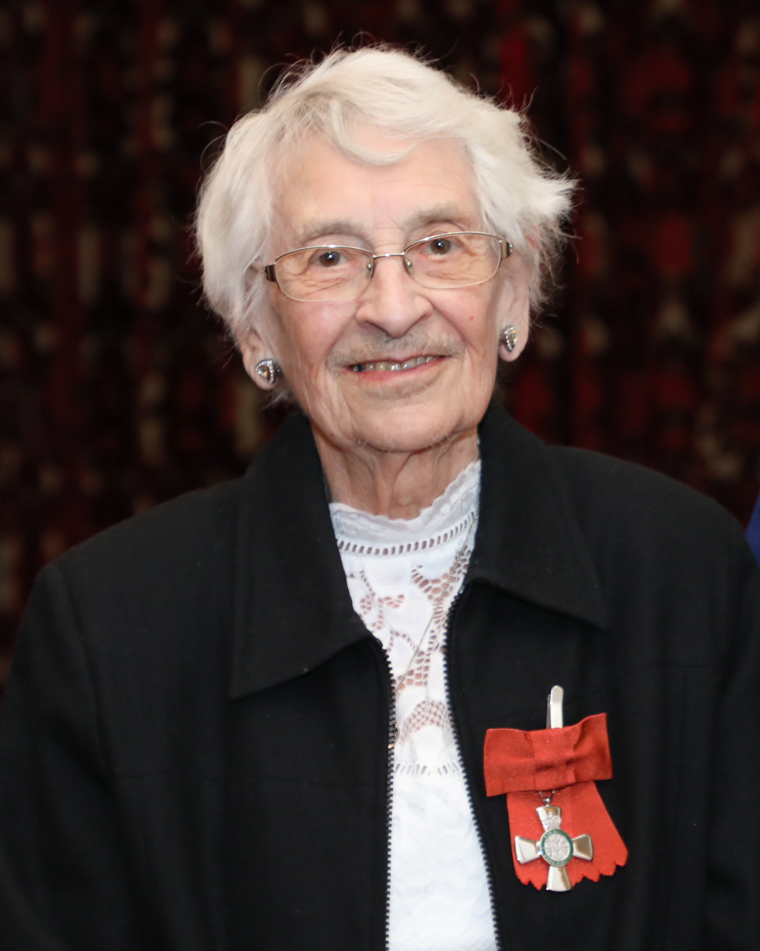
Patricia Broad

=== For public services ===
- Rey Sevlin Aanensen – of Wanganui; traffic sergeant, Ministry of Transport.
- Michael Gunter Ahrens – of Manukau City.
- Patricia Cameron Allan JP – of Cambridge.
- Roy Middlemiss Atkin – of Wellington.
- Francis Edmund Barnard – of Auckland.
- Angus Ross Black – of Dunedin.
- Ngaire Elizabeth Bone JP – of Hastings.
- Edward Cranley Britnell JP – of Christchurch.
- Joan Catherine Brocklehurst – of Napier.
- Hilary Megan Brown – of Christchurch.
- Peter George Bush – of Wellington.
- Philip Alan Powell Chitty – of Auckland; regional manager (border operations), Customs Department, Auckland.
- MacDonald William Garioch Clunie – of Paraparaumu.
- Graeme Michael Cockroft JP – of Invercargill; lately district manager, Traffic Safety Service, Ministry of Transport (Invercargill City).
- Fredrick Charles Domanic Cole JP – of Shannon.
- Robert Yeoman Collins – of Rotorua; lately district conservator, Department of Conservation.
- Barry Neville Colman – of Auckland.
- Margaret Walker Cosgrove – of Lower Hutt.
- Jonathan Spencer Dennis – of Wellington.
- Graham David Egarr – of Nelson.
- Bessie Jean Honoré JP – of Paraparaumu Beach.
- Ivan Derrick Quentin Hope JP – of Gisborne.
- Basil William Leech – of Rangiora.
- Violet Constance McHerron – of Westport.
- Dr Jean Winsome McLean – of Hokitika.
- Richard Halstead Marryatt – of Auckland.
- Michael Mattar – of Taumarunui.
- The Reverend Father Gerard Matthew Mills – of Palmerston North.
- William George Mudgway – of Auckland.
- James Douglas Murray – of Marton.
- Peter Albert Norwood – senior constable, New Zealand Police.
- Charles Pearce JP – of Foxton.
- Alan James Ryan – of Auckland.
- Anthony John Srhoy – of Ashburton.
- Roger Bruce Stevenson – of Havelock North.
- Sidney George Tonks – of Auckland.
- Edward Walker JP – of Kaitangata.
- Farquhar Davis Wilkinson – of Wellington.
- Arnold Manaaki Wilson – of Auckland.
- Margaret Anne Wilson – of Tauranga.
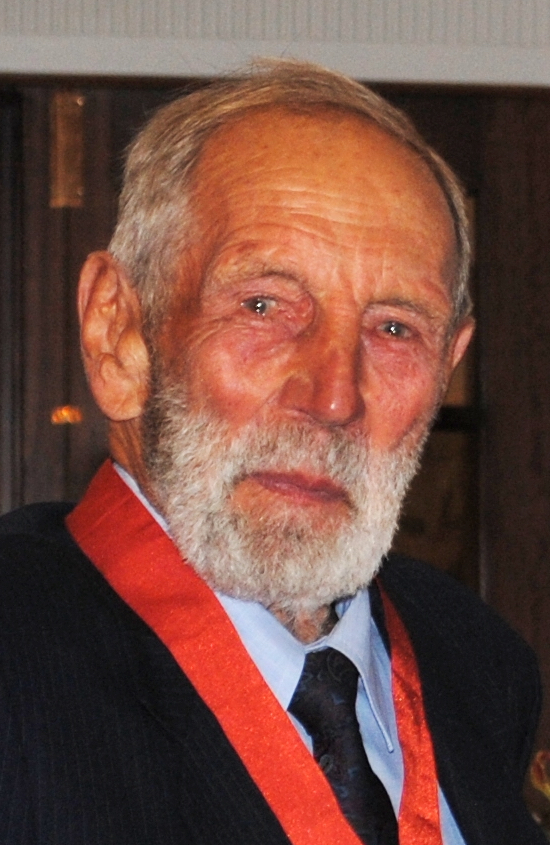
Peter Bush

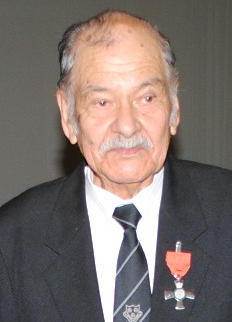
Arnold Wilson

== Queen's Fire Service Medal (QFSM) ==
- Kevin Harvey Henderson – senior fire commander, New Zealand Fire Service.
- Donald Munro Matheson – senior station officer, Invercargill Volunteer Fire Brigade, New Zealand Fire Service.
- Martin Richard Wynn – fireman, Waipawa Volunteer Fire Brigade, New Zealand Fire Service.

== Queen's Police Medal (QPM) ==
- John Graeme Scott – detective senior sergeant, New Zealand Police.

== Air Force Cross (AFC) ==
- Squadron Leader Andrew John McWilliam – Royal New Zealand Air Force.
John McWilliam

== Queen's Commendation for Valuable Service in the Air ==
- Flight Lieutenant Peter Myles Walters – Royal New Zealand Air Force.
