= Murray Loudon =

New Zealand field hockey player (1931–2019)

Murray Loudon MBE
Personal information
- Full name: Murray Clarke Loudon
- Born: 29 October 1931 Ashburton, New Zealand
- Died: 30 January 2019 (aged 87)

Sport
- Country: New Zealand
- Sport: Field hockey

Murray Clarke Loudon MBE (29 October 1931 – 30 January 2019) was a New Zealand field hockey player. He represented New Zealand in field hockey between 1954 and 1956, including at the 1956 Olympic Games in Melbourne.

Loudon studied at the University of Otago, graduating with a Bachelor of Dental Surgery with commendation in 1954. In the 1991 New Year Honours, he was appointed a Member of the Order of the British Empire, for services to the dental profession and the community. He died on 30 January 2019.
