= Charmaine Pountney =

New Zealand educator

Charmaine Grace Pountney CNZM is a New Zealand educator, rights activist, writer and orator.

== Biography ==
Pountney attended Epsom Girls' Grammar School in Auckland from 1955 to 1959; in her final year, she was head girl and dux. After finishing high school, she trained as a secondary school teacher.

In 1978, Pountney was appointed headmistress of Auckland Girls' Grammar School, a position she held for 10 years. She then became head of the teachers' college in Hamilton, then founding principal of the School of Education at the University of Waikato.

In 1992, Pountney moved to the Āwhitu Peninsula, where she established an organic farm and orchard, and established the Āwhitu Peninsula Landcare Group. In 2000, she published her autobiography.

=== Awards and recognition ===
In 1993, Pountney received the New Zealand Suffrage Centennial Medal. In the 2002 Birthday Honours, she was appointed a Companion of the New Zealand Order of Merit, for services to education.

=== Personal life, Health and The Kitchen That Makes Mistakes ===
Poutney is openly lesbian. She has been with her partner, Tanya, for 38 years as of 2023. In 2023, Poutney became one of the volunteers of The Kitchen That Makes Mistakes, where it was revealed that she has early onset of vascular dementia as she has decreased short-term memory. During week 3's special service, she was tasked with serving fellow NZ Chef and restauranteur, Gareth Stewart. However, as it was the busiest services the team has had thus far, her memory suffered, completely forgetting their conversation at the start of the service. Days after service, she contracted COVID-19, meaning she missed the second half of the experience including the kid's long lunch service and the final a la carte service with chefs Ganesh Raj and Mike Van de Elzen, broadcaster Jack Tame and dementia experts. She also missed the final "role-change walk and fork service", where she would have shifted to being a kitchen staff, as she started out as a wait staff.

In 2024, she rejoined the rest of season 1 alumni to have lunch at The Origine in Auckland CBD to oversee the seconds season's volunteer's first service, along with Hilary Barry, the show's narrator and Sacha McNeil.

== Publications ==
- Pountney C. G. (2000). Learning our living: a teaching autobiography. Cape Catley.
- Crombie W. Poulson L. & Pountney C. G. (199?). The tension between language and English language in national curricula: a critical study.
- Pountney C. G. Brame G. & New Zealand. (1977). You and your language. School Publications Branch Dept. of Education.
