= 2002 Birthday Honours (New Zealand) =

Awards list for New Zealand

2002 Queen's Birthday and Golden Jubilee Honours
- Previous: 2002 Royal Visit Honours; Next: 2003 New Year Honours
- Type: New Zealand royal honours: Order of New Zealand; New Zealand Order of Merit; Queen's Service Order; Queen's Service Medal
- Date: 3 June 2002
- Country: New Zealand
- Total recipients: 213

The 2002 Queen's Birthday and Golden Jubilee Honours in New Zealand, celebrating the official birthday of Queen Elizabeth II and the golden jubilee of her reign, were appointments made by the Queen in her right as Queen of New Zealand, on the advice of the New Zealand government, to various orders and honours to reward and highlight good works by New Zealanders. They were announced on 3 June 2002.

The recipients of honours are listed here as they were styled before their new honour.

== Order of New Zealand (ONZ) ==
Additional Member

- Dame (Reubina) Ann Ballin DBE – of Christchurch.
- The Right Honourable Sir Robin Brunskill Cooke, The Lord Cooke of Thorndon KBE – of Wellington.
- Professor Sir (Ian) Hugh Kāwharu – of Auckland.
- Dame Catherine Anne Tizard GCMG GCVO DBE QSO – of Auckland.
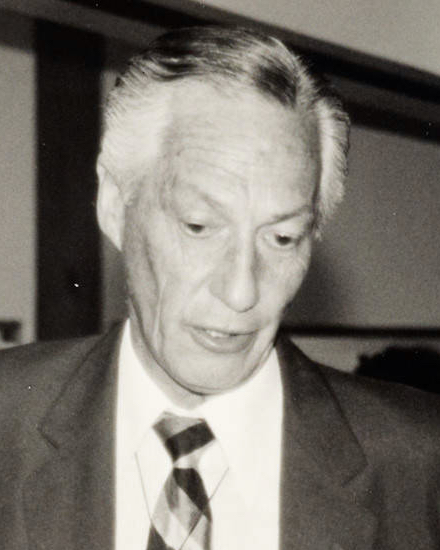
Sir Hugh Kāwharu

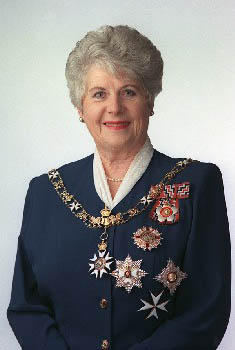
Dame Catherine Tizard

== New Zealand Order of Merit ==
=== Principal Companion (PCNZM) ===
- Sir Patrick Ledger Goodman CBE – of Motueka. For services to business, the arts and the community.
- The Right Honourable Sir Ivor Lloyd Morgan Richardson – of Wellington. For services as president of the Court of Appeal of New Zealand.
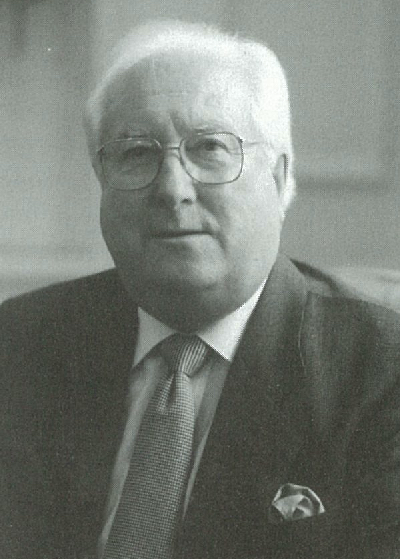
Sir Pat Goodman

=== Distinguished Companion (DCNZM) ===
- Leslie Hutchins OBE JP – of Queenstown. For services to conservation and tourism.
- Professor Vaughan Frederick Randal Jones – of California, United States. For services to mathematics.
- Dr David Charles Mauger – of Auckland. For services to paediatrics.
- Dorothy Huhana Mihinui MBE JP – of Rotorua. For services to Māori, tourism and the community.
- Dr Margaret June Sparrow MBE – of Wellington. For services to medicine and the community.
- Sukhinder Kaur Turner – of Dunedin. For services to local government.
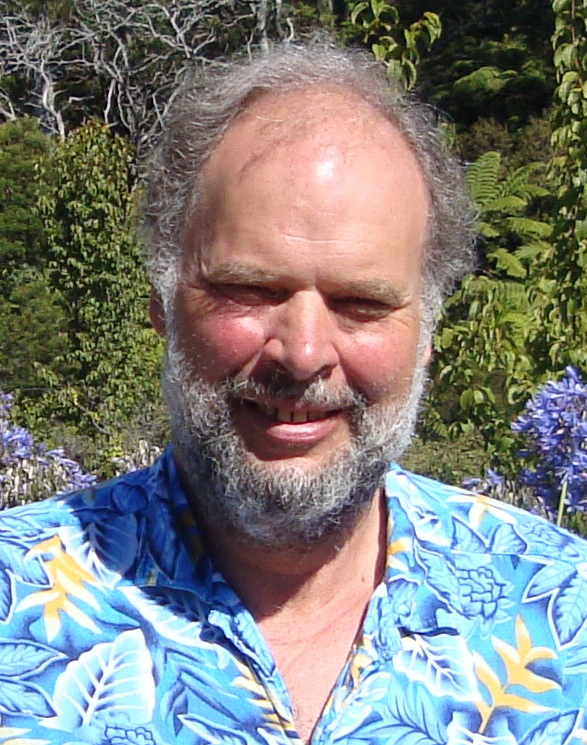
Vaughan Jones

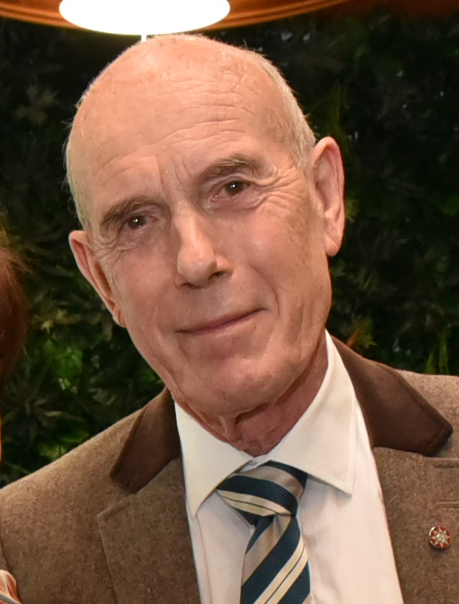
David Mauger

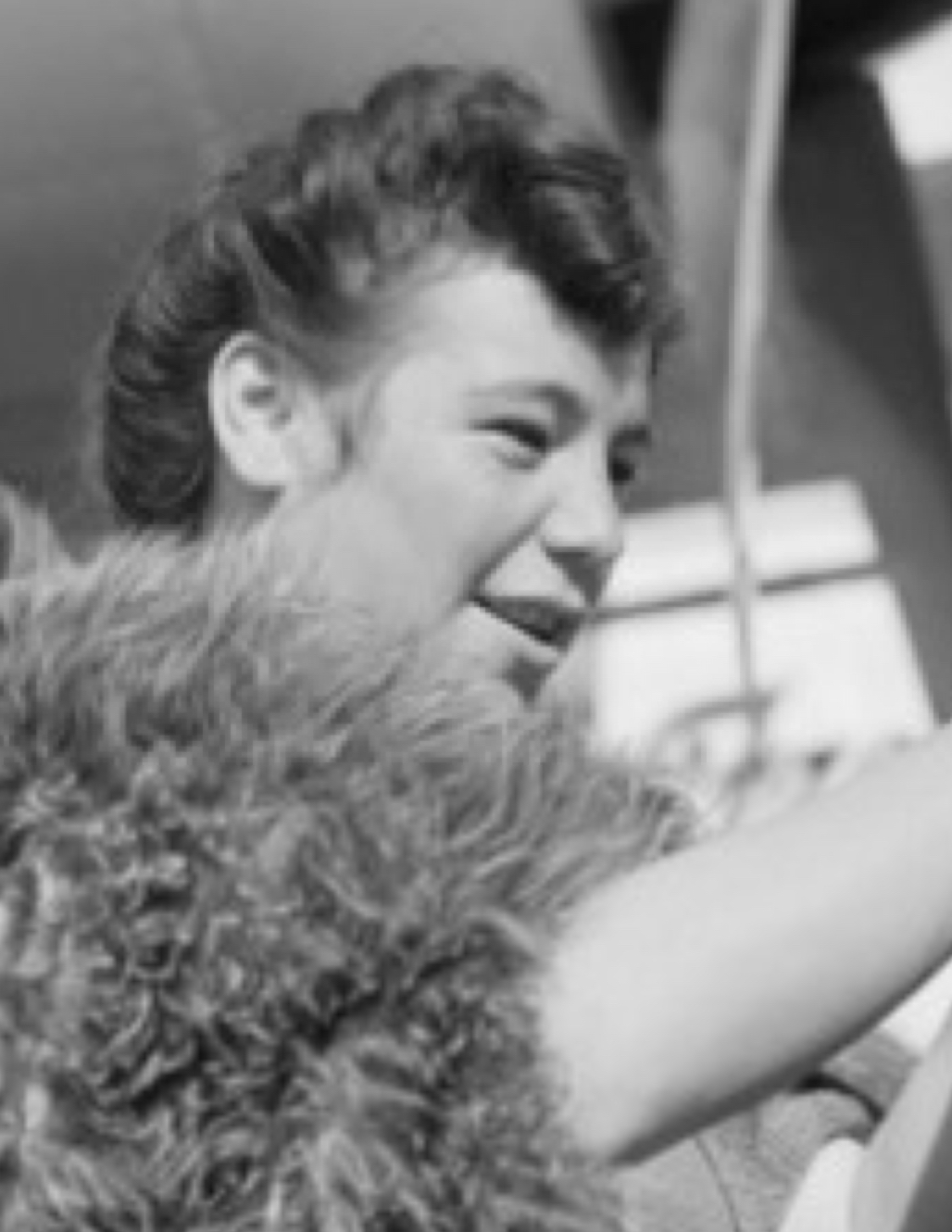
Bubbles Mihinui

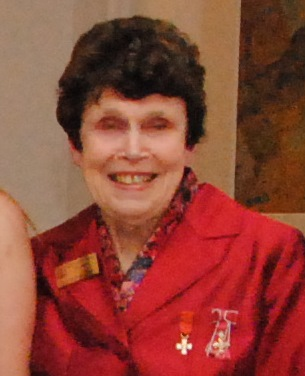
Margaret Sparrow

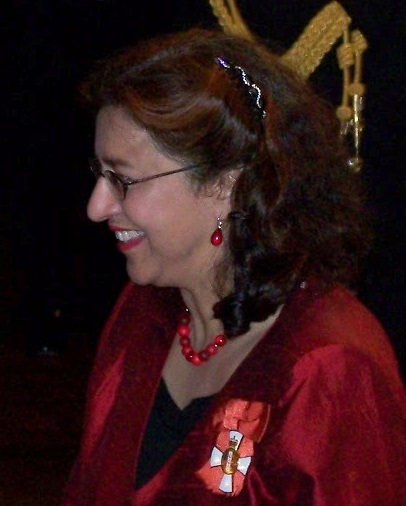
Sukhi Turner

=== Companion (CNZM) ===
- Rosalind Alice Burdon – of Christchurch. For services to the arts and the community.
- Dr Henry Eamonn Connor – of Christchurch. For services to botany.
- John Allan Gallagher JP – of Hamilton. For services to local-body and community affairs.
- Judge Carolyn Henwood – of Wellington. For services as a District and Youth Court judge, and to the arts.
- Dr Diana Florence Hill – of Dunedin. For services to science.
- The Honourable Robert Andrew McGechan QC – of Paraparaumu. For services as a judge of the High Court.
- David Graham McGee QC – of Wellington. For services to Parliament.
- Professor Joel Ivor (Jim) Mann – of Dunedin. For services to medicine.
- Leslie Roy Mills MBE JP – of Auckland. For services to local government and sport.
- Merwyn Norrish – of Wellington. For public services.
- Charmaine Grace Pountney – of Waiuku. For services to education.
- Judge Heather McGregor Simpson – of Thames. For services as a District Court judge.
- Neil Douglas Walter – of Wellington. For services as Secretary of Foreign Affairs and Trade.
- Dr (Barbara) Gay Williams QSO JP – of Auckland. For services to nursing.
- The Right Reverend Bishop Godfrey Edward Armstrong Wilson – of Auckland. For services to the community.
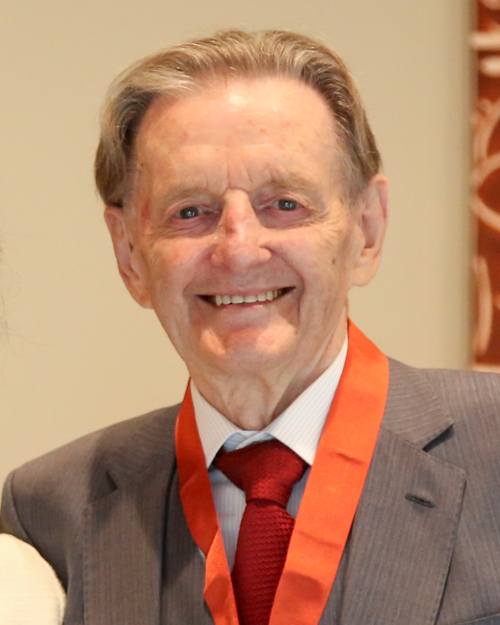
John Gallagher

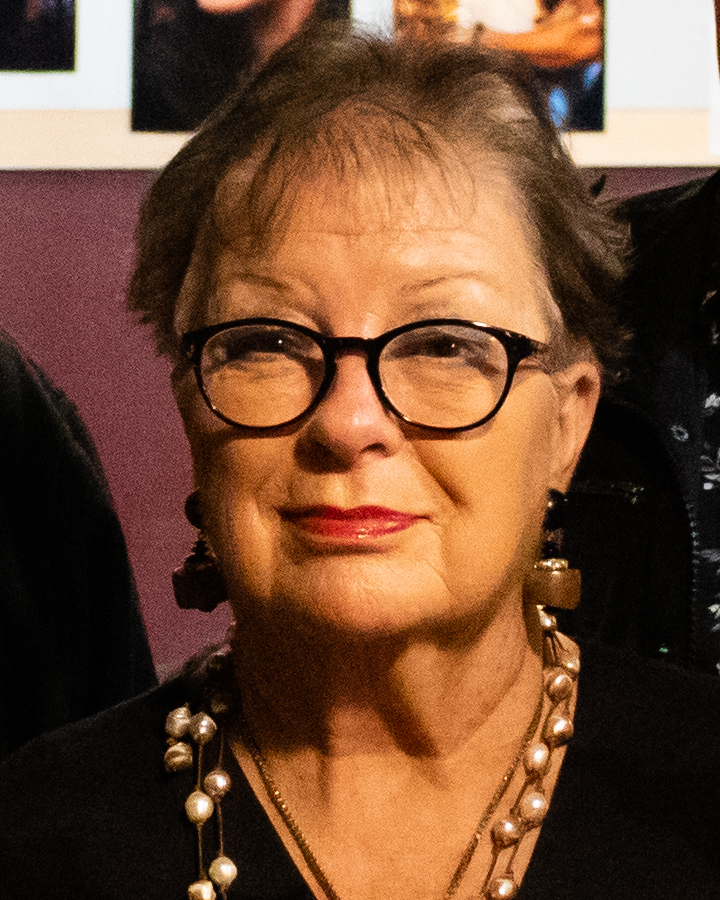
Carolyn Henwood

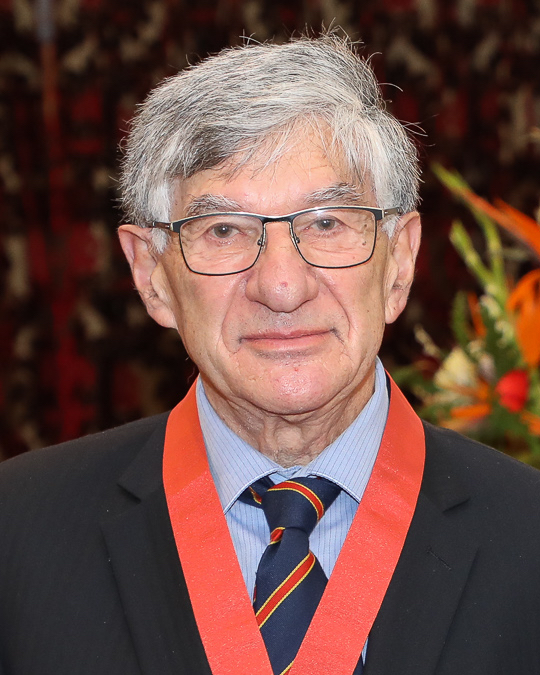
Jim Mann

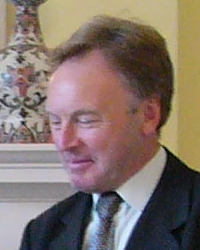
David McGee

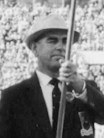
Les Mills

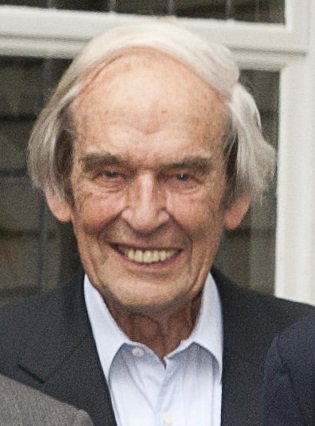
Merv Norrish

=== Officer (ONZM) ===
- Judith Mary Ablett-Kerr QC – of Dunedin. For services to the legal profession.
- Murray Hone Ball – of Gisborne. For services as a cartoonist.
- Dr Helen Maud Bichan – of Wellington. For services to medicine.
- Michael Jonathan Chunn – of Auckland. For services to music.
- Professor Michael Charles Corballis – of Auckland. For services to psychological science.
- Dr Jean Sutherland Fleming – of Dunedin. For services to science.
- Ruth Gilbert (Florence Ruth Mackay) – of Motueka. For services to poetry.
- Rear Admiral Raymond John Gillbanks – Royal New Zealand Navy (Retired).
- Diane Elizabeth Grant – of Masterton. For services to the community.
- The Honourable Peter John Gresham JP – of Waverley. For public services.
- Miranda Catherine Millais Harcourt – of Wellington. For services to theatre and the community.
- Professor Jane Elizabeth Harding – of Auckland. For services to paediatrics.
- Mark Joseph Inglis – of Renwick. For services to persons with disabilities.
- Richard John Killeen – of Auckland. For services to painting.
- James Grant Kirby – of Warkworth. For services to local government.
- Elizabeth Fiona Knox – of Wellington. For services to literature.
- Sheila Kathleen Laxon – of Cambridge. For services to racing.
- Dennis Michael McGrath – of North Shore City. For services to education.
- Harvey John McQueen JP – of Wellington. For services to education and literature.
- Ashley David Mazey – of Taupō. For services to skiing and tourism.
- Professor Robyn Eileen Munford – of Palmerston North. For services to social work education and policy.
- David Stanley Norris – of North Shore City. For services to athletics and the community.
- Professor Erik Newland Olssen – of Dunedin. For services to historical research.
- John Shotton Parker – of Blenheim. For services to painting.
- Professor John Greville Agard Pocock – of Baltimore, Maryland, United States. For services to the history of political thought.
- Professor Anthony Edmund Reeve – of Dunedin. For services to medical science.
- Barbara Joan Rocco – of Picton. For services to persons with disabilities.
- Richard George Scott – of Auckland. For services to historical research.
- Sylvia Grace Siddell – of Auckland. For services to painting.
- Greer Lascelles Twiss – of Auckland. For services to sculpture.
- Christiaan Willem Schmeil Van Kraayenoord – of Palmerston North. For services to agriculture and forestry.
- Peter James Vela – of Hamilton. For services to horse racing and the bloodstock industry.
- Peter Vere-Jones – of Paekākāriki. For services to acting and writing.
- Yvonne Mignon Willering – of Waitakere (West Auckland). For services to netball.

Additional

- Lieutenant Colonel Peter William Wood – Royal New Zealand Infantry Regiment.
- Acting Lieutenant Colonel James William Blackwell – Royal New Zealand Infantry Regiment.

Honorary

- Ambassador Paul Matthews Cleveland – of Virginia, United States. For services to United States of America–New Zealand relations.
- Dr Young-in Park – of Seoul, Republic of Korea. For services to Korea–New Zealand relations.
- Stanley Tan – of Singapore. For services to Singapore–New Zealand relations.
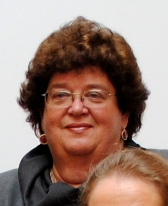
Judith Ablett-Kerr

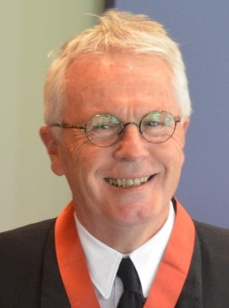
Mike Chunn

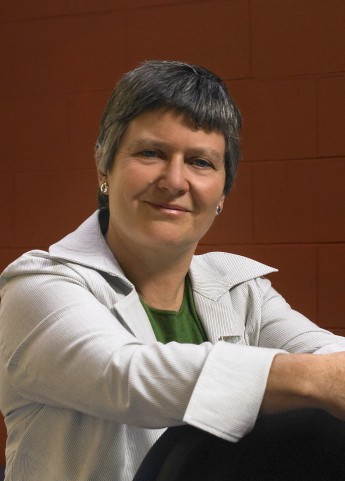
Jean Fleming

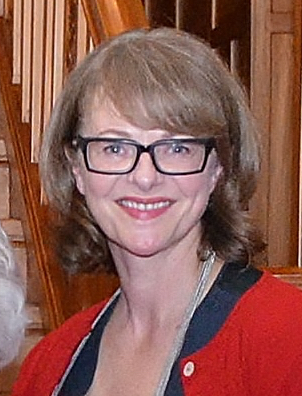
Miranda Harcourt

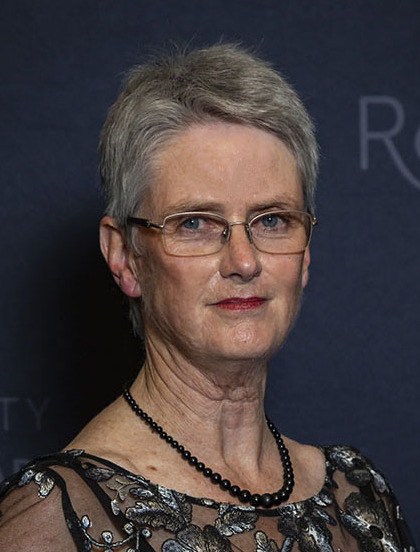
Jane Harding

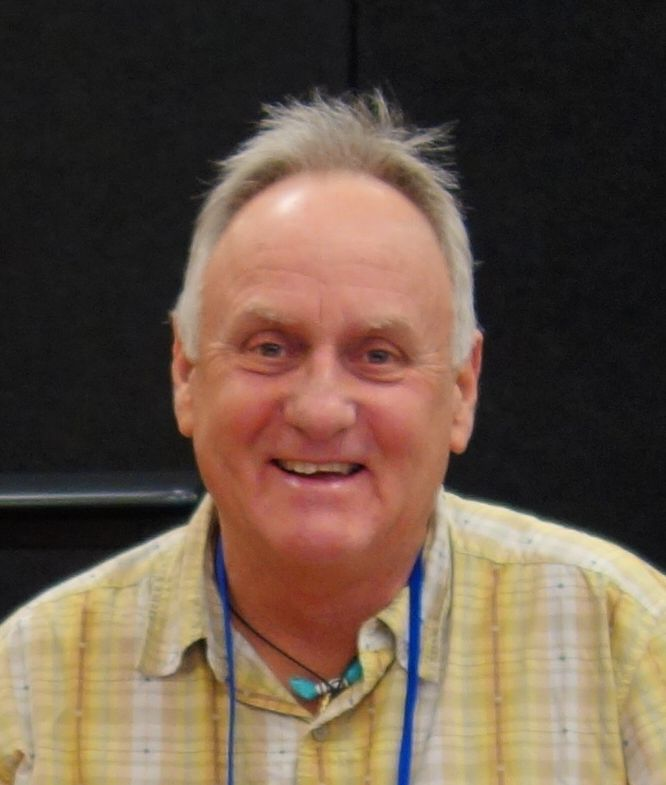
Mark Inglis

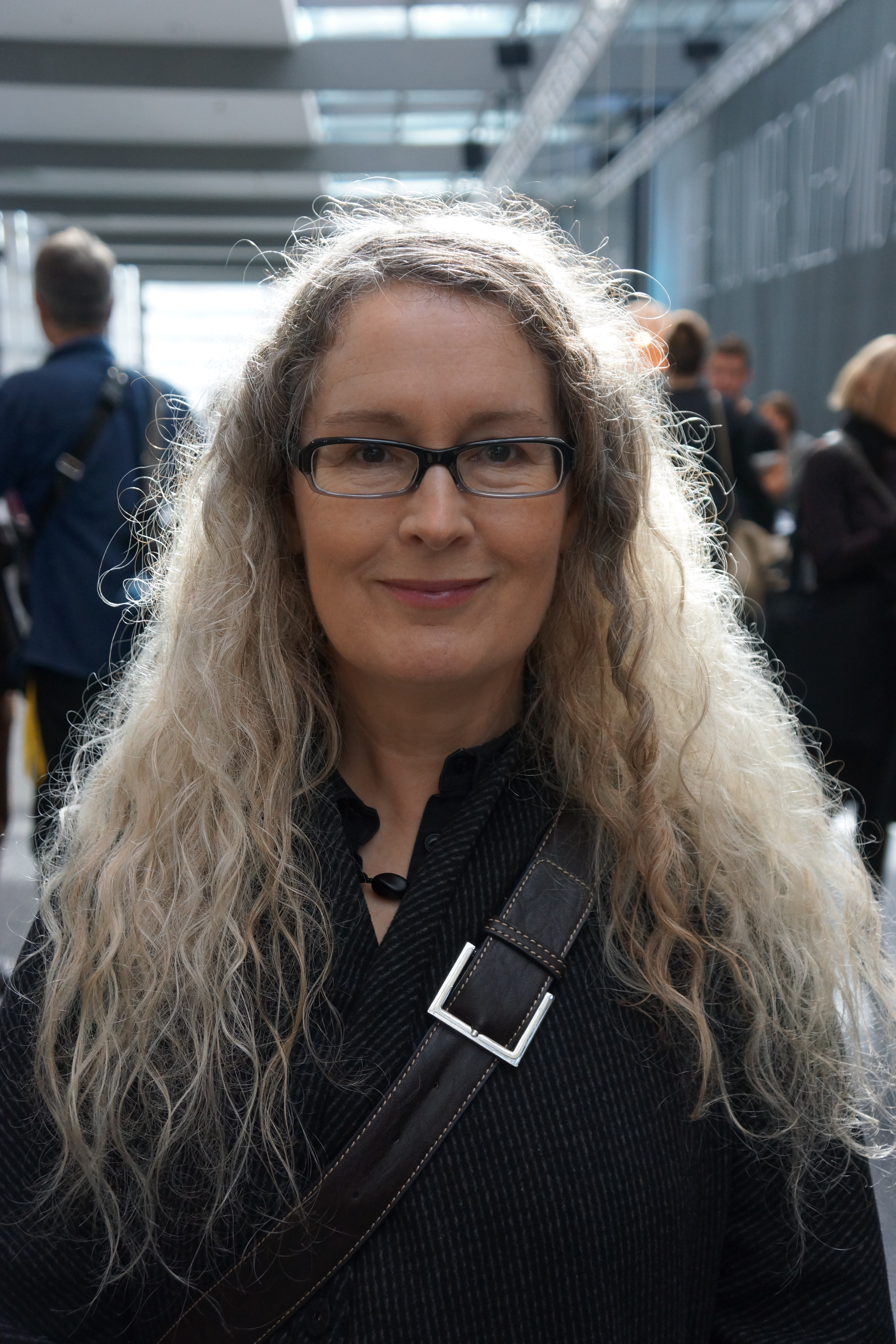
Elizabeth Knox

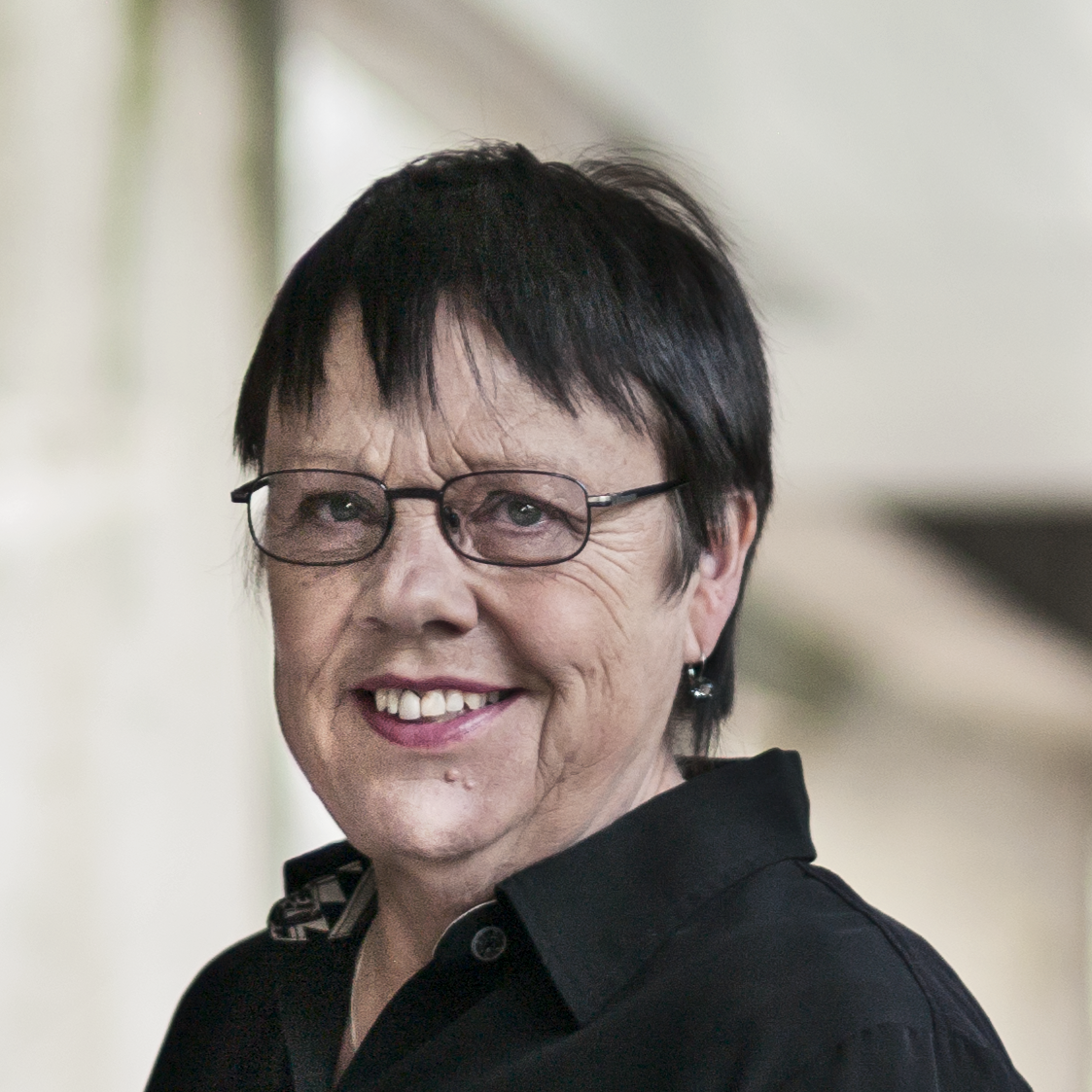
Robyn Munford

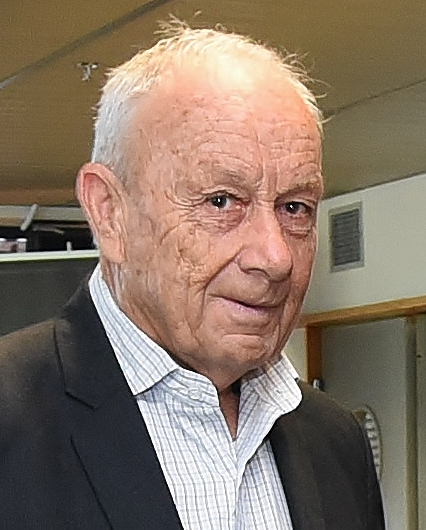
Dave Norris

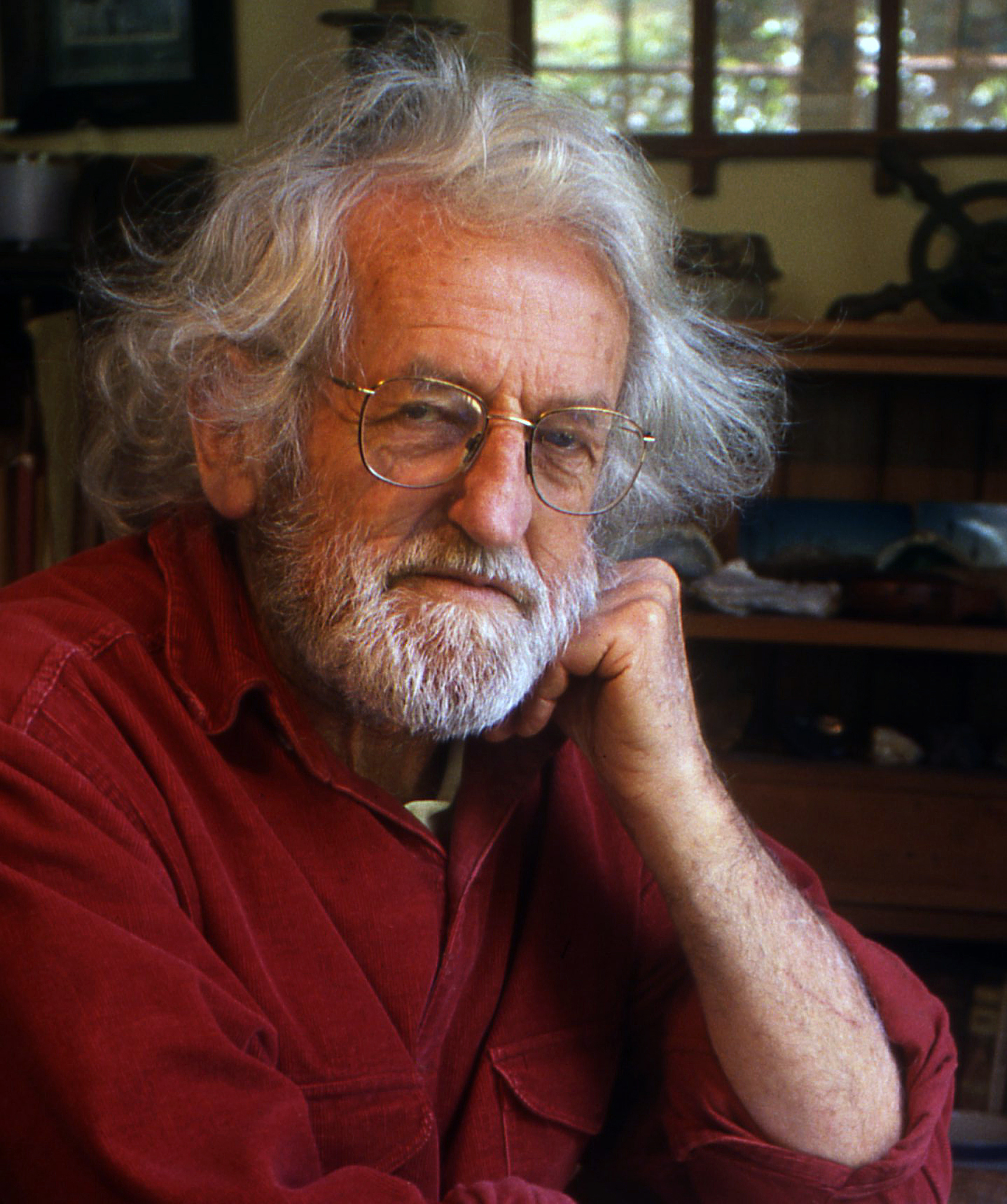
Dick Scott

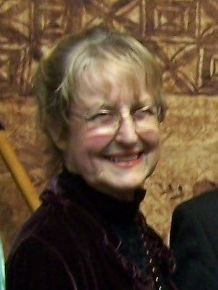
Sylvia Siddell

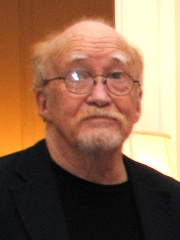
Greer Twiss

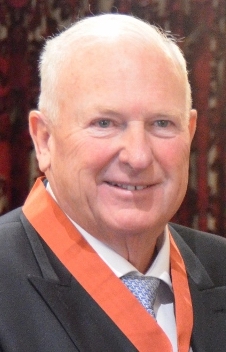
Peter Vela

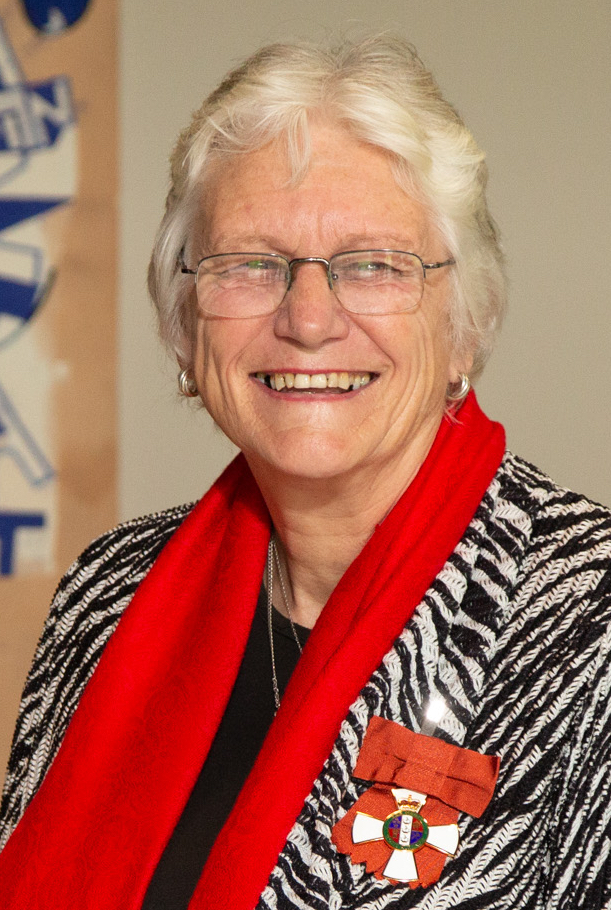
Yvonne Willering

=== Member (MNZM) ===
- Wing Commander John Richard Baddock – Royal New Zealand Air Force (Retired).
- Robyn Clare Bigelow – of Waitakere City. For services to the community.
- David Lory Blanchard – of Christchurch. For services to rugby league and the community.
- Paul Francis Brennan – of Paraparaumu Beach; inspector, New Zealand Police.
- Bub Bridger – of Granity. For services to literature.
- The Reverend John Dermot Buchanan – of Taupō. For services to the community.
- Stuart Duncan Buchanan – of Christchurch. For services to jazz and music education.
- John Campbell JP – of North Hokianga. For services to the community.
- Hilda Joyce Corrin – of Levin. For services to theatre.
- James Ronald Dart – of Auckland. For services to town planning.
- Ronald Charles Dick – of Dunedin. For services to the deaf.
- Elinor Elder – of Tauranga, For services to local body and community affairs.
- Dr Graham Charles Everitt – of Tauranga. For services to agricultural science.
- The Reverend Maurice Manawaroa Gray JP – of Christchurch. For services to Māori.
- Elizabeth Ailsa Grant Grimmer – of Waitakere City. For services to sport and the community.
- Peter Sedgley Hanan – of Morrinsville. For services to the community.
- Christopher Hawley – of Auckland. For services to international relations.
- Master Air Electronics Operator Peter Allan Hilliard – Royal New Zealand Air Force.
- Avelda Juanita Howie – of Clyde. For services to the community.
- Dr Rexley Blake Hunton – of Kerikeri. For services to public health.
- Graham James Iversen – of Auckland. For services to special needs children.
- Rhyl, Lady Jansen JP – of Orewa. For services to the community.
- Joseph Frederick Campbell Johnson – of Upper Hutt. For services to amateur radio.
- Warrant Officer Peter Wayne Johnson – Royal New Zealand Navy.
- Jennifer Norah Kirk – of North Shore City. For services to local-body and community affairs.
- Christine Beverley Knock – of Manukau City. For services to the community.
- Denise Ann L'Estrange-Corbet – of Auckland. For services to fashion design.
- Wesley Owen Lisle – of Papakura. For services to rugby league.
- William Stuart McIntosh JP – of Alexandra. For services to local-body and community affairs.
- Arthur Barry Magee – of Auckland. For services to sport.
- Wayne Ashley Mason – of Paekākāriki. For services to music.
- John Douglas Matheson – of Masterton. For services to business and the community.
- Thomas Joseph Mechen – of Palmerston North. For services to horticulture.
- (Victor) Ross Moore – of Porirua. For services to science administration.
- Lieutenant Commander David Lewis Mundy – Royal New Zealand Navy.
- Mavis Raylene Mullins – of Dannevirke. For services to the wool industry.
- Mereana Peka – of Ōtara. For services to the community.
- Anne Elizabeth Riddell – of Wellington. For services to children's health.
- Maxwell Greig Scott – of Dunedin. For services to sports journalism.
- Theresa Ruth (Terry) Scott JP – of Hamilton. For services to the community.
- Robert Graham Sinclair – of Christchurch. For services to business and the community.
- Donald Alexander Sloss – of Cheviot. For services to persons with disabilities and the community.
- Peter Stichbury – of Manurewa. For services to pottery.
- Paul Szentirmay – of Wellington. For services to librarianship and the Hungarian community.
- Miriama Kaiaha Tahi – of Te Kūiti. For services to the Māori community.
- Lawrence Edward Tall – of Invercargill. For services to cycling.
- Maaka Tauranga Tibble – of Gisborne. For services to persons with disabilities.
- Thomas Graeme Todd – of Nelson. For services to the community.
- Winifred Eleanor Todd – of Waimate. For services to the community.
- Henry Joseph Uttinger JP – of Mount Maunganui. For services to the community.
- Jean Agnes Vickridge JP – of Hamilton. For services to the community.
- Sandra Waddell – of Wellington. For services to persons with disabilities.

Additional

- Lieutenant Thomas John O'Reilly – New Zealand Intelligence Corps.
- Flying Officer Jade Ann Streeter – Royal New Zealand Air Force.
- Flight Sergeant Martyn Leigh Stacey – Royal New Zealand Air Force.
- Sergeant Trevor McLachlan – New Zealand Intelligence Corps.
- Corporal Damon Matthew O'Donnell – Royal New Zealand Army Medical Corps.
- Private Kane Kenneth McCollum – Royal New Zealand Army Medical Corps.
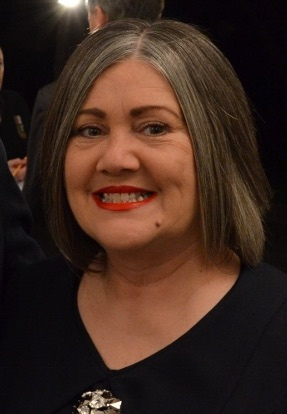
Denise L'Estrange-Corbet

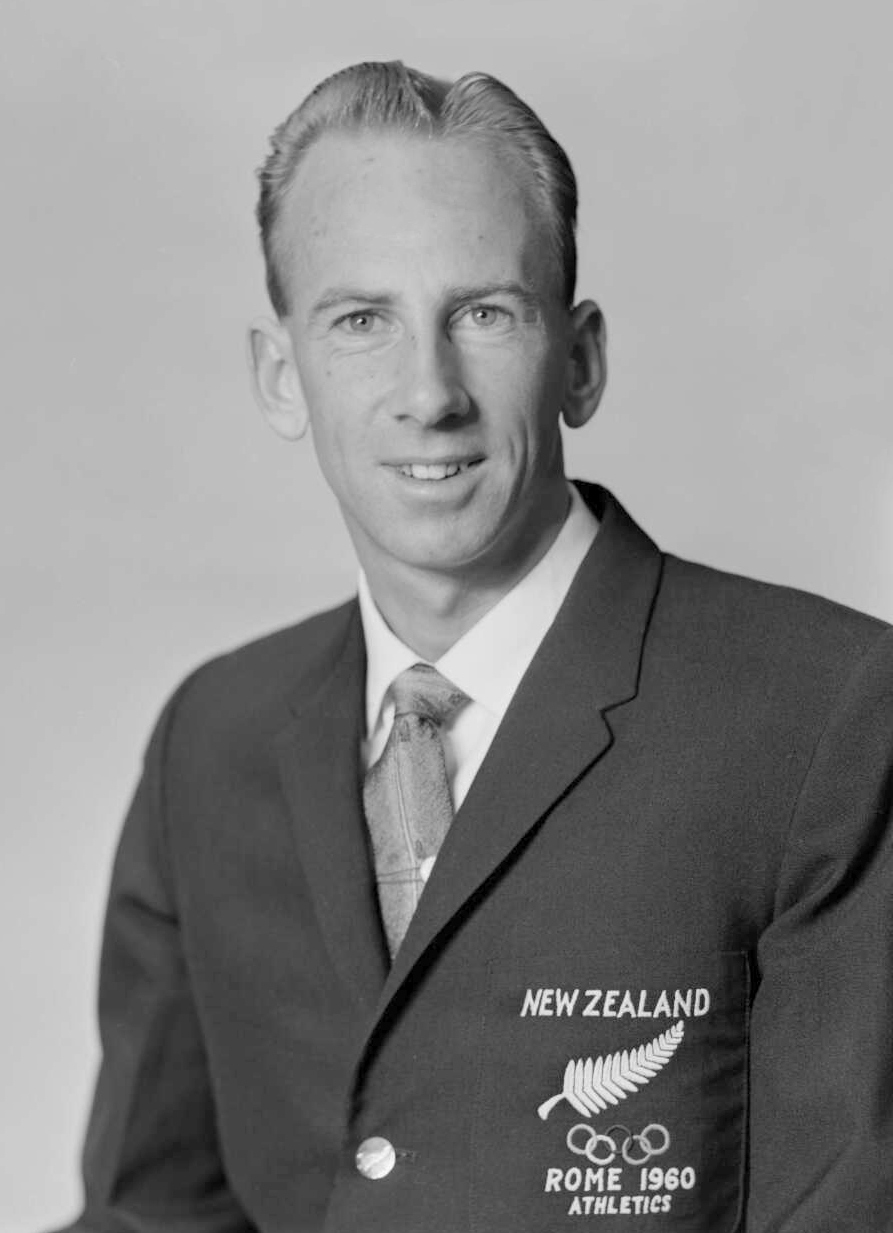
Barry Magee

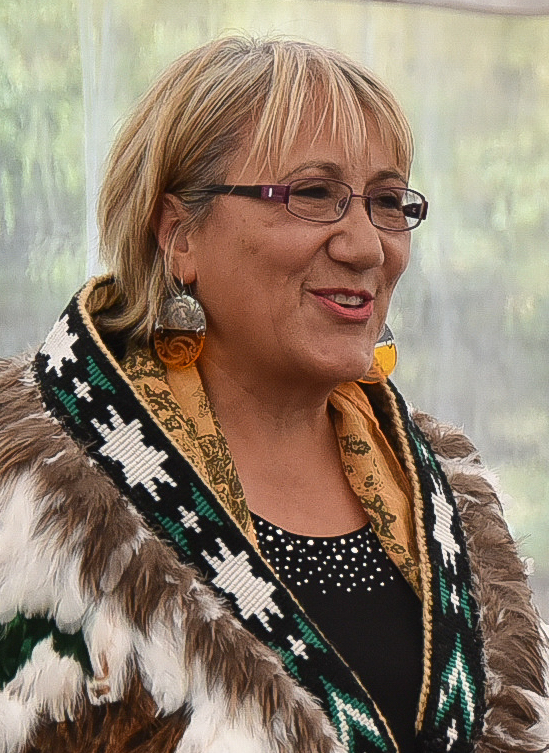
Mavis Mullins

== Companion of the Queen's Service Order (QSO) ==
=== For community service ===
- Catherine Anne Devereux – of Dunedin.
- Mere Arihi Te Huinga Edwards-Hema – of Gisborne.
- Derek Bowden Hayman – of Timaru.
- Elizabeth Ann (Betsy) Marshall – of Auckland.
- The Reverend Canon (William) David Morrell – of Christchurch.
- Abdul Rahim Rasheed – of Auckland.
- Daniel Puna Tumahai JP – of Auckland.

=== For public services ===
- Gerald David Gibb Bailey – of Hamilton.
- Mark Herbert Blumsky – of Wellington.
- Denise Frances Church – of Wellington.
- Waana Morrell Davis – of Lower Hutt.
- Robert Charles Francis MBE JP – of Masterton.
- The Reverend Dr Bruce Mervyn Hucker – of Auckland.
- Bruce Alexander Grenfell Murray – of Wellington.
- The Honourable Katherine Victoria O'Regan JP – of Te Awamutu.
- David Oughton – of Porirua.
- The Honourable Noel Scott – of Mount Maunganui.
- Arthur James (Jim) Sinclair JP – of Auckland.
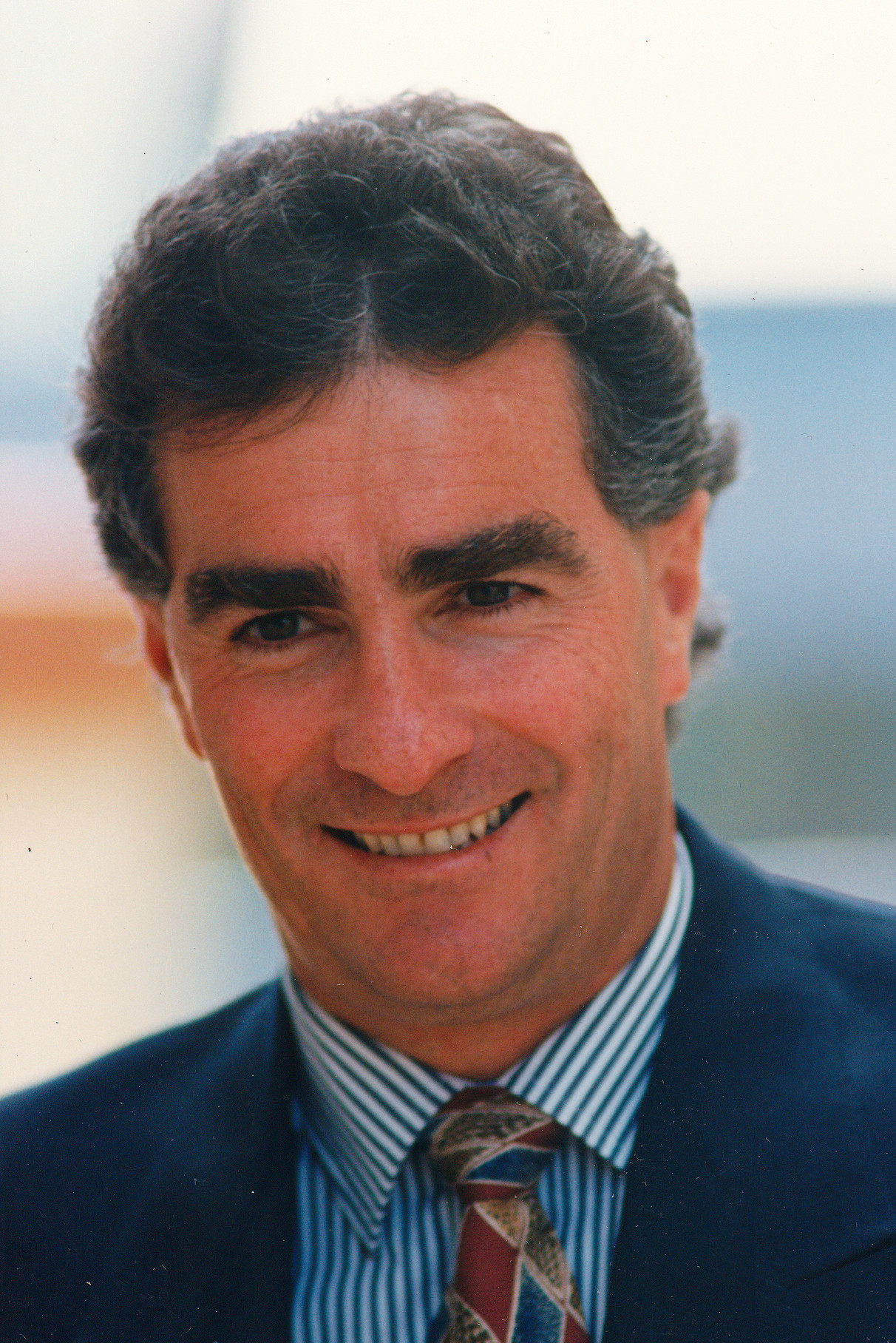
Mark Blumsky

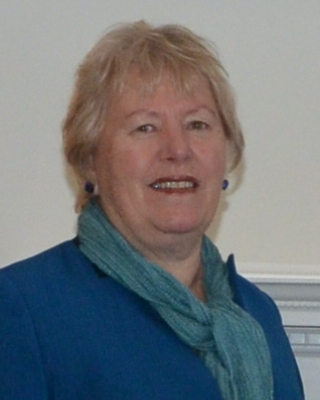
Denise Church

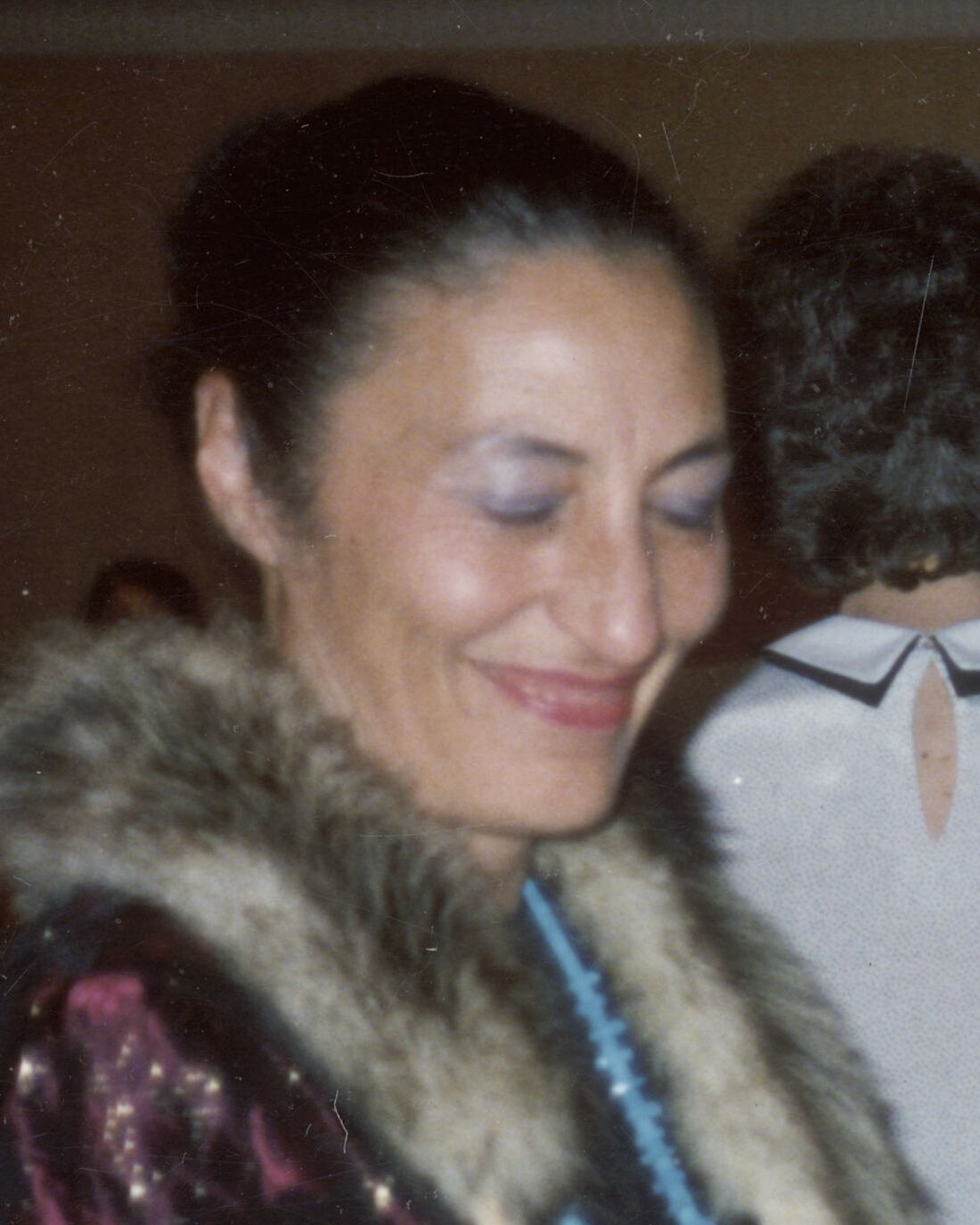
Waana Davis

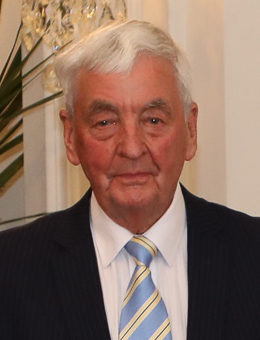
Bob Francis

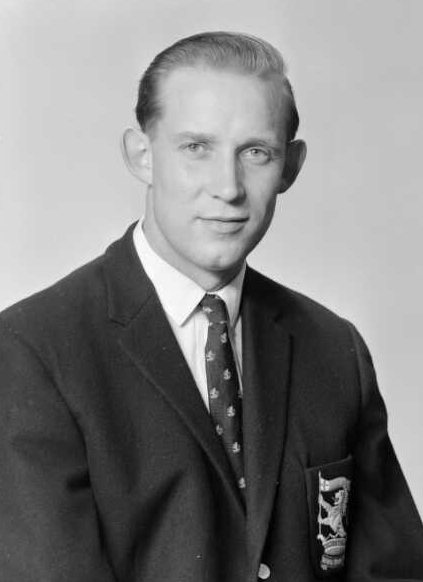
Bruce Murray

== Queen's Service Medal ==
=== For community service ===
- Frederick Keith Adams – of New Plymouth.
- Lois Audrey Burnley – of Wainuiomata.
- Ellen Barbara Cecile Butterworth – of Ōpōtiki.
- Hugh James Cook – of Picton.
- Waltherus Nicolaas Gerardus Antonius de Bont – of Taupō.
- Charles Ding JP – of Wellington.
- Helen Hoi Lun Ding – of Wellington.
- Jane Louise Edgar – of Auckland.
- Leslie Arthur Green – of Dunedin.
- Niranjan Singh Grewal JP – of Manukau City.
- Edward William Guy – of Waharoa.
- Jeanette Claire Hastie – of Mount Maunganui.
- Frances Joan Howard – of Motueka.
- Sophie Ropina Keefe – of Wellington.
- Audrey Elizabeth Larsen – of Kaikorai, Dunedin.
- The Reverend John Victor Lill AE JP – of Kerikeri.
- John Brian McCarthy – of Hokitika.
- Ellen May Eva McCormack – of Tauranga.
- Emora Magatogia – of Auckland.
- Hana Morrison – of Rotorua.
- Valerie Elsie Murray – of Auckland.
- Douglas Charles Nelmes – of Christchurch.
- Brenda Kay Ormsby – of Rotorua.
- Stanley Arthur Thomas Potter – of Christchurch.
- Mei Ngaronoa Rawiri – of Waimamaku.
- Maxwell Bruce Rolston JP – of Rotorua.
- The Reverend Leao Tinitali Si'Itia – of Auckland.
- Garry Raymond Snelgrove – of Wainuiomata.
- Kararaina Te Wera Taite – of Palmerston North.
- Kanti Lakha Vasan JP – of Wellington.
- Murray Walter – of Te Awamutu.
- Marama Rosina Whaiapu – of Manukau City.
- David Roland Winstanley – of Blenheim.
- Enid Frances Wordsworth – of Tauranga.
- David Andrew Young – of Dunedin.

=== For public services ===
- Kathleen Anne Adams – of Kaiapoi.
- Neil Leonard Adams – of Auckland; inspector, New Zealand Police.
- Letele Amani JP – of Auckland.
- Charles Patrick Gordon Baker – of Kawerau.
- Genevieve Frances Becroft – of North Shore City.
- George Frederick Bissett – of Auckland.
- Dr Andrew Hamilton Buchanan – of Christchurch.
- Graeme Bernard Carley – of Auckland.
- Kathryn Joy Cox – of Blackball.
- Clyde Rodney Cunningham – of Napier; senior station officer, Napier Volunteer Unit, New Zealand Fire Service.
- Jack Warwick De Vere JP – of Waitakere City.
- Neiel Winston Drain – of Christchurch.
- Tania Marion Eden – of Porirua; inspector, New Zealand Police.
- Barry David Fisher – of Taumarunui; chief fire officer, Taumarunui Volunteer Fire Brigade, New Zealand Fire Service.
- John Gallocher – of Paraparaumu.
- Leslie Ritchie Gibson – of Wellington.
- Ana Gillet JP – of Invercargill.
- Bruce Hutton – of Porirua; senior constable, New Zealand Police.
- Riripeti Hera Joyce – of Papakura.
- Lyla Bernice Koppen – of Takapau.
- Colin Stanley McGregor – of Kerikeri.
- William Porteous McKerrow JP – of Oamaru.
- Annabel Marie McLaren – of Ōtaki.
- Noeline Matthews – of Lower Hutt.
- Thomas Joseph Muir – of Hamilton.
- Dr Allan David Nichols – of Porirua.
- Tania Pearle Pari – of Rotorua.
- Laurence Arthur Comyn Pigou – of Blenheim.
- Michael Edwin Porter – of Blenheim; sergeant, New Zealand Police.
- Eva Rawnsley – of Paekākāriki.
- Joan Roche – of Invercargill.
- David William Ryan – of Waitakere City; senior sergeant, New Zealand Police.
- Graham Robert Thorp – of Taradale.
- Karl Leonard Tuinukuafe JP – of Auckland.
- Clarence Vivian Wills – of Auckland.
- Maurice Te Pouri Wilson – of Manukau City.
