= Jackie Sanders =

New Zealand social work researcher (born 1959)

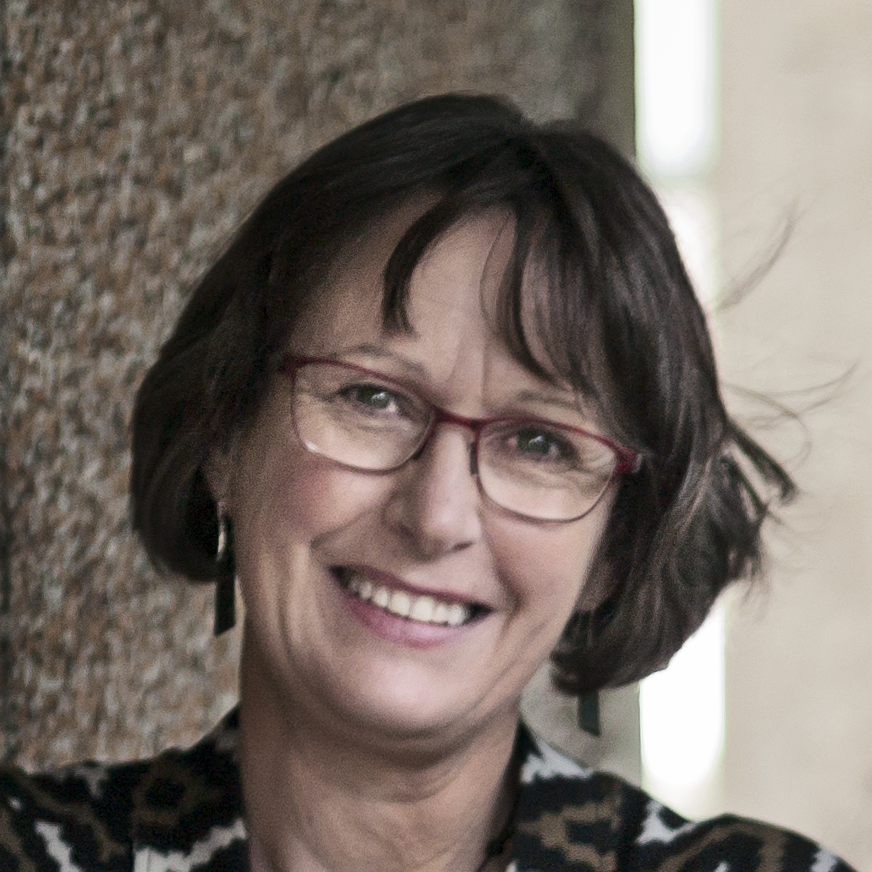
- Born: 1959 (age 66–67)
- Education: Massey University
- Scientific career
- Workplaces: Massey University
- Thesis: Subject child : the everyday experiences of a group of small town Aotearoa/New Zealand children (2004)

Jacqueline Ruth Sanders (born 1959) is a New Zealand social work academic, and professor in the School of Social Work at Massey University.

== Academic career ==
Sanders completed her MA at Massey in 1984, and then spent 20 years working in health and social service planning and management. After graduating with a 2004 PhD titled Subject child : the everyday experiences of a group of small town Aotearoa/New Zealand children at Massey University, Sanders joined the School of Social Work, where she is a Professor of Children's and Youth Studies. She is Director of the Children, Youth, and Families Research Project.

== Research ==
Sanders' research is on families and community, specifically on how to ensure children and young people get the best start in life. Several recent research projects, including Pathways to Resilience (funded by MBIE), and the Long-term Successful Youth Transitions Study (LtSYT), conducted with her Massey colleague Robyn Munford. LtSYT examines the major transitions in the lives of high-risk young people between the ages of 13 and 17 – leaving school, higher education, employment, independence, and establishing an identity – and looks at the pathways that led to resilience and how those could be supported. This 10-year longitudinal study is due to finish in 2022. Sanders also studies social service delivery, and the development of new models of social work practice.

As part of the Youth Transitions Project, Munford and Sanders created an online tool, the PARTH model, for people working with vulnerable youth. Based on 107 detailed case studies from 593 participant, the model is designed to help youth workers make better decisions, and builds on a similar international study led by Michael Ungar at Dalhousie University. Munford and Sanders have also prepared guidelines for employers working with young people, particularly helping them transition into work.

== Selected works ==
- Sanders, Jackie, Mike O’Brien, Margaret Tennant, S. Wojciech Sokolowski, and Lester M. Salamon. "The New Zealand non-profit sector in comparative perspective." Wellington: Office for the Community and Voluntary Sector (2008).
- Tennant, Margaret, Mike O'Brien, and Jackie Sanders. The history of the non-profit sector in New Zealand. Wellington: Office for the Community and Voluntary Sector, 2008.
- Sanders, Jackie; Munford, Robyn; Thimasarn-Anwar, Tewaporn; Liebenberg, Linda; Ungar, Michael (2015). "The role of positive youth development practices in building resilience and enhancing wellbeing for at-risk youth". Child Abuse & Neglect. 42: 40–53. doi:10.1016/j.chiabu.2015.02.006. PMID 25770347.
- Sanders, Jackie; Munford, Robyn (2008). "Losing self to the future? Young women's strategic responses to adulthood transitions". Journal of Youth Studies. 11 (3): 331–346. doi:10.1080/13676260801946480. S2CID 145141951.
- Munford, Robyn; Sanders, Jackie (1999). Supporting families. Palmerston North, N.Z.: Dunmore Press. ISBN 0-86469-337-0. OCLC 44881694.
- Tennant, Margaret, Jackie Sanders, Michael O’Brien, and Charlotte Castle. Defining the nonprofit sector: New Zealand. Johns Hopkins Center for Civil Society Studies, 1998.
