= Michael Ungar =

Michael Ungar (born June 18, 1963, in Montreal, Canada) is a researcher in the field of social and psychological resilience and is Principal Investigator for the Resilience Research Centre at Dalhousie University, in Halifax, Canada, where he is a professor at the School of Social Work, a post that he has held since 2001. He completed his MSW at McGill University in 1988 and his Ph.D. in Social Work at Wilfrid Laurier University in 1995.

== Career ==
Ungar works in the field of resilience research across cultures and the translation of that knowledge to clinical settings.

He is the author of three books on parenting and six academic texts used in the fields of social work and counselling. His parenting books include The We Generation: Raising Socially Responsible Kids, and Too Safe for Their Own Good: How Risk and Responsibility Help Teens Thrive. His academic texts include Counseling in Challenging Contexts: Working with Individuals and Families Across Clinical and Community Settings and Strengths-based Counseling with At-risk Youth. His books on resilience include Nurturing Hidden Resilience in Troubled Youth, the edited volume Resilience in Action, and the Handbook for Working with Children and Youth: Pathways to Resilience Across Cultures and Contexts.

== Awards and positions ==
Dr. Ungar was the 2012 recipient of the Canadian Association of Social Workers National Distinguished Service Award.

Ungar won the Canadian Association of Social Workers Distinguished Service Award for Nova Scotia in 2010.

He is a board member of the American Family Therapy Academy, a Clinical Supervisor with the American Association for Marriage and Family Therapy, and since 2002, has sat on the Board of Examiners of the Nova Scotia Association of Social Workers.

== Books ==
- Ungar, M. (2019). Change Your World: The Science of Resilience and the True Path to Success. Toronto, ON: Sutherland House. ISBN 978-1-9994395-2-1
- Ungar, M. (2015). I Still Love You: Nine Things Troubled Kids Need from Their Parents. Toronto, ON: Dundern. ISBN 978-1-4597-2983-4
- Ungar, M. (2015). Working with Children and Youth with Complex Needs: 20 Skills to Build Resilience. New York, NY: Routledge. ISBN 978-1-138-80073-1
- Theron, L., Liebenberg, L., & Ungar, M. et al. (2015) Youth Resilience and Culture: Commonalities and Complexities. New York, NY: Springer. ISBN 978-94-017-9414-5
- Ungar, M., ed. (2012). The Social Ecology of Resilience: A Handbook of Theory and Practice. New York, NY: Springer. ISBN 978-1-4614-0585-6
- Ungar, M. (2011). The Social Worker: A Novel. Lawrencetown Beach, NS: Pottersfield Press at Smashwords. ISBN 978-1-897426-26-5
- Ungar, M. (2011). Counseling in challenging contexts: Working with individuals and families across clinical and community settings. Belmont, CA: Brooks/Cole. ISBN 0-8400-3184-X
- Liebenberg, L. & Ungar, M. (Eds) (2009). Researching resilience. Toronto, ON: University of Toronto Press. ISBN 0-8020-9470-8
- Ungar, M. (2009). The We Generation: Raising socially responsible kids. Toronto, ON: McClelland and Stewart. ISBN 0-7382-1378-0
- Ungar, M. & Lerner, R. (Eds.) (2008). Special Issue: Resilience and positive development across the life span. Research in Human Development, 5(3).
- Campbell, C. & Ungar, M. (2008). The decade after high school: A professional's guide. Toronto, ON: The Canadian Education and Research Institute for Counselling.
- Campbell, C., Ungar, M. & Dutton, P. (2008). The decade after high school: A parent's guide. Toronto, ON: The Canadian Education and Research Institute for Counselling.
- Carrey, N. & Ungar, M. (Eds) (2007). Resilience. Monograph for the Child and Adolescent Psychiatric Clinics of North America, Vol. 16(2).
- Liebenberg, L. & Ungar, M. (Eds) (2008). Resilience in action. Toronto, ON: University of Toronto Press. ISBN 0-8020-9269-1
- Ungar, M. (2007). Too safe for their own good. Toronto, ON: McClelland and Stewart. ISBN 0-7710-8708-X
- Ungar, M. (2007). Playing at being bad: The hidden resilience of troubled teens. Toronto, ON: McClelland and Stewart. ISBN 0-7710-8711-X
- Ungar, M. (2006). Strengths-based counseling for at-risk youth. Thousand Oaks, CA: Corwin Press. ISBN 1-4129-2819-2
- Ungar, M. (Ed.) (2005). Handbook for working with children and youth: Pathways to resilience across cultures and contexts. Thousand Oaks, CA: Sage Publications. ISBN 1-4129-0405-6
- Ungar, M. (2004). Nurturing hidden resilience in troubled youth. Toronto, ON: University of Toronto Press. ISBN 0-8020-8565-2
