= University of Otago Faculty of Dentistry =

Dental school in New Zealand

Coordinates: 45°52′4″S 170°30′31″E

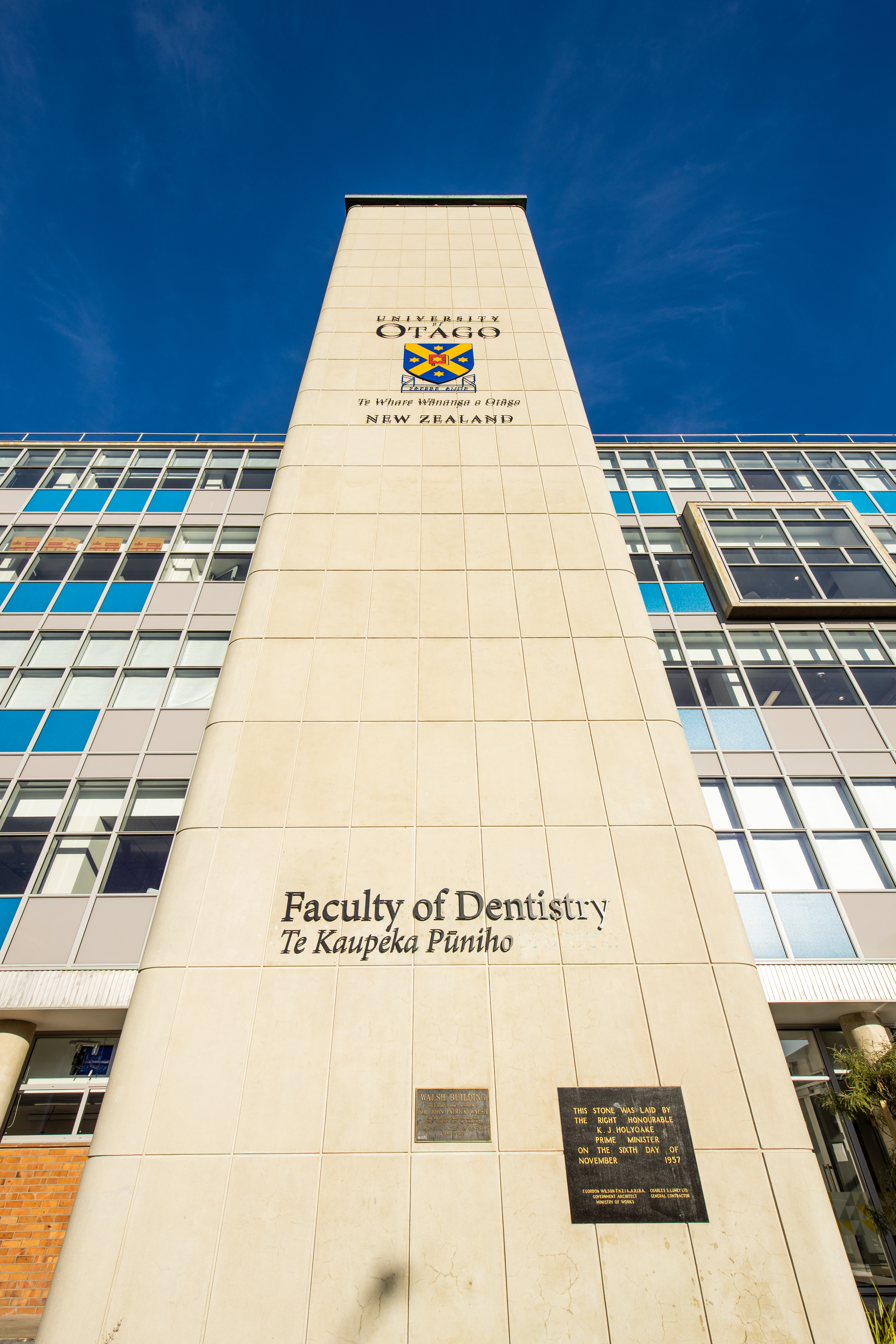
- Type: Public university
- Established: 1907
- Parent institution: University of Otago
- Dean: Paul Cooper
- Location: 310 Great King Street, North Dunedin, New Zealand
- Website: https://www.otago.ac.nz/dentistry/

The University of Otago Faculty of Dentistry is one of the faculties of the University of Otago. Founded in 1907, the Faculty of Dentistry houses the only dental school in New Zealand. It is part of the Division of Health Sciences within the university. It offers courses in dentistry, oral health therapy (formerly dental hygiene and dental therapy), and dental technology. In addition to the undergraduate dental programmes, Otago offers specialty postgraduate training programmes such as the Doctor of Clinical Dentistry (DClinDent) degree, and research degrees including PhD. The Faculty's main buildings in Dunedin are the heritage-registered Walsh Building and the Clinical Services Building, built in 2019. A clinical facility in Manurewa, Auckland, opened in 2021. The Sir John Walsh Research Institute, established in 2007, conducts research on clinical dentistry, dental technology and oral health.

== History ==
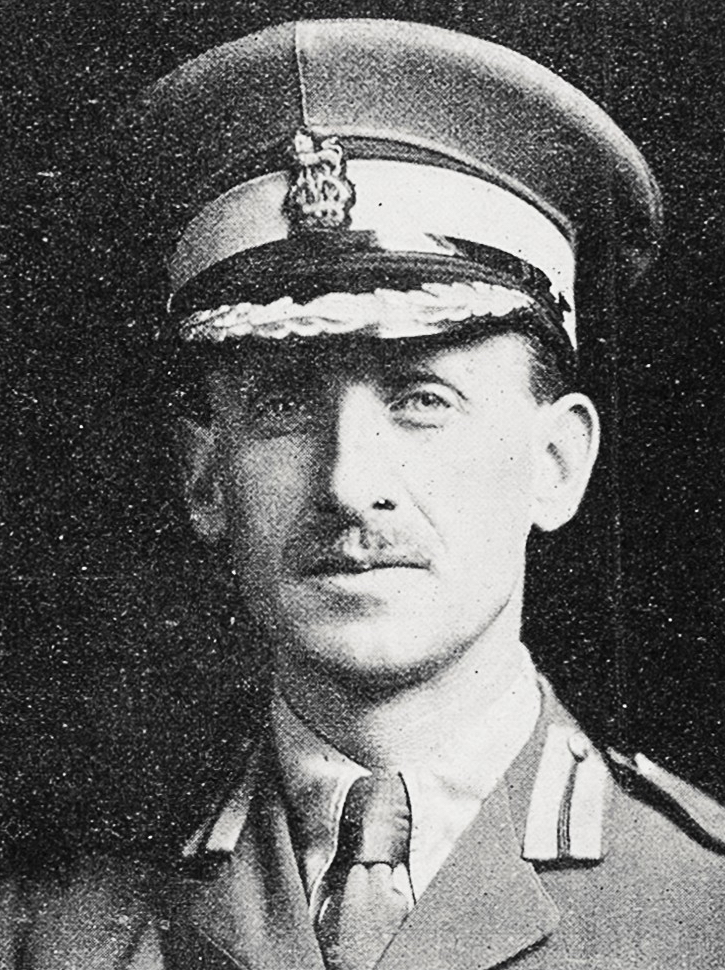
Percy Pickerill, first dean of the Dental School

The Dental School was opened in 1907 in Dunedin. Dentistry in New Zealand took steps towards professionalisation after the 1880 Dentists' Act required the registration of all New Zealand dentists. Another Act in 1904 placed the education of dentists under the control of the University of New Zealand. This provided the impetus for the University of New Zealand to establish a dental school, and it was considered desirable for it to be co-located with what was, at that time, the country's only medical school. Premier Richard Seddon had to be persuaded against locating it in Auckland, however, by claims that the cooler Dunedin climate was more suitable for studying. In 1905, a professional association, the New Zealand Dental Association, was set up, and was followed by a "flurry of activity" to establish university training for dentists, as the legal provisions allowing the registration of existing dentists ended in 1910.

When the school opened in July 1907, local dentist Owen Davies, a graduate of the Melbourne Dental School, was appointed as acting director until the arrival of the inaugural 28 year-old dean, Henry Percy Pickerill (known as Percy), from England in September. Davies was assisted by 12 honorary dental surgeons.

The School conducted "1480 operations of all kinds" on 438 patients in its first year, despite having only six chairs. Three students enrolled for the Bachelor of Dental Surgery degree, graduating in 1911, including Charles Hercus, and seven registered dentists undertook training. Over the following few years, the School struggled to attract students, with some people considering the degree course "too long and difficult". Legal changes were also made that extended the period of registration for dentists trained under apprenticeships, and allowed other means of entering the profession, further discouraging student enrolments. A shorter certificate course was introduced in 1917, and the Dental Association and politician TK Sidey set up bursaries, so that by 1919 the School was enrolling 42 students per year. In 1926, the school moved into a new building, having outgrown the previous school.

During the 1930s, enrolments continued to grow and the Dental School had more than 120 students by the end of the decade. A course on orthodontics was introduced in 1926, under associate professor Reid Burt. From 1929, a mechanical dentistry course lasting 18 months was offered for students aiming to be dental laboratory assistants, but it ceased in 1942. In 1943, the certificate course was abolished, and beginning in 1945 the dental students completed the same intermediate year as medical students before four years of professional training. During the 1940s, the number of students enrolled in the school reached 200, and the campaign for a third new building was begun.

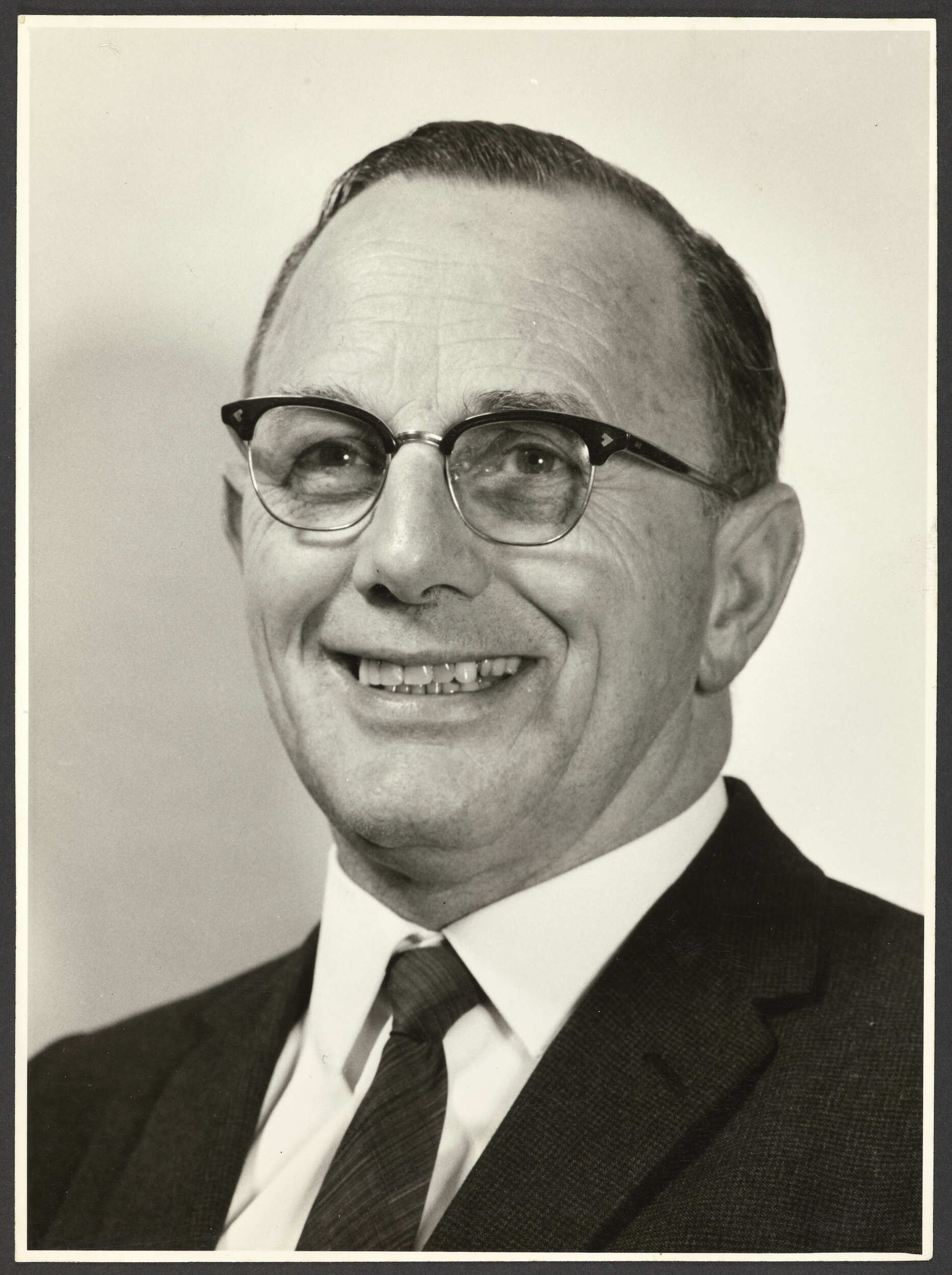
John Walsh, dean of the school from 1946 to 1971

The entry of students to second year was limited for the first time in 1947, after a rise in applications following the end of the Second World War placed pressure on strained resources and staff. From 1950, all dentists have been required to hold a full dental degree rather than a certificate of proficiency in order to practise. The post-professional stage has seen an increase in specialisation and research activities. In 1963, the intake of dental students rose from 50 to 60 per annum.

In the 1990s the faculty expanded to include education for all dental health practitioners. Faculty member periodontist Angela Pack advocated for the introduction of dental hygienists in New Zealand, chairing a committee set up by the New Zealand Dental Association to develop a curriculum for hygienist training. Despite the Dental Council approval of the curriculum, the dean of the dental school, Martin Kean, would not allow their training at the university. From 1995, training for hygienists was carried out by the Otago Polytechnic. Up to this point, dental technicians had trained in Upper Hutt and dental therapists in Wellington. As dean from 1992, Peter Innes expanded the school to take over the dental hygienist training, as well as education of other dental health practitioners, despite resistance from the Dental Association Board. Training was offered from 1999 in the form of one- or two-year diplomas, available in clinical dental technology, dental therapy, and dental hygiene. In 2001, a dental technology degree was introduced, and in the early 2000s the diplomas were phased out in favour of the Bachelor of Oral Health degree. Postgraduate qualifications were introduced for dental specialties, and some Masters of Dental Surgery were upgraded to a Doctor of Clinical Dentistry. In 2022, the School was training around 100 dentists, 50 oral health therapists and 30 dental technicians each year.

The first woman graduates of the Dental School were Miranda Whiteside, who completed the certificate in 1922, and Malvena Oldham, who graduated with a BDS in 1923. Oldham then became the first woman dentistry teacher in 1924. When Angela Pack joined the school in 1972 as a lecturer, she was the only woman teaching clinical dentistry. In 1973 only 2.5% of registered dentists in New Zealand were women. The proportion of women gradually increased to the point that the Dental Faculty were concerned about the possible impacts on the profession of women leaving to get married or have children. Pack was asked to research the issue, and presented a paper at the 1981 NZ Dental Association conference. She described many cases of discrimination against women from their male colleagues, and published papers on the treatment of women dentists. Bernadette Drummond, a graduate of the school, became New Zealand's first female professor of dentistry in 2012.

The first Māori dental student was Waaka (Walker) Morete, who graduated with a Bachelor of Dental Surgery in 1928, but Māori student enrolments after this were very low. John Broughton, appointed as a lecturer in Māori health in 1982, researched indigenous dental health around the world, and completed a PhD on using kaupapa Māori methodology for the provision of Māori dental care. Broughton introduced clinics to improve Māori access to dental treatment, developing them into teaching clinics treating children from local kura kaupapa. Broughton also initiated a scheme for students to volunteer providing dental care for mothers and babies in Rotorua, where they were housed by the local community, and then expanded the programme to include trips to the Pacific Islands. In 2011 Broughton and then-dean Gregory Seymour introduced the first outplacements for dental students, as five-week placements in Māori dental health practices, giving supervised care to patients and learning and experiencing Māori cultural frameworks. These placements were cancelled during COVID-19 pandemic and have not returned.

== Deans ==
The inaugural dean of the school was Percy Pickerill, who had medicine and dentistry degrees, and served for twenty years from 1907. Pickerill was a renowned plastic surgeon, and left to pursue this career in 1927. His replacement Robert Bevan Dodds served until 1945, and the school was proud to have its first director who was a graduate of the School. Dodds was replaced by Sir John Walsh. Walsh is remembered for his advocacy for fluoridating New Zealand's water supply, and for the invention of the high-speed dental drill. He was also instrumental in retaining the dental school in Dunedin, during a period when the Government was considering relocating it to Auckland. After Walsh's retirement in 1971, American orthodontist Ernest Hixon served as dean for one year, but was killed in a car crash when attending a conference in Buenos Aires, Argentina. John Le Bailly Warren served from 1972 to 1978. Martin R. Kean was dean until 1991, followed by Peter B. Innes (1992–2006), Gregory J. Seymour (2006–2012), Paul A. Brunton (2014–2019) and Michael V. Morgan (2019–2022). The dean since 2022 is Paul R. Cooper.

== Facilities ==
=== First building ===
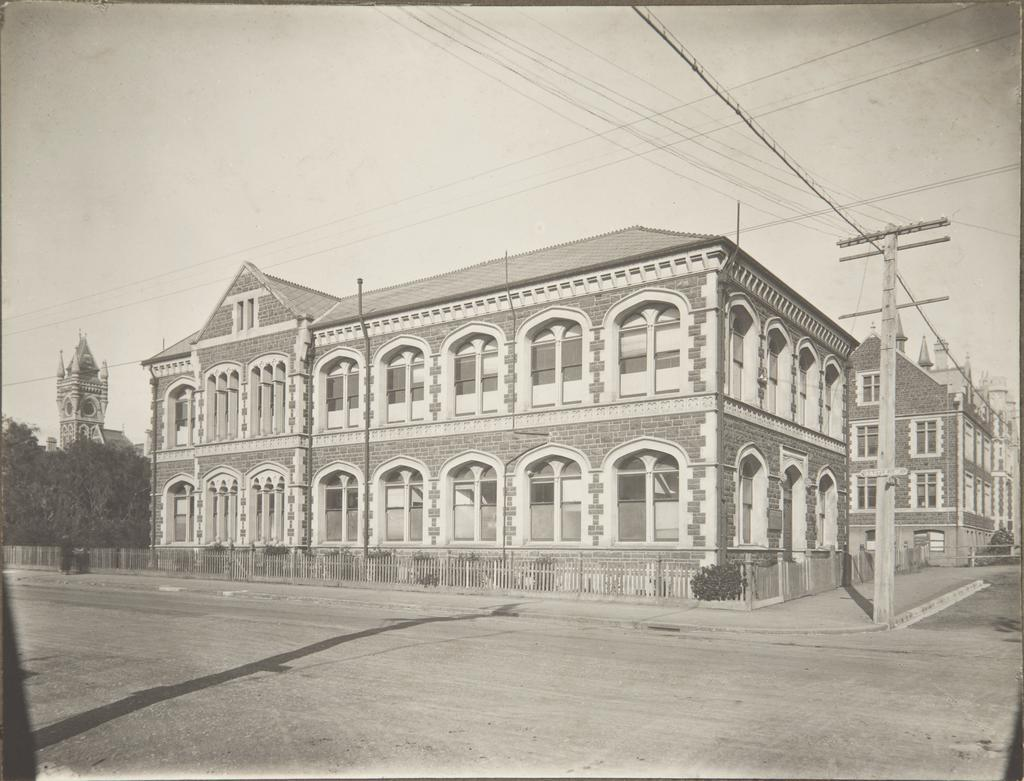
The first dental school building, photographed in 1919, is now the University Staff Club.

The first dental school building at 80 Union Place was designed by architect James Louis Salmond, and officially opened in 1908, funded by £1000 raised by the New Zealand Dental Association, and £1,500 from the government. The stone building was considered "commodious and well-fitted", with a ground-floor waiting area, examination rooms, anaesthetic department, mechanical laboratory, and an upstairs restoration clinic, museum and lecture room. The building was designed to hold 25 students, but by 1923 accommodated over 100 students, and the school was experiencing high demand from patients. The university architects added a two storey extension, and a separate single-storey extension housing a mechanical room, a student common room and a dark room. A 15 year-old boy died in the overcrowded waiting room in 1922, and in 1923 flooding of the Leith washed away the single-storey extension, and part of the land underneath the other extension. The school moved into a new building on Great King Street, the Marples Building, in 1926. The first dental school building then became the university registry, then the Law School, and now survives as the university's staff club. The building was registered as a Category 1 Heritage New Zealand building in July 1988, due to its contribution to the Gothic-revival university complex.

=== Marples Building ===
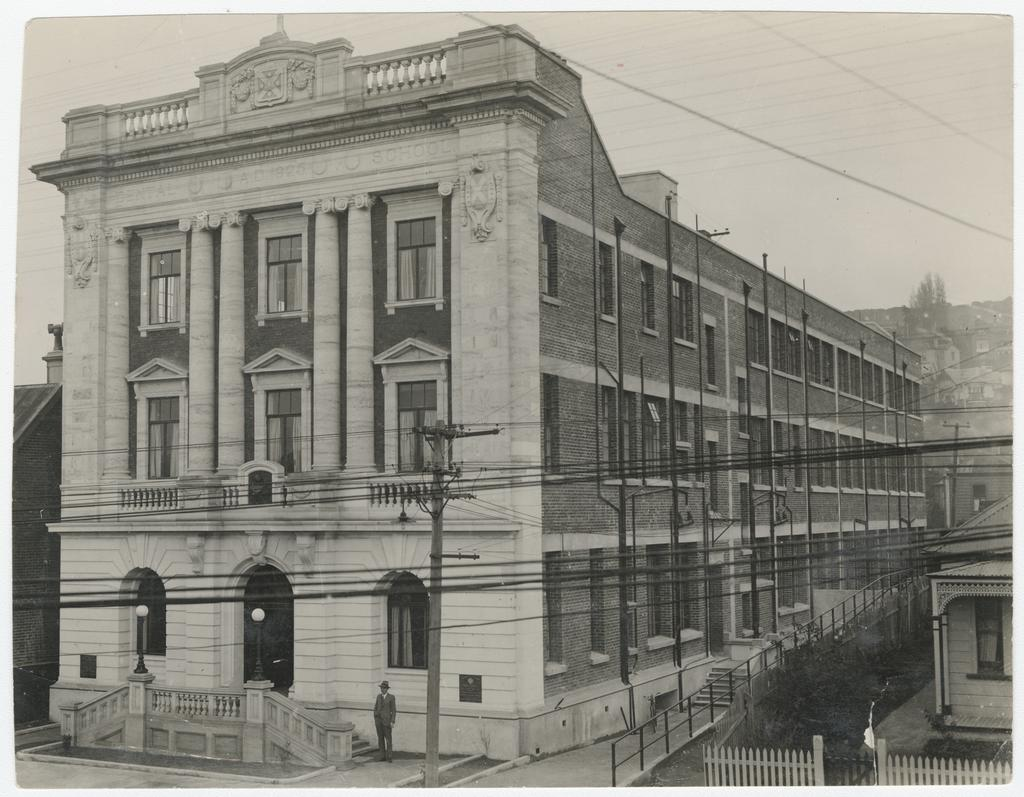
The second dental school building, opened in 1926, is now the Department of Zoology.

The second building was constructed on Great King Street, next to the current site, at a cost of £25,000. It opened in 1926, and was later named the Marples Building after zoologist Professor Brian Marples. The building was designed to be long and narrow by architect Edmund Anscombe, to make the most of the natural light. The building was designed for 80 to 100 students, and had a clinic running the length of the second floor. There were also prosthetic and technical laboratories, an operating theatre, X-ray room, and museum and library facilities. However the school quickly outgrew the Marples Building, and by 1946 John Walsh, dean of the school, had begun a campaign for a replacement. Total student enrolments had reach 200 during the 1940s but delays due to Government priorities, funding and labour shortages meant construction of the replacement building (the Walsh building) did not begin until 1956.

=== Walsh Building ===
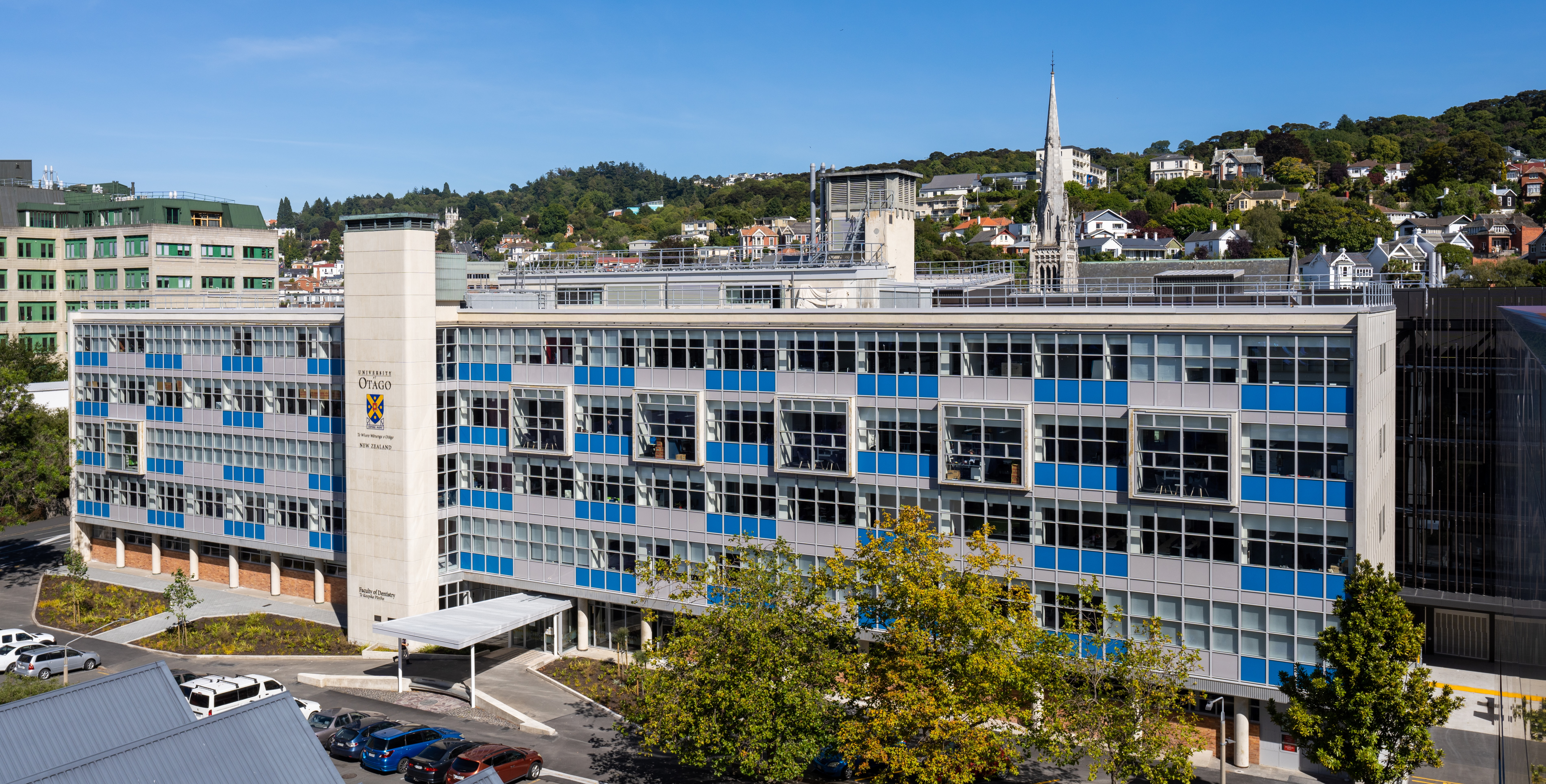
The Walsh Building in 2021. The Clinical Services Building can just be seen to the right, behind the Walsh Building.

The third dental school was built on a site adjacent to the Marples building, which then became the Department of Zoology. The third building was later named the Walsh Building after dean John Walsh. Construction started in 1956 and the building was officially opened in 1961 by the minister of education, Blair Tennent, who had himself graduated with a BDS from the school in 1922. The five-storey building was designed to accommodate 250 students, and to allow for treatment of around 300 patients per day, in a clinic with 60 chairs. By the 1980s, the building was extended through the addition of a west wing, which opened in 1984, and the upgrading and replacement of chairs and clinics. In 2009, a simulation lab was created, with 73 chairs, individual video screens and mannequins with removable jaws. The Walsh building, designed by architects Ian Reynolds and Gordon Wilson, was heritage listed as a Category 1 heritage building in 2005 as an "outstanding New Zealand example of international style Modernist architecture". The listing also noted the building's facade is among the earliest glass curtain wall buildings in the country.

=== Clinical Services Building and Walsh Building refurbishment ===
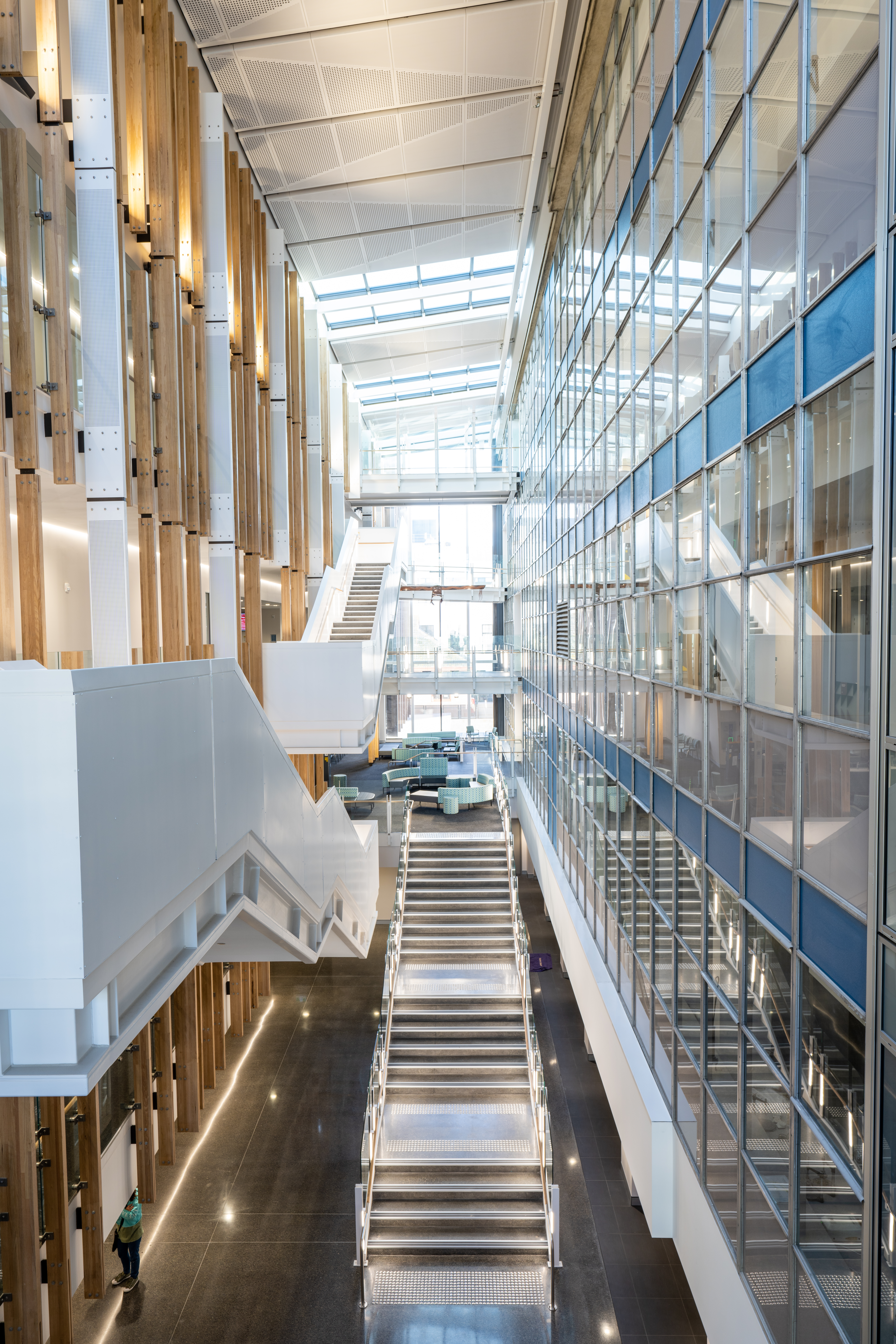
The Clinical Services Building (left) is joined to the back of the Walsh Building (right) through an atrium.

The dental school again outgrew its facilities, and the university approved redevelopment plans in 2015, with the plan developed by Auckland architects Jasmax. The plan involved the demolition of the existing Barningham building, and the west wing, which were replaced by a new four storey Clinical Services Building, and an atrium linking internally to the Walsh Building. The programme of work took five years to complete, and cost around $136 million. The Clinical Services Building was completed in 2019, and the refurbished Walsh Building, containing faculty offices and student learning and social spaces, opened in 2021. The Walsh facilities also include an 80-chair training simulation suite with mannequins with removable jaws, and the building has 215 chairs in total, where around 76,000 annual treatments are undertaken. The redevelopment was awarded the 2021 Te Kāhui Whaihanga New Zealand Institute of Architects Southern award.

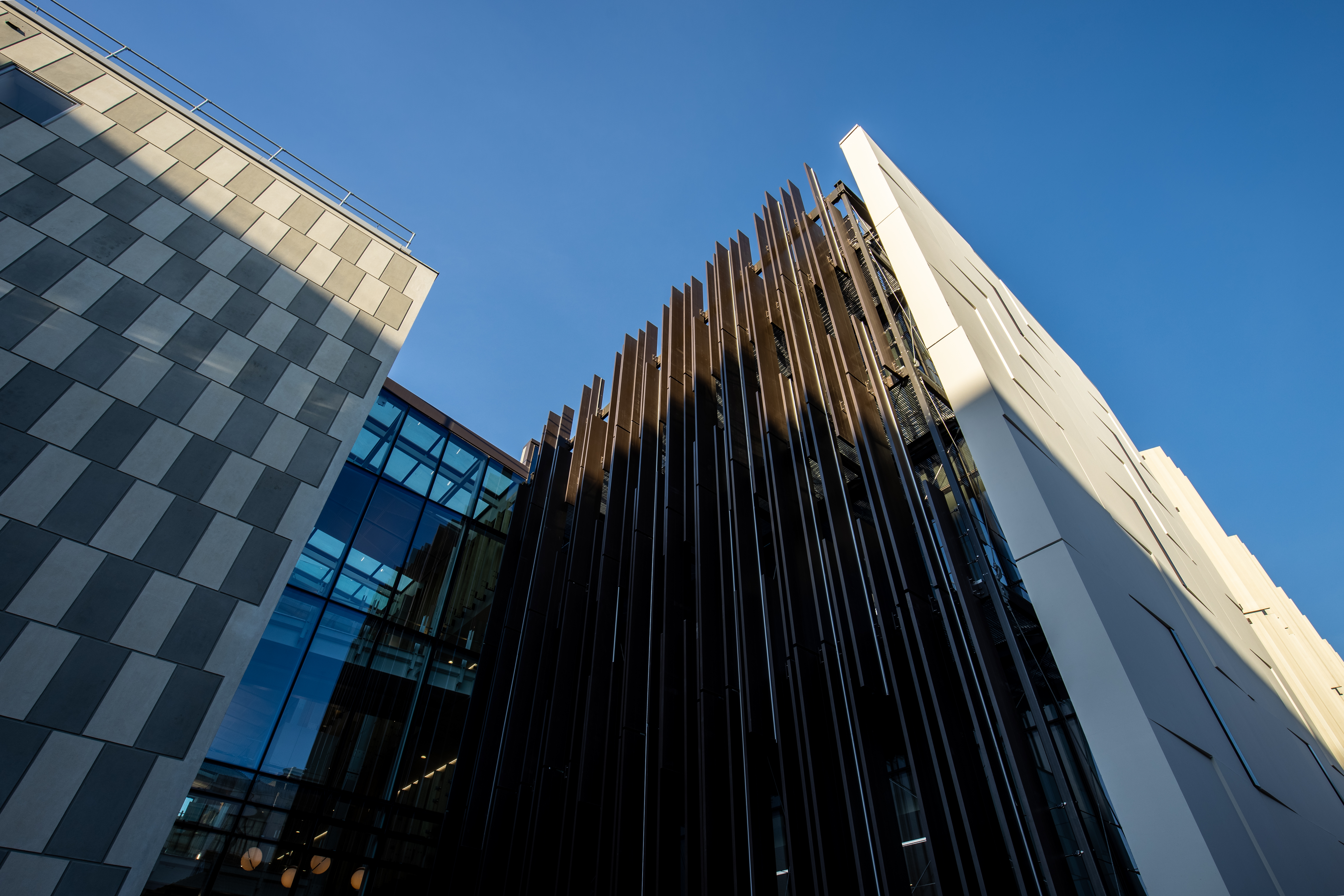
The Clinical Services Building exterior

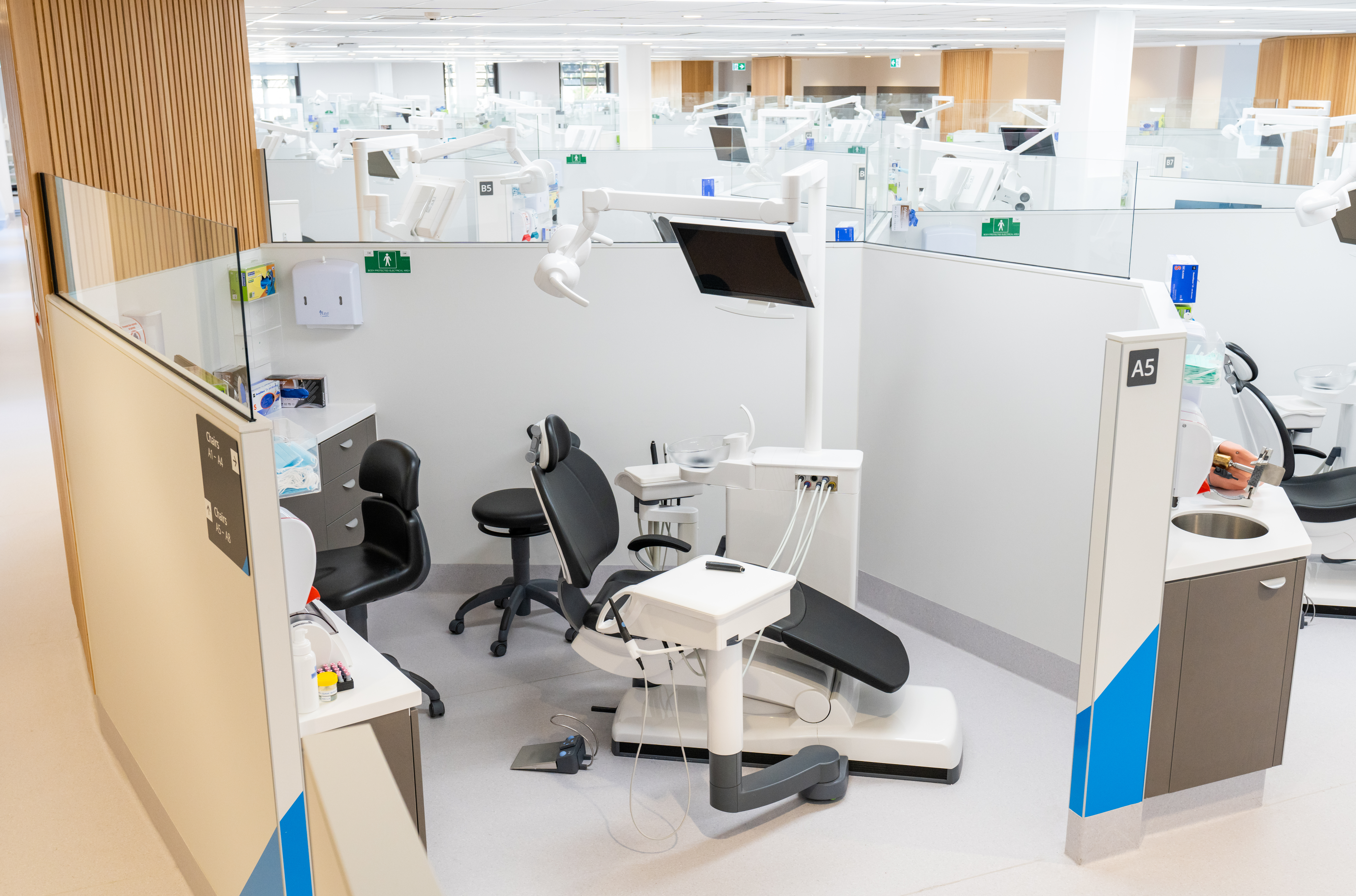
Dental chair and bay in the Clinical Services Building used to train dentistry and oral health students

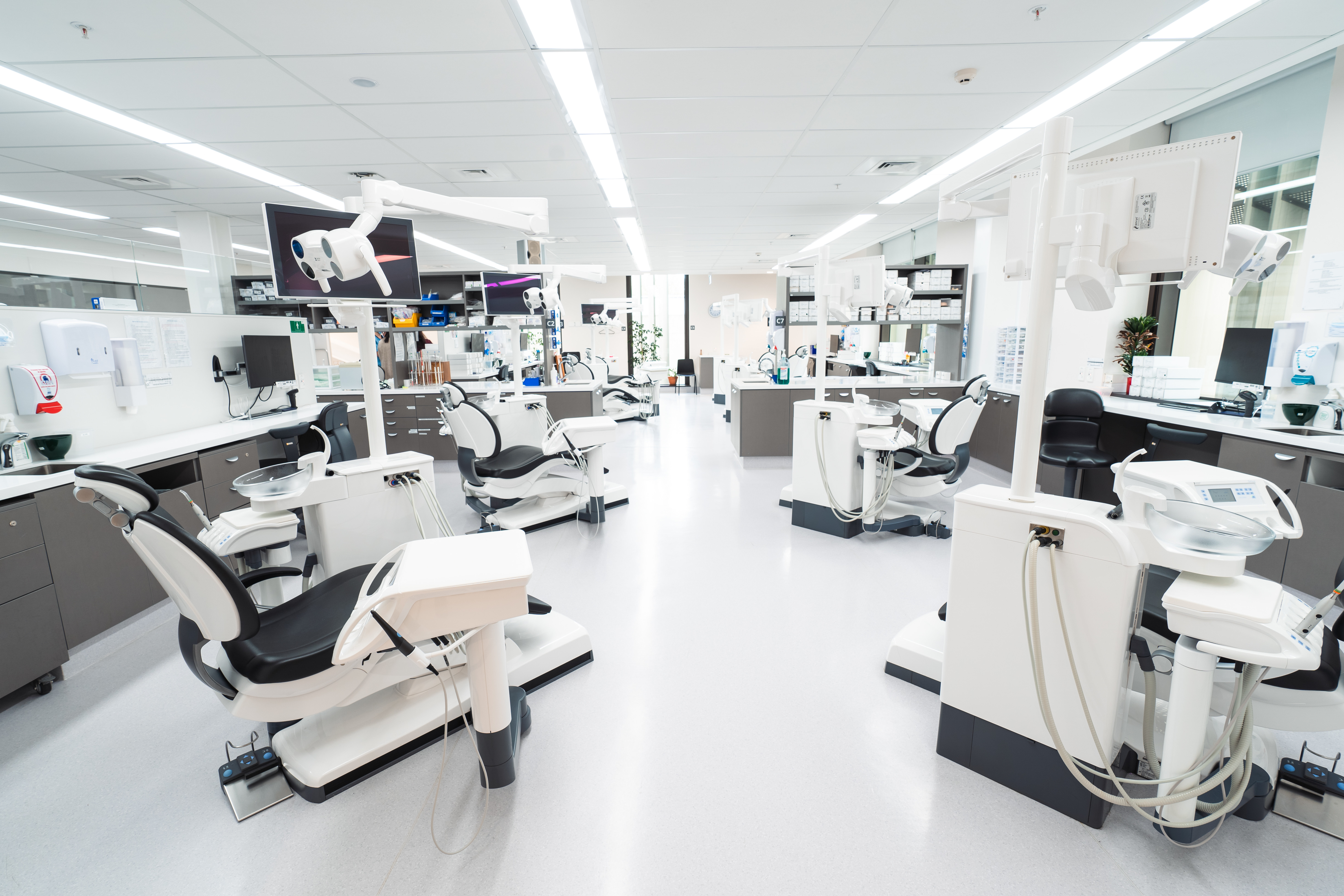
Clinic for training DClinDent (Orthodontics) students, Clinical Services Building

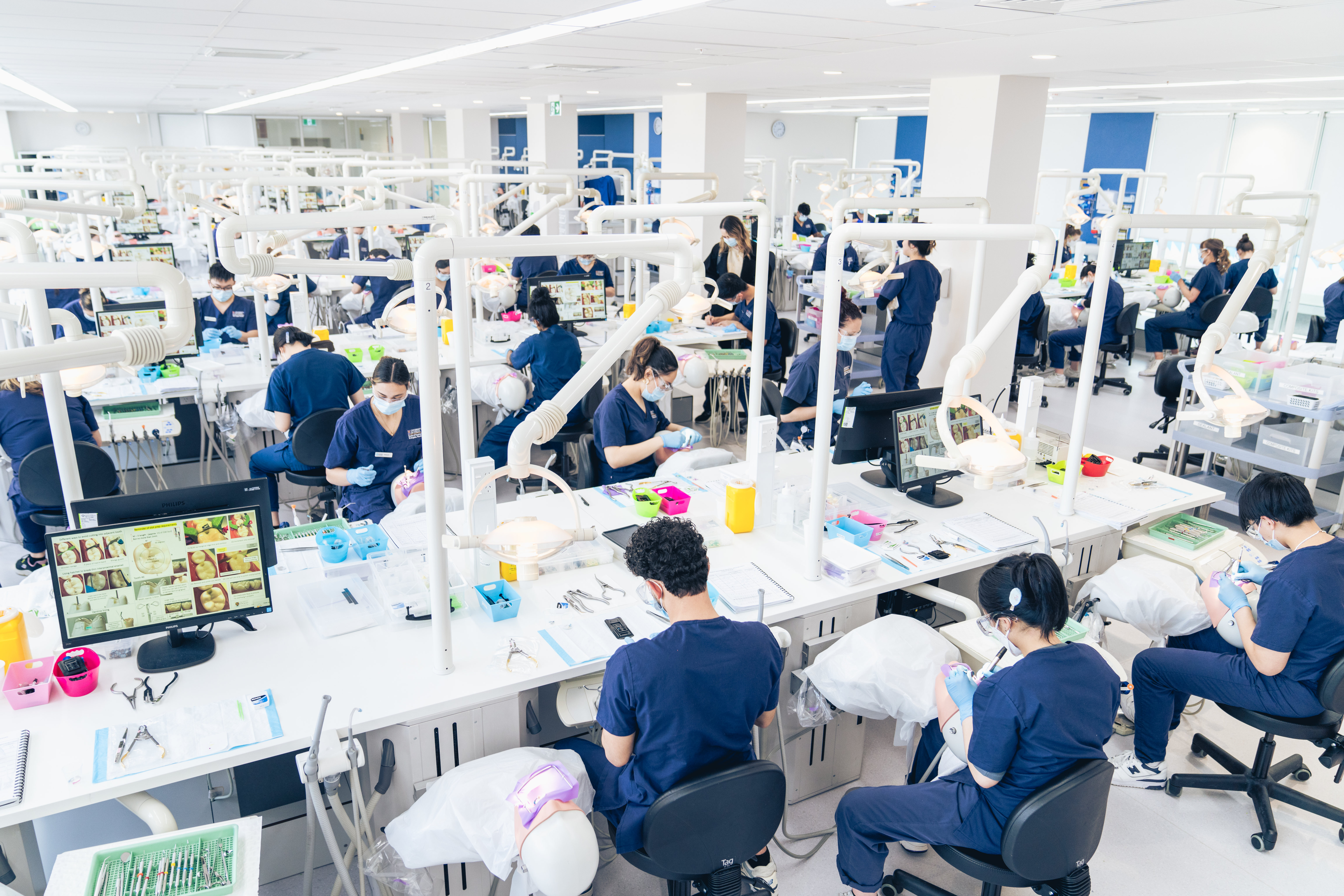
80-chair training simulation suite with mannequins with removable jaws

=== Auckland Dental Facility ===
The University of Otago opened a dental facility in Manurewa, Auckland, in a new purpose-built clinic in February 2021. The 32-chair clinic provides space for up to 48 final year students to train by treating patients from the local community under supervision, which includes a community oral health service for children and youth. There is an additional chair for teledentistry, a seminar room, and a 16-chair simulation suite.

== Sir John Walsh Research Institute ==
The Sir John Walsh Research Institute was established in 2007, on the dental school's centenary. The Institute comprises the research arm of the dental school, and conducts basic, applied, and clinical research in the fields of dentistry, dental technology and oral health, in New Zealand and the Pacific. The inaugural director was Professor Jules Kieser (1950–2014). The second director was Professor Richard Cannon, who served from 2014 to 2021. Professor Warwick Duncan was appointed as the third director in 2021. Researchers at the institute conduct research in areas such as biomaterials, biomechanics and oral implantology; craniofacial research; dental epidemiology and public health; dental engineering and tissue regeneration; molecular microbiology; oral immunopathology; dental education and clinical and translational research.

The institute awards an annual Sir John Walsh Research Award, which "acknowledges excellence over a long period by a staff member at the school". Recipients include Richard Cannon (2011), Dawn Coates (2023), and Jonathan Broadbent. The institute is also the home of the Centre For Bioengineering & Nanomedicine, a University of Otago research centre which aims to translate basic biological science, medical health and biomaterials research into improved health outcomes.

== Programmes ==
=== Undergraduate programmes ===
- Bachelor of Dental Surgery (BDS), with Honours
- Bachelor of Oral Health (BOH)
- Bachelor of Dental Technology (BDentTech), with Honours

=== Graduate programmes ===
The Faculty of Dentistry offers graduate programmes leading to Master of Community Dentistry, Master of Oral Health, Master of Dental Technology and Master of Dentistry degrees.

Doctoral students may complete a Doctor of Dental Science or a Doctor of Clinical Dentistry. The latter is available in the following areas:

- Endodontics
- Oral medicine
- Oral pathology
- Oral surgery
- Orthodontics
- Paediatric dentistry
- Periodontology
- Prosthodontics
- Special needs dentistry

The Faculty offers Postgraduate Diplomas in Clinical Dentistry, Community Dentistry, Dental Technology, and Clinical Dental Technology.

=== Accreditation and ranking ===
Otago University Faculty of Dentistry is accredited by the Dental Council (New Zealand). The undergraduate and postgraduate qualifications are recognised by the Royal Australasian College of Dental Surgeons.

In 2015, when Quacquarelli Symonds introduced ranking for dentistry into their university world rankings, the Otago school was ranked eighth in the world, which was the first time any New Zealand subject had ranked in the top ten.

== Notable faculty ==
- John Broughton (born 1947), academic, dentist and playwright
- Bernadette Drummond, professor of dentistry
- Angela Pack (born 1943), periodontist
- Henry Pickerill (1879–1956) surgeon and researcher
- Alison Rich, dentistry academic
- W. Murray Thomson CNZM, emeritus professor of dentistry
- John Walsh (1911–2003) Australian–New Zealand dental academic and dean
- John Le Bailly Warren OBE (1916–2000), dean of the school
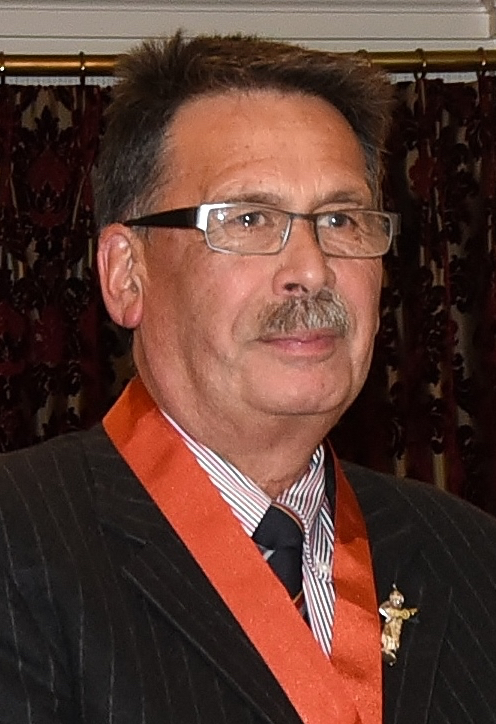
John Broughton

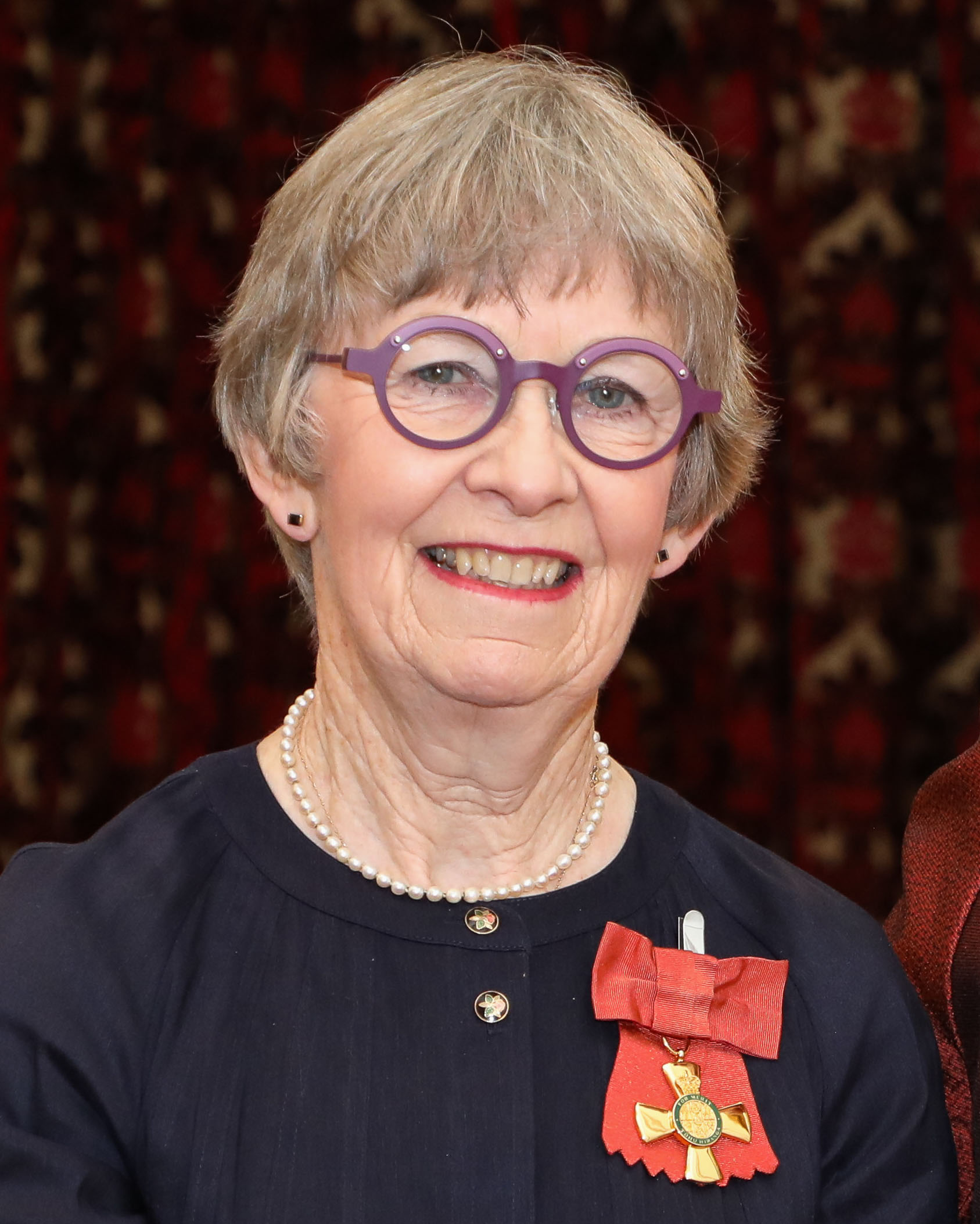
Bernadette Drummond

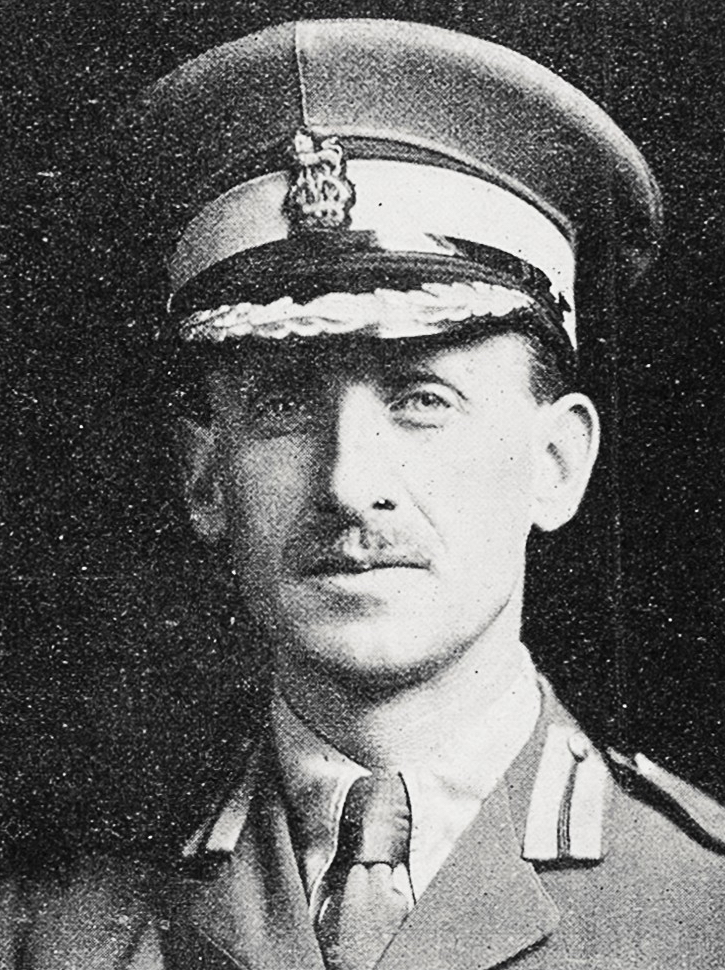
Percy Pickerill

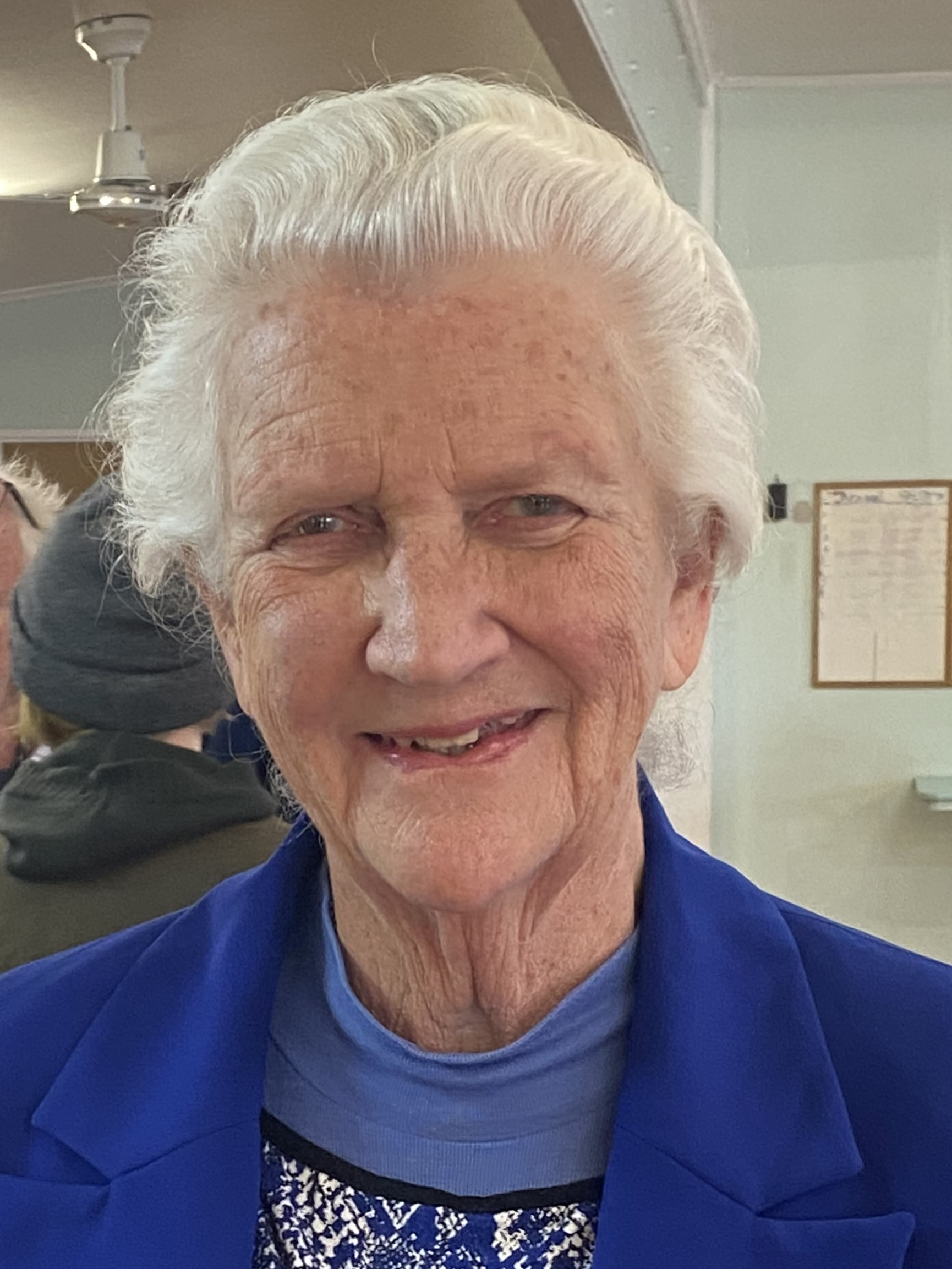
Angela Pack

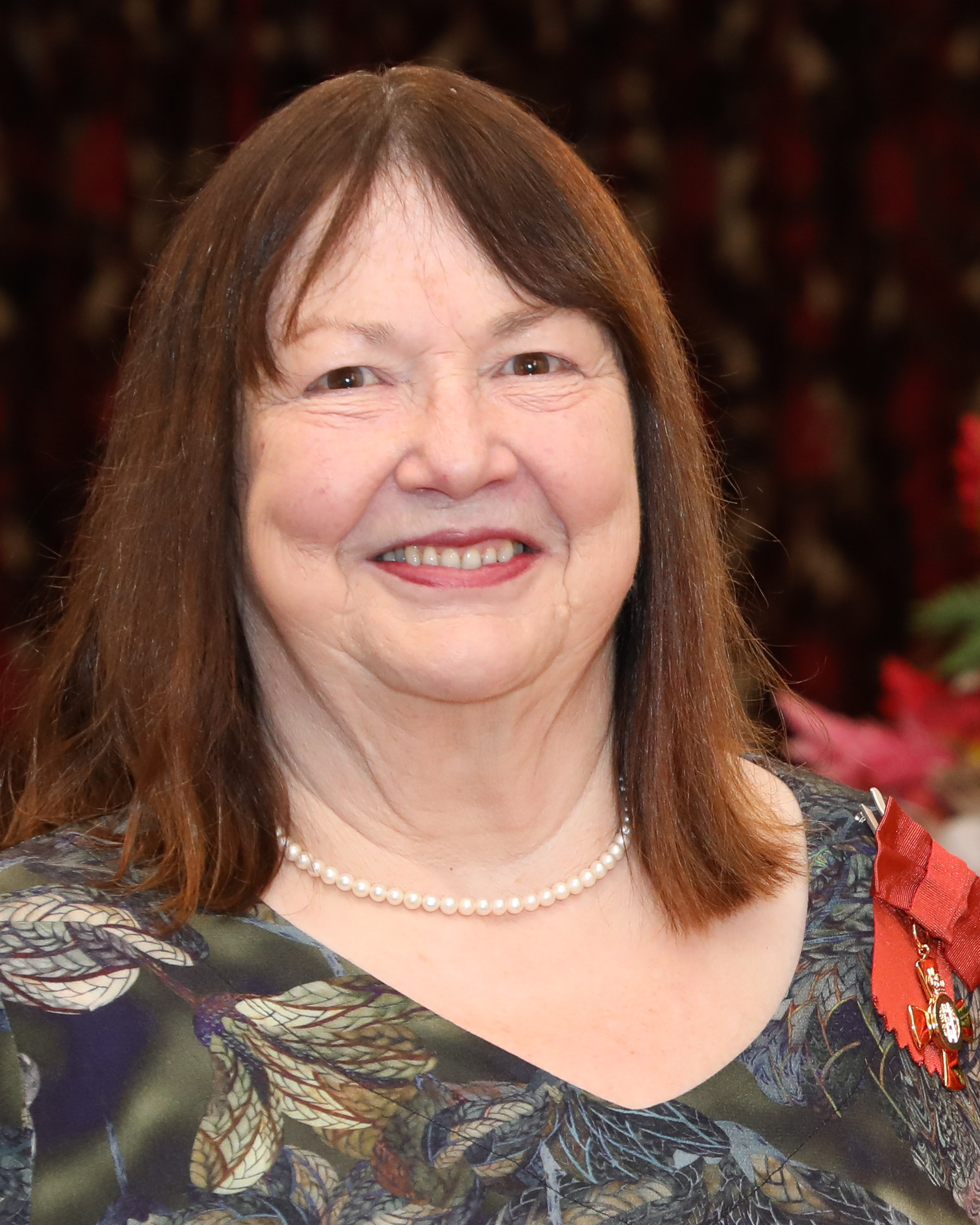
Alison Rich

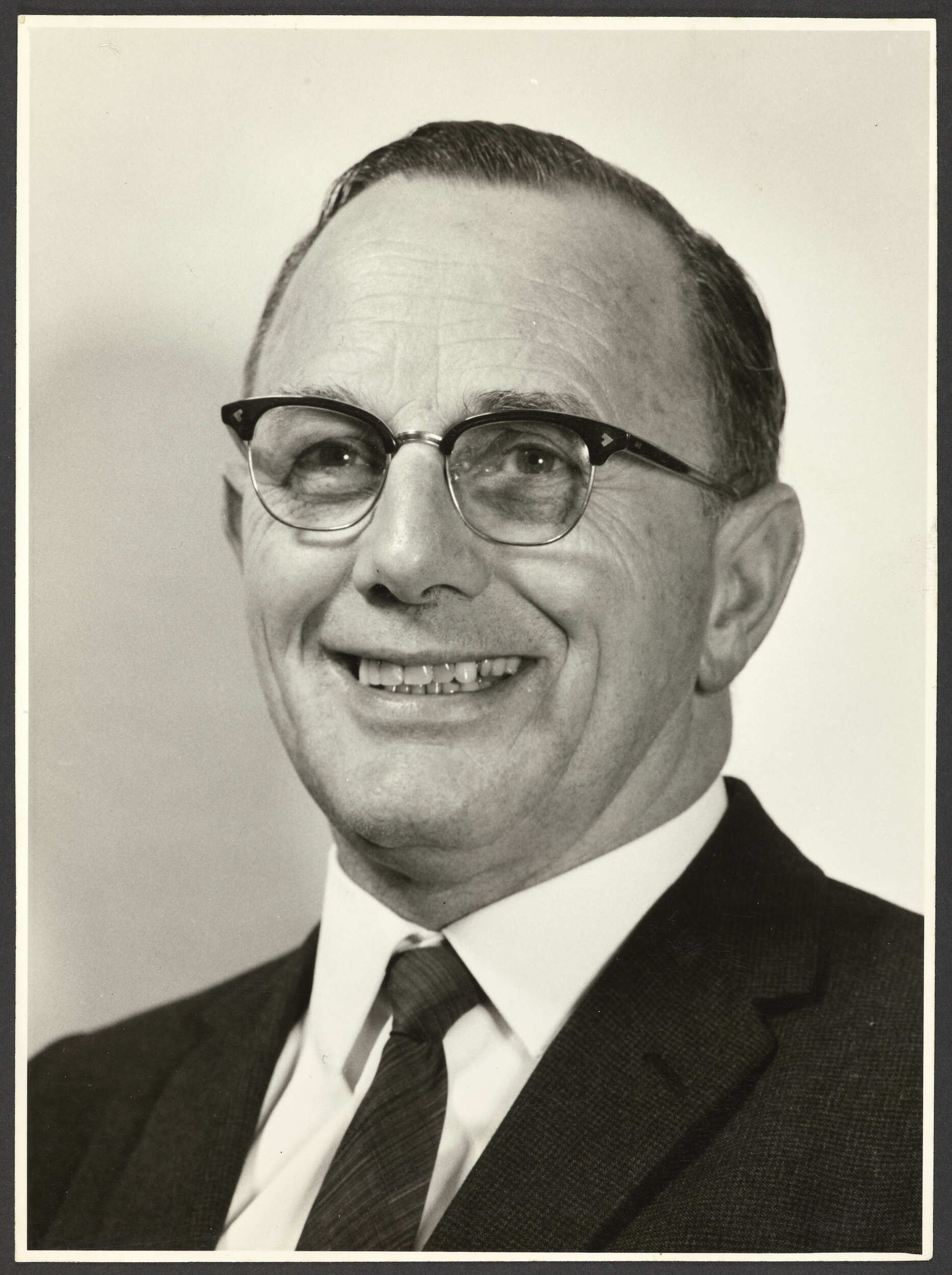
John Walsh

== Notable alumni ==
- Trevor Berghan (1914–1998), New Zealand international rugby union player
- Norah Burnard (1902–1979), New Zealand school dental supervisor and journal editor
- Cam Calder (born 1952), New Zealand doctor and politician
- Jack Davies (1916–1997), New Zealand swimmer
- Stewart Edward (born 1943), New Zealand cricketer (born 1943)
- Elizabeth Fanning (1918–2007), New Zealand dental surgeon
- Harold Frost (bowls) (1874–1950), New Zealand bowls player
- Sir Charles Hercus (1888–1971), New Zealand doctor and professor of public health
- John Kennedy-Good (1915–2005), New Zealand mayor
- Albert Kewene (born c.1939), first registered Māori dentist
- Walker Morete, first Māori person to graduate with a Bachelor of Dental Surgery, in 1928
- David Lindsay (1906–1978), New Zealand rugby union player
- Tom Logan (1927–2011), New Zealand water polo player, swimmer, surf lifesaver, dentist and naval officer
- Paul Sapsford (1949–2009), New Zealand international rugby union player
- John Llewellyn Saunders (1891–1961), New Zealand dentist and public health administrator
- Sam Smith (born 1984/1985), New Zealand comedian and author
- John Tanner (1927–2020), New Zealand rugby union player
- Blair Tennent (1898–1976), New Zealand politician
- David Watt (1920–1996), New Zealand cricketer and periodontist
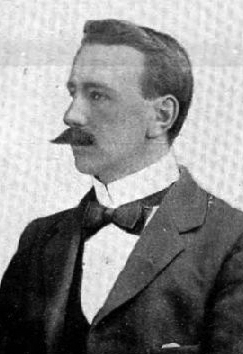
Harold Frost

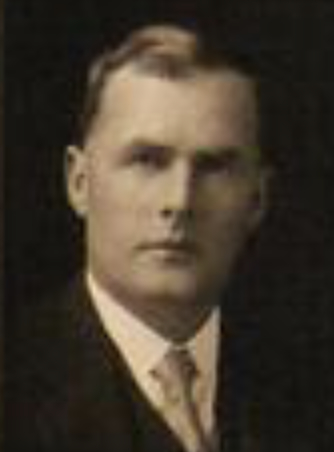
Charles Hercus

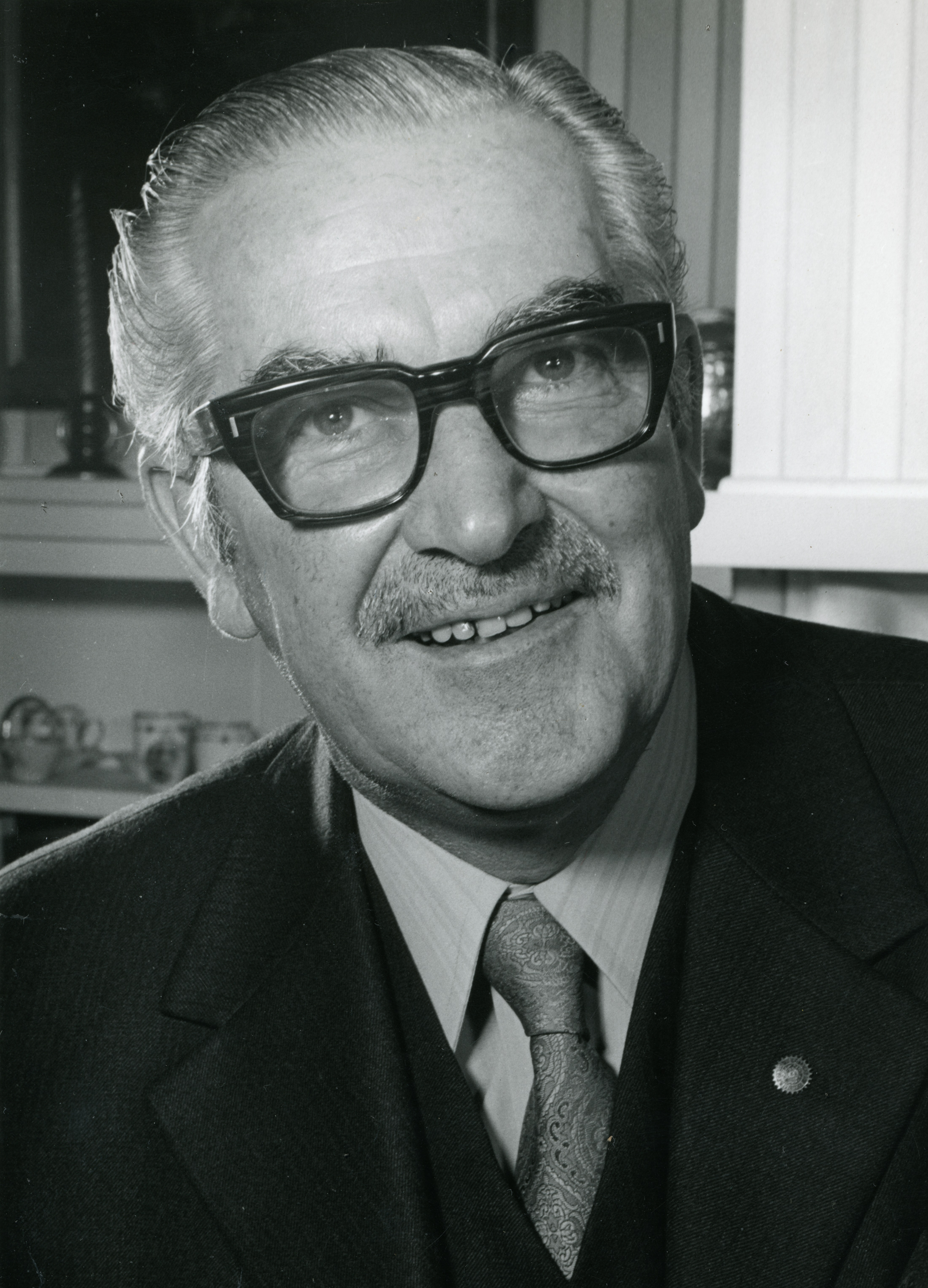
John Kennedy-Good

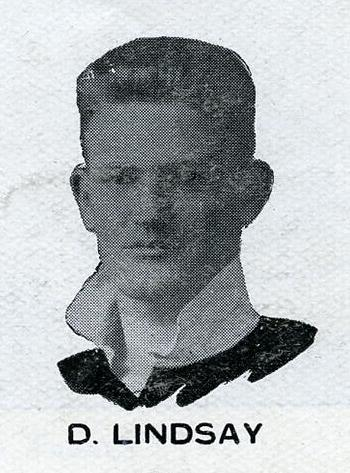
Dave Lindsay

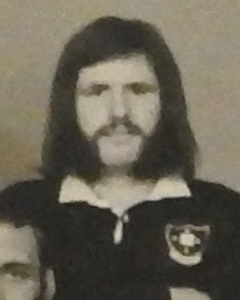
Paul Sapsford

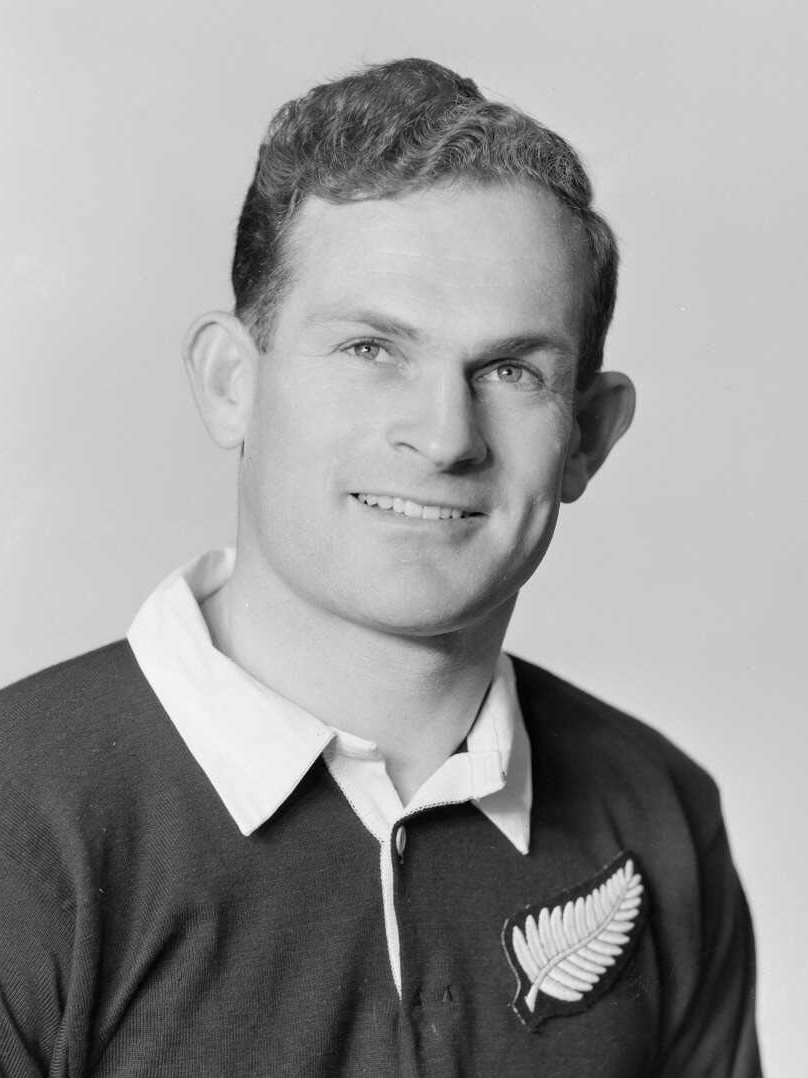
John Tanner

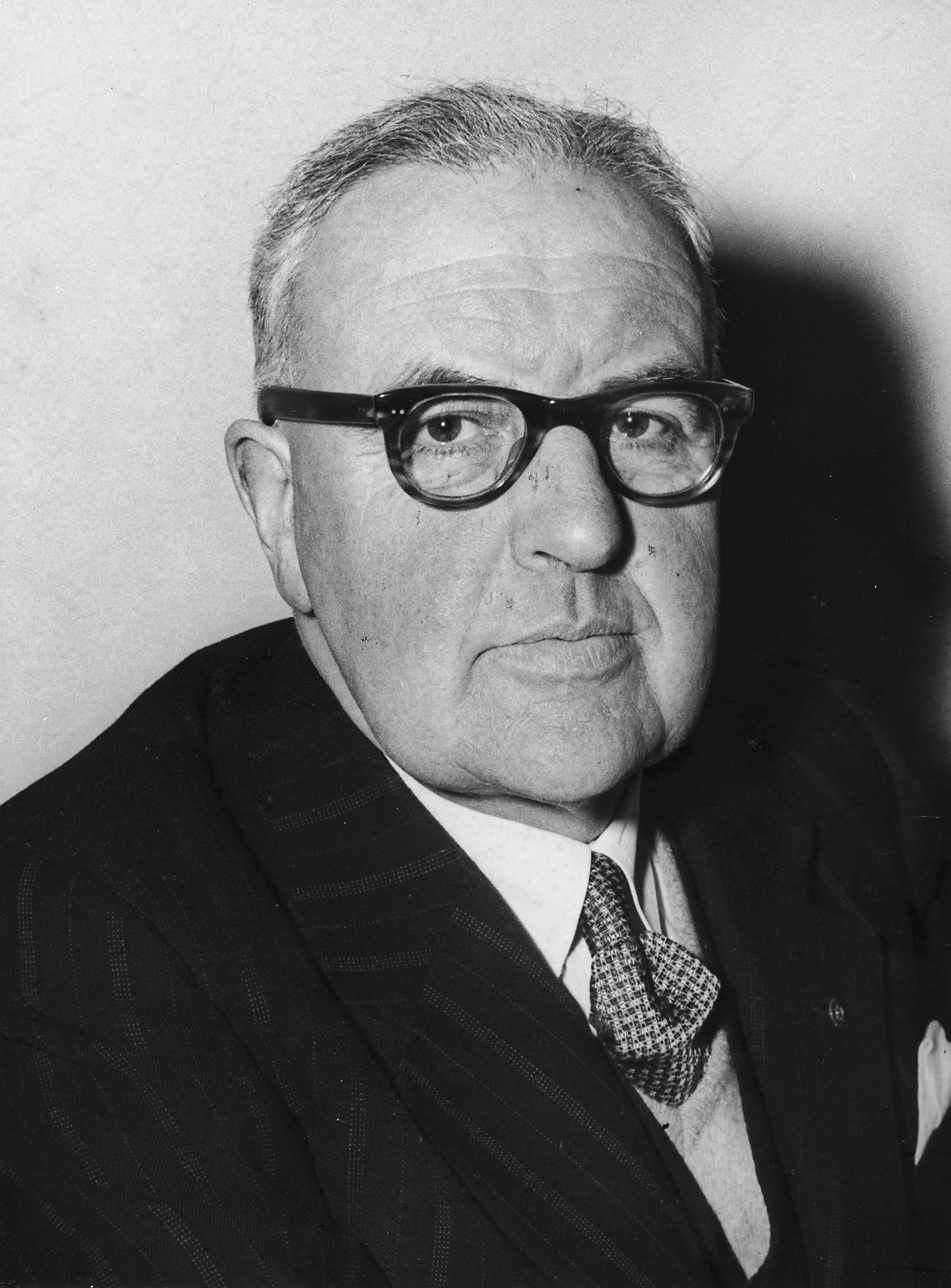
Blair Tennent
