= Henry Pickerill =

British surgeon and researcher

Henry Pickerill CBE
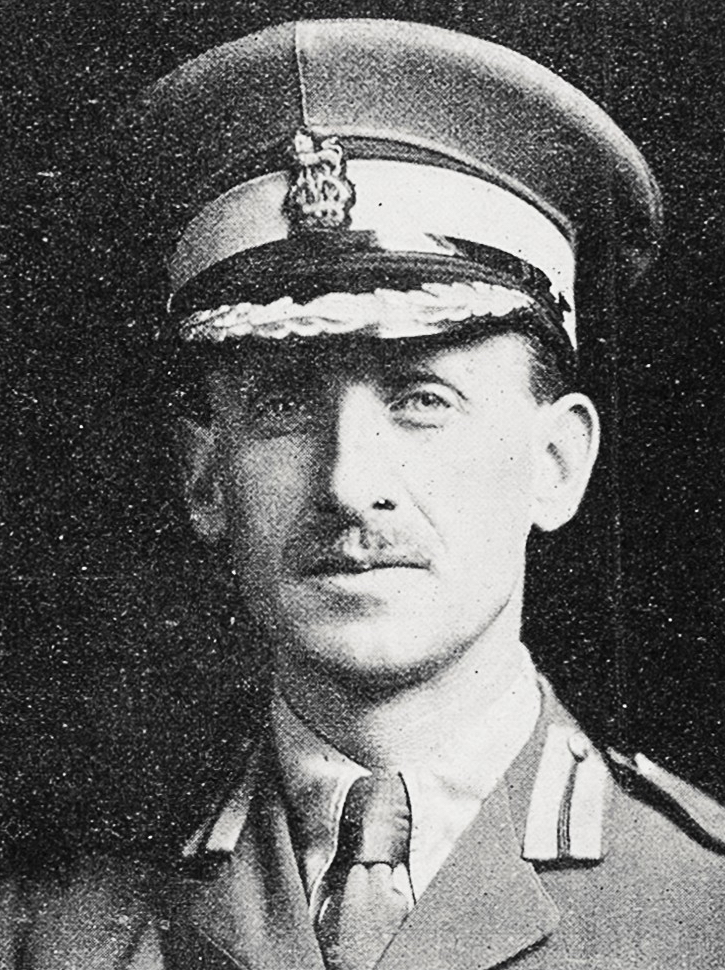

Personal details
- Born: 3 August 1879 Hereford, England
- Died: 10 August 1956 (aged 77) Upper Hutt, New Zealand
- Spouses: Mabel Knott (m. 1906; div. 1934) Cecily Clarkson (m. 1934)
- Education: University of Birmingham
- Occupation: Dentist and plastic surgeon

Military service
- Allegiance: New Zealand
- Branch/service: New Zealand Military Forces
- Years of service: 1915-1920
- Rank: Lieutenant Colonel
- Unit: New Zealand Medical Corps

Henry Percy Pickerill CBE (3 August 1879 – 10 August 1956) was a British-born New Zealand dental surgeon and researcher, university administrator and plastic surgeon. Pickerill made major contributions to several fields of dentistry and plastic surgery both in New Zealand and overseas.

== Early life ==
Pickerill, known to his family as Percy was born in Hereford, Herefordshire, England, on 3 August 1879, the oldest child of Mary Ann (née Gurney) and Thomas Pickerill. His father was at the time a commercial clerk and was later the managing director of the Lugwardine Tile Works which made porcelain tiles.

The eldest and only surviving son, Pickerill attended Chandos School, the private Collegiate School of Hereford and then Hereford County College.

Upon completing his secondary education he enrolled at the University of Birmingham in 1900 with the intention of studying dentistry and medicine. Following a two-year apprenticeship in dentistry he was awarded a LDSRCS (licentiate in dental surgery of the Royal College of Surgeons of England) in 1903. The University of Birmingham was the first university in Great Britain to offer a BDS degree and which allowed Pickerill to take advantage of the dental and medical degrees sharing common courses to gain a BDS and MBChB in 1904. Later he added from the University of Birmingham, a MD and MDS, both in 1911, and MCh in 1923.

Upon graduating Pickerill worked in a dental practice in Hereford and as a clinical demonstrator in the dental department of the General Hospital in Birmingham. In 1906 he was appointed a lecturer in dental pathology and histology at the University of Birmingham. In that same year he also married.

== Immigration to New Zealand ==
In 1906 after seeing an advertisement he applied for and was appointed at the age of 28 to the position of Dean of the Dental School at the University of Otago. His submitted CV included a claim that he had attended the University of Oxford. However, there is no record of him having attended the university.

In the early 20th century entry to the dental profession in New Zealand was restricted to those who had completed a degree or certificate of proficiency in dental surgery. In response, the dental school of the University of Otago was established on 1 July 1907 with a temporary director assisted by 12 honorary dental surgeons.

Pickerill reached Dunedin and took up his position in September 1907 on a salary of £500 a year.

Initially the first students were those who had already served apprenticeships with established dentists and had enrolled at the school to complete their final qualifications. Beginning in 1908, Charles Hercus was one of the first three who enrolled to undertake the four-year Bachelor of Dentistry degree. Another three students started in May of the same year. Pickerill was to convince Hercus to study medicine upon completing his dentistry degree. Hercus went on to have a distinguished career in medicine.

Pickerill established himself as a prolific author, researcher and teacher on a wide range of subjects including cariology, oral physiology and oral and maxillofacial surgery. Pickerill taught most of the classes which covered pathology, bacteriology, orthodontics, dental mechanics as well as actual dental surgery.

In 1909 Pickerill introduced a short course on dentistry for medical students. Since its opening the school had no shortage of patients. However the school finances were plagued by a shortage of students and thus income, which was not resolved until a campaign led by acting Dean O.V. Davies led to bursaries covering fees and living costs for dental students that was established in 1917. As both teacher and Dean he introduced high standards of training during the long and bitter argument among the New Zealand medical fraternity over whether dentists should pass through an apprenticeship system or be university-trained.

Pickerill also did a great deal of research and was a prolific author, notable among them being his essay The Prevention of Dental Caries and Oral Sepsis, for which he received the Cartwright Prize of the Royal College of Surgeons of England in 1911 (subsequently published in book form in 1912) and Stomatology in General Practice: A Textbook of Diseases of the Teeth and Mouth (1912).

Pickerill believed that child-care practices and hygiene standards in New Zealand were inadequate and encouraged dentists to support the recently formed Plunket Society, which aimed to improve child health.

In conjunction with Sydney Champtaloup, Professor of Bacteriology and Public Health at the Otago Medical School, Pickerill undertook a study to compare the state of the teeth of the Maori population located in the remote sparsely Urewera with those of the general population. The object was to confirm studies undertaken in other countries that the natural diet of native populations made them seemingly immune to dental caries. Champtaloup was unable to leave his laboratory for the first trip in 1912 so accommodated by an interpreter, Pickerill observed in his words, "more perfect sets of teeth than I had ever seen before". Together with Champtaloup he revisited the area in late 1913, taking a full set of laboratory equipment.

Pickerill served as editor of the New Zealand Dental Journal from 1909 to 1916.

== Service in World War 1 ==
In June 1915 Pickerill received a commission as a territorial captain with the New Zealand Medical Corps. Pickerill, together with Thomas Hunter and other members of the New Zealand Dental Association was successful in pushing for the creation of a dental corps. Once it was established in November 1915 as the New Zealand Dental Corps (NZDC) he was immediately transferred to as one of the two original Assistant Directors of Dental Services.

In 1916 Pickerill took leave from his position at the University of Otago to serve overseas with the NZDC, departing New Zealand on 30 December 1916 with the 20th Reinforcements NZEF on the troopship Athenic. Concerned that too many soldiers were returning to New Zealand with dental and jaw injuries that could have been improved by earlier treatment, General George Richardson of the N.Z.E.F. had specifically asked for Pickerill. As a result, upon arriving in England in March 1917, he was posted to the No 2 New Zealand General Hospital (Mount Felix Hospital) at Walton-on-Thames with orders to establish a unit for the treatment of jaw and facial injuries. Upon arrival Pickerill found that the 50-bed ward had no jaw cases and no workroom. Within two months he had 40 patients, a fully equipped workshop, and a permanent dental mechanic. Pickerill was soon operating as a maxillofacial surgeon, gaining a reputation in the fields of facial reconstruction and plastic surgery as he pioneered the use of bone, skin and fat grafting, and jaw wiring. This was despite no formal training or qualification in this field.

On 9 January 1918, Pickerill, by now with the rank of major, his dental mechanic and 29 patients were transferred under duress to the newly opened Queen's Hospital at Sidcup. Initially, Pickerill was reluctant to move to Sidcup. Two days after arriving, Pickerill suggested that he return to New Zealand, where he felt that while resuming his duties as Dean he would still have time to undertake further corrective work once the patients' initial treatment had stabilized during the voyage home. He however changed his mind and stayed in his position. Pickerill’s team carried out 113 plastic surgery operations at Sidcup between 11 February and 14 July 1918.

== Return to New Zealand ==
Following the end of the war Pickerill, his unit, and the remaining 59 patients departed in March 1919 on the SS Tainui. After their arrival back in New Zealand in May 1919 they established themselves as the Facial and Jaw Department within the military section at Dunedin Hospital. The military had established this specialist orthopedic centre within Dunedin Hospital under the command of Lt. Col. L. E. Barnett in 1918. It was housed in the Batchelor, Sidcup and newly built Alexandra Wards of the hospital. In June 1919, Pickerill succeeded Barnett as officer in charge. The centre, when combined with the 25 bed capacity of the Jaw Hospital, could treat and house 111 servicemen. Reporting to Pickerill were four technical staff - a modeller, photographer, dental mechanic, and artist. In addition Pickerill was able to draw on the services of other members of the military establishment of the hospital. When the military section was closed in 1920 and its assets transferred to the Hospital Board, Pickerill was appointed to the honorary staff of the hospital. While surgeries were undertaken in the hospital of the Red Cross Society in June 1919 rented for three years Woodside, the substantial home which was owned by Richard Brinsley the proprietor of a local iron-foundry firm at 4 Lovelock Avenue in North Dunedin. Known as the Woodside Jaw Hospital, it was used to house the patients Pickerill had bought back from the United Kingdom, conduct some treatments, and as act a convalescent centre.

In June 1919 Pickerill was recognized for his service by being promoted to lieutenant-colonel.

Pickerill continued overseeing the long-term care of the unit's patients until December 1921 when, after the closing of the unit, he returned full-time to his position as Dean of the Dental School where he found that as the result of the work of O.V. Davies the number of students had increased and dentistry as a university discipline was well established. As the existing building was proving to be too small, Pickerill had to overcome a proposal by Auckland interests establish a rival dental school in that city. However he was able to convince the government that the dental school needed to be close to the country's only medical school. Approval for the construction of a new building was given in April 1924, and it opened in June 1926.

Pickerill strongly opposed the proposal by Thomas Anderson Hunter to establish a child dental health service which would be staffed by school dental nurses who were to receive just 18 months' training. His efforts failed to prevent the establishment of the New Zealand School Dental Service in 1921.

Using his wartime experience Pickerill developed what is known as the triangular or zig-zag graft to remove hare lips, principally on babies. This method cut the cleft into two triangles on each side and then rearranged the triangles.

== Move to Sydney ==
Pickerill resigned from the University of Otago in 1927 to move to Sydney, where he specialized in plastic surgery. His wife and family did not join him in Sydney. In 1933 he took up a post at the Royal North Shore Hospital in Sydney as senior plastic surgeon. His former house surgeon in Dunedin Hospital Cecily Mary Wise Clarkson joined him to assist and learn plastic surgery and then following his divorce, his wife.

== Return to New Zealand and private practice ==
A short time after their wedding the Pickerill’s returned to New Zealand in 1935 and settled in Wellington where they established a private practice which by 1941 was based in Kelvin Chambers on The Terrace. They continued to be close surgical associates, working together at Lewisham Hospital in Newtown. Pickerill was also a Senior Plastic Surgeon at Wellington Hospital.

The couple established Bassam in Lower Hutt in 1939 as a hostel providing live-in accommodation for children and their parents who were receiving surgery at Lewisham Hospital. By 1942 the eight-room Bassam had become a full private hospital specializing in treating children with cleft palates and other major congenital conditions needing plastic surgery. To prevent post-surgical and cross infection Bassam was the first hospital in New Zealand where all nursing, except during surgery and the changing of dressings, was done by the mothers of the young patients. This also ensured a strong bond between mother and baby. In addition no visitors were allowed while the infant and mother were in residence and no observers were invited into the operating room.

In 1946 the Pickerills also began monthly visits to the Middlemore Hospital, in Auckland. There they provided general plastic surgery, facial and jaw surgery, and repairs of cleft lips and palates. These short-term visits while not offering a full service, continued until 1950 when the hospital gained a resident plastic surgeon.

Pickerill retired in 1955.

== Death ==
Henry Pickerill died at Pinehaven, Upper Hutt, New Zealand on 10 August 1956. His ashes were taken to England by his wife and daughter and scattered from a bridge over the River Wye at Holme Lacy near Hereford.

== Honours and awards ==
For his service in the war Pickerill was awarded the British War Medal (1914-1920) and the Victory Medal with mention in despatches oak leaf.

In 1919 Pickerill was appointed an Officer of the Order of the British Empire, and he was promoted to Commander of the Order of the British Empire in the 1923 New Year Honours, in recognition of services after the war in connection with facial and jaw operations on wounded soldiers.

Henry Pickerill and Cecily Pickerill's personal papers were donated to the Hocken Collections. In 2015, this archive was added to the UNESCO New Zealand Memory of the World Register.

== Personal life ==
He married Mabel Louise Knott on 19 June 1906 at Birmingham. They had three sons and one daughter.

After divorcing Mabel Pickerill, he married Cecily Mary Wise Clarkson who was 27 years his junior, at Sydney on 17 December 1934. The couple had one daughter, Margaret. Cecily was also a surgeon. She was made a Dame Commander of the British Empire (DBE) in 1977 and died in July 1988.

Pickerill’s youngest son, Ethelbert Paul Pickerill, became a dentist and served as an officer of the NZ Dental Corps during World War 2.

== Publications ==
Pickerill, H P. (1909). "Radicular Aberrations". Proceedings of the Royal Society of Medicine2 (Odontol Sect): 145–61.

Pickerill, H P. (1909). "The medical aspect of dentistry and the necessity of dental instruction for medical students". British Medical Journal 1 (2511): 394–97. https://doi.org/10.1136/bmj.1.2511.394.

Pickerill, H.P. (1912). "Some pathological conditions found in the teeth and jaws of Maori skulls in New Zealand". Proc of the Royal Soc of Medicine. Odontological Section, 5 (3): 155–165.

Pickerill, H.P. and S. T. Champtaloup. (1913). "The bacteriology of the mouth in Maori children: Being Part of an Investigation into the Cause of Immunity to Dental Disease in the Maori of the Uriwera Country, N.Z". British Medical Journal 2 (2762): 1482–83. https://doi.org/10.1136/bmj.2.2762.1482.

Pickerill, H.P. (1914). "On the Production of Narrow Jaws by the Mastication of Tough and Fibrous Foods: (Synopsis of Communication.).” Proceedings of the Royal Society of Medicine 7 (Odontol Sect): 92–100.

Pickerill, H.P. (1914). "Internal Secretions and Dental Caries: With Special Reference to Thyroid Insufficiency". British Medical Journal 1 (2791): 1406–7. https://doi.org/10.1136/bmj.1.2791.1406.

Pickerill, H.P. (1916). "Treatment of fractured mandible accompanying gunshot wounds". British Medical Journal 2 (2899): 105–7. https://doi.org/10.1136/bmj.2.2899.105.

Pickerill, H.P. (1918). "Arthroplasty of Temporo-Mandibular Joint for Ankylosis". Proceedings of the Royal Society of Medicine 11 (Odontol Sect): 87–89.

Pickerill, H.P. (1918). "The 'Screw-Lever' Splint". Proceedings of the Royal Society of Medicine 11 (Odontol Sect): 90–92.

Pickerill, H.P. (1919). "Intra-Oral Skin-Grafting: The Establishment of the Buccal Sulcus". Proceedings of the Royal Society of Medicine 12 (Odontol Sect): 17–22.

Pickerill, H.P. (1927). "Non-Eruption of Teeth". Proceedings of the Royal Society of Medicine 20 (5): 603–5.

Pickerill, H. P. and Pickerill, C. M. (1945). "Early Treatment of Bell’s Palsy". British Medical Journal, 2 (4422): 457–459. https://doi.org/10.1136/bmj.2.4422.457

Pickerill, H. P. and Pickerill, C. M. (1945). "Elimination of Cross-infection". British Medical Journal, 1 (4387): 159–160. https://doi.org/10.1136/bmj.1.4387.159

Pickerill, H. P. and Pickerill, C. M. (1945). "Ectopia vesicae". The Australian and New Zealand Journal of Surgery, 15: 91–98.

Pickerill, H P. (1946). "The Advantages of Early Skin Grafting". The New Zealand Medical Journal 45 (February): 45–49.

Pickerill, H P. (1946). "Save the Foreskins". The New Zealand Medical Journal 45 (June): 238.

Pickerill, H P. (1947. "Note on Cranial Autoplasty". The British Journal of Surgery 35 (138): 204–7. https://doi.org/10.1002/bjs.18003513814.

Pickerill, H P. (1948). "Plastic Surgery in the Treatment of Malignancy". British Journal of Plastic Surgery 1 (3): 181–86.

Pickerill, H P. (1949). "Ligation of the Mandibular (Inferior Dental) Artery". British Medical Journal 1 (4603): 527. https://doi.org/10.1136/bmj.1.4603.527-a.

Pickerill, H P. (1949). "Ligation of the Mandibular (Inferior Dental) Artery". The New Zealand Dental Journal 45 (222): 241.

Pickerill, H P. (1950). "Pascal’s Law as Applied to Skin Grafting". British Journal of Plastic Surgery 2 (4): 274–77.

Pickerill, H P. (1950). "Immediate Orthodontics". The New Zealand Dental Journal 46 (225): 126–30.

Pickerill, H P. (1951). "Ombredanne’s Syndrome, Hyperpyrexia Pallida or Paleur Hyperthermie". The New Zealand Medical Journal 50 (275): 51–55.

Pickerill, H P. (1951). "On the Possibility of Establishing Skin Banks". British Journal of Plastic Surgery 4 (3): 157–65.

Pickerill, H P. (1951). "Sebaceoma Nasi, Adenoma Sebaceum (Rhinophyma).” The New Zealand Medical Journal50 (279): 502–3.

Pickerill, H P. (1952). "Hyperpyrexia Pallida and Its Prevention". The Australian and New Zealand Journal of Surgery 21 (4): 261–68. https://doi.org/10.1111/j.1445-2197.1952.tb03416.x.

Pickerill, H P. (1954). "The Queen’s Hospital, Sidcup". British Journal of Plastic Surgery 6 (4): 247–49.

Pickerill, H P. (1954). "Restoration of Palatal and Lip Defects". The Australian and New Zealand Journal of Surgery 24 (2): 144–46. https://doi.org/10.1111/j.1445-2197.1954.tb05083.x.

Pickerill, H.P. and C. Pickerill (1954). Speech training for cleft palate patients. Christchurch: Whitcombe and Tombs. 2nd ed. OCLC 220813251

Pickerill, C.M. and Pickerill, H. P. (1954). "Nursing by the mother and cross-infection". Lancet 267 (6838): 599–600. https://doi.org/10.1016/s0140-6736(54)90382-7

Pickerill, C.M. and Pickerill, H. P. (1954). "Elimination of hospital cross-infection in children: nursing by the mother". Lancet, 266 (6809): 425–429. https://doi.org/10.1016/s0140-6736(54)91137-x
