= Cecily Pickerill =

New Zealand plastic surgeon

Dame Cecily Mary Wise Pickerill DBE (née Clarkson, 9 February 1903 – 21 July 1988) was a New Zealand plastic surgeon who specialised in treating infants with cleft palates and other conditions needing plastic surgery. She successfully demonstrated that care of hospitalised infants by their mothers prevented infections.

== Life and career ==
Cecily Mary Wise Clarkson was born in Taihape, New Zealand, in 1903, the daughter of Margaret Ann Clarkson (née Hunter) and Rev. Percy Wise Clarkson, Taihape's first Anglican vicar. She was educated at Taihape School and the Diocesan High School for Girls (in Auckland). In 1921, she began her medical studies at the University of Otago, graduating MB, ChB in 1925.

As a house surgeon in Dunedin, she was a pupil of Henry Pickerill, Dean of the University of Otago Dental School, a pioneering plastic surgeon, and facial and jaw surgeon at Dunedin Hospital. In 1927, Henry left Dunedin to take up a post at the Royal North Shore Hospital in Sydney, where Cecily joined him to assist and train in plastic surgery.

In 1934, she married Pickerill, who was 27 years her senior. Soon after they returned to Wellington. In 1939 they opened the Bassam Hospital in Bloomfield Terrace, Lower Hutt, a private hospital for infants needing plastic surgery for cleft palates, hare lips, hypospadias, syndactylism, burn scars and birthmarks.

Initially Bassam was run as a hostel with the surgery being done at Wellington Hospital, Calvary Hospital (now Wakefield Hospital) or Lewisham Hospital (later the Home of Compassion). By 1942 Bassam was a specialist hospital. Cecily performed all the procedures although people were then mistrustful of female surgeons. She was assisted by women anaesthetists Jessie Burnett, Claudia Shand and Dora Young.

Care of infant patients at the Bassam was revolutionary at the time. Mothers roomed in with their infants and Pickerill developed the practice of the nurse-mother. Mothers would be responsible for all their child's daily needs except for surgery and changing dressings: making up formula, feeding, bathing, changing nappies (diapers), and taking babies outside.

Pickerill was able to demonstrate that the nurse-mother was crucial in preventing infections as infants avoided cross-infections which occurred from being handled by multiple nurses or being kept in nurseries.

The Pickerills also helped to set up the plastics unit at Middlemore Hospital, travelling to Auckland to work there at the weekends. William Manchester, another New Zealand plastic surgeon, was their registrar. She and her team retired in 1967. Bassam Hospital closed becoming Bloomfield Hospital where she died on 21 July 1988, aged 85.

== Personal life ==
The Pickerills had one daughter, Margaret. In 1935 they purchased three acres of land at Silverstream in Upper Hutt and built a house, Beechdale. The garden was a showplace for rhododendrons and camellias.

== Awards and honours ==
Pickerill became a member of the British Association of Plastic Surgeons (MBAPS) in 1949 and a life member of the Wellington branch of the New Zealand Medical Women's Association in 1972–1973.

She was appointed an Officer of the Order of the British Empire in the 1958 Queen's Birthday Honours, for services in the field of plastic surgery. In the 1977 Queen's Silver Jubilee and Birthday Honours, she was promoted to Dame Commander of the Order of the British Empire, for services to medicine, especially in the field of plastic surgery.

Henry Pickerill and Cecily Pickerill's personal papers were donated to the Hocken Collections. In 2015, this archive was added to the UNESCO Memory of the World Aotearoa New Zealand Ngā Mahara o te Ao register.

== Publications ==
- Pickerill, H. P. and Pickerill, C. M. (1945). "Early Treatment of Bell’s Palsy". British Medical Journal, 2 (4422): 457–459. https://doi.org/10.1136/bmj.2.4422.457
- Pickerill, H. P. and Pickerill, C. M. (1945). "Elimination of Cross-infection". British Medical Journal, 1 (4387): 159–160. https://doi.org/10.1136/bmj.1.4387.159
- Pickerill, H. P. and Pickerill, C. M. (1945). "Ectopia vesicae". The Australian and New Zealand Journal of Surgery, 15: 91–98.
- Pickerill, C. (1948). "Infant plastic surgery and mother nursing". New Zealand Medical Journal 47 (262): 618-623.
- Pickerill, C. (1949). "Infant plastic surgery and mother nursing". British Journal of Plastic Surgery, 2 (2): 116–124.
- Pickerill, H.P. and C. Pickerill (1954). Speech training for cleft palate patients. Christchurch: Whitcombe and Tombs. 2nd ed. OCLC 220813251
- Pickerill, C.M. and Pickerill, H. P. (1954). "Nursing by the mother and cross-infection". Lancet 267 (6838): 599–600. https://doi.org/10.1016/s0140-6736(54)90382-7
- Pickerill, C.M. and Pickerill, H. P. (1954). "Elimination of hospital cross-infection in children: nursing by the mother". Lancet, 266 (6809): 425–429. https://doi.org/10.1016/s0140-6736(54)91137-x
- Pickerill, C. (12 November 1955). "Infections in the newborn". BMJ 2 (4949): 1205.
- Harvey Brown, R. (1988). "Cecily Mary Wise Pickerill". Te Ara - the Encyclopedia of New Zealand.
- Harris, Beryl (2014). A dame we knew : a tribute to Dame Cecily Pickerill. [Wellington]. ISBN 9780473307271. OCLC 898210855.
- Maxwell, Margaret (1990). Women doctors in New Zealand : an historical perspective, 1921-1986. Auckland, N.Z.: IMS (N.Z.). ISBN 0473007983. OCLC 25456512.
- "Obituary". New Zealand Medical Journal. 101 (855): 646–647. 1988.
