= Middlemore Hospital =

Hospital in Auckland, New Zealand

Coordinates: 36°57′46″S 174°50′23″E

- Counties Manukau Health
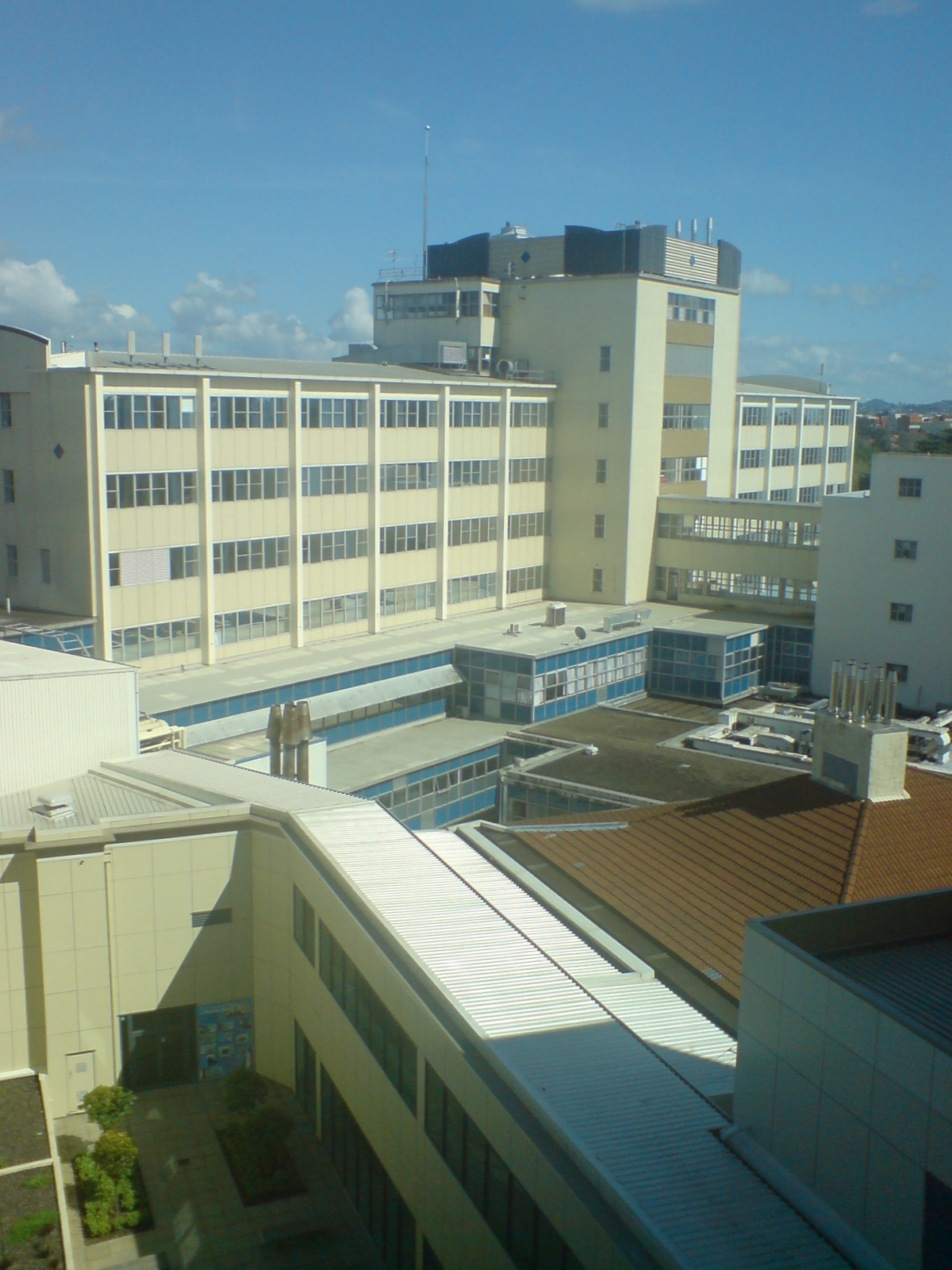

Geography
- Location: Ōtāhuhu, Auckland, New Zealand

Organisation
- Care system: Public Hospital
- Type: Tertiary hospital
- Affiliated university: University of Auckland

Services
- Emergency department: Yes
- Beds: 980 beds

History
- Founded: 1947; 79 years ago

Links
- Website: http://www.countiesmanukau.health.nz

Middlemore Hospital is a major public hospital in the suburb of Ōtāhuhu, Auckland, New Zealand. The hospital has approximately 800 beds. There are 24 operating theatres across two sites.

Middlemore Hospital is the largest hospital in Auckland, with around 4,700 staff providing treatment to more than 91,000 inpatients and over 354,000 outpatients per year (data from 2007). The Emergency Department (ED) is the busiest mixed (adult / paediatric) ED in Australasia, with an annual census of 98,110 patients in 2011, and the rate of presentations to ED increasing at a rate of 5–8% per annum. In 2014, Middlemore Hospital treated more general surgical patients than any other hospital in the country (11,500 patients, or over 32 admissions per day), with approximately 75% of those being emergency presentations. This number has also been rising steadily over the past few years and makes the hospital the busiest emergency general surgical hospital in the country. It is also known to care for an above-average share of expecting mothers, staff generally delivering over 20 babies per day.

== History ==
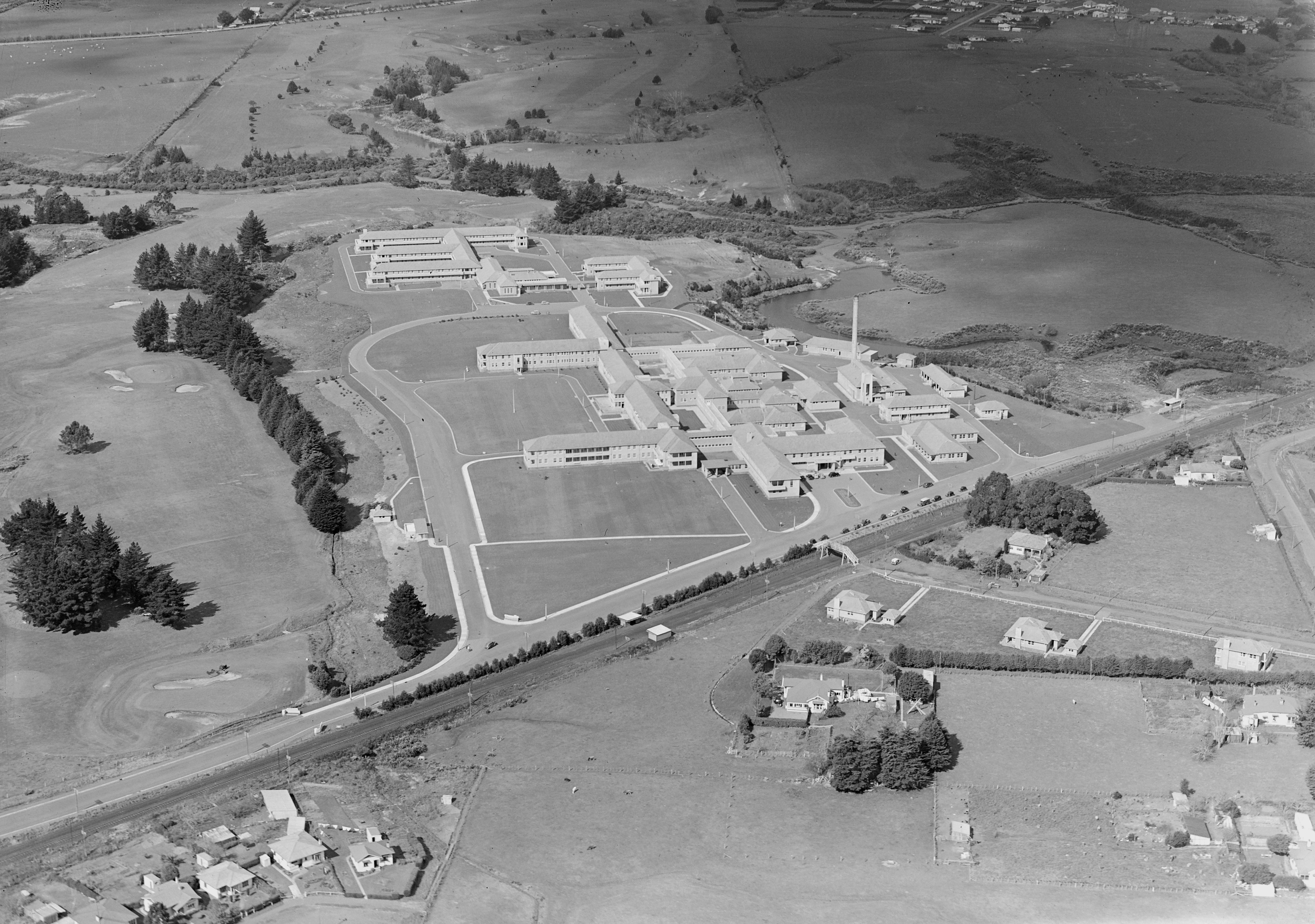
Middlemore hospital and railway station, 16 September 1947

In 1943, during World War II, construction commenced on a 300-bed military hospital on land purchased from the Grange Golf Club. The Auckland Hospital Board decided in 1944 that the hospital would be known as Middlemore Hospital, the name of the Thompson family farm close to where the hospital was built, referencing a family member from the 18th Century.

After the war in the Pacific had ended there was no need for a military hospital, and it was reluctantly purchased by the Board. The hospital officially opened on 3 May 1947. The first patients were 24 returned servicemen.

Dr H.J.A. Colvin was appointed medical superintendent and Miss O.M. Hollan as matron in 1947. A plastic surgery unit was established initially under the surgeons Percy Pickerill and Cecily Pickerill who commuted from Wellington from 1947 to 1950; they were followed by William Manchester (who had trained with Archibald McIndoe), John Peat (an orthodontist), Michael Flint (who had trained with Harold Gillies) and Joan Chapple.

The main hospital site included 10 two-storied wards, the nurses’ home, orderly accommodation block, boiler house, maintenance workshops, a garage and the recreation centre. Household staff quarters and residences for the medical superintendent, Matron, and the house manager were situated on the other side of the railway line. All buildings were timber framed, with pink stucco walls, white trim and had a clay tiled roof. Middlemore railway station opened in July 1947.

A four-storey obstetric block consisting of three 20-bed wards opened in 1961. The large Galbraith block near the railway station opened in 1964, named after Ray Galbraith, secretary of the Auckland Hospital Board, who contributed significantly to the planning and design of the hospital.

A $90 million redevelopment in the 1990s included a new maternity delivery suite which opened in 1996, a short-stay mental health facility opened in 1997, upgraded maternity wards, and upgrade of the Galbraith building.

== Operations ==
Middlemore is operated by Counties Manukau Health, offering tertiary hospital and specialist care, as well as a range of other health and social services, for the population of Counties Manukau. The defined catchment area stretches from Ōtāhuhu to Port Waikato, and has a population of 525,120 people. The population in this area of Auckland continues to expand at a faster rate than the rest of the country (3.2% per year), and this, in conjunction with increasing population age, is expected to require an expansion of inpatient bed numbers to over 1,500 by 2020.

Inpatient services are also provided at several affiliated facilities: Manukau Surgery Centre, Kidz First Children's Hospital, Pukekohe Hospital, Franklin Memorial Hospital, Botany Downs Maternity Unit and Papakura Maternity Unit as well as dedicated mental health and rehabilitation units. Outpatient services are primarily provided at Manukau SuperClinic and Botany SuperClinic. Tertiary specialisations include general surgery, vascular surgery, orthopaedic surgery, oral and maxillofacial surgery, burns and plastic surgery, dentistry, as well as specialised medicine, rehabilitation, renal dialysis, and neonatal intensive care.

== Performance ==
An investigation into the death of a patient in the emergency department on 15 June 2022 concluded that the department was unsafe for both patients and its staff. On that night it was at least 30% over-capacity - but this was “…not an isolated day.” Margie Apa of Te Whatu Ora accepted the conclusions of the report.

== Facilities ==
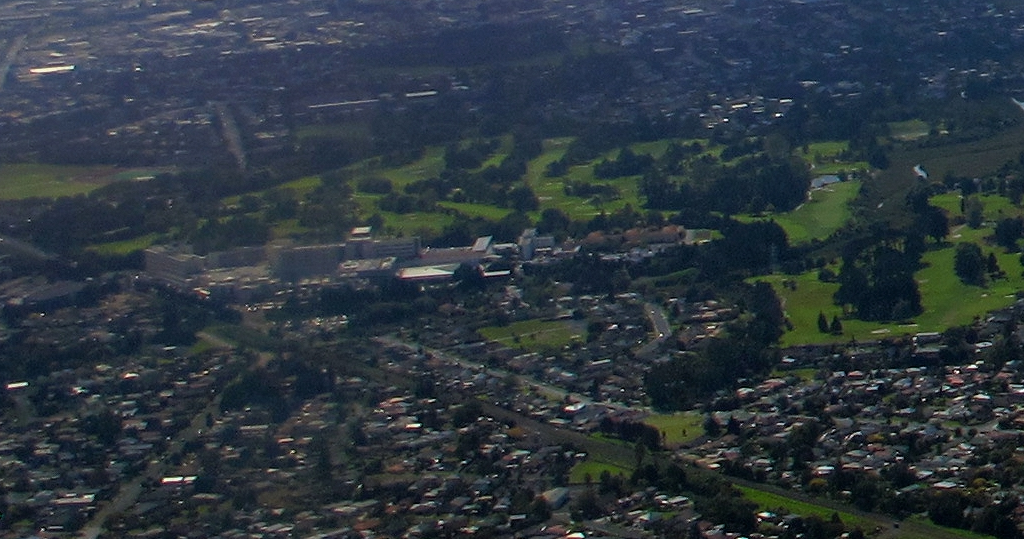
Aerial view of Middlemore Hospital and the surrounding Royal Auckland and Grange Golf Club (2012).

=== New Clinical Services Block (Harley Gray Building) ===
A new five-storey clinical services block was formally opened in April 2014 at a cost of NZ$190 million. This includes: 14 new operating theatres, a 38-cot neonatal care unit, a 42-bed medical assessment unit, a 23-bed post-anaesthetic care unit, a 20-bed theatre admission and discharge unit, and a state-of-the-art central sterile supply department. The building was named after orthopaedic surgeon Harley Gray who was an orthopaedic surgeon at Middlemore until 2001 and was made a Companion of the New Zealand Order of Merit in 2003.

=== Edmund Hillary Block ===
The Edmund Hillary Block is a six-storey in-patient building built in 2009 that added 240 in-patient beds, and 12,600m2 of space to the Middlemore Campus. It included: a 15-bed mental health services for older people ward, a 30 -bed plastics ward, 2 x 30 – bed surgical wards, 2 x 30 – bed medical wards, a 30-bed gastroenterology ward, a cardiac investigation unit, a medical short stay unit, a haematology day ward and clinic, allied health offices and gymnasium, a new staff cafeteria, and the clinical equipment pool and orthotics.

=== Intensive Care Unit ===
In June 2008, a new intensive care unit was commissioned for NZ$6.4 million, described as New Zealand's most advanced. The unit provides 18 beds instead of the previous 7, and capacity will be for treatment of about 1,000 patients per year. The unit also has a shower room to bathe patients confined to their beds as well as two pressure rooms for treatment of patients with transmissible infections (or those especially vulnerable to them). Also improved were the available storage spaces, allowing more room for patients, family and working staff.

=== National Burn Centre ===
In June 2006, the hospital opened its new specialised burns treatment ward, the National Burn Centre. The facility cost NZ$7.2 million to construct and equip, and is the base of operations for the National Burn Service which cares for the most severely burn-injured patients from both the local region and around the country (approx. 400 local and regional burn cases per year).

== Affiliated facilities ==
=== Manukau Surgery Centre ===
The Manukau Surgery Centre provides day surgery services and elective and acute arranged surgery for patients who are not expected to need access to intensive care or interventional radiology. The Surgery Centre has 10 operating theatres, 2 procedure rooms and 78 inpatient beds. Surgery performed includes: orthopaedic surgery including joint replacement; general surgery; colorectal surgery; breast surgery including breast reconstruction; gynaecological procedures; plastic surgery; ORL/ ENT and ophthalmology.

=== Manukau SuperClinic ===
The Manukau SuperClinic™ (MSC) provides specialist outpatient appointments and day procedures. Services provided in each Module are:

- Module 1: Orthopaedics
- Module 2: Anaesthetics Pre-Admission & Laboratory
- Module 3: Otolaryngology (ENT) & Audiology
- Module 4: Paediatric Medicine
- Module 5: Plastic & Hand Surgery
- Module 6: Ophthalmology & Paediatric Ophthalmology
- Module 7: Neurology, General Medicine & Medical Sub-Specialties and Oncology
- Module 8 & 9: General Surgery, Vascular, Breast & Mammography Service and Chronic Pain
- Module 10: Women's Health, Urology & General Surgery Pre-admission

=== Kidz First Children's Hospital ===
The Kidz First Children's Hospital is purpose built to deliver family centred health care and serve the culturally diverse Counties Manukau community.

Services provided at Kidz First Children's Hospital include:

- Paediatric inpatient surgical care – acute and elective orthopaedic, plastics (including specialist Paediatric Burns Unit) and otorhinolaryngeal.
- Paediatric inpatient medical care – acute paediatric specialist medical service.
- Child protection service – medical assessment, consultation, support, education and liaison with all agencies with regards to child abuse/protection issues.

=== South Auckland Clinical Campus ===
The South Auckland Clinical Campus (SACC) based in Middlemore Hospital, is an academic division of The University of Auckland's Faculty of Medical and Health Sciences. The Campus coordinates clinical teaching and research in partnership with the Counties Manukau Health, and has established research groups focusing on Enhanced Recovery After Surgery, Integrated Care, Medical Education, Orthopaedic Surgery, Pacific Women's Health and Plastic Surgery.
