= Alison Rich (academic) =

New Zealand dentistry academic

Alison Rich ONZM
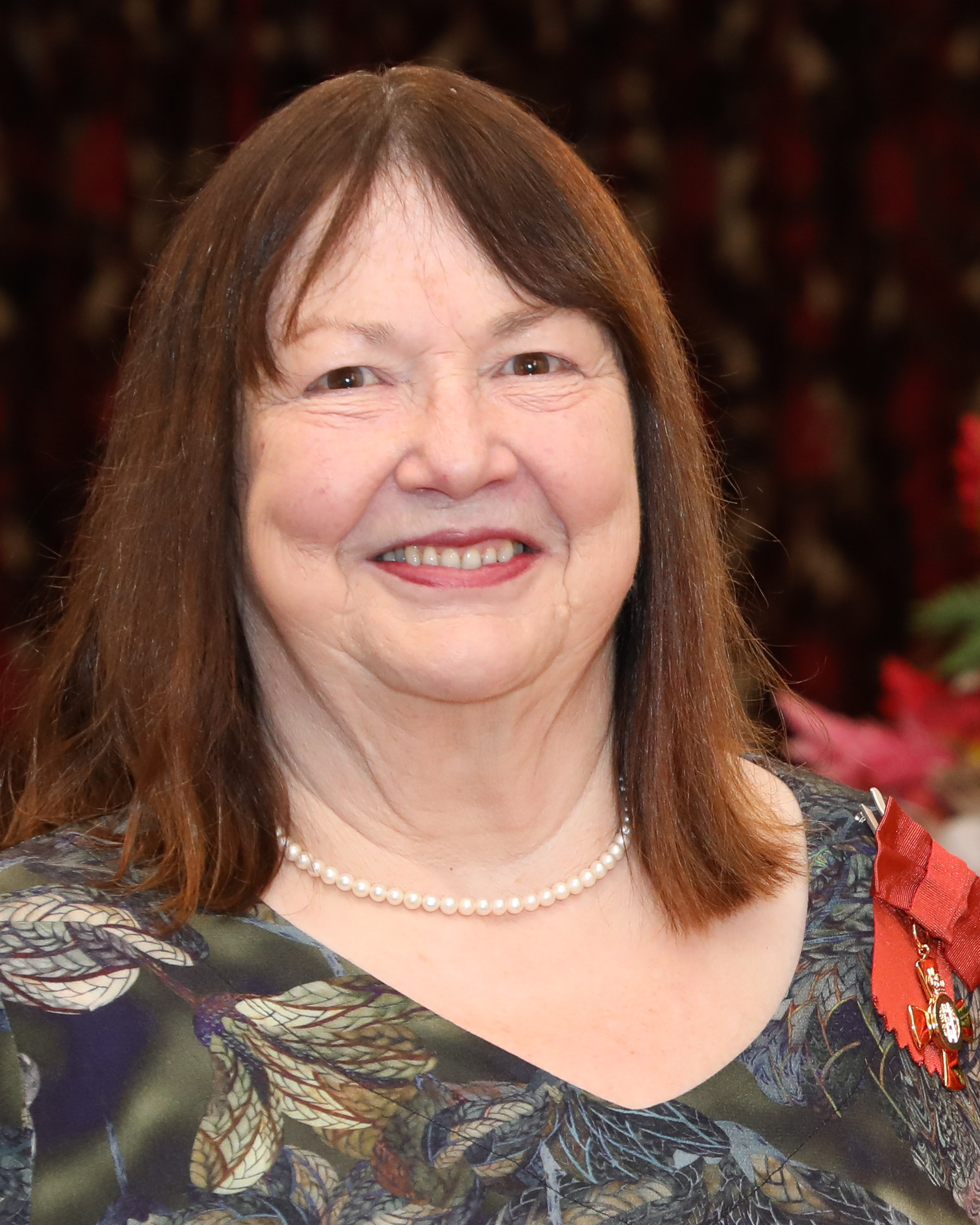
- Rich in 2023
- Education: University of Melbourne
- Scientific career
- Fields: Diagnostic oral pathology
- Workplaces: University of Otago
- Thesis: Histology, histometry and connective tissue influences associated with experimental oral mucosal carcinogenesis (1995)

Alison Mary Rich ONZM is a New Zealand dentistry academic. As of September 2018 she is a full professor and Head of the Department of Oral Diagnostic & Surgical Sciences at the University of Otago.

== Academic career ==
After a 1995 PhD titled Histology, histometry and connective tissue influences associated with experimental oral mucosal carcinogenesis at the University of Melbourne, she moved to the University of Otago, rising to full professor. In 2014, Rich was appointed acting dean of Otago University Faculty of Dentistry.

In 2016, she was made a fellow of the Royal College of Pathologists.

In the 2023 King's Birthday and Coronation Honours, Rich was appointed an Officer of the New Zealand Order of Merit, for services to oral pathology.

== Selected works ==
- Ayers, Kathryn MS, W. Murray Thomson, Alison M. Rich, and J. Timothy Newton. "Gender differences in dentists' working practices and job satisfaction." Journal of dentistry 36, no. 5 (2008): 343–350.
- RICH, ALISON M., and P. C. Reade. "A quantitative assessment of Langerhans cells in oral mucosal lichen planus and leukoplakia." British Journal of Dermatology 120, no. 2 (1989): 223–228.
- Polonowita, Ajith D., Norman A. Firth, and Alison M. Rich. "Verruciform xanthoma and concomitant lichen planus of the oral mucosa. A report of three cases." International Journal of Oral & Maxillofacial Surgery 28, no. 1 (1999): 62–66.
- Oliver, Anthony J., Alison M. Rich, Peter C. Reade, George A. Varigos, and Bryan G. Radden. "Monosodium glutamate-related orofacial granulomatosis: review and case report." Oral surgery, oral medicine, oral pathology 71, no. 5 (1991): 560–564.
- Rich, Alison M., and Duangporn Kerdpon. "p53 expression in oral precancer and cancer." Australian dental journal 44, no. 2 (1999): 103–105.
- Kazantseva M, Hung NA, Mehta S, Roth I, Eiholzer R, Rich AM, Seo B, Baird MA, Braithwaite AW, Slatter TL. Tumor protein 53 mutations are enriched in diffuse large B-cell lymphoma with irregular CD19 marker expression. Scientific Reports. 2017;7.
- Apperley O, Medlicott N, Rich A, Hanning S, Huckabee ML. A clinical trial of a novel emulsion for potential use as a saliva substitute in patients with radiation induced xerostomia. Journal of Oral Rehabilitation. 2017 Jul 25.
- Hussaini HM, Parachuru VP, Seymour GJ, Rich AM. Forkhead box-P3+ regulatory T cells and toll-like receptor 2 co-expression in oral squamous cell carcinoma. Acta Histochemica. 2017 Apr 30;119(3):205-10.
