= Charles Hercus =

New Zealand doctor and professor of public health (1888–1971)

Sir Charles Hercus DSO OBE VD
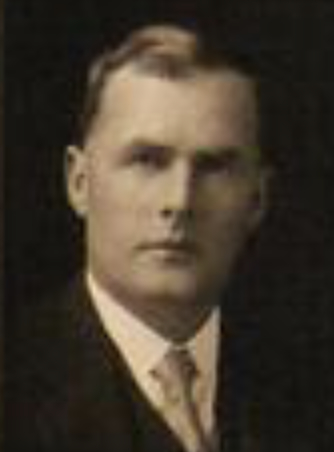
- Born: Charles Ernest Hercus; 13 June 1888; Dunedin, New Zealand
- Died: 6 March 1971 (aged 82); Dunedin, New Zealand
- Occupations: Doctor; public health academic; university administrator

Academic background
- Education: University of Otago

Academic work
- Discipline: Public health
- Institutions: University of Otago

Sir Charles Ernest Hercus DSO OBE VD (13 June 1888 – 26 March 1971) was a New Zealand doctor and professor of public health. He served as dean of the University of Otago Dunedin School of Medicine from 1937 to 1958.

== Biography ==
Hercus was born in Dunedin on 13 June 1888. He was in the first class at the Otago Dental School and completed his BDS in 1911, before also completing MB ChB degrees in 1914, MD in 1921, and DPH in 1922. He served in World War I at Gallipoli and the Middle East, rising to rank of major in the New Zealand Mounted Rifles Field Ambulance from January 1917.

Hercus married Isabella Rea Jones at Johnsonville on 6 February 1923, and the couple went on to have four children.

Hercus was the professor of public health and bacteriology at the University of Otago from 1922 and 1955, and professor of preventive and social medicine between 1955 and 1958. He served as sub-dean of the Otago Medical School between 1924 and 1936, and dean of the Otago Medical School from 1937 to 1958.

Hercus died in Dunedin on 26 March 1971.

== Honours and awards ==
In recognition of his military service during World War I, Hercus was appointed a Companion of the Distinguished Service Order in the 1918 King's Birthday Honours, and an Officer of the Order of the British Empire in the 1919 King's Birthday Honours. Hercus was appointed a Knight Bachelor in the 1947 New Year Honours, and in 1953 he was awarded the Queen Elizabeth II Coronation Medal. In 1962, he was conferred an honorary Doctor of Laws degree by the University of Otago.

Hercus was a Fellow of the Royal Australasian College of Physicians, the Royal Australasian College of Surgeons, the Royal College of Physicians of Edinburgh and the Royal College of Physicians.

== Honorific eponym ==
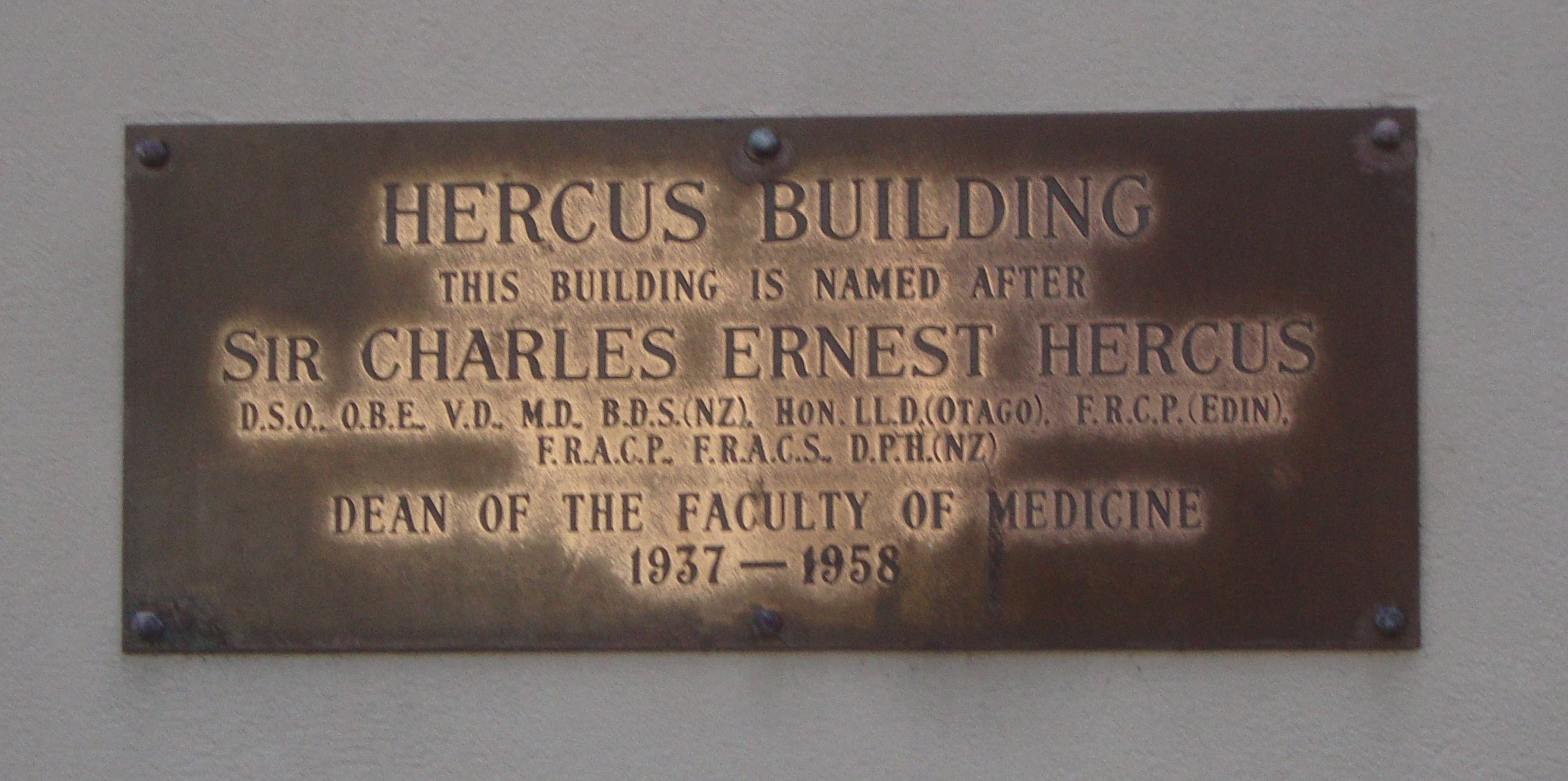
Hercus Building plaque

The Hercus Building, part of the University of Otago Dunedin School of Medicine, on the corner of Great King and Hanover Streets, is named for Hercus.

The Health Research Council of New Zealand offers an annual Sir Charles Hercus Health Research Fellowship, worth up to NZ$600,000 "for emerging scientists who have demonstrated outstanding potential to develop into highly skilled researchers able to initiate new avenues of investigation", in his honour. The Royal Society Te Apārangi awards the Hercus Medal for excellence in molecular and cellular sciences, biomedical science or clinical science and public health every two years.
