= James Manning =

James Manning may refer to:

- James Manning (minister) (1738–1791), American Baptist minister and first president of Brown University
- James Manning (lawyer) (1781–1866), English barrister, serjeant-at-law, and law writer
- James S. Manning (1859–1938), Associate Justice of the North Carolina Supreme Court
- Jim Manning (baseball, born 1862) (1862–1929), American professional baseball player, manager and team owner
- James Manning (scientist) (1917–1989), surgeon, pathologist and public health administrator
- Jim Manning (pitcher) (1943–2020), American Major League Baseball pitcher
- James David Manning (born 1947), chief pastor at the ATLAH World Missionary Church
- James Manning (architect), English-born architect and builder, active in Perth, Western Australia
- James Manning Jr., Oregon state senator
- James Hilton Manning (1854–1925), American newspaper publisher, businessman and mayor of Albany
- J. L. Manning (James Lionel Manning), British sports columnist
- James Manning, character in Almost Married
