= Barrer (disambiguation) =

- François Barrer – French long-distance runner
- Richard Barrer – New Zealand chemist (1910–1996)
- Nina Agatha Rosamond Barrer – New Zealand teacher and community leader (1879 -1965)
