= Farquhar Wilkinson =

New Zealand cellist (1932–2022)

Farquhar Wilkinson QSM
- Born: Farquhar Davis Wilkinson; 20 April 1932; Oamaru, New Zealand
- Died: 25 October 2022 (aged 90) Blenheim, New Zealand
- Genres: Classical
- Occupation: Cellist
- Instrument: Cello
- Formerly of: New Zealand Symphony Orchestra (1953–1992); Alex Lindsay String Orchestra (1961–1973)
- Spouse: Barbara Gwendoline Welch (m. 1954; died 2017)

Farquhar Davis Wilkinson QSM (20 April 1932 – 25 October 2022) was a New Zealand classical cellist. He was principal cellist with the New Zealand Symphony Orchestra from 1955 to 1992.

== Early life and family ==
Wilkinson was born in Oamaru on 20 April 1932, the son of George Ernest Wilkinson and Vera Maud Wilkinson (née Flamank). The family moved to Dunedin, where George Wilkinson taught music at the Dunedin Teachers' College, and Farquhar began learning to play the cello when he was five years old; with Miss Ethel Frye as his teacher, he passed the grade 1 cello examination of the Associated Board of the Royal Schools of Music with distinction in 1941. He gained a diploma as an Associate of Trinity College London (ATCL) in cello in 1948.

From 1945 to 1948, Wilkinson was educated at Otago Boys' High School. He gained entry to the Royal College of Music in London, and travelled there in 1949 to further his cello studies.

In 1954, Wilkinson married Barbara Gwendoline Welch, and the couple went on to have five daughters.

== Career ==
After graduating from the Royal College of Music, Wilkinson played with the Sadler's Wells Ballet for a time, before returning to New Zealand where he joined the National Orchestra of the New Zealand Broadcasting Service—now called the New Zealand Symphony Orchestra (NZSO)—in 1953. Two years later he became the orchestra's principal cellist, in which role he continued until retiring in 1992. During that period, he was a cello tutor for the New Zealand National Youth Orchestra, and played regularly with the Alex Lindsay String Orchestra as principal cellist between 1961 and 1973.

Throughout his career, Wilkinson was active in chamber music. He played with the Rosner Chamber Music Ensemble in 1955. In 1958, he was part of the Malcolm Latchem String Quartet that won the Judith Bagnall Prize for string quartet playing. The quartet, led by Malcolm Latchem who had moved to New Zealand and joined the National Orchestra in 1956, subsequently toured New Zealand. After Latchem returned to England the following year, Wilkinson became part of the newly formed Aspey String Quartet, led by Vincent Aspey. In 1961, Wilkinson was a founding member of the New Zealand String Quartet, led by Alex Lindsay, which toured throughout New Zealand and undertook extensive broadcasting work.

In 1964, Wilkinson was an inaugural recipient of a study bursary from the New Zealand Broadcasting Corporation that enabled members of the New Zealand Symphony Orchestra to study overseas for six months. He travelled to Britain in January 1965, stopping in Hong Kong where he performed on television. In London, he played with the London Symphony Orchestra, and made a two-week concert tour with the orchestra that included the Prague Spring Festival. He also undertook advanced study with William Pleeth, observed master classes by Nadia Boulanger, and did freelance playing with various London orchestras.

Towards the end of his career with the NZSO, Wilkinson was awarded the Queen's Service Medal, for public services, in the 1991 New Year Honours.

== Later life and death ==
After retiring from the NZSO, Wilkinson moved to Waikawa Bay, near Picton. He died in Blenheim on 25 October 2022, aged 90. He had been predeceased by his wife, Barbara, in 2017.
