= 1959 New Year Honours (New Zealand) =

Annual awards for New Zealanders

The 1959 New Year Honours in New Zealand were appointments by Elizabeth II on the advice of the New Zealand government to various orders and honours to reward and highlight good works by New Zealanders. The awards celebrated the passing of 1958 and the beginning of 1959, and were announced on 1 January 1959.

The recipients of honours are displayed here as they were styled before their new honour.

== Knight Bachelor ==
- The Honourable James Douglas Hutchison – of Wellington; senior puisne judge of the Supreme Court.

== Order of Saint Michael and Saint George ==
=== Companion (CMG) ===
- Walter Horrobin – of Waikanae. For services to farming, especially as chairman of the New Zealand Wool Board.

== Royal Victorian Order ==
=== Knight Commander (KCVO) ===
- Arthur Grant Harper CVO CBE. For services in connection with royal visits to New Zealand.

== Order of the British Empire ==
=== Knight Commander (KBE) ===
Civil division

- Geoffrey Sylvester Peren CBE – of Palmerston North. For services to agriculture, especially as principal of Massey Agricultural College.
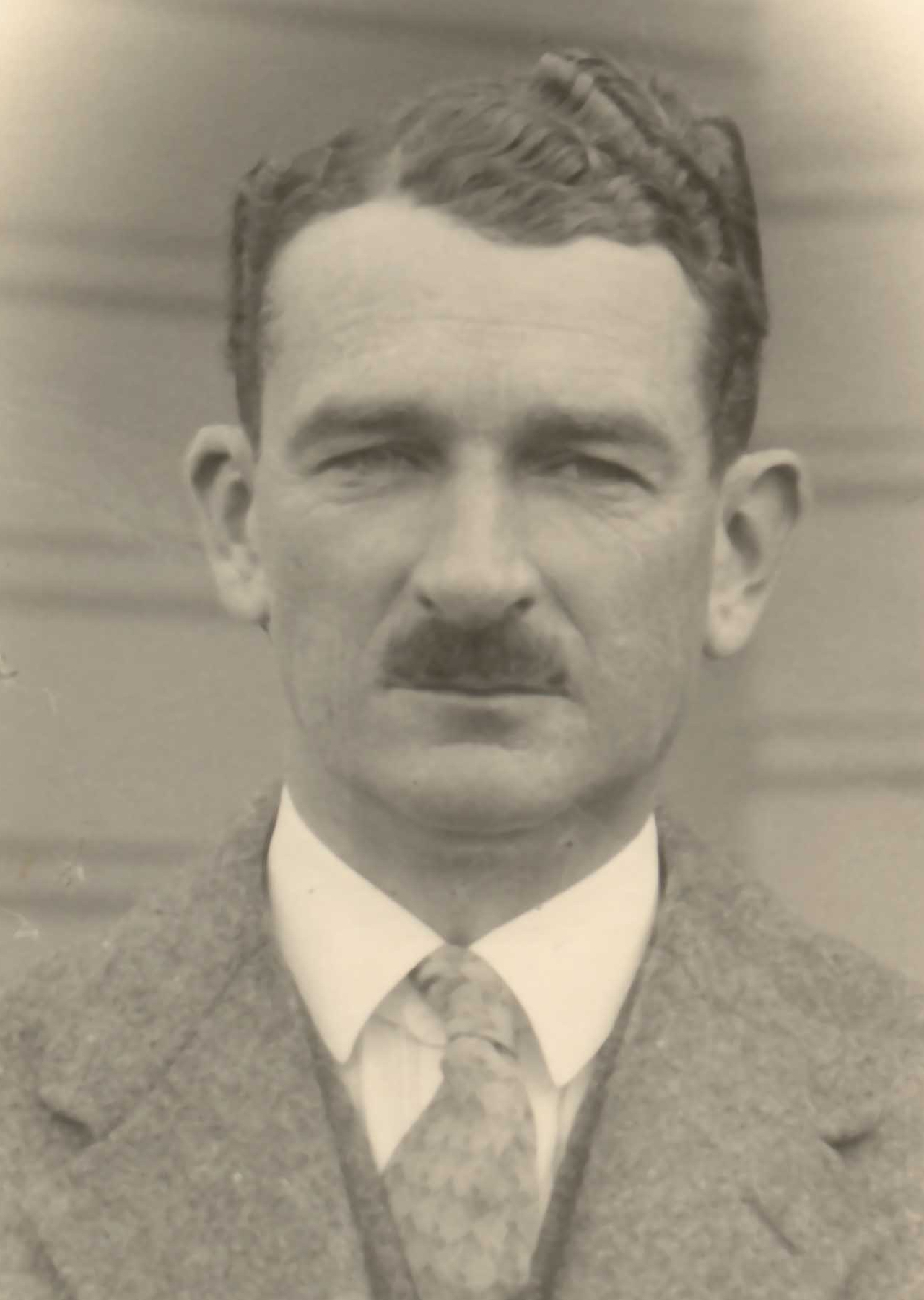
Sir Geoffrey Peren

=== Commander (CBE) ===
Civil division

- Dr Muriel Emma Bell (Mrs Hefford) MD – of Dunedin; nutritionist to the Department of Health and supervisor of the Nutrition Research Department of the Medical Research Council.
- Malcolm McRae Burns – of Lincoln; director of the Canterbury Agricultural College.
- Ira James Cunningham – of Upper Hutt; superintendent of the Animal Research Station, Wallaceville.
- Robert Brown Tennent – of Auckland; Director of Agriculture.

Military division

- Brigadier James Thomas Burrows DSO ED – Colonels' List (Regular Force), New Zealand Army.
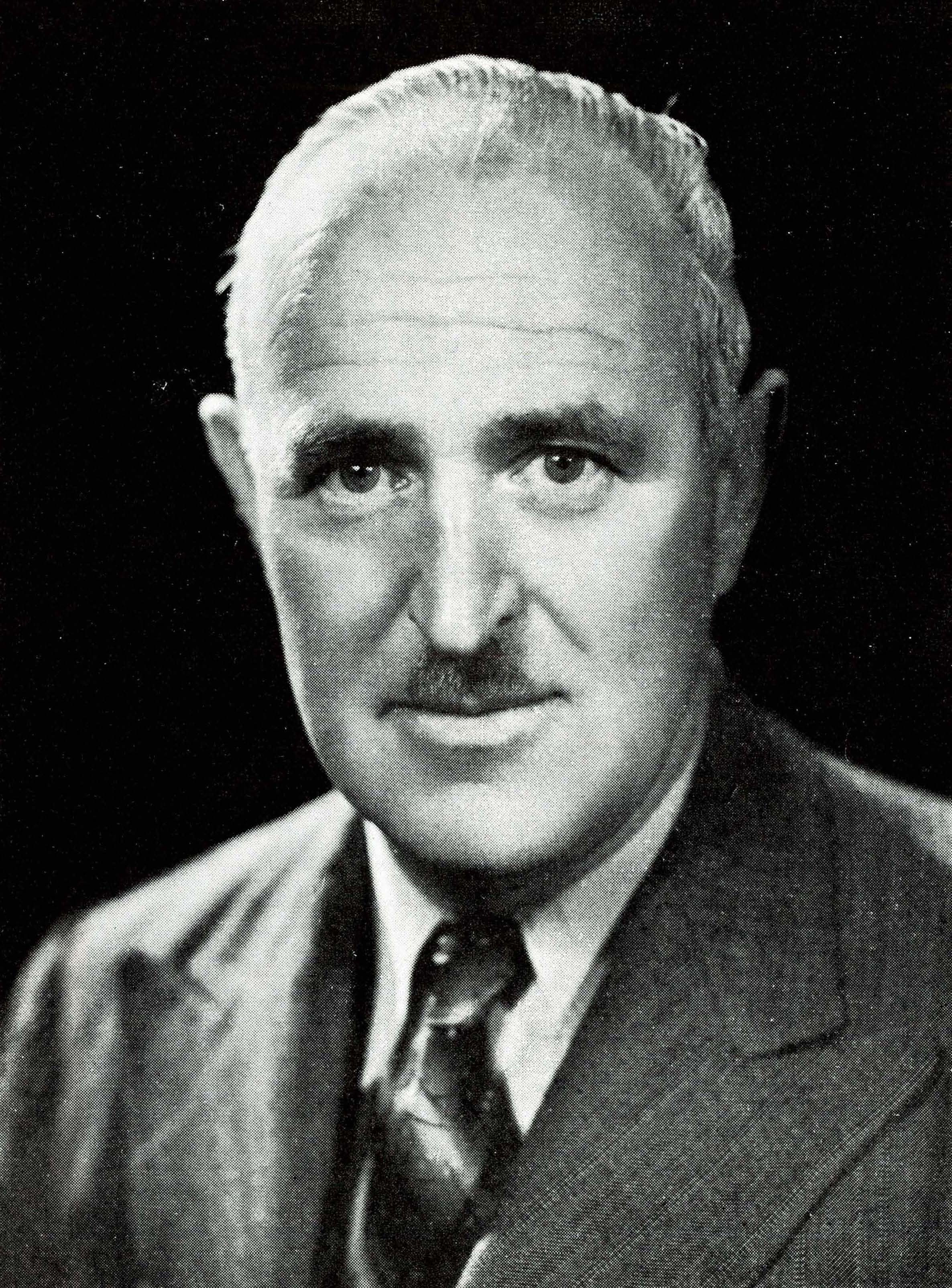
Malcolm Burns

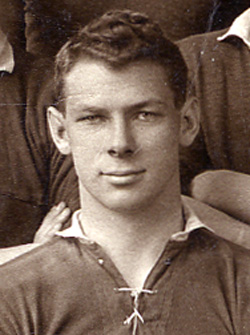
Jim Burrows

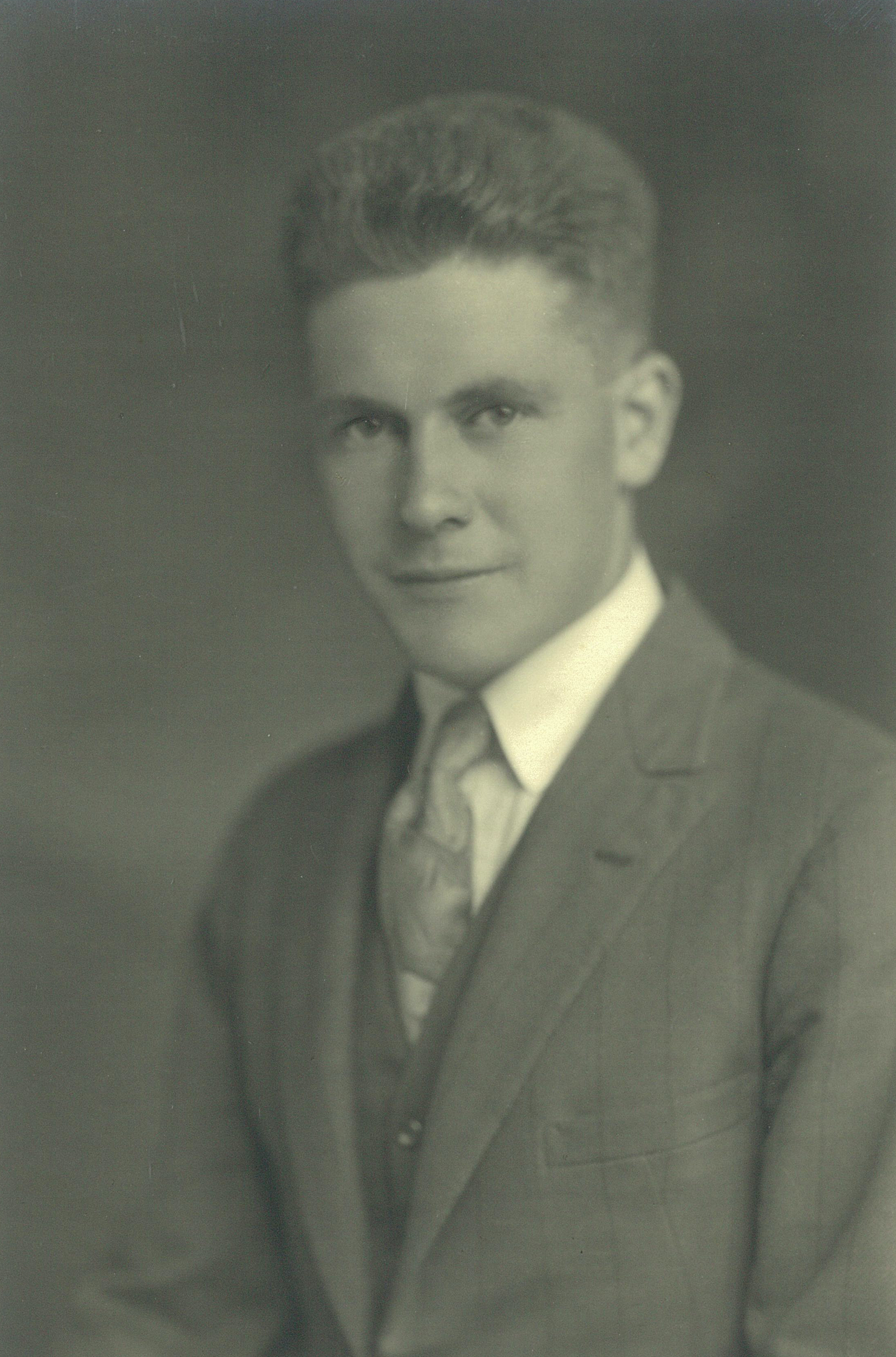
Ira Cunningham

=== Officer (OBE) ===
Civil division

- George Frederick Briggs – of Wellington; national secretary of the Young Men's Christian Association of New Zealand.
- Robert Donald Cowie JP – of Auckland; president of the Auckland Returned Services' Association.
- Oliver Duff – of Christchurch. For services to literature and journalism.
- Herbert Stanley Feast JP – town clerk, Christchurch.
- Campbell Larnach MacDiarmid – of Hamilton. For services to social-welfare bodies.
- Herbert Alfred Newall – of Dunedin. For services to social welfare organisations.
- Arthur Montague Ongley – Crown prosecutor, Palmerston North.
- Francis Brian Shorland – of Wellington; director of the Fats Research Laboratory.
- Hetekia Te Gani Te Ua – of Puha. For services to the Māori people.

Military division

- Commander Allister Barclay Gilfillan VRD – Royal New Zealand Navy (Retired).
- Lieutenant-Colonel Sinclair Banks Wallace – Royal New Zealand Electrical and Mechanical Engineers (Regular Force).
- Wing Commander Albert Clement Anderson – Royal New Zealand Air Force.

=== Member (MBE) ===
Civil division

- Aileen Mary Andersen – of Napier. For services to the community.
- Stanley Robert Banyard – of Auckland; welfare officer, Auckland Prison, 1948–1957; a member of the Auckland City Mission of the Church of England Men's Society.
- Nina Agatha Rosamond Barrer – of Masterton. For services to the community in the field of education and in women's activities.
- Lawrence Drake Bridge – of Wellington. For services to the Federated Mountains Clubs Search and Rescue Organisation.
- Edith Campion – of Wellington. For services to drama, especially in the establishment of the New Zealand Players Theatrical Society.
- Jean Evelyn Castle – of Auckland. For services to wives and families of naval personnel.
- Clarence Coxall – of Reefton. For services to local government, especially as chairman of the Inangahua County Council.
- The Reverend John Harold Datson – of Wanganui. For services to the community.
- Henry Francis Louis Delamar JP – of Ohakune; in recognition of services as mayor of Ohakune and district coroner.
- Matthew Thomas Franich – of Dargaville. For services to the community in North Auckland.
- Hoki Waiheke Hui – of Auckland. For services to the Māori people.
- Alex Sylvester Lindsay – of Pāuatahanui. For services to music, especially orchestral work.
- Helen Sydney Butler Lusk – of Titirangi. For services to nursing.
- Mary Cecile MacCormick – of Auckland. For services to the Red Cross Society, especially as secretary of the Auckland branch.
- Hannah Martin – of Wellington. For services to the Young Women's Christian Association.
- John Patterson – of Waitangi; formerly resident commissioner, Chatham Islands.
- Lorna Ina Ranby – of Waitoa. For services in the interests of intellectually handicapped children.
- Ivy Beatrice Ritchie – town clerk, Arrowtown.

Military division

- Warrant Officer First Class Leslie John Auty – Royal Regiment of New Zealand Artillery (Regular Force).
- Major Henry Herbert Bunckenburg ED – Royal New Zealand Army Medical Corps (Territorial Force).
- Major Richard Herbert Dyson ED – Royal Regiment of New Zealand Artillery (Regular Force).
- Warrant Officer First Class Ronald Walter Hicks EM – Corps of Royal New Zealand Engineers (Territorial Force).
- Major Bryan Henry Palmer ED – Royal New Zealand Infantry Corps (Territorial Force).
- Flight Lieutenant Henry Maitland Eccersall – Royal New Zealand Air Force.
- Warrant Officer Thomas Francis Fountaine – Royal New Zealand Air Force.

== British Empire Medal (BEM) ==
Military division

- Chief Petty Officer Arthur Alexander Howard Brush – Royal New Zealand Navy.
- Chief Petty Officer Telegraphist Geoffrey Roger Drew – Royal New Zealand Navy.
- Chief Engine Room Artificer Ernest Alfred Payne – Royal New Zealand Navy.
- Chief Petty Officer Berwick Claud Raoul Whitcombe – Royal New Zealand Naval Volunteer Reserve.
- Chief Petty Officer Writer Alexander McWilliams – Royal New Zealand Navy.
- Warrant Officer 2nd Class (temporary) Robert John McCombe – Royal New Zealand Corps of Signals (Territorial Force).
- Staff-Sergeant Desmond Dynes Sharp – Royal New Zealand Armoured Corps (Regular Force).
- Warrant Officer 2nd Class (temporary) James Robert Upton – New Zealand Regiment (Regular Force).

== Air Force Cross (AFC) ==
- Flight Lieutenant John Clark Buckmaster – Royal New Zealand Air Force.

== Queen's Fire Services Medal (QFSM) ==
- Harry Bruce – chief fire officer, Wellington Fire Brigade.
- Douglas Stevans Butcher – deputy chief fire officer, Stratford Volunteer Fire Brigade.

== Queen's Commendation for Valuable Service in the Air ==
- Flight Lieutenant Donald McFarland Stark – Royal New Zealand Air Force.
