= Claude Haydon =

Australian-born New Zealand composer, musician and teacher

- Born: 8 November 1884; South Yarra, Melbourne, Australia
- Died: 25 July 1960 (aged 75); Silverstream, New Zealand
- Occupations: Composer, musician, teacher
- Spouse: Lily Edith Hall (m. 1930)

Claude Meurisse Haydon (8 November 1884 – 25 July 1960) was an Australian-born New Zealand composer, musician and teacher.

== Early life ==
Haydon was born on 8 November 1884 in South Yarra in Melbourne in Australia, the son of Harry Haydon, a school teacher and later Treasurer and then Secretary of the Melbourne Harbour Trust, and Amicie Meurisse, who was French. Harry Haydon died of typhoid fever on 14 April 1900. The household included a German governess, so Haydon and his brother and sister grew up speaking English, French and German. They were later to share their parents’ intellectual, literary and artistic interests.

== Education ==
Haydon’s early training was devoted to languages, literature and music in all of its branches. He trained at the Melbourne Conservatorium of Music, and in 1911 he gained the degree of Bachelor of Music. Haydon’s teachers, all well-known Melbourne musicians, were H. A. Thomson (a pupil of Theodor Leschetizky); Dr. A. E. Lloyd; and Dr. W. G. Price.

== Compositions ==
In time, Hayden became known as "a composer of thoughtful and beautiful chamber music of various kinds". A composition that helped gain Haydon recognition was a Phastasie [sic] Trio for Violin, Cello and Piano. The work that eclipsed all his others was a five-act "romantic grand opera", Paolo and Francesca. It was based on Edward A. Vidler’s play Rose of Ravenna which was an elaboration of the episode of Francesca da Rimini in the fifth canto of Dante’s Inferno and was performed at the Melbourne Playhouse on 6 and 7 May 1920. The work was warmly received to relatively minor criticism. A recital of excerpts was organised by the Australian Institute of Arts and Literature on 6 October 1923 in the Queens Hall in Melbourne.

== Move to New Zealand and subsequent music career ==
In 1920, Haydon came to New Zealand with his mother and sister, when his sister was appointed Principal to Queen Margaret College, Wellington. They settled in Lower Hutt. As a teacher of counterpoint, harmony and piano, Haydon began to attract pupils.

On 7 July 1926, Paolo and Francesca was presented in the Concert Chamber of the Wellington Town Hall, performed by the Wellington Harmonic Society under its conductor Harold Temple White. Due to mixed reviews, a second performance took place on 24 July 1926.

Haydon’s compositions, which he occasionally succeeded in having broadcast, covered a vast range – choral items, instrumental and piano pieces, and songs. Manuscripts include two oratorios: The Gift (1932) and a sacred cantata called Life through His Name (1946); an undated Victory Piano Concerto, and three symphonies: Symphony in G minor (composed in 1936, orchestrated 1951–1952), an undated Waterloo Symphony, and an undated Australian Jubilee Symphony. In 1953, Haydon was commissioned by the New Zealand Broadcasting Service to compose a Coronation Ode. It was completed but the Broadcasting Service changed its mind and did not want it. The rejection left a deep and lasting scar. The most ambitious of Haydon’s later undertakings was an unfinished opera, The Golden Sword.

Haydon’s pupils included the composer Robert Burch and Sydney Josland.

== Personal life and death ==
Haydon had intended to become a concert pianist but disease led to the amputation of his left leg in 1917. Haydon married one of his pupils, Lily Edith Hall, in 1930. She too, taught the piano. Haydon died at Silverstream on 25 July 1960 at the age of 75. His widow presented all his manuscripts to the Alexander Turnbull Library in Wellington.

== See also ==
- Melbourne Conservatorium of Music
- Harold Temple White

== Sources ==
- Commons, Jeremy (1992). "Claude Meurisse Haydon (1884 – 1960). The Operatic Ventures". Music in New Zealand (Spring 1992/Number 18): 48.
- Thomson, John Mansfield (1990). "Haydon, Claude". Biographical dictionary of New Zealand composers. Wellington: Victoria University Press. pp. 75–76. ISBN 0 86473 095 0.
- New Zealand Listener (10 December 1954). "Claude Haydon". p. 29.
