= Ira Cunningham =

New Zealand scientist

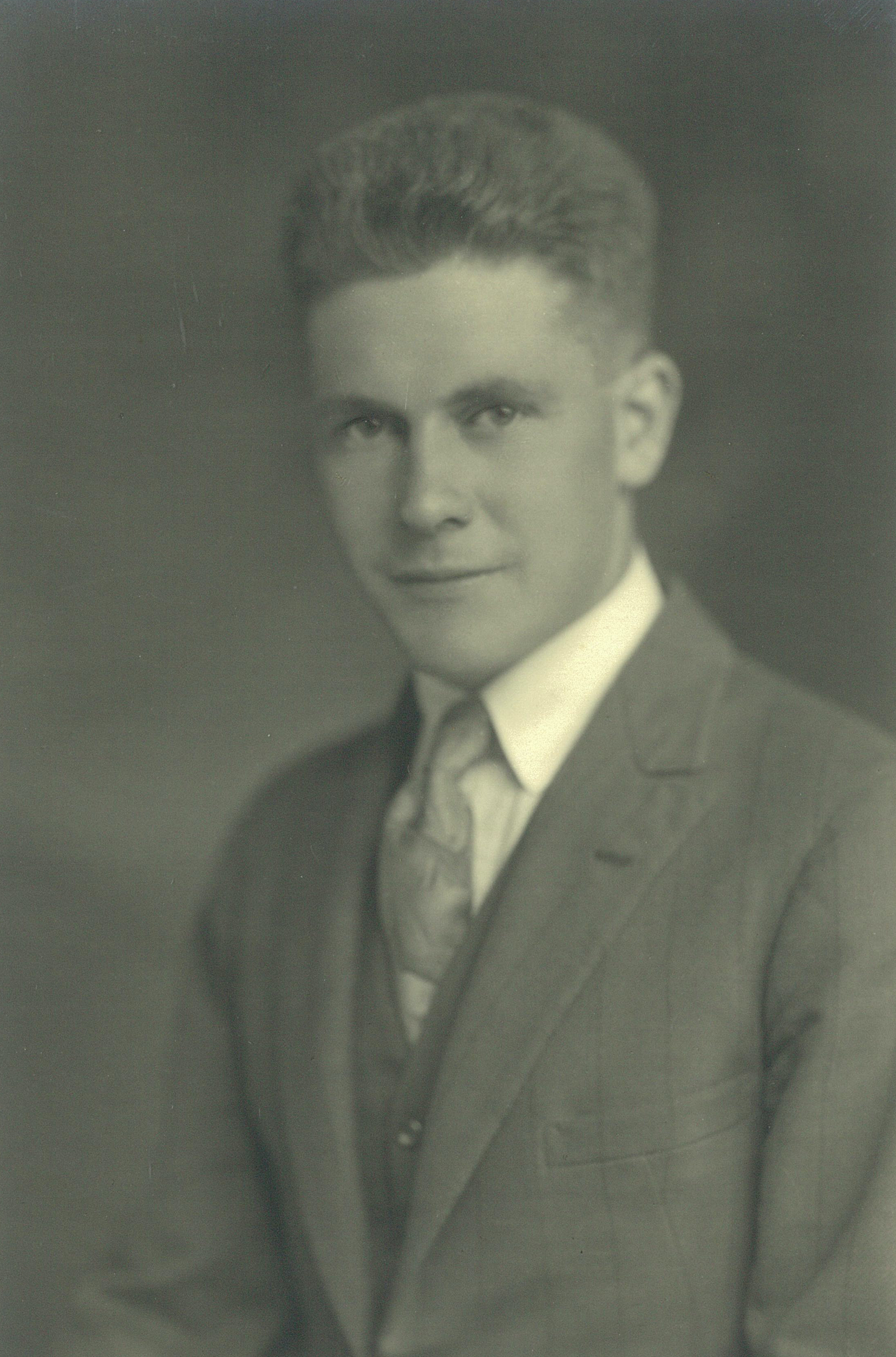
Cunningham, c. 1929

Ira James Cunningham CBE (1905–1971) was a New Zealand researcher in trace element nutrition and animal science. He is best remembered as a past president of the New Zealand Veterinary Association.

== Biography ==
=== Early years ===
Cunningham was born at Mangatainoka in the Wairarapa in New Zealand on 16 August 1905. He was dux of Dannevirke High School and later took a position as a cadet in the chemical laboratory of the Department of Agriculture in Wellington. While at the department, Cunningham studied part-time at Victoria University College.

In 1928, he graduated with a Bachelor of Science degree, and in 1929 with a Master's of Science with first-class honours in Chemistry.

In 1929, Cunningham attended the Rowett Research Institute at the University of Aberdeen in Scotland and this marked the beginning of his lifelong interest in trace element nutrition. He returned to New Zealand with a PhD in copper metabolism to become a research officer in animal nutrition at Wallaceville Veterinary Laboratory in Upper Hutt.

Cunningham then attended the University of Sydney and gained a Bachelor of Veterinary Science (BVSc).

=== Career ===
Upon his return to Wallaceville, he was appointed chief biochemist and section leader and concentrated on his main work of improving livestock production.

In 1945, with the support of John Filmer, director of the Animal Research Division of the Department of Agriculture, Cunningham became superintendent of the Wallaceville station. He was in charge of Wallaceville from 1945 to 1958. The bacteriologist Sydney Josland worked under the direction of Cunningham at Wallaceville until he left to commence employment at the National Health Institute in Wellington in 1954.

Cunningham became Assistant Director General of Agriculture in 1958 and his services to agriculture were recognised in the 1959 New Year Honours when he was appointed a Commander of the Order of the British Empire. The degree of DSc was conferred upon Cunningham the same year by Victoria University of Wellington for his research on copper metabolism, and he received an honorary DVSc from the University of Melbourne in 1967.

In 1962, Cunningham was appointed as foundation dean of the Faculty of Veterinary Science at Massey Agricultural College in Palmerston North.

Cunningham was made a fellow of the Royal Society of New Zealand in 1963 and was awarded the Society's Hector Memorial Medal and Prize in 1971. Among elected offices Cunningham held were those of chairman of the Veterinary Surgeons' Board, president of the New Zealand Veterinary Association and New Zealand Society of Animal Production.

=== Death and legacy ===
Cunningham died at Palmerston North, New Zealand on 28 August 1971.
