= John Walsh (dentist) =

New Zealand dentist and academic (1911–2003)

Sir John Walsh KBE FRSNZ
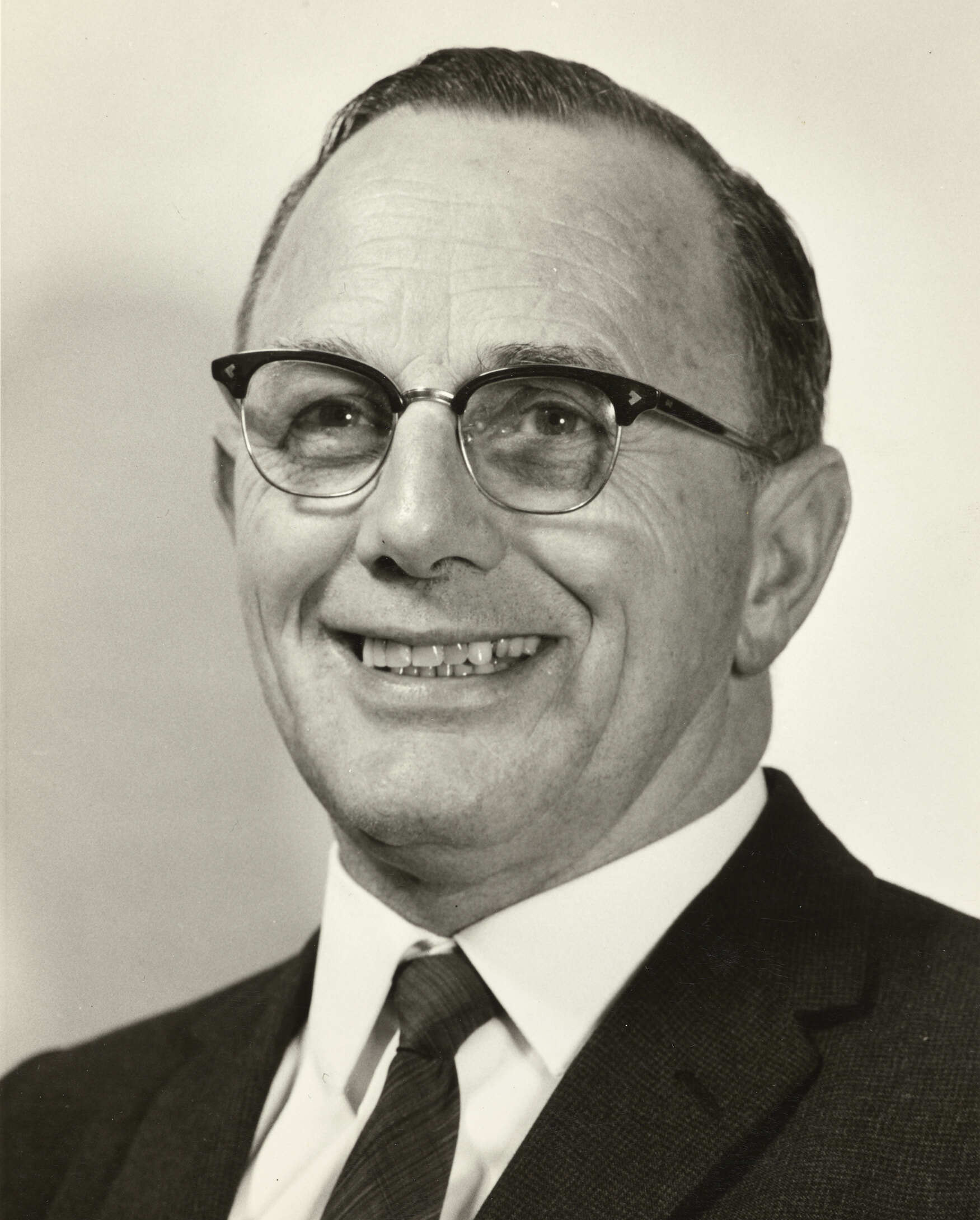
- Walsh in the 1960s
- Born: 5 July 1911; Melbourne, Victoria, Australia
- Died: 22 August 2003 (aged 92); Auckland, New Zealand
- Spouse: Enid Morris (m. 1934; died 1993)
- Children: 4
- Relatives: Elizabeth Hanan (daughter)
- Awards: Fellow of the Royal Society Te Apārangi, Knight Commander of the Order of the British Empire, Fellow of the Australian College of Dental Surgeons, FDSRCS England, Queen Elizabeth II Coronation Medal, honorary degree, honorary doctor of the University of Otago

Academic background
- Education: University of Melbourne
- Thesis: Vibration sensibility in teeth and its association with cavity preparation (1949)

Sir John Patrick Walsh KBE FRSNZ (5 July 1911 – 22 August 2003) was an Australian–New Zealand dental academic. Born in Australia, Walsh trained as a dental mechanic, and then completed degrees in dentistry and medicine at the University of Melbourne. He was appointed Dean of New Zealand's dental school at the University of Otago in 1946, where he oversaw the introduction of training in paediatric dentistry, orthodontics and public health dentistry. Walsh campaigned for improved facilities at the dental school and the new building, opened in 1961, was named in his honour in 2001. He is remembered for his development of a high-speed dental drill and a successful campaign for fluoridation of the public water supply.

== Early life and education ==
Walsh was born on 5 July 1911 in Melbourne, Australia. Walsh was the eldest child of five children born to working-class parents Lillian, a cleaner, and John, who worked as a waiter, and who Walsh later said was an alcoholic and suffered from tuberculosis.

Walsh attended St Kilda Primary School in Melbourne, and from the age of 12, Prahran Technical School. After a visit to the dentist when he was around 14, Walsh was offered an apprenticeship as a dental mechanic by the dentist, Ted Whitford. He completed his School Certificate and most of his University Entrance through two years of night classes, but took two attempts to pass Latin. Walsh was unemployed when he completed his apprenticeship at 18, and proceeded to set up his own dental mechanic business from the family home, purchasing second-hand equipment and a bicycle for making deliveries. In 1931, Walsh's parents separated, and he moved with his mother and siblings and laboratory equipment to another address in Melbourne. A chance encounter with the secretary of the Dental Board led to Walsh applying for a bursary to attend the University of Melbourne dental school, beginning in 1932. After his first year, when he was top of his class, Walsh obtained a scholarship to Ormond College. Walsh graduated with first class honours in dentistry in 1936. He tutored at the University of Melbourne, and worked as a registrar at the dental hospital and as a locum before enrolling to study medicine. During his medical degree he opened a dental practice, and specialised in oral surgery and anaesthesia. At the time it was common for people to choose to have all their teeth extracted in early adulthood, in favour of wearing dentures, for the avoidance of later pain and cost. Walsh was concerned at the number of extractions he had to perform.

== Career ==
Walsh completed his Bachelor of Medicine and Bachelor of Surgery in February 1943, and then worked as a house surgeon and registrar at the Alfred Hospital in Melbourne. During this time he also completed the first part of a Master of Dental Science degree. During WWII, Walsh served as a medical officer and consultant oral surgeon in the Royal Australian Air Force. During the course of his service, he was posted to Adelaide, where he conducted audiometry examinations on returned servicemen. Walsh noted, through the application of the tuning fork to his own teeth, that there were certain frequencies at which the tuning fork caused painful vibrations, but that higher frequencies were less unpleasant. While in Adelaide, Walsh applied for the position of Professor of Dentistry and Dean of the University of Otago Dental School, which was made vacant after the retirement of Professor Bevan Dodds.

Walsh arrived at the University of Otago as a 34-year-old self-described "brash Australian" in February 1946. Walsh commented publicly on the poor state of New Zealand dental health, describing the "denture face" that follows from early complete tooth extraction and poorly fitted dentures. Walsh conducted a survey in 1950 which found that three quarters of New Zealand adults aged 40–49 wore partial or full dentures. Much of the work of the dental school was in extractions and the creation of prostheses. Walsh was keen to improve prevention of disease and enable research into causes of dental disease and improved treatments. His initial report laid out his top priority, a new Dental School building, as the existing building had inadequate sanitary arrangements, and no space for research, paediatric dentistry or a diagnostic clinic.

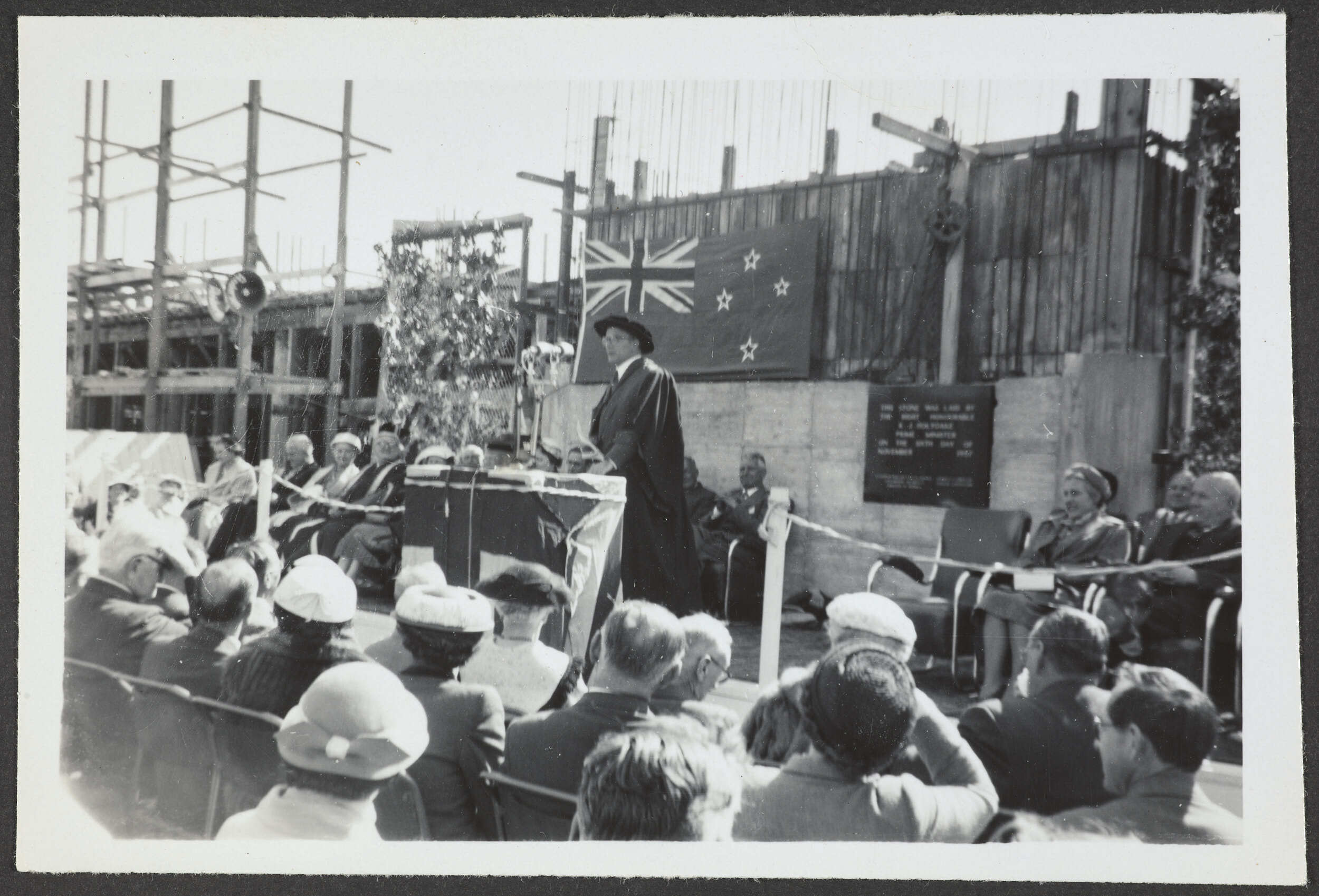
John Walsh at the foundation stone ceremony for the Otago Dental School in 1957

Over ten weeks in 1949, Walsh undertook a tour of seventeen dental schools and research centres in the US and Canada, funded by a grant from the Carnegie Foundation. The tour confirmed Walsh's view that a new dental school was a necessity, and reinforced his views on the importance of research and dental education. Over the next several years, as Walsh expanded the staff of the school to cope with increased student enrolments, overcrowding was worsened, and Walsh's aim of providing training for professionals already in practice was required to wait. Walsh introduced training in children's dentistry, orthodontics and public-health dentistry. The new dental school was officially opened in 1961.

Fluoridation of drinking water had been introduced in New Zealand in Hastings in 1954. Many staff and students of the dental school joined the campaign to introduce fluoridation to improve public dental health. Walsh and other staff spoke at public meetings on the issue, against "vociferous opposition". At one such meeting, in Port Chalmers in 1958, Walsh spoke alongside nutritionist Muriel Bell, and was opposed by Auckland mayor Dove-Meyer Robinson and Dr Elizabeth Mudie. An audience member was "so incensed that she hit Sir John over the head with her umbrella". Nevertheless fluoridation was introduced gradually around the country during the late 1950s and 1960s, and was eventually introduced in Dunedin in 1966. Dental health subsequently increased so that a school dental nurse was able to take care of 700 children rather than 450.

From 1956 to 1972 Walsh was chairman of the Dental Council of New Zealand and a consultant in dental health for the World Health Organization. He edited the New Zealand Dental Journal for seven years and was elected president of the Dental Association in 1969. In 1968 Walsh was elected to the Dunedin City Council. Walsh retired in 1971 due to ill health. He was active in Rotary, Alcoholics Anonymous, and the United Nations Association.

== High-speed dental drill ==
Before arriving at Otago, Walsh had obtained approval from the University of Melbourne for a Doctor of Dental Science thesis topic on aetiology of dental caries. However, his interest in the relationship between frequency of vibrations and dental pain that he had examined in Adelaide led him to collaborate with H. F. Symmons of the Physics Department at Otago and E. J. Stewart of the Dominion Physical Laboratories to investigate the topic. With his collaborators, Walsh published a series of three papers, covering the frequencies most associated with pain and vibration in teeth, the frequencies produced by an air-turbine drill compared to a dental handpiece, and the mechanical efficiency and heat produced by drills operating at 3,000 and 60,000 revolutions per minute (rpm). This research showed Walsh that increasing the speed of dental drills should reduce the pain associated with their use, and he submitted his research for his doctorate, which he gained in 1950. Walsh patented a 60,000 rpm contra-angle dental handpiece with a turbine fed by compressed air in November 1950. This made Walsh and his collaborators the inventors of "the first dental air turbine handpiece".

== Recognition ==
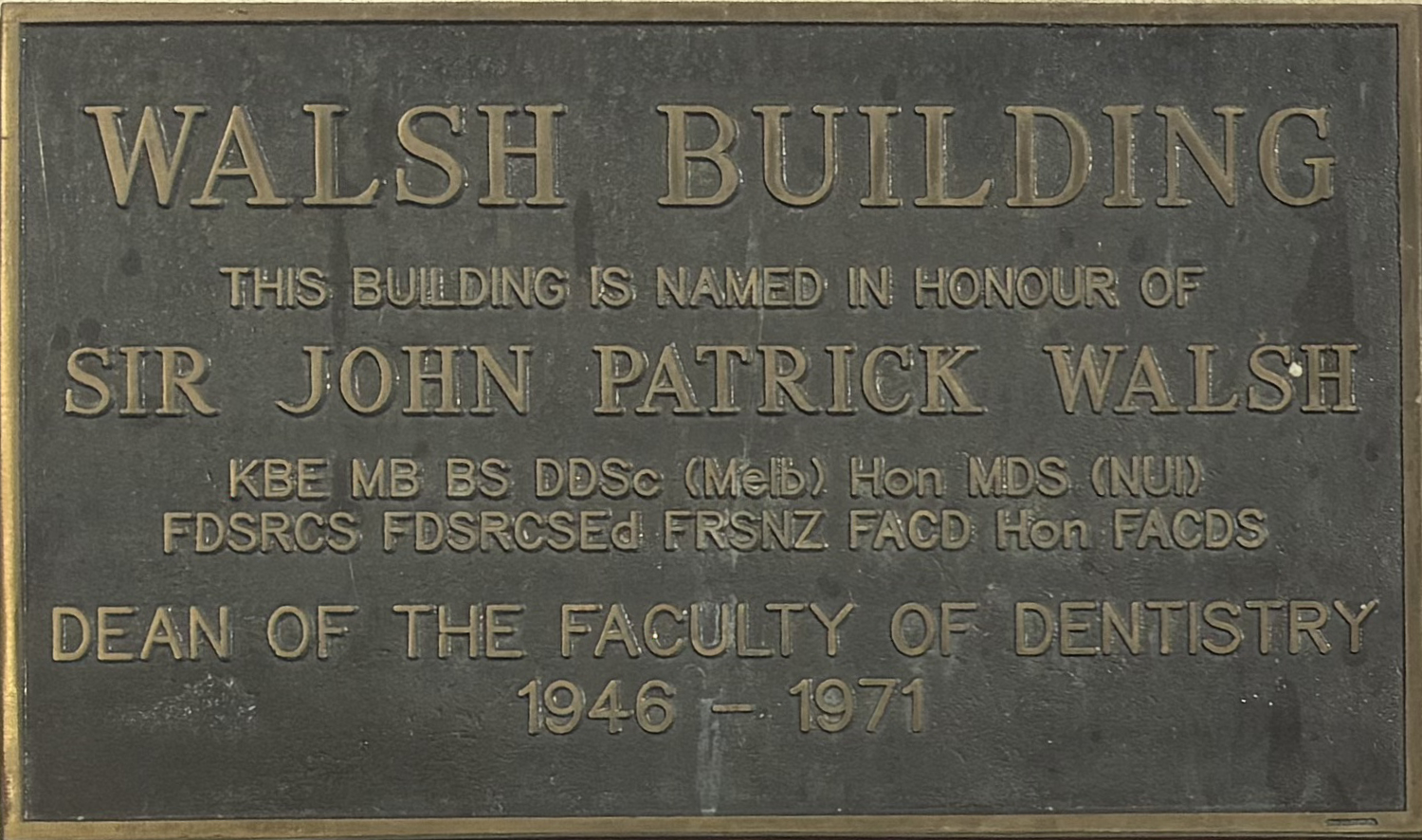
The plaque naming the 1961 dental school building in Walsh's honour

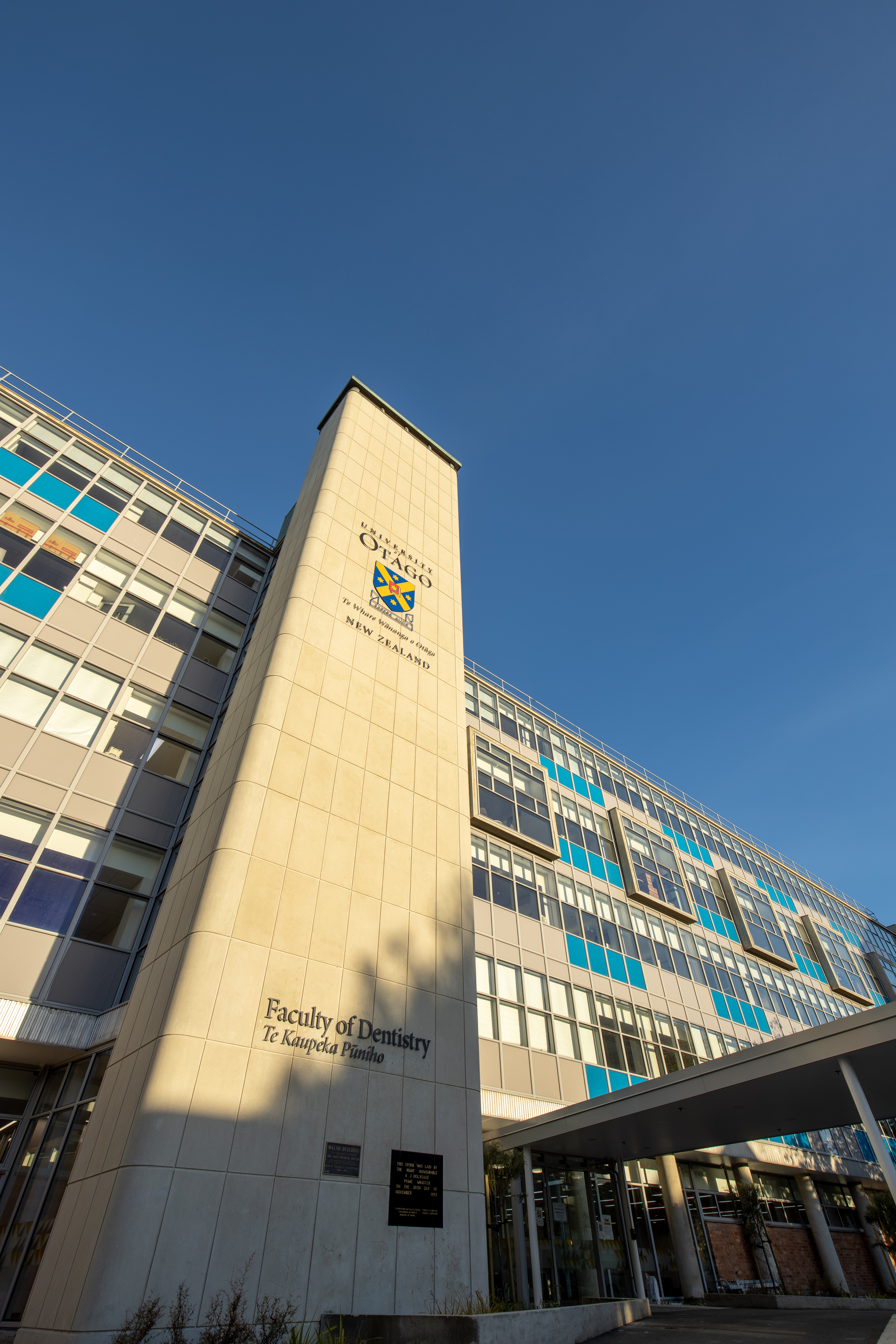
Walsh Building after its 2021 refurbishment

In the 1960 New Year Honours, Walsh was appointed a Knight Commander of the Order of the British Empire. In 1969 the International Dental Federation added Walsh to its list of honour. In 1971, the year he retired, he was awarded honorary life membership of the Dental Association. Other honours include:

- Queen Elizabeth II Coronation Medal (1953)
- Fellow of the Royal Society Te Apārangi (1961)
- Honorary Doctor of Science of the University of Otago (1975)
- Fellow of the Australian College of Dental Surgeons (1967), and Fellow in Dental Surgery of the Royal College of Surgeons of England

In 2001, the University of Otago named the dental school building the Walsh Building in his honour.

== Personal life ==
In 1934, Walsh married Enid Morris (1911–1993), while still studying for his first degree, and had to keep the marriage secret until his graduation in order not to lose his scholarship. The couple had four children, including Elizabeth Hanan.

In 1960, Walsh had a stroke, requiring extensive occupational therapy, which was followed by a dissecting aortic aneurysm in 1970. He died in Auckland in 2003, aged 92.

== Publications ==
Walsh wrote three books and published sixty-two scholarly articles. The New Zealand Dental Journal reprinted his most significant papers (listed below) in a 1972 issue devoted to Walsh.

=== Books ===
- A Manual of Stomatology (1957) Peryer, Christchurch
- Living with Uncertainty (1968), McIndoe, Dunedin
- Psychiatry and Dentistry (1976) Self-published, Dunedin

=== Selected scholarly articles ===
- Walsh, John Patrick (1946). "Principles and professional practice". New Zealand Dental Journal. 42: 142–143. ISSN 0028-8047. Wikidata Q136352763.
- Walsh, John Patrick (1941). "Maxillary nerve block anaesthesia". The Australian journal of dentistry. 45: 37–38. Wikidata Q136352771.
- Walsh, John Patrick; KI Donaldson; JF Harding (1955). "Surgical treatment of a case of mandibular prognathism". New Zealand Dental Journal. 51: 122–126. ISSN 0028-8047. Wikidata Q136352779.
- Walsh, John Patrick (1960). "Factors affecting dental education progress". Journal of Dental Education. 24: 139–145. ISSN 0022-0337. Wikidata Q136352987.
- Walsh, John Patrick (1966). "New trends in dental education". International Dental Journal. 16 (4): 480–489. PMID 5224755. Wikidata Q70895584.
- Walsh, John Patrick (1967). "Ends and means in dental education". Annals of the Australian College of Dental Surgeons: 28–36. PMID 5254621. Wikidata Q43897085.
- Walsh, John Patrick; H. F. Symmons (1948). "Vibration perception in teeth during cavity preparation". New Zealand Dental Journal. 44: 39–41. ISSN 0028-8047. Wikidata Q136353016.
- Walsh, John Patrick; H. F. Symmons (1949). "A comparison of the heat production and mechanical efficiency of diamond instruments, stones, and burs at 3000 and 60,000 rpm". New Zealand Dental Journal. 45: 28–32. ISSN 0028-8047. Wikidata Q136353030.
- Walsh, John Patrick; R W Green (1950). "The influence of some surface-active substances on decalcification of the enamel surface". Journal of Dental Research. 29 (3): 270–277. doi:10.1177/00220345500290030301. PMID 15428558. Wikidata Q80726667.
- M Irwin; A G Leaver; Walsh, John Patrick (1957). "Further studies on the influence of surface active agents on decalcification of the enamel surface". Journal of Dental Research. 36 (2): 166–172. doi:10.1177/00220345570360020201. PMID 13416446. Wikidata Q74456470.
- Walsh, John Patrick (1964). "Psychological defence mechanisms in dentistry". Australian Dental Journal. 9: 455–465. ISSN 0045-0421. Wikidata Q136353045.
- Walsh, John Patrick (1965). "The dental nurse". Journal of the American College of Dentists. 32: 62–69. PMID 14275099. Wikidata Q78290546.
