= Harry Wardell =

New Zealand pastoralist, businessman, and wool industry leader

Henry John Wardell CMG (1890–1972) was a notable New Zealand pastoralist, businessman and wool industry leader. He was born in Dunedin, New Zealand, in 1890.

In the 1960 New Year Honours, Wardell was appointed a Companion of the Order of St Michael and St George, in recognition of his service as chairman of the New Zealand Wool Board.
