= Elizabeth Hanan =

New Zealand local-body politician (1937–2024)

Dame Elizabeth Hanan DNZM CRSNZ
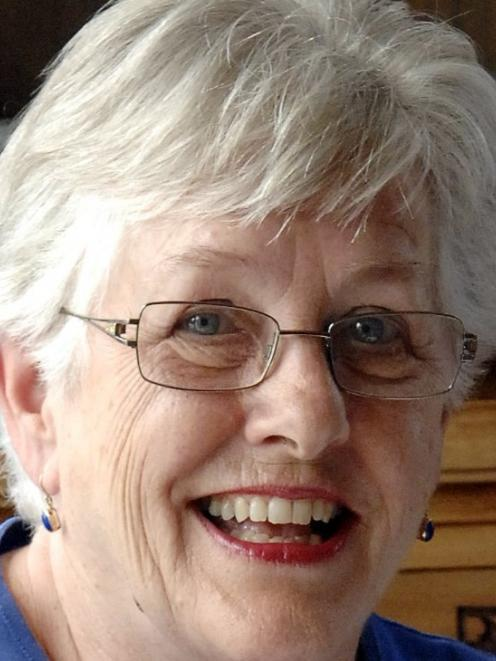
- Hanan in 2013

Deputy mayor of Dunedin
- In office 1998–2004

Personal details
- Born: Elizabeth Ann Walsh; 21 August 1937 Melbourne, Victoria, Australia
- Died: 13 October 2024 (aged 87) Dunedin, New Zealand
- Spouse: John Murray Hanan (m. 1966; died 2022)
- Children: 3
- Parent: John Walsh (father)
- Occupation: Science teacher; local politician

Dame Elizabeth Ann Hanan DNZM CRSNZ (née Walsh; 21 August 1937 – 13 October 2024) was a New Zealand local-body politician and community leader. She served as deputy mayor of Dunedin between 1998 and 2004.

== Early life and family ==
Hanan was born Elizabeth Ann Walsh on 21 August 1937 in Melbourne, Victoria, Australia, the daughter of John Patrick Walsh and Enid Walsh (née Morris). The family moved to New Zealand in 1946 when her father was appointed professor of dentistry at the University of Otago; he invented the high-speed dental drill and was later knighted for services to dentistry. Elizabeth Walsh was educated at Columba College and Otago Girls' High School, before going on to study at the University of Otago between 1955 and 1960, and Canterbury University College between 1960 and 1961, graduating with a Bachelor of Science degree.

In 1966, she married John Murray Hanan, and the couple went on to have three children.

== Teaching career ==
Hanan worked as a secondary school science teacher between 1960 and 1962, 1964 and 1966, and 1984 to 1988. She was also a laboratory supervisor and demonstrator at the University of Otago from 1975 to 1986, and a chemistry tutor at Otago Polytechnic between 1982 and 1985.

== Local politics and community involvement ==
Hanan was first elected to the Dunedin City Council in 1986, and served as deputy mayor of Dunedin, under Sukhi Turner, between 1998 and 2004. She served on many community organisations, including as a member and chair of the Otago Museum Trust, the Keep Dunedin Beautiful programme, and the Electrical Workers Registration Board. She has been a member of the Fortune Theatre trust board, the New Zealand Consumer Council and then the board of the Consumers Institute of New Zealand, and the national executive of the Plunket Society. Between 1990 and 1992, she was the president of the Otago branch of the New Zealand Federation of University Women.

In 1998, Hanan was intimately involved with the establishment of the New Zealand International Science Festival, and then in its continuation as a biennial event.

== Later life and death ==
Hanan died in Dunedin on 13 October 2024, at the age of 87. She had been predeceased by her husband, Murray Hanan, who died in March 2022.

== Honours and awards ==
In 1990, Hanan received the New Zealand 1990 Commemoration Medal, and in 1993 she was awarded the New Zealand Suffrage Centennial Medal. In the 1998 Queen's Birthday Honours, she was appointed a Dame Companion of the New Zealand Order of Merit, for services to the community. Hanan was made a Companion of the Royal Society of New Zealand in 2003, and in 2010 she received the first life membership awarded by the New Zealand International Science Festival.
