= James Manning (scientist) =

British chemist and surgeon

James Dermot Manning (10 September 1917 in Georgetown, British Guyana – 30 June 1989 in Wellington, New Zealand) was a surgeon, pathologist and public health administrator. He was a leading authority on the laboratory diagnosis of Toxoplasmosis.

== Education ==
Manning was educated at Clongowes Wood College near Clane in County Kildare in Ireland and studied medicine at St Bartholomew's Medical College and at the London School of Hygiene and Tropical Medicine. His qualifications were as follows – MRCS (Eng) LRCP (London) 1940, MB BS (London) 1946, MD (London) 1951, DipBact (London) 1951, MRCPath 1966 and FRCPath 1978. Manning initially worked at Dulwich Hospital in London.

== Military career ==
During the Second World War, Manning was Surgeon Lieutenant, RNVR 1940–1946, and was on destroyer duties from 1940 until 1942. He was based at Haslar Naval Hospital and St Vincents Fleet Air Arm Hospital at Portsmouth from 1942 until 1944. In the final year of the war, Manning was in charge of the laboratory on the hospital ship Ophir.

== Post-war career in London and Nigeria ==
Following the end of the war, Manning took the position of Pathology Registrar at Edgware General Hospital in London in 1946. In 1947, he went to Nigeria where through 1952, he was the Pathologist in the Nigerian Medical Services at Lagos General Hospital, at the Kano General Hospital and later at the Medical Research Institute in Yaba.

== Career in New Zealand ==
Manning arrived in Wellington in 1953 to take up the position of Assistant Director (Microbiology) at the National Health Institute. He became Director of the Institute upon the sudden death of Dr James Blakelock in August 1955 and held this position until 1970. Manning started the New Zealand Reference Culture Collection (NZRCC) at the Institute in 1955. This involved establishing and running both the general and reference laboratories for bacteriology and virology with a special interest in antibiotic sensitivity methods and a haemagglutination test for toxoplasmosis. The collection was later designated as the national repository of organisms of national interest. The bacteriologist Sydney Josland worked under the direction of Manning at the Institute. Manning undertook a World Health Organisation Fellowship in 1966 and studied advances in laboratory organisation and methods. Between 1970 and 1982, he was the Consultant Medical Microbiologist at Wellington Hospital. In 1980, he became the first chairman of the Management Committee of the Department of Laboratory Services. Manning was Clinical Lecturer at the Wellington School of Medicine in 1978 and became Clinical Reader in 1982.

Manning was "a shrewd and exceptional clinician – highly skilled at the laboratory bench – an excellent committee man – (with) diplomacy and breadth of experience".

== Personal life ==
Manning married Grace O'Brien in 1943 and they had one daughter and four sons, one of whom is the British New Zealand atmospheric scientist, Martin Manning.

== Sources ==
- Stewart, DT (1994). Pathology in Wellington. Public and National Health, Hospital, Academic & Private, 1891–1994. Christchurch.
- Traue, JE, ed. (1978). Who's Who in New Zealand. Wellington, N.Z: AH & AW Reed Ltd.
