= John Ranstead =

New Zealand farmer, animal breeder, agricultural scientist

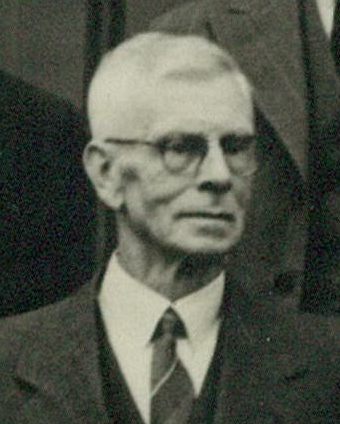
Ranstead in 1948

John Morris Ranstead OBE (1 July 1884 – 7 September 1972) was a New Zealand farmer, animal breeder and agricultural scientist. He was born in East Ham, Essex, England, in 1884.

In 1931, Ranstead was the second recipient of the Bledisloe Medal awarded by the Canterbury Agricultural College. In the 1960 New Year Honours, Ranstead was appointed an Officer of the Order of the British Empire for services to the farming industry. Ranstead was the first president of the New Zealand Society of Animal Production.
