= 1960 New Year Honours (New Zealand) =

Annual awards for New Zealanders

The 1960 New Year Honours in New Zealand were appointments by Elizabeth II on the advice of the New Zealand government to various orders and honours to reward and highlight good works by New Zealanders. The awards celebrated the passing of 1959 and the beginning of 1960, and were announced on 1 January 1960.

The recipients of honours are displayed here as they were styled before their new honour.

== Knight Bachelor ==
- George Alexander Currie – vice-chancellor of the University of New Zealand.

== Order of Saint Michael and Saint George ==
=== Companion (CMG) ===
- John Cairney MD FRACS – Director-General of Health and Inspector-General of Hospitals.
- Henry John Wardell – chairman of the New Zealand Wool Board.
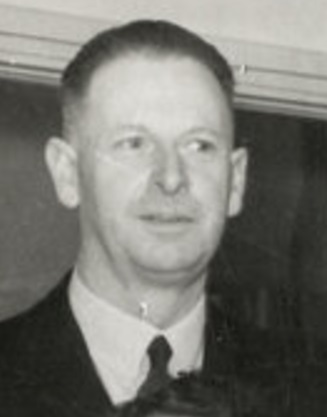
John Cairney

== Order of the British Empire ==
=== Knight Commander (KBE) ===
Civil division

- Professor John Patrick Walsh MB BS – dean of the University of Otago Dental School.

Military division

- Major-General Cyril Ettrick Weir CB CBE DSO – Generals' List (Regular Force), New Zealand Army.
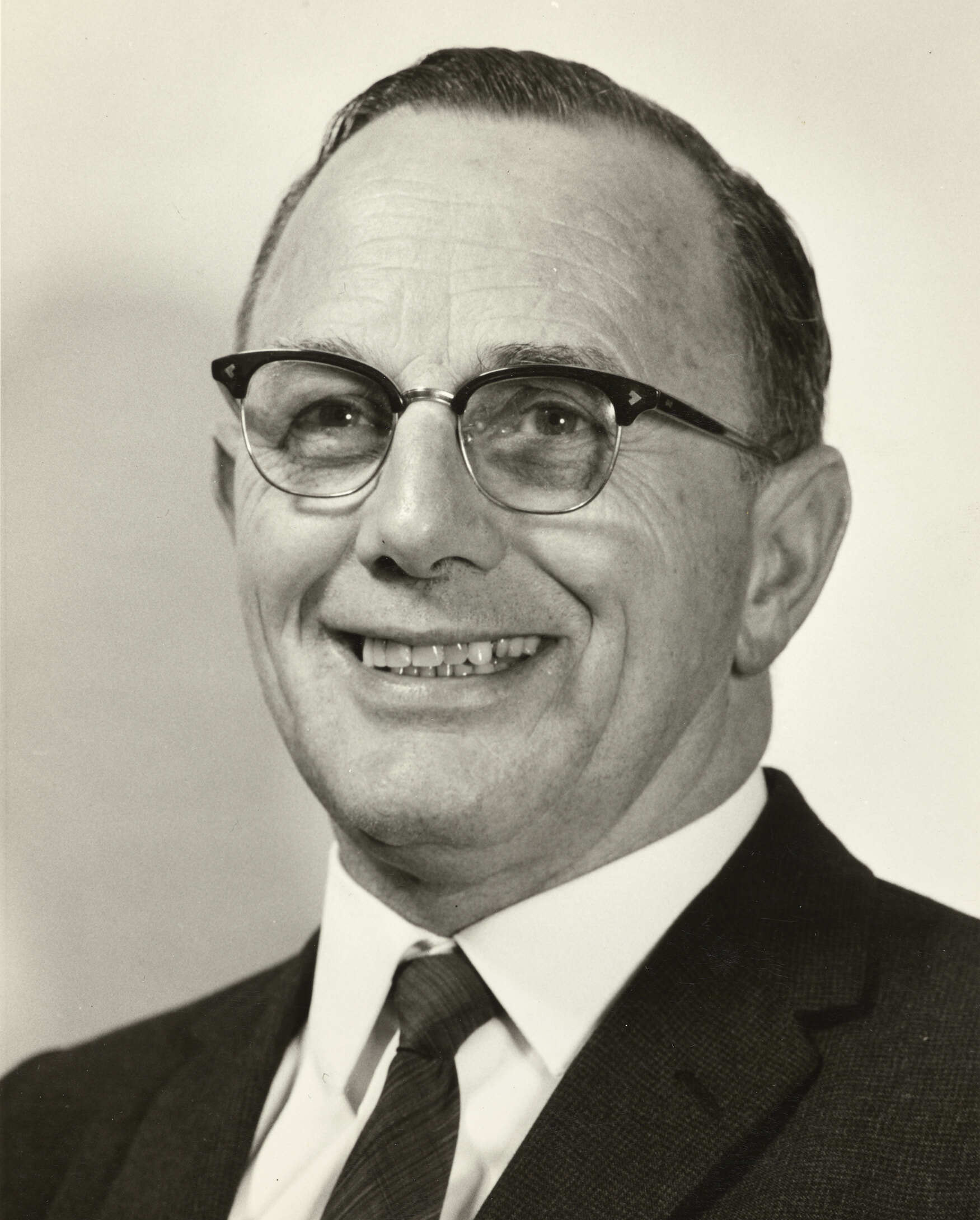
Sir John Walsh

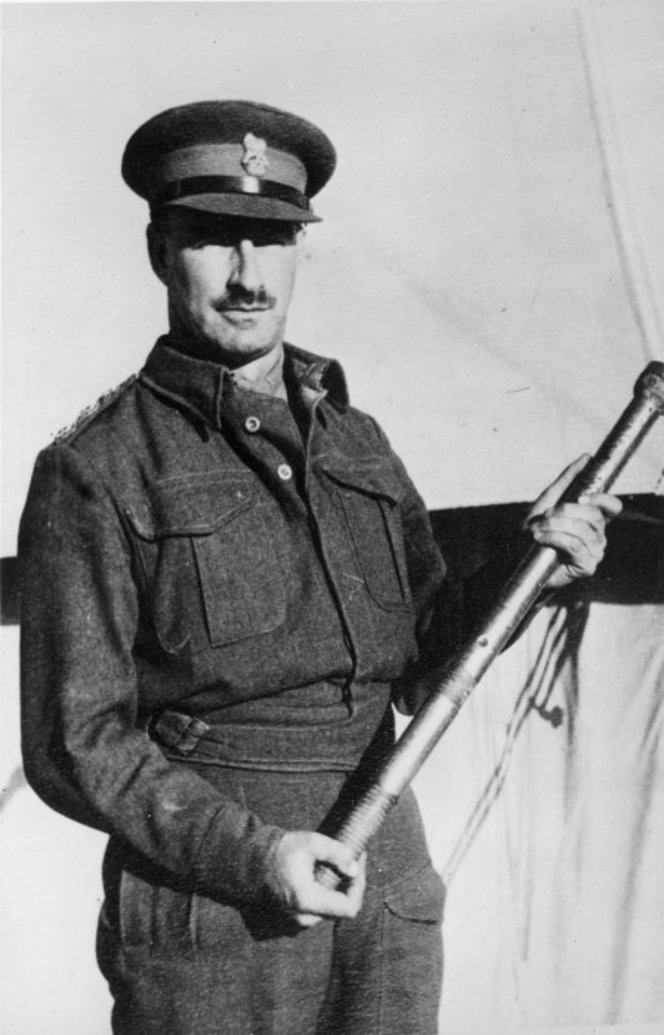
Sir Stephen Weir

=== Commander (CBE) ===
Civil division

- Archibald Hugh Bogle – a member of the Survey Board for many years.
- Gerald William Lane – of Dunedin. For services to the manufacturing industry.
- Charles Archibald McFarlane – director-general, Post and Telegraph Department.
- John Hugh Phillipps OBE JP – president of the management committee, Wellington Cricket Association.

Military division

- Brigadier Arthur Beecher Bullen DSO ED – Royal New Zealand Infantry Corps (Territorial Force).
- Air Commodore Cameron Archer Turner OBE – Royal New Zealand Air Force.
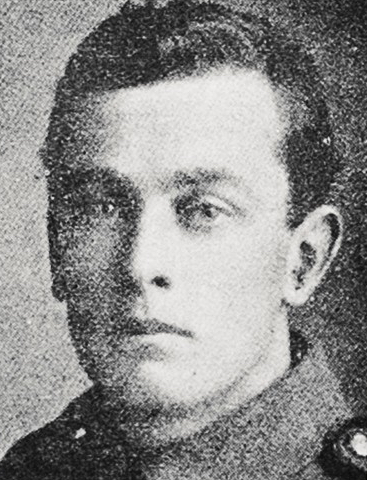
Jack Phillipps

=== Officer (OBE) ===
Civil division

- James Walter Armstrong – principal, Dunedin Teachers' Training College.
- Henry Oscar Askew – assistant director, Cawthron Institute, Nelson.
- Harry Ernest Brusey – of Wellington. For services to music.
- William John Cartwright – of Christchurch. For services to education.
- Charles Gilmour Stead Ellis – formerly Assistant Director of Education.
- Edward Grace Guy – of Rotorua. For services to journalism.
- Desmond James Hewitt – lecturer and examiner in law at Canterbury University College.
- Frederick Henry McDowall – chief chemist, Dairy Research Institute, Massey Agricultural College, Palmerston North.
- John Morris Ranstead – of Waikato. For services to the farming industry.
- Hugh Ritchie JP – of Invercargill. For services to the community.
- Hokio Tarawhiti – of Huntly. For services to the Māori community.

Military division

- Lieutenant-Colonel David John Aitken – New Zealand Regiment (Regular Force).
- Lieutenant-Colonel (temporary) Richard Mitchell Scott Orbell – Royal New Zealand Infantry Corps (Territorial Force).
- Wing Commander Henry Christian Salmon – Royal New Zealand Air Force.
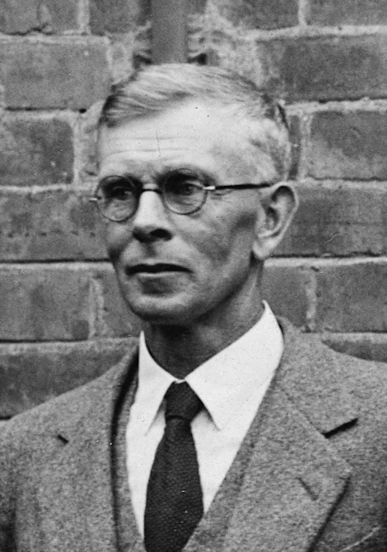
John Ranstead

=== Member (MBE) ===
Civil division

- The Reverend Leo Vincent Downey – director of the Catholic social services in Auckland City.
- William John Elvy – of Blenheim. For services to the community in local-body affairs.
- Ernest Hector Ferguson – of Wellington. For patriotic services.
- James Robertson Hair – of Gisborne. For services to the community in local-body affairs.
- David Walter Reginald Heatley – resident commissioner, Niue Island.
- Leslie Alfred Higgins JP – of Nelson. For services to the community in local-body administration.
- Edgar John Gordon Hotham. For services in the New Zealand Police.
- Claud William Barkley Huxford JP – of Wellington. For services to the community, especially in the field of education.
- Catherine Agnes McGuire – of Timaru. For services to the community, especially in connection with the South Canterbury Children's Health Camp organisations.
- John Thomas Leslie McPhee – of Runanga. For services to the community, especially as organiser for the Grey District Blood Donors' Association.
- John Dawson Mahaffie – brigadier, Salvation Army (retired).
- Keith Mills – of Auckland. For services to the community, especially in connection with Returned and Home-servicemen's Associations.
- Ruia Mereana Morrison – of Rotorua. For services in the field of sport, especially tennis.
- Rangi Kapo Ratahi – a leader of the Māori people in Taranaki.
- Alice Roberts JP – of Napier. For social welfare services.
- Isabella Enid Roberts – of Levin. For services to the community.
- George Walter Simon JP – secretary, Otago Tribal Executive, and honorary Māori welfare officer.
- Cyril John Benedict Williams JP – of Auckland. For services to the community in the field of sport.

Military division

- Lieutenant-Commander (SD) Edward Herbert Biggs – Royal New Zealand Navy.
- Major Robert Noel Barton ED – Royal New Zealand Infantry Corps (Territorial Force).
- Warrant Officer First Class John Cameron – New Zealand Regiment (Regular Force).
- Major Louie Margaret Knights – New Zealand Women's Royal Army Corps (Regular Force).
- Major (temporary) Grenville Herbert Rush – Royal New Zealand Provost Corps (Territorial Force).
- Flight Lieutenant Robert Fraser Ward – Royal New Zealand Air Force.
- Warrant Officer Edward Sheppard – Royal New Zealand Air Force.

== British Empire Medal (BEM) ==
Civil division

- Alfred Eric Bishoprick MM – lately overseer, Akatarawa, Kaitoke and Rimutaka highways.
- Arthur Burgess – chief prison officer (first class), Mount Eden Prison, Auckland.
- George Dynes – constable, New Zealand Police Force.
- Ewan Gilbert Andrews Rippin – detective senior sergeant, New Zealand Police Force.

Military division

- Chief Petty Officer John Butler Allan – Royal New Zealand Naval Volunteer Reserve.
- Chief Wren Lorna Evelyn Coles – Women's Royal New Zealand Naval Service.
- Chief Joiner Anthony Martin Hobbs – Royal New Zealand Navy.
- Chief Engineering Mechanic Peter Frederick Willis Moss – Royal New Zealand Navy.
- Corporal (temporary) David Elwin Dallow – Royal New Zealand Infantry Corps (Territorial Force).
- Warrant Officer Second Class (temporary) Thomas Dobson – Corps of Royal New Zealand Engineers (Regular Force).
- Sergeant Lawrence Albert Earle Jacobs – Royal New Zealand Army Service Corps (Regular Force).
- Bombardier (temporary) Bruce Mansell – Royal Regiment of New Zealand Artillery (Territorial Force).
- Flight Sergeant Norman John Cooper – Royal New Zealand Air Force.
- Sergeant Alison Jean Simpson – Women's Royal New Zealand Air Force.

== Royal Red Cross ==
=== Associate (ARRC) ===
- Matron Elsie Margaret Webb – Royal New Zealand Nursing Corps (Regular Force).
- Charge Sister Rona Irene Rich – Royal New Zealand Nursing Corps (Regular Force).

== Air Force Cross (AFC) ==
- Squadron Leader Owen David Staple DFC – Royal New Zealand Air Force.
- Flight Lieutenant Patrick Neville – Royal New Zealand Air Force.

== Queen's Commendation for Valuable Service in the Air ==
- Flight Lieutenant John Alexander Laing – Royal New Zealand Air Force.
