= Sydney Josland =

New Zealand bacteriologist (1904–1991)

Sydney Walter Josland (30 January 1904 – 28 June 1991) was a New Zealand bacteriologist who specialised in research into Leptospirosis, Salmonella and the control of diseases in animals.

== Early life and education ==
Born in Christchurch in 1904, Josland was the eldest son of Frederick Josland and Mary Amelia Kerr. He attended West Christchurch District High School. An uncle, Robert Kerr, had made a fortune in South Africa after the Boer War and had retired to Geneva in Switzerland where he invested money into Dr Henri Spahlinger's work on a vaccine for Tuberculosis. Kerr had wanted Josland to study law and had offered to finance his studies. The offer never came through, however, as Kerr died of malarial fever in Geneva on 7 April 1923, aged 46. Perhaps influenced by his uncle's early death, Josland commenced studying towards a medical degree at the University of Otago in Dunedin. He did not finish the degree, due to financial constraints, but gained a Certificate of Proficiency in bacteriology and clinical pathology from the university in 1926. Josland married Elsie Naviro Railton at a wedding officiated by the Reverend Alfred Button at St. Peters Church in Dunedin on 20 December 1927 and they had a son. Josland completed a Bachelor of Music degree from the University of Otago in 1935 and a Bachelor of Arts degree from Victoria University of Wellington in 1950.

== Early scientific career ==
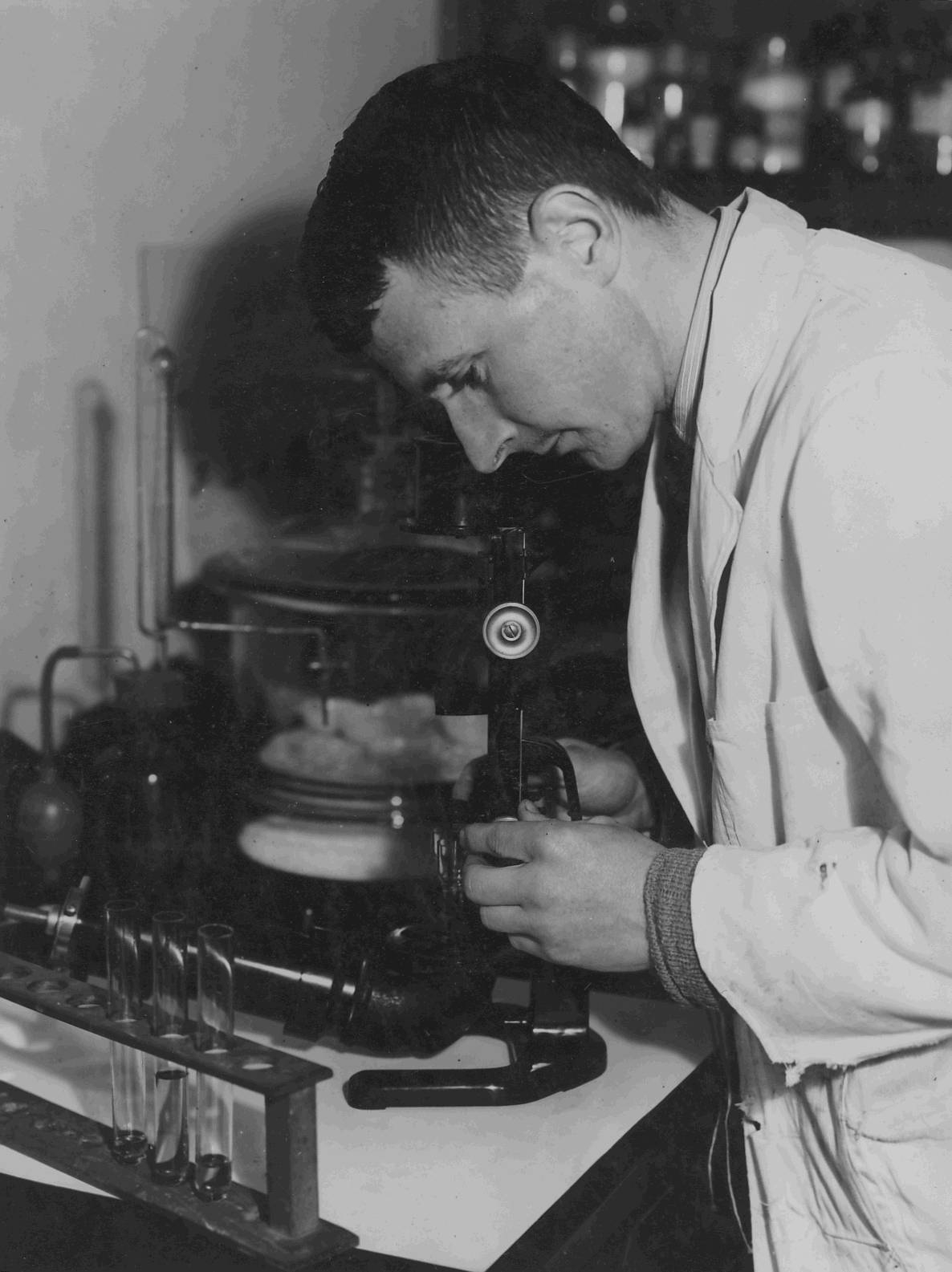
Sydney Josland working at the Wallaceville Animal Research Centre in 1934.

Josland was initially a cadet in the Agricultural Department in Christchurch during which time he attended classes at Canterbury College. In 1921, he was appointed Assistant in the Bacteriological Department of Southland Hospital in Invercargill, where he was employed for eighteen months. Josland then became a Bacteriological Cadet attached to the Departments of Bacteriology and Pathology at the University of Otago Medical School where he worked under the supervision of Professors Eric D'Ath (pathology), Alexander Murray Drennan (pathology) and Charles Hercus (bacteriology). During his time at the Medical School, among other things, Josland worked on the chemical methods of pollen extraction and the preparation of these extracts for the diagnosis and therapy of hay fever. He also received training in recently developed methods of blood analysis from Dr Cedric Stanton Hicks. Additionally, Josland spent a brief period employed as relieving bacteriologist at the District Hospital in Whangārei.

Accompanied by his family, Josland arrived in Upper Hutt near Wellington in 1929, at the invitation of Dr Cyril Hopkirk, to set up a biochemistry laboratory at the Wallaceville Animal Research Centre. He later became Chief Bacteriologist at the Centre, where, in addition to working under Dr Hopkirk, he worked under Dr Ira Cunningham and Dr John Francis Filmer. Josland initiated the Technicians' Training Scheme at the Centre and supervised the training of technical staff.

Until 1930, no organised biochemical work had been undertaken in New Zealand on the blood and urine of normal cattle and sheep. Josland decided that his first priority should be an attempt to determine the normal values and limits for the purpose of standards. This was done and became the standards upon which future biochemical investigations were based. Josland directed biochemical work towards various cattle and sheep diseases, including eclampsia, temporary sterility in cattle and pulpy kidney in lambs, blood from the latter showing no deviation from the normal.

Josland undertook post-graduate training under the direction of Hedley Marston at the Animal Nutrition Laboratory of the Commonwealth Department of Scientific and Industrial Research in Adelaide, Australia in 1935. Dr Lionel Bull was head of the Laboratory and staff conducted research into animal nutrition problems. At the time, studies were being made of coast disease, which affected sheep, and metabolism in ewes. One of the problems of drought-feeding was to find the minimum energy requirements of the animal. Josland's main purpose in going to the Laboratory was to get some application in biochemistry in the investigation of diseases in animals. He also studied cobalt deficiency. Upon his return to New Zealand, Josland commented that "[t]here seemed to be no dearth of money in Australia for research work [and] an amazing amount of money was made available from sources outside the Government, particularly the pastoral trusts and the banks".

Investigations carried out by workers both in Australia and New Zealand over a three-year period leading up to 1938 had demonstrated the profound importance to the health of livestock of a minute quantity of cobalt in the diet. Coast disease and enzootic marasmus in Australia, and bush sickness, Morton Mains disease and Mairoa disease in New Zealand, were associated with cobalt deficiency in pastures and were curable, partially and entirely, when cobalt was supplied. In addition to field experiments, Dr Cunningham undertook experimental work with rats in an attempt to gain knowledge of the function of cobalt in the animal system, and Josland investigated the blood-changes induced by cobalt deficiency. This work was done at the Wallaceville Animal Research Centre.

Working under Dr Filmer, Josland, together with six veterinary officers, two chemists and two staff from the Department of Scientific and Industrial Research, investigated the facial eczema epidemic affecting stock in the Waikato District in 1938. The investigation embraced three fields, namely animal tissues, pastures, and soils. The work on animal tissues, such as the chemical changes in blood, bile and liver, or the presence of unusual metabolic substances, was undertaken by Josland in collaboration with Dr Filmer, and they had the resources of the chemistry section of the Department of Agriculture at their disposal.

== Interest in music ==
Josland was a member of the Royal Dunedin Male Choir under Victor Galway and upon moving to Upper Hutt became a music pupil of Claude Haydon and Charles Martin. He passed in Instrumentation and Form in Music in an examination of the University of New Zealand in 1932. In 1933, Josland became the conductor of a newly formed choir called The Upper Hutt Home and School Association Male Voice Choir which in 1937 became The Upper Hutt Male Choir. While in Adelaide in 1935, Josland joined the St Peter's Cathedral, Adelaide Choir and was an organ pupil of John Millard Dunn.

In 1935, Josland completed the degree of Bachelor of Music, his musical setting of Byron's "Ode to Adversity" having been approved by the examiner, Sir Percy Buck of the University of London.

== Military career ==
Josland began his military career in the Cadet Service with the West Christchurch District High School and the Canterbury and Southland Regiments between 1917 and 1921. He was then in the ranks of the territorial service during 1922 and 1923 before being commissioned into the Otago Regiment in 1923. Before the Second World War, Josland was a captain in the Twenty-fifth (Wellington) Battalion of the New Zealand Territorial Force. He went to the War as Second-in-Command of D Company in the 25th Battalion (New Zealand) (Third Echelon) of the Second New Zealand Expeditionary Force. On 21 February 1941, Josland was seconded for duty as Liaison Officer, 6th Infantry Brigade (New Zealand). He relinquished this position and ceased to be seconded on 4 June 1941. On 20 September 1941, Josland was appointed to command the New Zealand Graves Registration and Enquiries Unit. From 21 April 1942, he was Staff Captain to Brigadier General Sir Herbert Hart (general), who was the Assistant Director of the Graves Registration Unit, General Headquarters, Middle East and Chief Administrative Officer for the Imperial War Graves Commission, Eastern District. Josland was later seconded to Persia and Iraq Command and the Graves Registration and Enquiries Unit, Mediterranean Pool where he served in the British Army and then in the Second Indian Division of the Indian Army in Iran and Iraq. On 5 July 1945, Josland was appointed temporary lieutenant colonel while employed with the British Forces. He served in Greece, Italy, the Middle East and North Africa. Josland was fluent in Arabic and French and qualified in Urdu. When the War was over, he returned to New Zealand with the rank of lieutenant colonel and was posted to the Retired List on 31 July 1946. Josland was presented with the Efficiency Decoration (New Zealand) by the Governor-General of New Zealand, on 31 August 1950, for his services to the New Zealand Army. A collection of poems by Josland, reflecting on his experiences and impressions of the Middle East, and later Italy, during the period from 1941 to 1945, was published in 2005.

== Post-war scientific career ==
Josland returned to the Wallaceville Animal Research Centre in 1946. The use of precise serological methods of antigenic analysis had made possible the identification of organisms of the Salmonella group which had been isolated from material of animal origin at Wallaceville. He was able to isolate only the two organisms - Salmonella Typhi Murium and Salmonella Cholera Suis. This contrasted with overseas results where many types of Salmonella had been found. In the 1950s, Josland prepared killed vaccines from Salmonella Typhi Murium and Salmonella Cholera Suis for use in pigs and sheep, respectively, but trial results were not encouraging.

Josland was the first to investigate the use of a vaccine to control Salmonellosis in sheep. He discovered an injection of formalised alum-precipitated Salmonella Typhi Murium vaccine resulted in low and inconsistent antibody response. Even though a greater number of vaccinated animals survived following challenge, compared to unvaccinated animals, he concluded that prophylactic vaccination was of little use. He was able to recommend control measures but stressed that early diagnosis by the clinician, confirmed by laboratory analysis, was important if hygiene and isolation measures were to be successful.

Further investigations carried out by Josland lead to the isolation, in New Zealand, of the Salmonella organism from all species of farm animals, from watering holes, and from pastures contaminated by infected faeces of such animals, and he showed, in a series of comprehensive field studies, that the organism when deposited in dung, water or pasture, could remain viable for periods ranging up to twenty-eight weeks. Josland also found that the survival of Salmonella was less on pasture exposed to sun compared to shaded pasture.

In 1954, Josland resigned from the Wallaceville Animal Research Centre to become Chief Bacteriologist at the National Health Institute, Department of Health, in Wellington. The Institute carried out research and teaching, and provided specialised epidemiological and laboratory services in general bacteriology, bacteriophage typing, chemistry and virology. Josland continued to specialize in research into Leptospirosis and Salmonella, working firstly under Dr James Blakelock, and later under Dr James Manning (scientist).

He returned briefly to the Wallaceville Animal Research Centre in 1960 as officer in charge of the Small Animal Unit.

Josland became an associate of the New Zealand Institute of Chemistry in 1933 and later an honorary life member of the New Zealand Association of Bacteriologists. From 1961 until his retirement in 1972, he taught science at Heretaunga College in Upper Hutt. He died in Lower Hutt in 1991.

Josland made considerable contributions to the knowledge of Leptospirosis and Salmonella and the control of diseases in animals in the fields of bacteriology, biochemistry and haematology. He published thirty articles related to his research in Australasian medical and scientific journals.

== Published articles ==
- Josland, S. W., The Experimental Transmission of Salmonella Cholerae Suis Infection in Swine. New Zealand Department of Agriculture, Wellington, New Zealand.
- Josland, S. W., Salmonellosis of Pigs. New Zealand Department of Agriculture, Wellington, New Zealand.
- Josland, S. W., A Study of the Blood of Healthy Sheep and Cattle in New Zealand. New Zealand Journal of Science and Technology, Vol. XIV, No. 5, April 1933, pp. 298–308.
- Josland, S. W., The Effect of Pregnancy and Parturition on Some Blood and Urinary Constituents in the Ewe. New Zealand Journal of Science and Technology, March 1934, pp. 359–363.
- Cunningham, I. J. and Josland, S. W., The Determination of Magnesium in Blood Serum. New Zealand Journal of Science and Technology, Vol. XVI, No. 1, July 1934, pp. 28–29.
- Josland, S. W. and Lugg, J. W. H., A Note on the Colorimetric Estimation of Cobalt in Solution by Means of Nitroso-R-Salt. Australian Journal of Experimental Biology and Medical Science, Vol. XIV, 27 July 1936.
- Josland, S. W., The Effect of Feeding Cobalt to Rats. New Zealand Journal of Science and Technology, Vol. 18, October 1936, pp. 474–480.
- Josland, S. W., Total Ash of Sheeps' Bones as an Index to Calcification. New Zealand Journal of Science and Technology, Vol. 18, January 1937, pp. 665–668.
- Josland, S. W., The Effect of Feeding Excess of Cobalt to Healthy Sheep. New Zealand Journal of Science and Technology, Vol. 19, June 1937, pp. 31–37.
- Askew, H. O. and Josland, S. W., The Rate of Excretion of Cobalt by Sheep After Drenching with Cobalt Chloride. New Zealand Journal of Science and Technology, Vol. 18, May 1937, pp. 888–892.
- Josland, S. W. and McNaught, K. J., Further Observations on the Production of Cobalt Polycythaemia in Rats. New Zealand Journal of Science and Technology, Vol. 19, February 1938, pp. 536–540.
- Josland, S. W., Salmonellosis of Swine in New Zealand. Australian Veterinary Journal, Vol. 23, October 1947, pp. 292–293.
- Josland, S. W., The Identification of Salmonella with Special Reference to Serological Methods. Journal of the New Zealand Association of Bacteriologists, Vol. 3, No. 4, October 1948, pp. 51–54.
- Josland, S. W., A Note on the Use of Hydroquinone Enrichment Media for the Isolation of Salmonella. Journal of the New Zealand Association of Bacteriologists, Vol. 4, No. 1, 1949, pp. 5–6.
- Josland, S. W., The Identification of S. Bovis Morbificans Infection in New Zealand. Journal of the New Zealand Association of Bacteriologists, Vol. 4, No. 3, July 1949, pp. 34–35.
- Josland, S. W., Salmonella Infections of Animals in New Zealand. Australian Veterinary Journal, Vol. 26, No. 9, September 1950, pp. 249–253.
- Josland, S. W., Survival of Salmonella Typhi Murium on Various Substances Under Natural Conditions. Australian Veterinary Journal, Vol. 27, No. 10, October 1951, pp. 264–266.
- Josland, S. W., A Further Note on the Serological Identification of Salmonella Cultures. Journal of the New Zealand Association of Bacteriologists, Vol. 7, No. 2, July 1952, pp. 31–34.
- Josland, S. W., Salmonella Types in New Zealand. New Zealand Medical Journal, Vol. 51, No. 283, June 1952, pp. 180–184.
- Josland, S. W., The Identification of Salmonella Saint Paul in New Zealand. Journal of the New Zealand Association of Bacteriologists, Vol. 8, No. 109, 1953, pp. 3–5.
- Josland, S. W., The Identification of Salmonella Senftenberg in New Zealand. Journal of the New Zealand Association of Bacteriologists, Vol. 8, No. 2, April 1953, pp. 22–24.
- Josland, S. W., Observations on the Aetiology of Bovine and Ovine Salmonellosis in New Zealand. New Zealand Veterinary Journal, Vol. 1, December 1953, pp. 131–136.
- Josland, S. W., Additional Salmonella Types in New Zealand. New Zealand Medical Journal, Vol. 53, No. 297, October 1954, pp. 486–488.
- Josland, S. W., The Immunogenic Properties of Salmonella Typhi Murium in Sheep. New Zealand Veterinary Journal, Vol. 2, March 1954, pp. 2–7.
- Josland, S. W., The Infective and Immunogenic Properties of Salmonella Cholerae Suis in Weaner Pigs. New Zealand Veterinary Journal, Vol. 2, June 1954, pp. 41–46.
- Josland, S. W., Observations on the Nutritional Requirements of Leptospirae and the Maintenance of Leptospiral Cultures. Journal of the New Zealand Association of Bacteriologists, Vol. 10, No. 3, October 1955, pp. 47–49.
- Josland, S. W., Additional Salmonella Types in New Zealand. III. New Zealand Medical Journal, Vol. 55, No. 306, April 1956, pp. 139–140.
- Allen, R. E., Cashmore, S., Josland, S. W. and Scott, H. M., Survey Work on Human Leptospirosis in New Zealand. New Zealand Medical Journal, Vol. 56, No. 312, April 1957, pp. 128–131.
- Josland, S. W., Additional Salmonella Types in New Zealand. IV. New Zealand Medical Journal, Vol. 57, No. 318, April 1958, pp. 155–156.
- Josland, S. W. and Norris, D. M., Additional Salmonella Types in New Zealand. V. New Zealand Medical Journal, Vol. 58, August 1959, pp. 504–506.

== Additional articles ==
- Josland, S. W., Infection with Salmonella Bovis Morbificans. Animal Health Notes, Vol. IX, No. 8, 19 August 1948, p. 134. Information Circular, Animal Research Centre, Wallaceville.
- Josland, S. W., Salmonellosis of Cattle. Animal Health Notes, Vol. X, No. 9, 20 September 1948, pp. 157–159. Information Circular, Animal Research Centre, Wallaceville.

== Sources ==
- "Army Appointments and Promotions". The Press. Vol. LXXXI, no. 24611. 6 July 1945. p. 6.
- "Army Staff Changes". The Evening Post. Vol. CXXXII, no. 113. 8 November 1941. p. 6.
- Buddle, M. B. (20 January 1961). "Letter dated 20 January 1961" (Document). Alexander Turnbull Library, Wellington, New Zealand: Sydney Walter Josland Papers. MS-Group-2144.
- Clark, R. G.; Robinson, R. A.; Alley, M. R.; Nicol, C. M.; Hathaway, S. C.; Marchant, R. M. (June 2002). "Salmonella in Animals in New Zealand: The Past to the Future". New Zealand Veterinary Journal. 50 (3, Supplement): 57–60. doi:10.1080/00480169.2002.36269. PMID 16032239.
- D'Ath, E. F. (2 August 1929). "Letter dated 2 August 1929" (Document). Alexander Turnbull Library, Wellington, New Zealand: Sydney Walter Josland Papers. MS-Group-2144.
- "Appendix to the Journals of the House of Representatives Session I-II, H-29". Department of Agriculture, Annual Report for 1930-31 (Report). 1931.
- "Appendix to the Journals of the House of Representatives Session I, H-29". Department of Agriculture, Annual Report for 1935-36 (Report). 1936.
- "Disease in Stock. Eczema Epidemic. Waikato Investigation". The Auckland Star. Vol. LXIX, no. 110. 12 May 1938. p. 12.
- "Eczema Scourge". Otago Daily Times. No. 23533. 23 June 1938. p. 7.
- Hall, J. W. (20 August 1927). "Letter dated 20 August 1927" (Document). Alexander Turnbull Library, Wellington, New Zealand: Sydney Walter Josland Papers. MS-Group-2144.
- Hart, Brigadier Sir H. "Diary" (Document). Alexander Turnbull Library, Wellington, New Zealand. MS-Papers-5097-02.
- "Health of Live-Stock". The Waikato Independent. Vol. XXXVIII, no. 3424. Cambridge. 3 March 1938. p. 3.
- Hercus, C. E. (13 November 1929). "Letter dated 13 November 1929" (Document). Alexander Turnbull Library, Wellington, New Zealand: Sydney Walter Josland Papers. MS-Group-2144.
- Hickey, F. (August 1952). "Salmonella Infection in New Zealand. A Public Health Hazard. Investigations at Wallaceville". New Zealand Agriculturist. VII (9): 3–4.
- Jensen, H., Directory of New Zealand Science. The New Zealand Association of Scientific Workers, Wellington, New Zealand, 1962.
- Josland, S. W. (17 July 1981). "Letter dated 17 July 1981" (Document). Alexander Turnbull Library, Wellington, New Zealand: Sydney Walter Josland Papers. MS-Group-2144.
- Josland, Sydney Walter (2005). Poems, 1941-1945. Auckland, New Zealand: Puriri Press. ISBN 0-908943-29-6.
- Josland, S.W.; Schramm, W.E. von (1941–43) War Diary, N.Z. Graves Registration and Enquiry Unit, Official Orders and Reports 1941–42[43], MS-2008-42-10-2-12, Auckland War Memorial Museum Archives.
- Kerslake, J. I. (February 2003). Salmonella Brandenburg in New Zealand Sheep: The Development of a Serological Diagnostic Test and a Case Control Study. A Thesis Presented in Partial Fulfilment of the Requirements for the Degree of Master of Veterinary Studies at Massey University (Master of Veterinary Studies thesis). Palmerston North, New Zealand: Massey University.
- "Local and general". The Evening Post. Vol. CIV, no. 114. 10 November 1922. p. 6.
- McLintock, A. H. (1966). "Laboratory Services". An Encyclopaedia of New Zealand. Wellington: R. E. Owen, Government Printer.
- "Marriages". Otago Daily Times. Vol. 20300. 7 January 1928. p. 10.
- Murray, C. J. (2000). "Environmental Aspects of Salmonella". In Wray, A; Wray, C. (eds.). Salmonella in Domestic Animals. Wallingford, United Kingdom: CAB International. ISBN 0-85199-261-7.
- "Musical Examinations". Dominion. Vol. 25, no. 125. 20 February 1932. p. 9.
- "Obituary. Upper Hutt Identity and Former Animal Research Centre Staff Member Dies". Upper Hutt Leader. 10 September 1991.
- "Personal". Otago Daily Times. No. 22482. 29 January 1935. p. 8.
- "Personal Items". The Press. Vol. LXXVI, no. 23091. 6 August 1940. p. 6.
- Puttick, Sir E. (1960). Official History of New Zealand in the Second World War 1939-45. 25 Battalion. Wellington: War History Branch, Department of Internal Affairs.
- "Research Work. Activities in Australia". The Evening Post. Vol. CXX, no. 1. 1 July 1935. p. 11.
- "Royal Dunedin Male Choir". Otago Daily Times. No. 21036. 27 May 1930. p. 13.
- Tenquist, John Douglas (1990). Wallaceville Veterinary Laboratory. Upper Hutt, New Zealand: MAF Technology, Wallaceville Animal Research Centre. ISBN 978-0-447-08124-4.
