= Alex Lindsay (violinist) =

New Zealand violinist (1919–1974)

Alex Sylvester Lindsay MBE (28 May 1919 – 5 December 1974) was a New Zealand violinist, conductor and orchestra leader. He was born in Invercargill, New Zealand, on 28 May 1919.

In the 1959 New Year Honours, Lindsay was appointed a Member of the Order of the British Empire, for services to music, especially orchestral work.
