= Harold Temple White =

Harold Temple White (24 December 1881 – 8 September 1972) was a notable New Zealand music teacher, conductor, organist and composer. He was born in Laceby, Lincolnshire, England, in 1881, and resided in Wellington for much of his life.
