= New Zealand Society of Animal Production =

Scientific society in New Zealand

- Formation: 1941
- Members: 418 (in 2015)
- Key people: John Ranstead (first president)
- Website: nzsap.org

The New Zealand Society of Animal Production (NZSAP) aims to foster research in all areas of animal production. The society was founded by scientists in 1941, and holds an annual conference, publishes the journal Proceedings of the New Zealand Society for Animal Production, and confers a number of awards.

== History ==
The society was founded in 1941 by a group of 66 scientists. The aims, which as of 2015 were unchanged, were stated as:

- "To provide an organisation to bring about active collaboration among those involved in the science of producing food, fibre and other products from animals.
- "To provide an annual meeting for members which will encourage both inter- and intra-disciplinary exchange and discussion of findings.
- "To assist young people in a manner that develops an interest in the science of food and fibre production.
- "To provide visions for the future of animal production in New Zealand.
- "To promote the value of science in the development of animal production.
- "To take such actions as may be deemed necessary to foster improvement in animal production."

== Activities ==
The society holds an annual conference, publishes the journal Proceedings of the New Zealand Society for Animal Production, awards grants, and confers awards. Awards include Life Membership of the society, the McMeekan Memorial Award (in honour of Mac McMeekan), the Sir Arthur Ward Award, a Living Legend Award, a Young Member Award, the Landcorp Farming Lecture, the NZSAP Innovation Award, the Jubilee University Award and the Lincoln University Centennial Award.

== Office holders ==
The first president of the society was John Ranstead. In 2004 the president was Catherine Morrow, and in 2007 it was David Scobie.
