= James Blakelock =

New Zealand doctor

James Hartley Blakelock (1903 – 27 August 1955) was a New Zealand medical doctor born in Chesterfield, England.

== Education ==
Blakelock was an achiever throughout his academic and working life. He took a B.Sc., with honours in Physiology in 1924 and graduated M.Sc. in 1925. Blakelock won the bronze medal for the fourth year M.B. at Sheffield University, graduating M.B., Ch.B. in 1926. In 1935, he took the D.P.H. of London University.

== Early career in England and China ==
Blakelock commenced work as a House Surgeon at the Sheffield Royal Hospital before working as Assistant Bacteriologist in the Public Health Laboratory of Sheffield University.

Moving to Shanghai, China, in 1928, he joined the Health Department of the Shanghai Municipal Council initially as Assistant Bacteriologist, before being promoted in 1935 to Director of the Medical Laboratory, a post that he held until 1941. During his time at the Laboratory, he had extensive experience in vaccine manufacture producing over a million doses of smallpox and cholera vaccine annually. He undertook over the years a variety of sanitary work, including malariology, mosquito surveys, experimental work on larvicides and plague work. This also involved a large amount of histology and the overall supervision of a laboratory dealing with 40–60,000 general bacteriological specimens and 2-4000 Wasserman and Kahn tests annually. After the outbreak of Sino-Japanese hostilities in 1932 and 1937 normal services were dislocated and Blakelock was seconded for refugee work which included the evacuation and reorganization of hospitals. He assisted on two occasions in the complete evacuation of two large hospitals while under shell fire. Blakelock supervised inoculation, sanitary and vaccination measures in refugee camps and the distribution of American Red Cross supplies of milk and food to refugees. He also established the first temporary isolation hospital in Shanghai.

== Career in New Zealand ==
Blakelock transferred to New Zealand whenJapan' entered the Second World War. He accepted the offer of a Medical Officer of Health position with the New Zealand Department of Health, serving first in the New Plymouth district from 1941 to 1944. During this period, Blakelock intensified diphtheria immunization, introduced whooping cough immunisation and carried out a pilot tuberculosis survey on Maori school children. A system of water sampling was introduced.

Blakelock was transferred in 1944 to Christchurch where he served as Medical Officer of Health, Canterbury and West Coast. He concentrated on immunising procedures, food and drug sampling and introduced water sampling by up-to-date methods. He also established an Orthoptic Clinic and also developed a mobile health education unit.

On the Metropolitan Milk Board and in the Canterbury Branch of the New Zealand Royal Society, Blakelock took steps to improve the quality and safety of Christchurch milk. He was active in tuberculosis work and was on the Public Health Committee of the North Canterbury Hospital Board and the executive of the Tuberculosis Association. Blakelock organised the first M.M.R. survey in Christchurch in 1950.

He took an active role in the work of the New Zealand Federation of Health Camps which saw him involved in the development of the Glenelg Health Camp.

== Establishment of the National Health Institute ==
In 1952, Blakelock was appointed first Director of the National Health Institute in Wellington. The Institute building itself was opened in 1954. During his brief tenure work was commenced on toxoplasmosis, influenza A and B, psittacosis, Q fever, mumps and lymphocytic chorio-meningitis. Virus isolation had also been attempted. A salmonella reference service had been initiated and a leptospirosis diagnostic service introduced. These latter services were administered by Sydney Josland, a bacteriologist who had previously worked at the Wallaceville Animal Research Centre. Other work included a rat population survey for the X. cheopis flea and the manufacture of T.A.B. and smallpox vaccine.

== Death ==
Blakelock died suddenly at his home in Wellington on 27 August 1955 at the age of 51.
