= Nina Agatha Rosamond Barrer =

New Zealand teacher and community leader (1879 -1965)

Nina Agatha Rosamond Barrer MBE (9 August 1879 – 17 September 1965) was a New Zealand teacher and community leader. She was born in Picton, Marlborough, New Zealand, on 9 August 1879.
