= Katherine McCall Anderson =

British military nurse (1866–1924)

Katherine McCall Anderson RRC & Bar
- Born: 5 January 1866; Glasgow, Scotland, U.K.
- Died: 7 April 1924 (aged 58); Glasgow, Scotland, U.K.
- Resting place: Glasgow Necropolis, Glasgow, Scotland, U.K.
- Known for: Military and civilian matron

Katherine Edith McCall Anderson RRC & Bar (5 January 1866 – 7 April 1924) was a civilian and military matron, receiving the Royal Red Cross (RRC) award for her service in the Second Boer War and the RRC Bar for her service in World War I.

== Early life ==
Katherine McCall Anderson was born in Glasgow, on 5 January 1866, the eldest daughter among the eight children of Sir Thomas McCall Anderson (1836–1908) and his wife Margaret (nee Richardson).

== Civilian nursing career ==
Anderson worked as a staff nurse, then sister at the Dundee Royal Infirmary, following her training there (1887–1890). She worked as an assistant matron of St George's Hospital, London (1903–1906), then matron at the Royal Victoria Infirmary, Newcastle (1906–1907) and appointed matron of St. George's Hospital, London (1907–1914).

== Military and later nursing career ==
Anderson served in the Princess Christian's Army Nursing Reserve in Bloemfontein during the Second Boer War and was mentioned in dispatches in 1901, subsequently being awarded the Royal Red Cross (RRC) award. On return to the United Kingdom, she maintained links with military-reserve nursing services.

In 1908, she was invited to join the national advisory committee at the War Office for the newly formed Territorial Force Nursing Service (TFNS). In 1910, she was elected to the committee of the City and County of London.

Anderson was actively involved in the St John Ambulance Association and on outbreak of the First World War appointed matron Lady Hardinge Hospital (for sick and wounded Indian soldiers) at Brockenhurst in Hampshire. The sisters employed to work for Anderson were all chosen because they could speak the Hindustani language. In 1916, the hospital was taken over by the New Zealand Medical Corps. At this point, Anderson joined Queen Alexandra's Imperial Nursing Service (Reserve) (QAIMNS(R)), training as a military matron at the Queen Alexandra's Military Hospital in London, following which she was posted to Bagthorpe Military Hospital, Nottingham, as matron.

She resigned from military-nursing service in 1919 and returned to Glasgow.

== Death ==
She died, aged 58, on 7 April 1924 and was buried in the Glasgow Necropolis.

== Honours and awards ==
- 1901 Royal Red Cross for nursing service in South Africa
- 1919 Royal Red Cross Bar

== See also ==
- List of nurses
- List of people from Glasgow
