= No. 2 New Zealand General Hospital =

- New Zealand Medical Corps
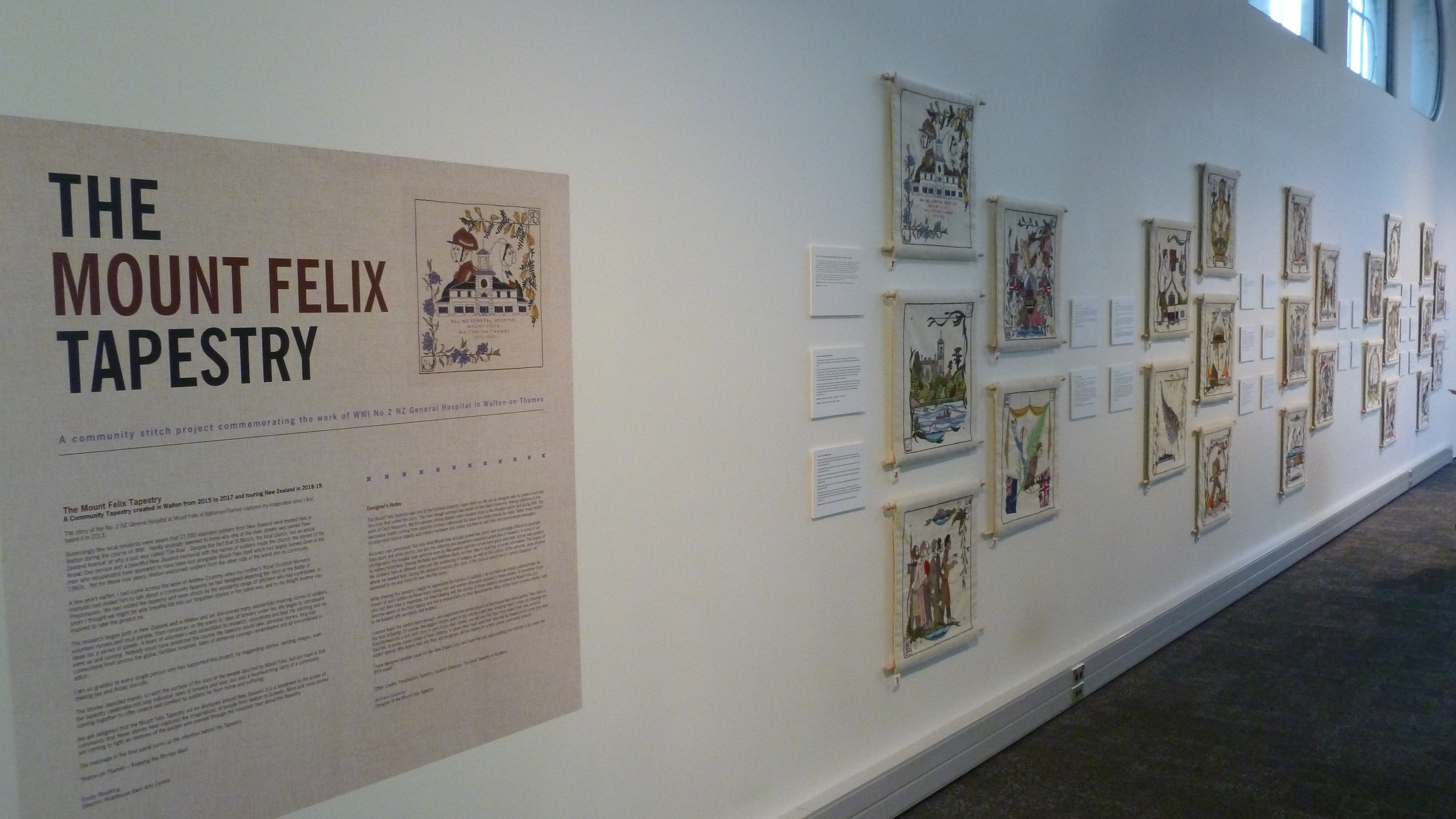
- The Mount Felix Tapestry which focuses on this hospital, on show at Toitū Otago Settlers Museum in Dunedin.

Geography
- Location: Mount Felix, Walton-on-Thames, Surrey, England / United Kingdom
- Coordinates: 51.3866°N 0.4256°W

Organisation
- Type: Military hospital
- Affiliated university: New Zealand Army Medical Service

History
- Founded: 1915
- Closed: 1920
- Demolished: 1967

The No. 2 New Zealand General Hospital was a World War I military hospital in Walton-on-Thames, England. The hospital opened in 1915 by requisitioning the essentially 15th century Mount Felix estate, a grand house with gardens, and closed in 1920.

It was the first hospital in the United Kingdom used specifically for soldiers of the New Zealand Expeditionary Force. In 1916 a new hospital was built in Brockenhurst, Hampshire, as the No. 1 New Zealand General Hospital, and Mount Felix was renamed as the number two hospital. Approximately 27,000 New Zealand soldiers were treated at the hospital during the war. The hospital was memorialised by the Mount Felix Tapestry which toured New Zealand in 2018 and the next year.

An auxiliary hospital Oatlands Park Hospital in Weybridge was set up for convalescing soldiers. Its matron was New Zealand nurse Edna Pengelly.

The buildings were demolished in 1967 to leave the clock tower and stable block – grade II listed buildings – which is by far the most abundant category of statutory protection and recognition.

The first matron of the hospital was Mabel Thurston who later became matron-in-chief of the New Zealand Army Nursing Service.

'2 General Hospital' was a unit of the New Zealand Medical Corps. The unit was re-raised in World War II and served with the 2nd New Zealand Expeditionary Force in Egypt, the Western Desert, Tunisia, and Italy. The unit is now called '2 (General Hospital) Field Hospital'.

== Site ==
The site four decades before the requisitioning was drawn by government survey as shown. The gardens to north (river) and south and east (road) came with these buildings.

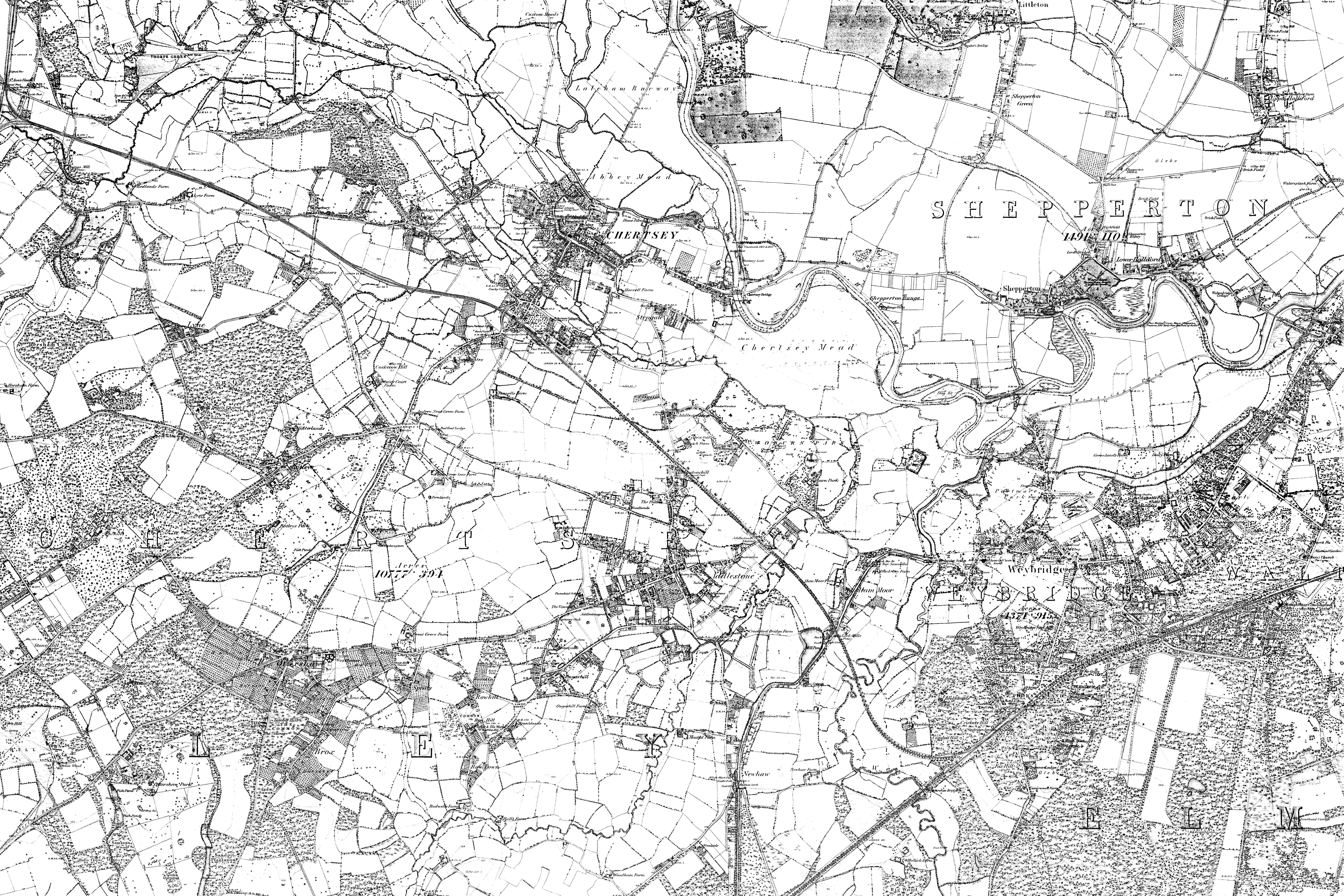
The dark rectangles are marked Mount Felix in the 1870s. Click for broader map and to enable varied magnification.

== See also ==
- Henry Percy Pickerill, a dental surgeon posted to the hospital
- John Staveley, doctor
- No. 1 New Zealand General Hospital
- No. 3 New Zealand General Hospital
