= Royal New Zealand Army Medical Corps =

- Active: New Zealand Medical Corps: 1908–1947; Royal New Zealand Army Medical Corps: 1947–present
- Country: New Zealand
- Branch: New Zealand Army
- Role: Medical support
- Mottos: Semper Agens, Semper Quietus (Always calm, always alert)
- Anniversaries: Corps Day (7 May)

Commanders
- Colonel-in-Chief: Prince Richard, Duke of Gloucester

The Royal New Zealand Army Medical Corps (RNZAMC) is a corps of the New Zealand Army, the land branch of the New Zealand Defence Force (NZDF). The Medical Corps provides for the medical needs of soldiers, such as diagnosing and treating diseases and injuries. Medical personnel are part of almost all Army exercises and operations, and personnel work in conjunction with personnel from the Royal New Zealand Dental Corps and the Royal New Zealand Nursing Corps.

== History ==
The New Zealand Medical Corps (NZMC) was established in May 1908 to provide a reserve of medical personnel should that be required in the event of war. After the declaration of war in August 1914, the New Zealand government sent a small contingent of medical staff to Samoa to take over the hospital at Apia. The contingent was made up of four medical officers, two dental surgeons, 67 non-commissioned officers and seven nurses.

Training for medics was initially undertaken at the Trentham Military Camp but from 1915 to 1919 medics trained at a camp set up at the Awapuni Racecourse in Palmerston North. The full range of medical personnel were trained, over a 16 week period, from Field Ambulance stretcher-bearers, hospital orderlies and medical staff for hospital ships. In 1929 a memorial to the medics killed in the war was unveiled at the racecourse; it was restored and rededicated in 2016 and is a Heritage New Zealand historic site.

As the war progressed and the number of casualties increased, it became apparent that more medical personnel were required to treat them. James Allen, Minister of Defence, offered to send medical personnel to a stationary hospital in Egypt, including eight officers and 50 nurses. New Zealand medical personnel went on to serve in Samoa, Egypt, Palestine, Gallipoli, France, Belgium, Serbia and Great Britain. Among the hospitals serving New Zealand personnel in Great Britain were No. 1 General Hospital, located at Brockenhurst in Hampshire; No. 2 New Zealand General Hospital in Walton-on-Thames; and No. 3 General Hospital at Codford. No. 2 General Hospital came under the control of the New Zealand Expeditionary Force in April 1916, and was located in the requisitioned 15th century Mount Felix estate until mid-1919. There were also another seven military hospitals of various types serving the Expeditionary Force in the UK, France, and Egypt.

As part of the 2nd New Zealand Expeditionary Force, three General Hospitals, three Field Ambulances, and a Convalescent Depot were dispatched to the Middle East (and 1 General Hospital and 5 Field Ambulance to the United Kingdom with the Second Echelon, temporarily) along with the remainder of the force.

On 12 July 1947 (Gazette No. 39/1947) the NZMC was granted a Royal Warrant and became the Royal New Zealand Army Medical Corps (RNZAMC). Queen Elizabeth The Queen Mother was the Colonel-in-Chief from 1977 to 2002. Later Prince Richard, Duke of Gloucester was appointed the Royal Colonel-in-Chief and presented the RNZAMC with the 'Prince Richard Banner'.

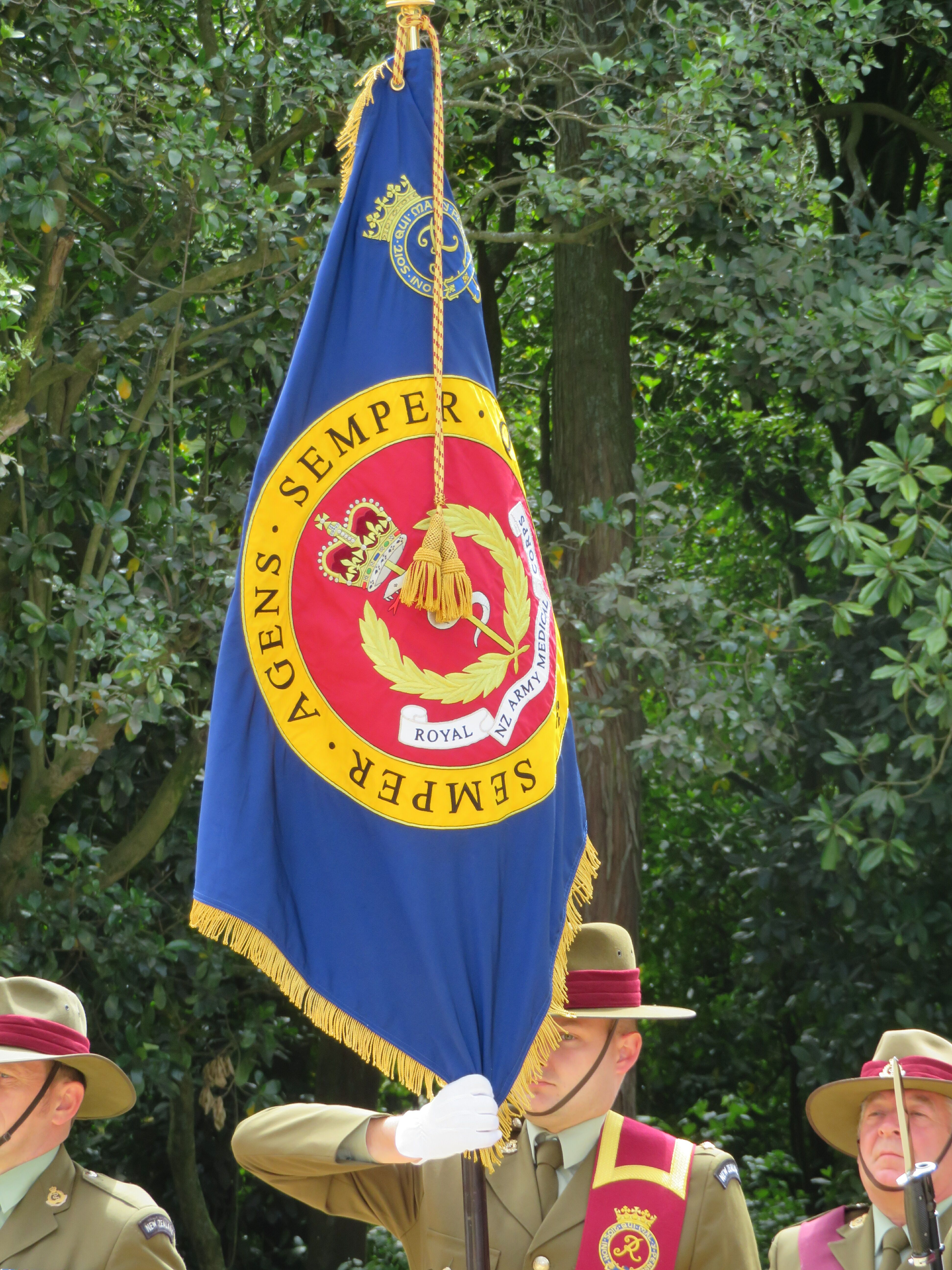
Banner of the Royal New Zealand Army Medical Corps

During the Cold War, the Army maintained hospitals and field ambulances. In 1991, 2 (GH) Field Hospital, tracing its descent from No. 2 General Hospital originally formed at Walton-on-Thames, celebrated its 75th anniversary. The Forward Surgical Team was deployed to East Timor while serving with INTERFET from 1999. The last Field Hospital was reorganised into 2nd Health Support Battalion in the mid-2000s, following an Australian example. The Battalion was located at Linton Military Camp. In 2015 the 2nd NZ Health Support Battalion was superseded by the Joint Operational Health Group (JOHG). JOHG, in turn, in 2017 was superseded and the Deployable Health Organisation (DHO) was formed and its Headquarters is based in Linton Camp. The DHO forms an integral part of the Joint Services Group (JSG) which is Headquartered in Trentham Camp.

=== Director of Medical Services 1st NZEF 1914–1915 ===
- Col W. J. Will VD 5 June 1914 – 27 August 1914
- Col James R. Purdy CBE, TD 27 August 1914 – 24 July 1915

=== Director General of Medical Services 1st NZEF 1915–1919 ===
- Col (Later Maj Gen) Sir Robert. S. F. Henderson KCMG, CB 24 July 1915 – 28 March 1919
- Maj Gen Sir Donald T. McGavin CMG, DSO, CBE 28 March 1919 – 30 November 1924

=== Director General of Medical Services ===
- Col Russell Tracey-Inglis CBE, VD 1 December 1924 – 30 November 1929
- Col Joseph L. Frazerhurst VD 1 December 1929 – 30 November 1934
- Col (Later Maj Gen) Fred T. Bowerbank OBE, ED 1 December 1934 – 31 March 1947

=== Director of Medical Services 2nd NZEF ===
- Brig Kenneth MacCormick CB, CBE, DSO, ED 1 October 1940 – 10 May 1942
- Brig Harry S. Kenrick CBE, DSO, ED 10 May 1942 – 18 September 1942
- Brig Kenneth MacCormick CB, CBE, DSO, ED 18 September 1942 – 17 April 1943
- Brig Harry S. Kenrick CBE, DSO, ED 17 April 1943 – 22 May 1945
- Brig George W. Gower CBE, ED 22 May 1945 – 11 October 1945

=== Deputy Director of Medical Services 2nd NZEF ===
- Col Francis B. Edmundson OBE 11 October 1945 – 10 February 1946

=== Assistant Director of Medical Services 2nd NZEF ===
- Col Harry S. Kenrick CBE, DSO, ED 1 October 1940 – 9 May 1942
- Col Patrick A. Ardagh CBE, DSO, MC 10 May 1942 – 16 February 1943
- Col Frederick P. Furkert CMG 16 February 1943 – 15 June 1943
- Col Russell D. King CBE, DSO 15 June 1943 – 3 December 1944
- Col Russell A. Elliot OBE, ED 3 December 1944 – 11 October 1945

=== Senior Medical Officer 2nd NZEF ===
- Lt Col Victor T. Pearse 11 October 1945 – 31 December 1945

=== Consultant Physician 2nd NZEF ===
- Col James R. Boyd CBE, MC 10 February 1941 – 22 February 1945
- Col Jack D. Cottrell OBE 22 February 1945 – 26 May 1945

=== Consultant Surgeon 2nd NZEF ===
- Col Sir Thomas D. M. Stout KT, CBE, DSO, ED 10 February 1941 – 13 August 1945

No. 1 NZ General Hospital was originally established in Egypt as the No. 2 NZ Stationary Hospital. Late it was moved to England on the New Zealand Hospital Ship Marama, in June 1916. After the unit has disembarked, it was deployed to Brockenhurst in the New Forest where it took over a hospital originally built for an Indian Division.

=== Commanding Officers of No. 1 NZ General Hospital Brockenhurst 31 July 1916–1919 ===
- Lt Col E. J. O'Neil CMG, DSO, VD 1916–1918

(Still researching this section)

=== Commanding Officers of 1 NZ General Hospital 1940–1945 ===
- Col A. C. McKillop 12 June 1940 – 10 June 1941
- Lt Col T. D. M. Stout (Later Colonel Sir T. D. M. Stout KT, CBE, DSO, ED) 10 June 1941 – 10 August 1941– Acting
- Col D. Pottinger MC 10 August 1941 – 11 August 1944
- Col W. B. Fisher 11 August 1944 – 24 February 1945
- Col D. G. Radcliffe 24 February 1945 – 3 November 1945

No. 2 NZ General Hospital started its life, in New Zealand, as the New Zealand War Contingent Hospital. It opened its doors at Mount Felix, Walton-on-Thames on the 31st of July 1915.

=== Commanding Officers of No. 2 NZ General Hospital Walton-upon-Thames 31 July 1915–1919 ===
- Lt Col T. Mill CMG, CBE 1916–1917
- Lt Col E. J. O'Neil, CMG, DSO, VD 1918–1919

No. 2 NZ General Hospital was dis-established in 1919

=== Commanding Officers of 2nd NZ General Hospital 1940–1945 ===
- Lt Col F. M Spencer OBE, ED 1940–1943
- Col H. K. Christie CBE, ED 1943–1944
- Col I. S. Wilson OBE, MC and Bar, ED 1944–1945
- Col H. D. Robertson MBE 1945-1945
- Lt Col A. W. Owen-Johnston ED 1945-1945

2nd NZ General Hospital was dis-established in 1945

=== Commanding Officers of 3rd NZ General Hospital 1940–1946 ===
- Col G. W. Gower CBE, ED 24 October 1940 – 22 May 1945
- Col J. E. Caughey 22 May 1945 – 17 October 1945
- Lt Col C. R. Burns 17 October 1945 – 9 January 1946

=== Commanding Officers of 4th NZ General Hospital 1940-1940 ===
- Lt Col E. L. Button 31 July 1940 – 9 September 1940
- Lt Col H. S. Kenrick 9 September 1940 – 1 October 1940

=== Commanding Officers of 5th NZ General Hospital 1944–1945 ===
- Lt Col D. G. Radcliffe 1 April 1944 – 20 February 1945
- Lt Col H. D. Robertson 20 February 1945 – 11 July 1945

=== Commanding Officers of 5th NZ General Hospital 1945-1945 ===
- Lt Col K. B. Bridge 23 October 1945 – 12 December 1945

=== Commanding Officers of the Convalescent Depot 1945-1945 ===
- Lt Col N. F. Boag 13 March 1940 – 27 December 1940
- Lt Col A. A. Tennent 27 December 1940 – 13 October 1941
- Lt Col A. L. de B. Noakes 13 October 1941 – 26 August 1945
- Maj J. W. Bartrum 26 August 1945 – 15 January 1945

=== Commanding Officers of the Haine Hospital (UK) 1945-1945 ===
- Lt Col A. A. Lovell 9 April 1945 – 9 October 1945

=== Commanding Officers of the 4th Field Ambulance 1939–1945 ===
- Lt Col J. H. Will 4 October 1939 – 3 September 1940
- Lt Col P. V. Graves 3 September 1940 – 13 October 1941
- Lt Col A. A. Tennent 13 October 1941 – 2 December 1941
- Lt Col R. D. King 8 January 1942 – 12 June 1943
- Lt Col J. K. Elliott 12 June 1943 – 30 April 1944
- Lt Col F. B. Edmundson 30 April 1944 – 8 December 1944
- Lt Col A. W. Owen-Johnston 8 December 1944 – 16 August 1945

=== Commanding Officers of the 5th Field Ambulance 1940–1945 ===
- Lt Col H. S. Kenrick 10 June 1940 – 26 May 1940
- Lt Col J. M. Twhigg 26 May 1940 – 2 December 1941
- Lt Col J. D. Cottrell 12 December 1941 – 12 January 1942
- Lt Col J. P. McQuilkin 12 January 1942 – 15 December 1943
- Lt Col R. A. Elliott 15 December 1943 – 23 June 1944
- Lt Col J. M. Coutts 2 July 1944 – 31 May 1945
- Lt Col D. P. Kennedy 5 June 1945 – 8 October 1945

=== Commanding Officers of the 6th Field Ambulance 1940–1945 ===
- Lt Col W. H. B. Bull 14 May 1940 – 6 May 1941
- A/Lt Col J. L. R. Plimmer 6 May 1941 – 20 May 1941
- Maj W. B. Fishing (Acting) 22 May 1941 – 16 June 1941
- Lt Col N. C. Speight 16 June 1941 – 2 December 1941
- Maj R. A. Elliott (Acting) 15 December 1941 – 24 January 1942
- Lt Col F. P. Furkert 24 January 1942 – 16 February 1943
- Lt Col W. B. Fisher 22 February 1943 – 31 July 1944
- Lt Col W. Hawksworth 31 July 1944 – 18 June 1945
- Lt Col F. B. Edmundson 18 June 1945 – 8 October 1945

=== Commanding Officers of the Mobile Surgical Unit 1941–1942 ===
- Maj F. P. Furkert 2 June 1941 – 17 January 1942
- Lt Col P. A. Ardagh 18 January 1942 – 27 February 1942

=== Commanding Officers of the 1st Mobile Casualty Clearing Station 1942–1945 ===
- Lt Col P. A. Ardagh 27 February 1942 – 10 May 1942
- Lt Col L. J. Hunter 10 May 1945 – 8 October 1943
- Lt Col E. L. Button 8 October 1943 – 29 June 1944
- Lt Col A. G. Clark 29 June 1944 – 6 August 1945
- Lt Col A. W. Owen-Johnton 6 August 1945 – 13 October 1945

=== Commanding Officers of 2nd NZ General Hospital 1948–1975 ===
- Lt Col E. L. Button OBE, ED 1948–1953
- Lt Col M. Williams ED 1953–1955
- Lt Col D. A. Ballantyne 1955–1958
- Lt Col R. C. S. Dick 1958–1962
- Maj G. P. Hallwright 1962–1963
- Lt Col C. M. Luke 1964–1965
- Lt Col A. W. Beasley CNZM, OBE 1965–1969
- Lt Col R. T. Aldrige 1969–1971
- Lt Col P. N. Leslie OBE, ED 1971–1975

2nd NZ General Hospital was renamed

=== Commanding Officers of 2nd NZ (GH) Field Hospital 1975–1990 ===
- Lt Col P. N. Leslie OBE, ED 1975–1977
- Lt Col R. B. W. Smith 1977–1980
- Lt Col M. A. B. Allan 1980–1983
- Lt Col G. T. Martin 1983–1986
- Lt Col D. M. A. Thurston 1986–1990

The 1st Medical Support Team transitioned into 2nd NZ Field Hospital.

=== Commanding Officers of the 1st Medical Support Team 1987–1990 ===
- Lt Col D. Roseveare 1987–1989
- Lt Col J. R. Gardner 1989–1990

=== Commanding Officers of 2nd NZ (GH) Field Hospital 1990–2004 ===
- Lt Col D. M. A. Thurston 1990–1991
- Lt Col G. H. Jull ED RNZDC 1991–1994
- Lt Col D. LePage 1994–1998
- Lt Col Ma. Shaab RNZNC 1998–1999
- Lt Col B. Hewson 1999–2001
- Lt Col P. Curran 2001 – Dec 2003
- Lt Col E. Williams 2003–2004

2nd NZ (GH) Field Hospital was dis-established and renamed

=== Commanding Officers of 2nd NZ Health Support Battalion 2004–2015 ===
- Lt Col E. Williams 2004–2005
- Lt Col O. Kaihu 2005–2008
- Lt Col P. Hanrahan 2008–2011
- Lt Col W. (B.) Twiss 2011–2013
- Lt Col D. Beck 2013–2015

=== Commanding Officers of Joint Operation Health Group 2015–2017 ===
- Lt Col S. Halligan, RNZAMC-December 2015 – December 2016

=== Commanding Officers of Deployable Health Organisation 2017–Current ===
- Lt Col J. Hutchings, RNZIR-December 2016 – January 2018
- Lt Col P. King, RNZE-January 2018 – December 2019
- Lt Col T. Downey, RNZALR-December 2019 – December 2021
- Lt Col K. McMillan, RNZAMC-December 2021 – 2023
- Lt Col G. Whitton, RNZAMC-December 2023 – Current

== Current training ==
Medical training for the entire New Zealand Defence Force is conducted at the Defence Health School which is located at Burnham Army Camp. All medics enlisted in the Army, Navy or Air Force are sent there for training. The medic training is conducted in two phases; Military Medical Technician and Medic. Within these two phases, students complete a Primary Health Care Phase and an Operational Phase. Each phase comprises an academic component and on the job experience. On the job experience is conducted at various camps, ships and bases within the NZDF. This is a total of two-and-a-half years of intensive training. After their training, medics are then posted to their respective camps and bases. Most gain overseas operational experience with the NZDF within a short time and become proficient and experienced across a wide range of pre-hospital environments. Medics can continue onto a range of degree or graduate level qualifications when their workload permits.

The Royal New Zealand Army Medical Corps also employs a wide range of other medical specialists from Doctors through to radiographers, environmental health officers and other health professionals.

== Order of precedence ==
Preceded by Royal New Zealand Army Logistic Regiment	New Zealand Army Order of Precedence	Succeeded by Royal New Zealand Dental Corps
