= No. 3 New Zealand General Hospital =

№ 3 New Zealand General Hospital
- New Zealand Medical Corps
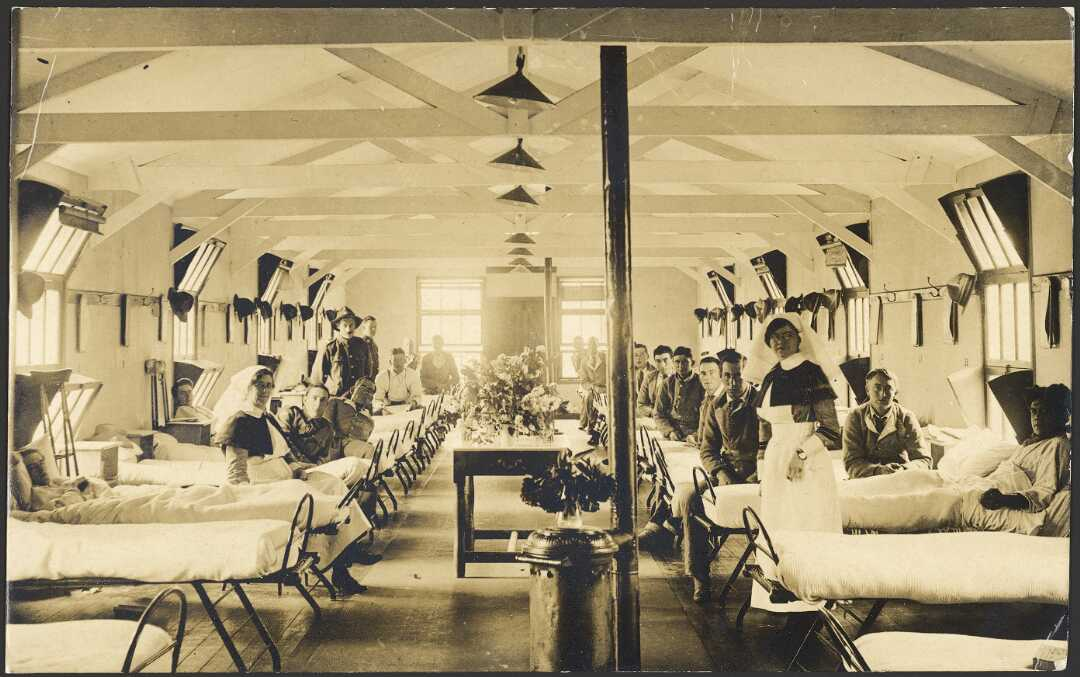
- The interior of a ward at No.3 New Zealand General Hospital (1917)

Geography
- Location: Codford, Wiltshire, England
- Coordinates: 51.160°N 2.041°W

Organisation
- Type: Military hospital

History
- Founded: 1916

Links
- Lists: Hospitals in England

The No. 3 New Zealand General Hospital was a World War I military hospital in Codford, Wiltshire, England.

The hospital was established in 1916 on the western rim of Salisbury Plain, taking over from a Royal Army Medical Corps hospital. Its site was just north of the eastern end of Codford village, near St Mary's church. It stood opposite the New Zealand Command Depôt known as Codford Camp, which accommodated 2,500 men, and also served the New Zealand presence at Sling Camp, about 12 miles (19 km) to the east.

The hospital initially had around 300 beds but this was later expanded to 1,000. Attached to the hospital was a venereal-disease (VD) section with 500 beds. The hospital extended to huts known as the No. 11 Camp, where many of the VD patients were treated. The VD section was separated from the rest of the hospital by barbed wire to prevent general convalescent patients from associating with those who had VD.

Though completely equipped much like its sister hospitals, No. 1 New Zealand General Hospital and No. 2 New Zealand General Hospital, number three did not take convoys of wounded, so dealt with mostly non-serious cases, such as pneumonia.

Edna Pengelly served as assistant matron at the hospital.

== Specific commemoration ==
One of the original 49 bells at the National War Memorial Carillion is named for the Codford Hospital. The Codford bell was given by returned soldier James Finlay in memory of Garfield Warin and Nurse Kathleen Hollis who worked at the hospital. Finlay contracted pneumonia whilst training, and was sent to the hospital for treatment.

== See also ==
- No. 1 New Zealand General Hospital
- No. 2 New Zealand General Hospital
