= Brockenhurst Church of England Primary School =

Location
- Sway Road; Brockenhurst; Hampshire, SO42 7RX; England
- Coordinates: 50.8166°N 1.5783°W

Information
- Type: Voluntary controlled school
- Religious affiliation: Church of England
- Established: 1752
- Local authority: Hampshire County Council
- Department for Education URN: 116276 Tables
- Ofsted: Reports
- Headteacher: John Littlewood
- Gender: Co-educational
- Age: 2 to 11
- Enrollment: 226 (July 2023)
- Website: www.brockenhurstceprimary.co.uk

Brockenhurst School, now Brockenhurst Church of England Primary School, is a former charity school in the English village of Brockenhurst, Hampshire. It was founded in 1752, funded by a legacy from Henry Thurston, a former coachman from the village.

== Benefactor ==
Henry Thurston was born in Brockenhurst, baptised at St. Nicholas in August 1692 and buried in the churchyard on 10 September 1745. He had been coachman to George Baker, attorney, of St. George's, Hanover Square, London, whose family home was Brockenhurst Farm – a substantial manor house.

== History ==
Brockenhurst School was established as a charity by the will of Henry Thurston and opened on 1 January 1752. In June 1749 the Thurston Estate stood at £573.0s.0d and invested in 3 percent annuities producing £17.3s.10d. p.a. for the benefit of the school. The Trustees were George Baker, Matthew Reynolds, George Etheridge and William Masters who first met on 30 September 1751 and the school opened on 1 January 1752 to provide for 10 poor boys and 10 poor girls.

The Trustees were to provide a house and to appoint a Master and Mistress at a joint salary of £10 p.a.; the rent for School House was £5 p.a. The location of the first school house is uncertain but for a time was at the house of Matthew Reynolds and a little later moved to Ash Cottage, still standing south of the railway crossing.

The new school building and house was completed on the present site in April 1863 and opened with 47 pupils, although by October the number had increased to 93. The school was enlarged in 1912 and again in 1999.
