= No. 1 New Zealand General Hospital =

- New Zealand Medical Corps
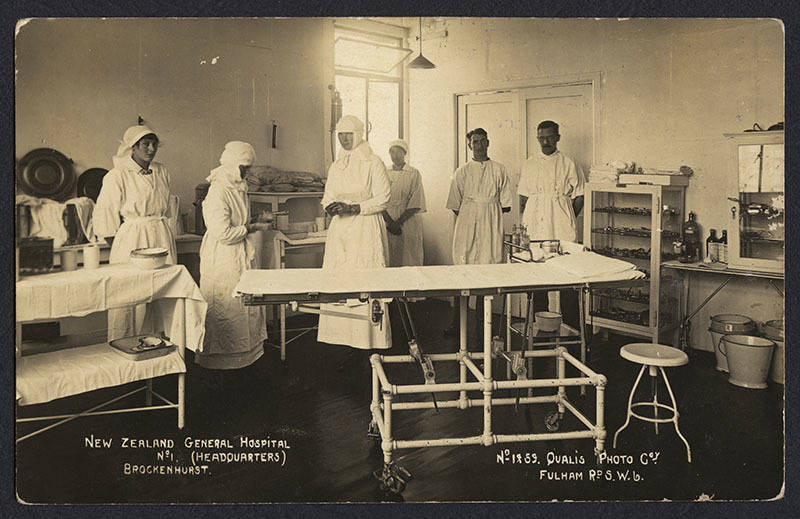
- Operation Theatre at the New Zealand General Hospital No.1, Brockenhurst

Geography
- Location: Brockenhurst, England
- Coordinates: 50°48′41″N 1°34′11″W

Organisation
- Type: Military

History
- Founded: 1916

Links
- Lists: Hospitals in England

The № 1 New Zealand General Hospital (1NZGH) was a World War I military hospital in Brockenhurst, Hampshire, England. The hospital was established in June 1916, after moving from Abasseyeh in Egypt. It was operated by the Royal New Zealand Army Medical Corps. It had been the Lady Hardinge Hospital for Wounded Indian Soldiers. When Katharine McCall Anderson became matron of the Lady Hardinge Hospital in 1914 it had 500 beds. She held this post for fifteen months.

Two large hotels in the parish: the Balmer Lawn Hotel and Forest Park Hotel were taken over and became a part of the new hospital, they could each hold 200 beds. 1NZGH became the orthopaedic centre for the New Zealand Medical Service in Britain.

On occasions during 1918 nearly 1,600 patients were accommodated at the hospital. Between 1916 and its closure 1919 the hospital cared for over 20,000 patients. Auckland Avenue and Auckland Place in Brockenhurst are named to commemorate the many New Zealanders who served at the Hospital during World War I.

Saint Nicholas Churchyard has 106 graves of those who died from the war including 93 New Zealanders, three Indian and three unidentified Belgian civilians.

== See also ==
- No. 2 New Zealand General Hospital, in Walton-on-Thames, England
- No. 3 New Zealand General Hospital, in Codford, Wiltshire, England.
