= New Forest Show =

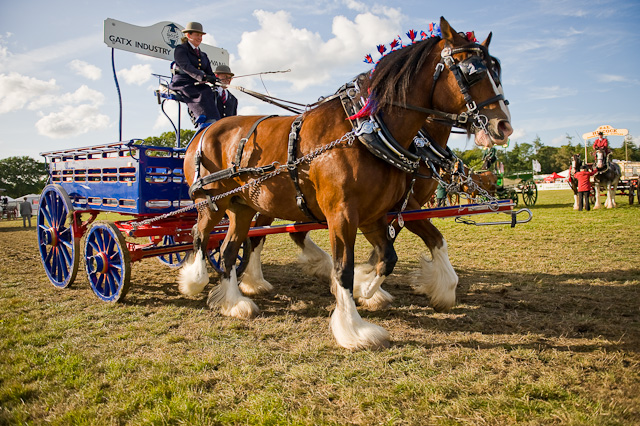
Heavy Horses in the East Ring, New Forest Show, 2009

The New Forest and Hampshire County Show, more commonly known as the New Forest Show, is an annual agricultural show event held for three days at the end of July in New Park, near Brockenhurst in Hampshire, southern England, UK. It was first held in 1920, and celebrated its 80th show in 2006. The show was cancelled twice due to the COVID-19 pandemic, delaying the centennial celebrations. The show is one of the largest agricultural events in the UK. The Heathcote Award, recognising dedication to agriculture over 30 or more years, is presented during the show.

== Event ==
The New Forest and Hampshire County Show is an annual agricultural show event held for three days at the end of July in New Park, near Brockenhurst in Hampshire, southern England, UK. The first New Forest Show was held on 1 September 1920, and was a one-day event. In 2006, it celebrated its 80th show. In 2020 organisers was to have celebrated the New Forest Show's Centennial, but the COVID-19 pandemic caused it to be cancelled two years in a row. The show returned in 2022.

The show is one of the largest agricultural events in the UK. It attracts over 100,000 visitors every year, and brings together a celebration of traditional country pursuits, crafts, produce and entertainment. Show jumping is another major feature at the show and there are competitive classes throughout all three days. A full range of equestrian classes also features, as well as livestock competitions including pigs, cattle and sheep, plus a poultry section, rabbits, cage birds, and honey bees.

During the show, the Heathcote Award is presented, which recognises "individuals who have dedicated 30 or more years of exemplary service in agriculture, forestry, equestrianism or horticulture within the New Forest or Hampshire County".
