= Mabel Thurston =

New Zealand nurse, hospital matron, army nursing administrator

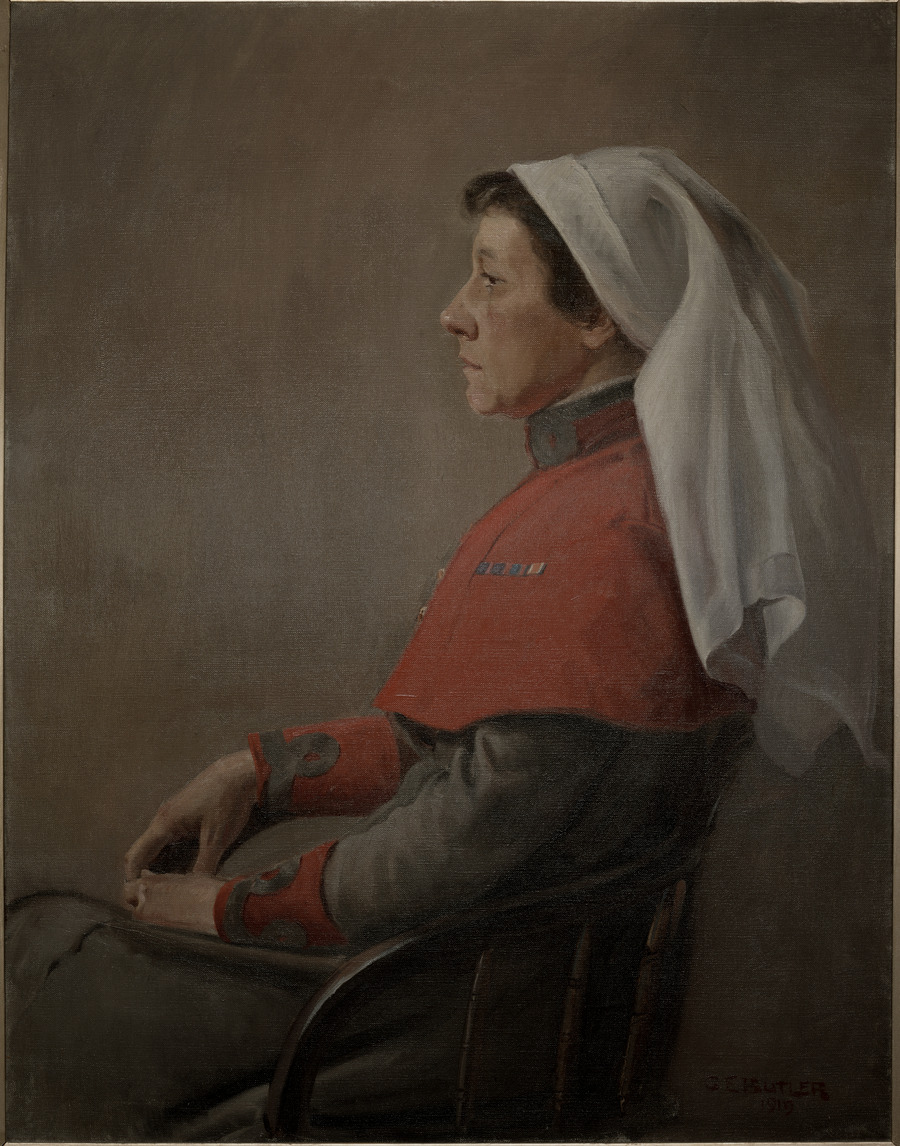
- Born: 22 July 1869; Manea, Cambridgeshire, England
- Died: 23 July 1960 (aged 91); London, England
- Military career
- Allegiance: New Zealand
- Branch: New Zealand Expeditionary Force
- Service years: 1916–1920
- Rank: Matron-in-Chief
- Commands: New Zealand Army Nursing Service (1917–20)
- Conflicts: First World War
- Awards: Commander of the Order of the British Empire; Royal Red Cross

Mabel Thurston, CBE, RRC (22 July 1869 – 23 July 1960) was a notable New Zealand nurse, hospital matron and army nursing administrator.

== Early life ==
Thurston was born in Manea, Cambridgeshire, England, on 22 July 1869 to Mary Ann (née Green) and her husband, Frederick Thurston, a pharmaceutical chemist. She emigrated to New Zealand in 1901 and trained as a nurse at Wellington District Hospital, which meant working 11-hour long days, seven days a week. After passing her examinations, she became a registered nurse in December 1904 and was appointed matron of Grey River Hospital in 1906.

In 1908 Thurston was appointed matron (also known as lady superintendent) of Christchurch Hospital, where she proved to be a popular and capable manager. While in Christchurch, Thurston took an active part in the Canterbury Trained Nurses' Association from its inception in October 1908 and subsequently became a leading member of the national association. She was president from 1914 to 1916 of the Canterbury branch Canterbury Trained Nurses' Association which required her to confront issues such as the conflict between trained and untrained nurses as well as the employment by doctors of untrained women to care for their private patients. She was responsible for ensuring the establishment of a benevolent fund to support trained nurses during periods of sickness or financial hardship.

== First World War ==
In March 1915, following the resignation of Annie Tombe as matron of No. 2 New Zealand General Hospital due poor health, Thurston was offered the position and she immediately decided to accept subject to the consent of the North Canterbury Hospital and Charitable Aid Board, even though it paid little more than half of her previous salary. The board unanimously agreed to grant Thurston leave of absence with Frederick C. Horrell, chairman of the board, and Mr H. B. Sorensen, chairman of the Hospital Committee, expressing their appreciation for her service, especially in the training of nurses, and voiced the opinion that her appointment would be an honour to the hospital and the board. Sub-matron Sister Rose Muir was promoted to act as matron during Thurston's absence.

Thurston took up her new position as matron at the end of June 1916. On 17 August 1916, Thurston also took on the additional duties of being in charge of the New Zealand Army Nursing Service (NZANS) in the United Kingdom, until in February 1917 she was appointed matron-in-chief of the NZANS. At this point Fanny Wilson took over Thurston’s duties as matron at Walton-on Thames. From January 1917 she worked full time from NZEF headquarters in London. Thurston's role as matron-in-chief made her responsible for NZANS nurses on active duty in the United Kingdom, France and Egypt, as well as organising the supply of nurses and Voluntary Aid Detachment (VAD) personnel to New Zealand's military hospitals in the United Kingdom.

Once she had seen the benefits of massage treatment, Thurston used her position as matron-in-chief to successfully push for the establishment of a physiotherapy school to teach New Zealand nurses in the various techniques at the New Zealand Convalescent Hospital at Hornchurch, which opened in March 1918.

== Inter-war ==
At the end of August 1918 the North Canterbury Hospital and Charitable Aid Board wrote to Thurston advising that they were terminating her employment as matron of Christchurch Hospital as her long absence had adversely affected the hospital due to a lack of a co-ordinated nursing service. The letter also implied that the acting matron had turned down offers of other jobs in her desire to remain in the post vacated by Thurston. Thurston responded by saying that she had understood leave had been granted for the duration of the war and that she intended to return to New Zealand as soon as it ended. At a meeting of concerned citizens in Christchurch called to chastise the board for its treatment of returning war workers, comments were made about the way it was treating Thurston. Despite letters of support from Colonel William Parkes (who had been director of the New Zealand Medical Corps in the latter half of the war) and Brigadier General George Richardson and others the board remained unmoved and terminated Thurston's appointment. In addition to paying her six months salary in lieu of notice the board also ended up paying her an additional amount of approximately £166 as due to the outbreak of the war she had been unable to take up the eight months of leave of absence on full pay that they had granted her in 1914. This drew the attention of the Audit Office who requested that each member of the Hospital Board contribute to reimbursing the board as they had voted money to Thurston after she had ceased to be in the board's employ.

Thurston returned to New Zealand in January 1920 and by March had taken up the position of matron at the King George V Military Hospital at Rotorua. From February 1923 to 1924 she was matron of Queen Mary Hospital, Hanmer Springs. In 1924 she applied for the position of matron of Dunedin Hospital and director of nursing with the Otago Hospital Board and was appointed to the position on 11 September 1924. However, a member of the public approached a board member and told him that she was not in the best of health and did not meet the board’s requirement that applicants be no more than 45 years of age, though a candidate of up to 50 years would he considered if they had special qualifications. Thurston had stated she was 49 years old on her application. The board subsequently asked for her to provide a satisfactory certificate of health and a certificate of age. Thurston declined to provide the requested certificates and withdrew her application. She was 55 years old at the time.

While Dunedin had concerns about her age it did not stop Thurston serving as matron at Pukeora Sanatorium in Waipukurau from 1924 to early 1927, after which she retired to England in that same year.

== Second World War ==
Although by now retired, Thurston was elected to the committee of the New Zealand War Services Association when it was formed in the early days of the Second World War and worked as an official visitor for the association for the duration of the war. With the exception of one period when she became ill from overwork, she traveled an average of 1,000 miles a month visiting New Zealand soldiers, airmen and sailors in British hospitals during the week as well as on weekend writing letters on their behalf to their parents. Originally, she made her visits by train, carrying heavy loads of gifts until the association provided her with a car and a female driver (first, A. Bauchop and later Betty Forsyth).

== Personal life ==
Thurston never married. She died in London on 23 July 1960.

== Honours ==
In 1917, Thurston was awarded the Royal Red Cross, first class. She was appointed a Commander of the Order of the British Empire in the 1919 King's Birthday Honours for her services during the First World War.

Thurston is honoured by a stained-glass window titled "The Conversion of St Paul" in the Nurses' Memorial Chapel in Christchurch. In her will she left £75 to the chapel, which may have partially paid for the window. The window was commissioned by former nurses who had trained under her and by many former patients and friends. Bishop Warren dedicated the window at the Florence Nightingale service on 10 May 1964. The window shows a saint as a soldier on the road to Damascus dedicating his sword to God.
