= Thomas McCall Anderson =

British physician and professor

Sir Thomas McCall Anderson
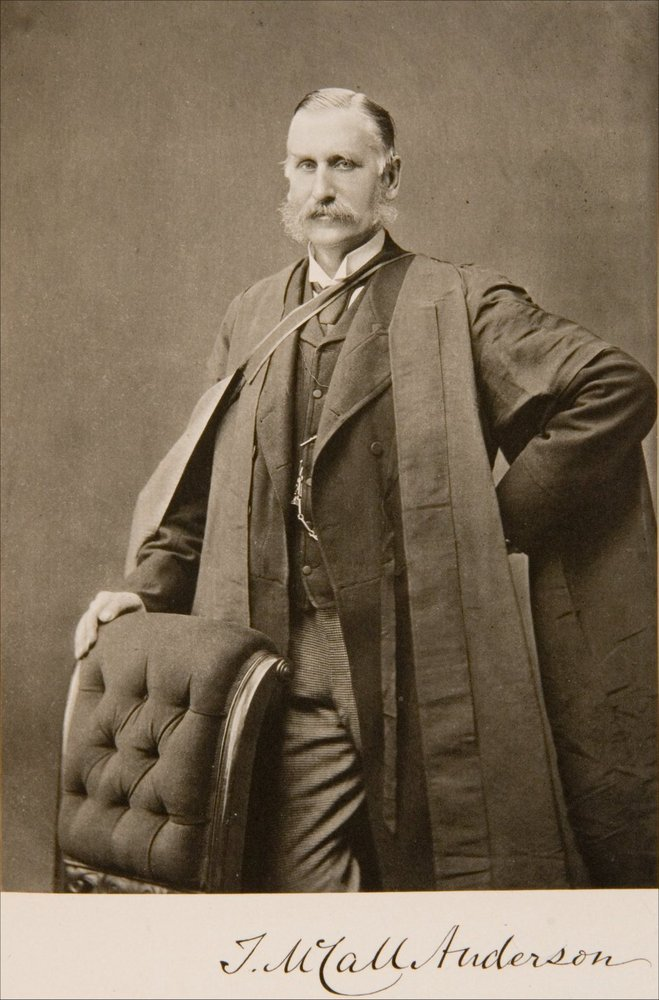
- Born: 9 June 1836; Glasgow, UK
- Died: 25 January 1908 (aged 71)
- Medical career
- Institutions: University of Glasgow

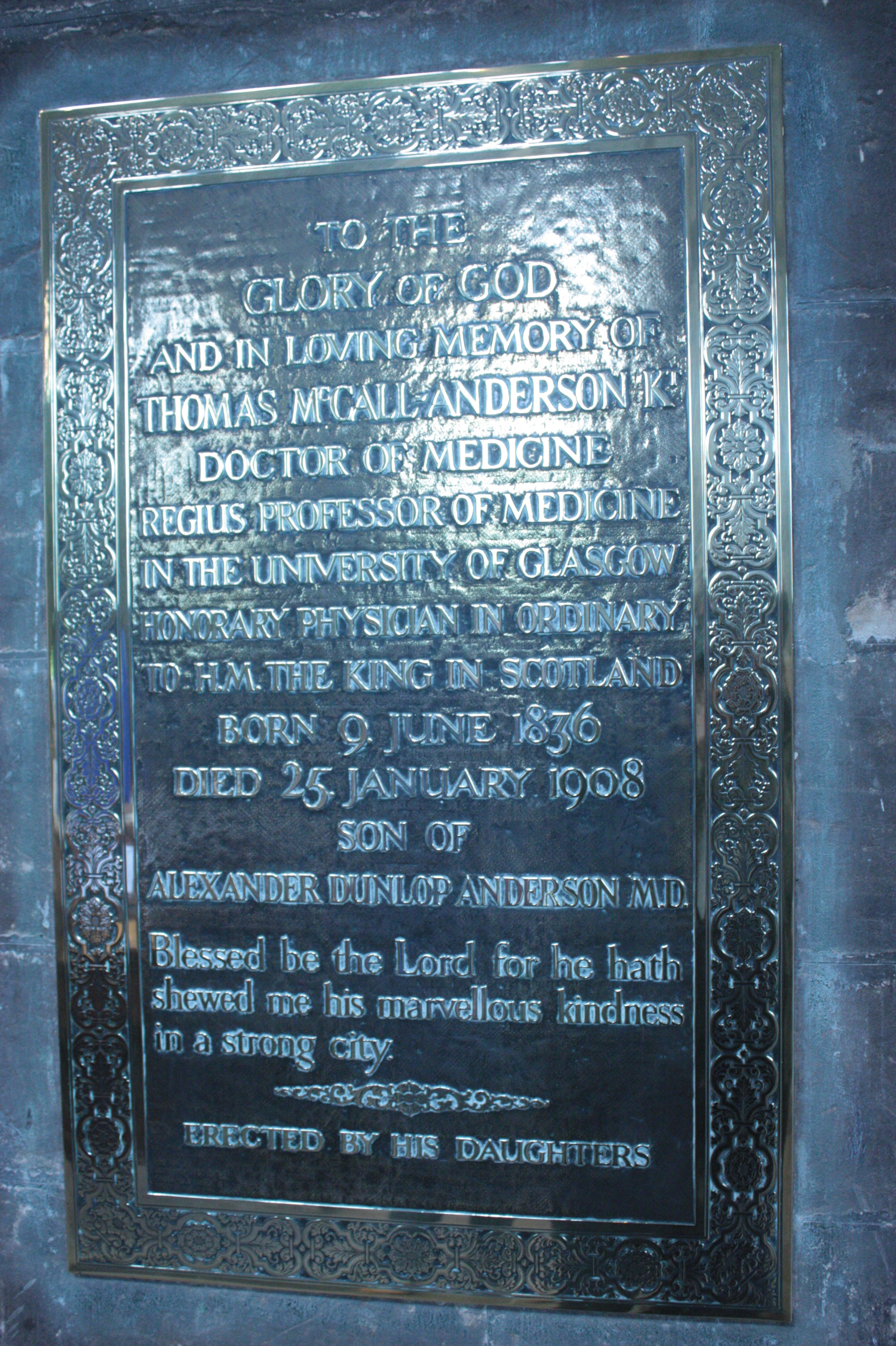
Monument to Thomas McCall Anderson, Glasgow Cathedral

Sir Thomas McCall Anderson (9 June 1836 – 25 January 1908) was a physician and a professor of practice of medicine at the University of Glasgow.

== Life ==
He was born in Glasgow on 9 June 1836, was second of three sons of Alexander Dunlop Anderson, M.D. medical practitioner in Glasgow, who in 1852 was president of the faculty of physicians and surgeons of Glasgow, by his wife Sara, daughter of Thomas McCall of Craighead, Lanarkshire. His father's family was descended on the maternal side from William Dunlop, principal of Glasgow University, 1690-1700; and in the male line from John Anderson (1668-1721), the stout defender of presbyterianism, and collaterally from John Anderson (1726-1796), founder of the Andersonian Institute, Glasgow.

After early education in Edinburgh, Anderson entered Glasgow University to study medicine. There in April 1858, he graduated M.D. with honours, and became a licentiate and fellow of the faculty of physicians and surgeons of Glasgow. Two years were spent as resident physician in the Glasgow Royal Infirmary; two more in travel and medical study at Paris, Würzburg, Berlin, Vienna, and Dublin. On returning home, he was speedily appointed lecturer on practice of medicine in the Andersonian Institute and, not long after, physician to the royal infirmary. There, the lucidity and skill of his clinical teaching attracted large numbers of students.

In 1861, a hospital and dispensary were founded at Glasgow for diseases of the skin. Anderson and Dr. Andrew Buchanan were appointed the first two physicians. Buchanan died prematurely in 1865. For forty-seven years Anderson bore the main share of the duty. In 1909, the institute was absorbed by the western infirmary, and the dermatological teaching was provided for by the foundation of a lectureship at the university, on which Anderson's name was conferred in recognition of his services.

Meanwhile, in 1874, Anderson was appointed to a newly founded chair of clinical medicine in Glasgow University. He held this post until 1900 in conjunction with that of physician to the western infirmary. His clear and systematic method of exposition and demonstration, his strict concentration on the subject in hand, and his organising power enabled him to fulfil his functions with admirable efficiency. From 1897 to 1901, he was examiner in medicine and pathology for the British and Indian medical services. In 1900, he succeeded Sir William Tennant Gairdner, in the chair of practice of medicine, and removed from his house in Woodside Terrace to the official residence in the college square. The practical aspects of his subject chiefly appealed to him. The physician's business, he insisted, was to cure the sick. But he took a high view of the moral responsibilities of a medical adviser, and never suffered his pupils to forget that medicine is a liberal profession as well as a useful art.

For many years Anderson engaged in extensive consulting practice. His opinion was especially valued, not only in skin diseases, in which he long specialized and his eminence in which was recognised in England and on the Continent, but also in consumption, in the curability as well as in the prevention of which he was a believer, and in certain forms of paralysis. In 1903, he was appointed university representative on the general medical council; he was knighted in 1905; in 1906, he was entertained at a public dinner by representatives of the medical profession in the west of Scotland, including many former pupils and assistants; in 1908, he was made honorary physician to the king in Scotland.

A conservative in politics, and in religion a member of the Church of Scotland, Anderson was genial in society and obliging in disposition.

He died suddenly on 25 January 1908, after speaking at the dinner of the Glasgow Ayrshire Society. He was honoured with a public funeral in the Glasgow Necropolis. A memorial to his memory also exists on the inner north wall of Glasgow Cathedral at the foot of the Necroplis.

== Family ==
Anderson married on 20 July 1864 Margaret Richardson Ronaldson, daughter of Alexander Ronaldson, a merchant from Glasgow. They had eight children. Among them were Katherine Edith McCall Anderson RRC (1866–1924), who was a notable military nurse and matron in the UK, and Thomas McCall Anderson (1882–1939), who practised medicine in New York, USA.

== Works ==
Anderson's chief publications were:

1. The Parasitic Affections of the Skin, 1861; 2nd edit. 1868.
2. On Psoriasis and Lepra, 1865.
3. On Eczema, 1867, 3rd edit. 1874.
4. Treatment of the Diseases of the Skin, with an Analysis of 11,000 Consecutive Cases, 1872.
5. Lectures on Clinical Medicine, 1877.
6. Curability of Attacks of Tubercular Peritonitis and Acute Phthisis (Galloping Consumption), 1877.
7. A Treatise on Diseases of the Skin, 1887; 2nd edit. 1894.
8. On Syphilite Affections of the Nervous System, their Diagnosis and Treatment, 1889.
