= Royal New Zealand Dental Corps =

- Active: 1915–present
- Country: New Zealand
- Branch: New Zealand Army
- Role: Dental support
- Mottos: Ex Malo Bonum (From evil comes good)

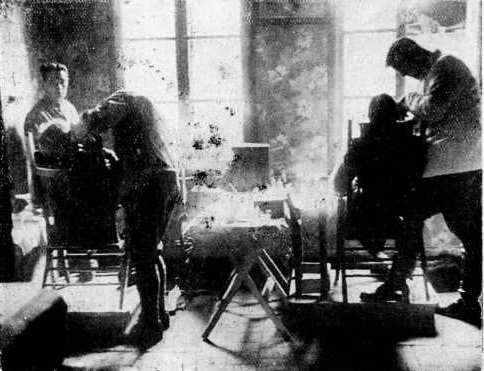
New Zealand dental surgery in France during World War I

The Royal New Zealand Dental Corps (RNZDC) is a corps of the New Zealand Army. The corps was initially formed on 7 November 1915 as the New Zealand Dental Corps under the command of Lieutenant Colonel Thomas Hunter, as part of New Zealand's contribution to World War I. The corps was formed from personnel who were transferred from the New Zealand Medical Corps, who were charged with ensuring the dental fitness of New Zealand troops being sent overseas, and for the provision of emergency dental care in the field. The royal designation was adopted in 1947.

Today, the corps consists of full-time and part-time commissioned officers and soldiers who are employed in a tri-service environment, using their specialist skills and knowledge as dental officers, dental hygienists and dental assistants. The corps works in conjunction with the Royal New Zealand Army Medical Corps and the Royal New Zealand Nursing Corps to promote "health and disease prevention" and to provide "care for the wounded and sick".

Throughout the corps' history, personnel have been deployed to various operational theatres. Aside from service during World War I and World War II, the corps has deployed personnel in support of a number of operations including most recently in Afghanistan.

== Order of precedence ==
| Preceded by Royal New Zealand Army Medical Corps | New Zealand Army Order of Precedence | Succeeded by Royal New Zealand Chaplains' Department |
