= Edna Pengelly =

Teacher, civilian and military nurse, matron

Edna Pengelly (5 July 1874 – 20 August 1959) was a New Zealand teacher, civilian and military nurse and matron.

== Early life and education ==
Pengelly was born in Canada in 1874 and came to New Zealand as a child. She attended primary schools in Waddington and Annat in Canterbury. She then attended Christchurch West School before boarding at Christchurch Girls' High School.

== Career ==
Pengelly taught in Rangiora after leaving school. She did her nursing training at Wellington Hospital and continued to work there after she gained her nursing registration in 1908. She was also matron of the nurse's home.

During World War 1 she served with the New Zealand Army Nursing Service in Egypt and England. She left New Zealand in 1915 on the ship Rotorua. She published some experiences of nursing in Egypt in the nursing journal Kai Tiaki in 1916. In England she was assistant matron at the No. 3 New Zealand General Hospital at the camp in Codford in Wiltshire and then took charge of the Oatlands Park Hospital, an off-shoot of the No. 2 New Zealand General Hospital in Weybridge, Surrey for convalescing New Zealand soldiers.

She returned to New Zealand in 1919 to become matron of Queen Mary Hospital in Hanmer Springs, a hospital providing rehabilitation services for returned servicemen. From 1921 to 1929 she was matron of a private hospital in Hobson St in Wellington, after which she became matron at Whanganui Collegiate School until 1937. In 1956 she published her diaries Nursing in peace and war which were one of the few accounts of a nurse's wartime service. She retired in 1941.

Pengelly died in Wellington Hospital on 20 August 1959.

== Awards ==
Pengelly was awarded two medals in World War 1: the Associate Royal Red Cross in 1917 and the Royal Red Cross in 1919.
