= Brockenhurst =

Village in Hampshire, England

Coordinates: 50.82°N 1.58°W

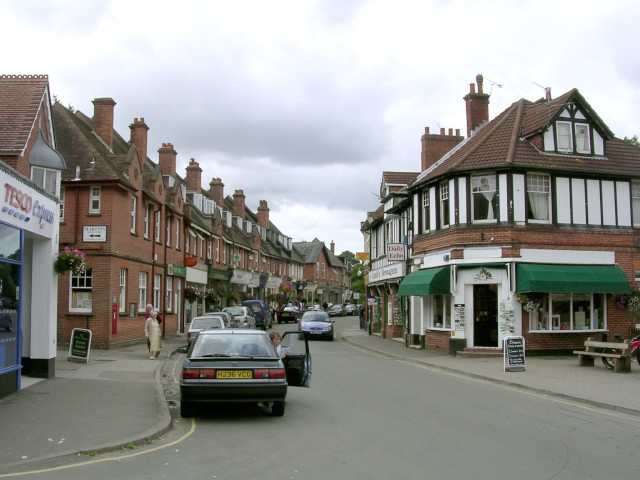
- Brockenhurst village centre

- Location within Hampshire
- Population: 3,552 (2011 Census)
- OS grid reference: SU300022
- District: New Forest
- Shire county: Hampshire
- Region: South East
- Country: England
- Sovereign state: United Kingdom
- Post town: BROCKENHURST
- Postcode district: SO42
- Dialling code: 01590
- Police: Hampshire and Isle of Wight
- Fire: Hampshire and Isle of Wight
- Ambulance: South Central
- UK Parliament: New Forest East

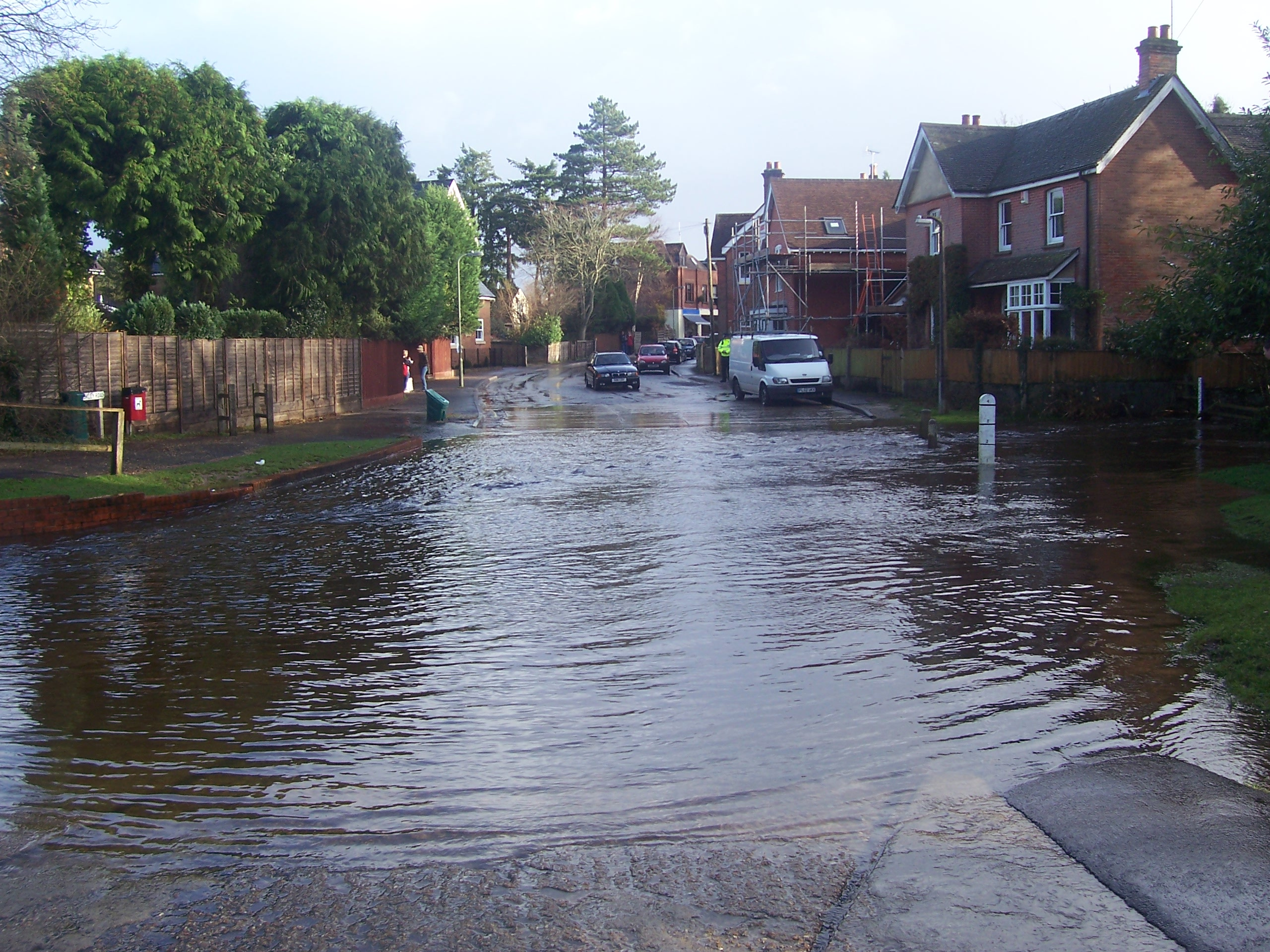
The ford at Brockenhurst, following heavy rain.

Brockenhurst is a large village in the New Forest district of Hampshire, England. Southampton is 13 miles (21 km) to the north-east, and Bournemouth is 15 miles (24 km) south-west. Surrounding towns and villages include Beaulieu, Lymington, Lyndhurst, and Sway.

== History ==
The earliest signs of habitation in Brockenhurst date back 4,000 years to the Bronze Age: the area is dotted with burial mounds – called tumuli. Beyond that, few signs remain of other habitation during the subsequent 3,000 years.

=== Middle Ages ===
The Saxon period was brought to an end by the events of 1066.

William the Conqueror created his Nova Foresta traditionally in 1079, a vast hunting area lying south and west of his capital at Winchester; it stretched south to the coast at Barton on Sea and west to what is now Bournemouth. In 1086, the Domesday Book recorded that there were four small Saxon manors in the Brockenhurst area, Mapleham, Hincelveslei, Brochelie and Broceste. Mapleham no longer exists, probably being subsumed within Brookley; the name Hincelveslei has become Hinchelsea which lies to the west of Brockenhurst. The third manor, Brochelie, gives the modern name, Brookley, which was granted a regular weekly market and an annual fair, lasting several days, in 1347. Brochelie had forest rights to graze sheep on the open forest, but only between Wilverley and what is now Rhinefield Road, this right is usually associated with religious houses and was probably attached to the medieval estate which Christchurch Priory held at Brookley.

The manor house of Brochelie was situated on the plot formerly occupied by the Watersplash Hotel and now the Holmwood apartments built by Pegasus Homes and opened in 2019. Its manor itself extended over the lands on the western side of the A337 Lyndhurst-Lymington Road.

The fourth Saxon manor of the area was Broceste which gives the village its name. It was the most important manor, being a grand-serjeanty held by providing accommodation for the King when hunting in the area.

Royden to the south of Brockenhurst was a medieval grange belonging to Netley Abbey and was set up by a grant made by Henry III in 1253.

St Nicholas' Church, at that time, was no more than an outlying chapel linked to Twynham – later Christchurch Priory. William Rufus visited Brockenhurst, possibly worshiping in St Nicholas' church, as at least two writs were issued by him from here.

=== Early modern era ===
By the 18th century, nearby Lymington was a thriving town, due to its port and the manufacture of salt from sea water. In 1765, the Lymington road became a turnpike, under the Lymington, Lyndhurst and Rumbridge Turnpike Act, and a regular route for the mail coaches from Lyndhurst and the north. During this time, Brockenhurst grew in size, with dwellings and inns strung along the main road.

In 1745, Henry Thurston, a local man who left to make his fortune in London, died, leaving a bequest to set up a school in the village. After being held in a number of houses it became fixed in a cottage on the corner of what is now Mill Lane and the A337.

A tower was added to St. Nicholas' Church between 1758 and 1763.

In 1770, Edward Morant, using some of the vast wealth that flowed from the family estates in Jamaica, purchased Brockenhurst House – a late Stuart farmhouse – for £6,400. He rebuilt it as a large Georgian mansion, while he and his heirs laid out avenues in the grounds and acquired adjacent land, eventually peaking at some 3,000 acres (12 km^{2}).

In the 19th century the railway station was introduced to Brockenhurst, increasing a large number of holiday visitors and the local population.

Brockenhurst gained its second Church of England church in 1903 in the form of St Saviour's. The reason for its construction was that Mabel Walker-Munro didn't want to use the same church as members of the Morant family.

=== First World War ===
In the First World War, Brockenhurst hosted the Lady Hardinge Hospital for Wounded Indian Soldiers. The name Meerut Road recalls the Indian troops of the Meerut and Lahore Divisions who fought on the Western Front in the war and were patients at Brockenhurst. Specialist sections were also established in the Balmer Lawn and Forest Park Hotels.

The hospital was later transferred to the New Zealand Army and, as No. 1 New Zealand General Hospital, continued in use until 1919. Auckland Avenue and Auckland Place commemorate the stay of the New Zealanders.

Wounded New Zealand soldiers on station platform at Brockenhurst between 1917 and 1919

Medical staff and patients at WW1 New Zealand First General Hospital, Brockenhurst, during 1917–19.

=== Interwar ===
Cass Gilbert, the noted American architect of the Woolworth Building and many other structures, died in the town in 1934. The Roman Catholic church of St Anne was built between 1937 and 1939.

=== Second World War ===
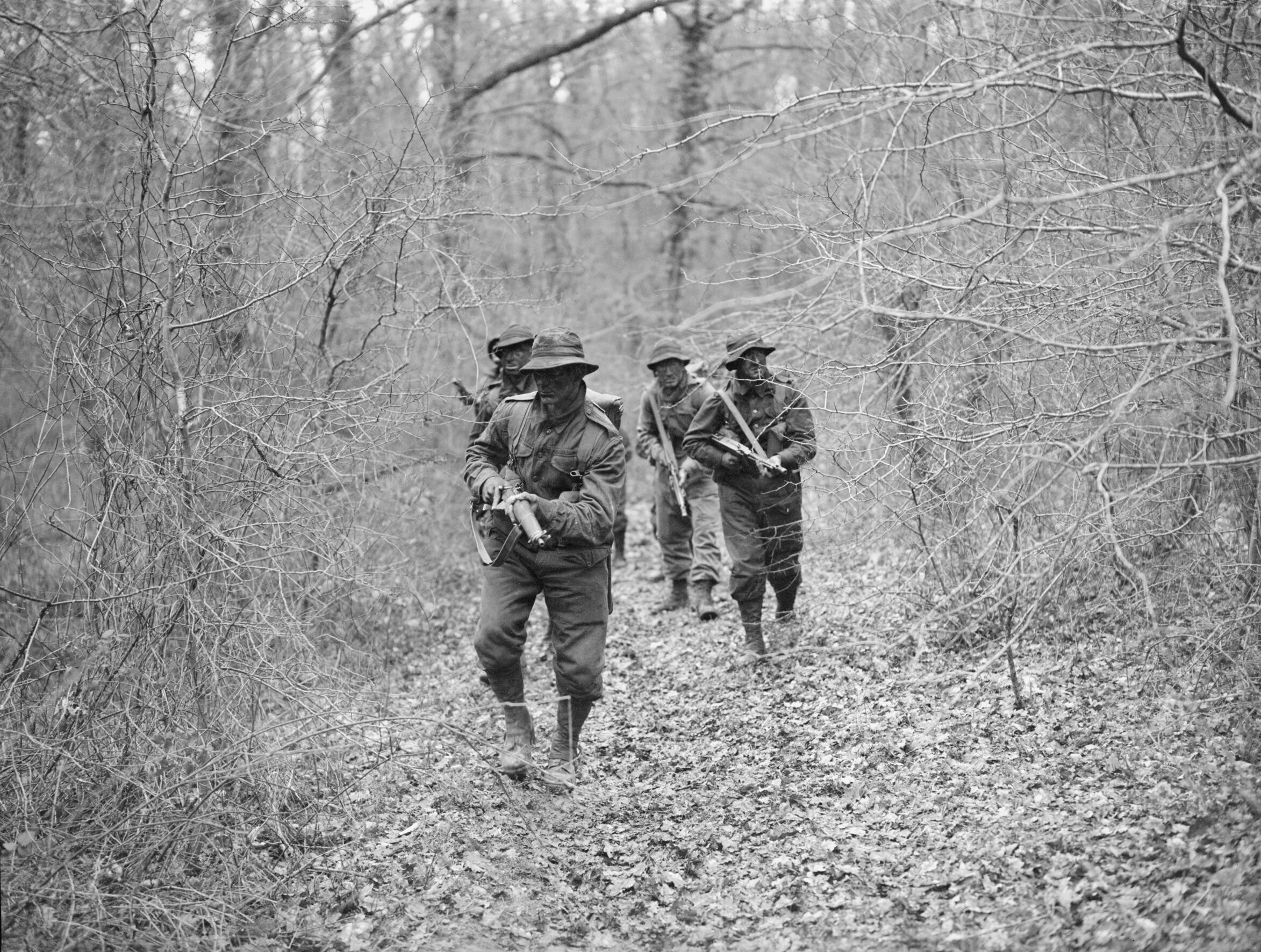
2 February 1945. Royal Marine/Royal Navy trainees, their faces covered with camouflage paint and wearing US-style fatigue caps and gaiters, during training at the Eastern Warfare School, learning jungle tactics, before deployment to the Pacific War.

In the Second World War, what is now The Balmer Lawn Hotel was often used as a Divisional HQ and was the location of many of Generals Montgomery and Eisenhower's meetings, away from their headquarters in Southsea, as they planned the D-Day Landings in Normandy.

In early 1944, Brockenhurst also became a secret training area for troops preparing to do battle in Normandy. The area's ancient oak trees were ideal for concealing military vehicles. The 50th (Northumbrian) Infantry Division, the core of Assault Force "G", tasked with storming Gold Beach on D-Day, had its HQ at the Carey's Manor Hotel.

Afterwards, the Eastern Warfare School, near Brockenhurst, taught jungle infantry tactics suited to the Asian and Pacific campaigns, to personnel from the Royal Marines and shore units of the Royal Navy.

=== Since 1945 ===
The western part of the village greatly expanded in the 1970s and, in the early 1990s, Berkeley Homes built Ober Park, which is now known as The Coppice, this despite having been known as Clerks (or variations thereof) from the 13th to 19th centuries. More construction of the village still continues today by Pennyfarthing Homes.

== Sport and leisure ==
=== Football ===
Brockenhurst F.C. was founded in 1898 and plays at Grigg Lane, the current manager is Danny Ackland. In season 2012/13 the club returned to the Wessex Premier Football League as Division One champions and reached the final of both the Southamption DFA Senior Cup and the Wessex League Cup. During a Hampshire Senior Cup match Brockenhurst (and Andover Town) set a new record when they scored 29 consecutive penalties in a shoot-out after the tie had finished 0–0. After 29 successful attempts (a total confirmed by the Football Association as an English record) Andover missed and 'The Badgers' won the tie.

=== Cricket ===
Brockenhurst Cricket Club was founded in 1797 and has been situated on the Balmer Lawn for over 150 years. Brockenhurst Cricket Club has two senior Saturday teams that compete in the Hampshire Cricket League, a Friendly Sunday XI team, and a junior section that play in the New Forest District Cricket league.

== Transport ==
Brockenhurst railway station offers frequent South Western Railway services to Bournemouth, London Waterloo, Southampton and Weymouth. CrossCountry express services also run twice daily to Manchester via Birmingham.

The station is the junction where the branch line to Lymington Pier connects to the mainline. The "Lymington Flyer" services connect with the ferry to Yarmouth on the Isle of Wight. The branch line's self-contained nature permitted the use of slam-door rolling stock, until this was withdrawn in 2010. In 1967 it was the last standard-gauge branch line in the south of England to cease using steam haulage. Historically, before the infamous Beeching Cuts in the 1960s, services ran to Ringwood from Brockenhurst via Holmsley and others.

Bus transport is provided mainly by Bluestar service 6 to Lymington and Southampton (Previously the Wilts & Dorset 56 and 56A, the 6 now runs the route of the 56A). In the summer, the New Forest Tour serves the village and station.

== Twinning ==
Brockenhurst is twinned with Pont St Martin, in Loire-Atlantique, France.

== Places of interest ==
- Brockenhurst Church of England Primary School
- Brockenhurst College
- Brockenhurst railway station
- Lymington Flyer – Heritage line
- New Forest Show
- St. Nicholas' Church
- Setley Lodge

== Gallery ==
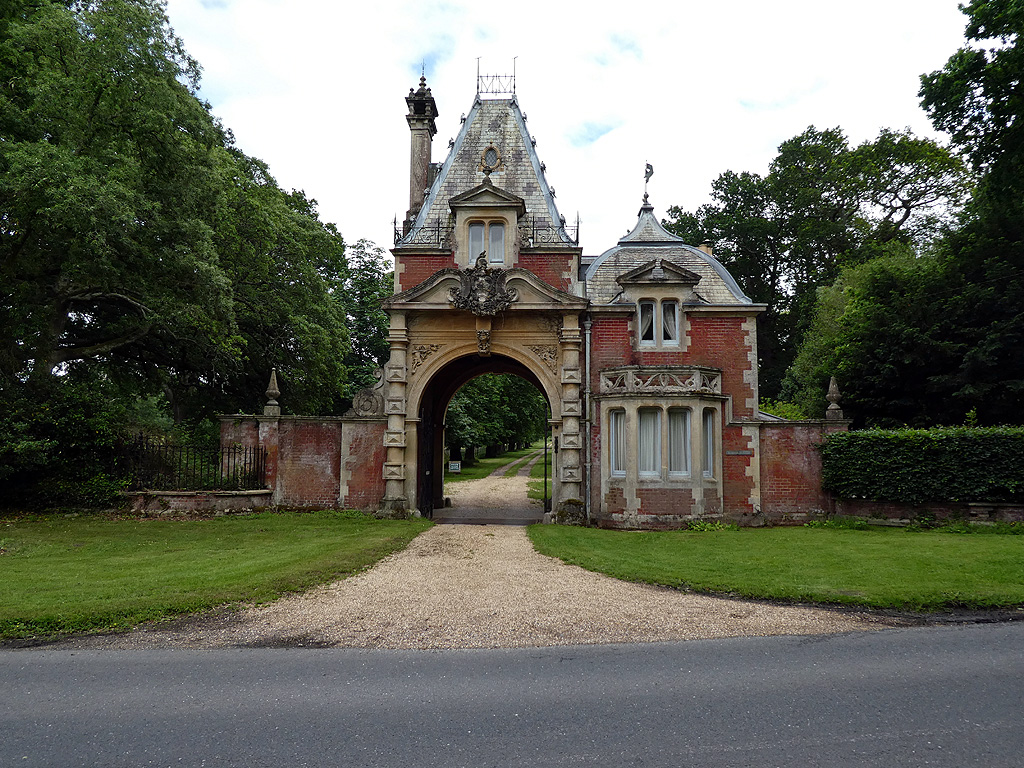
Gatehouse. Brockenhurst Park

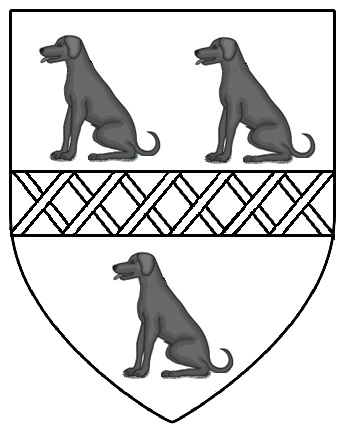
Coat of arms Morant

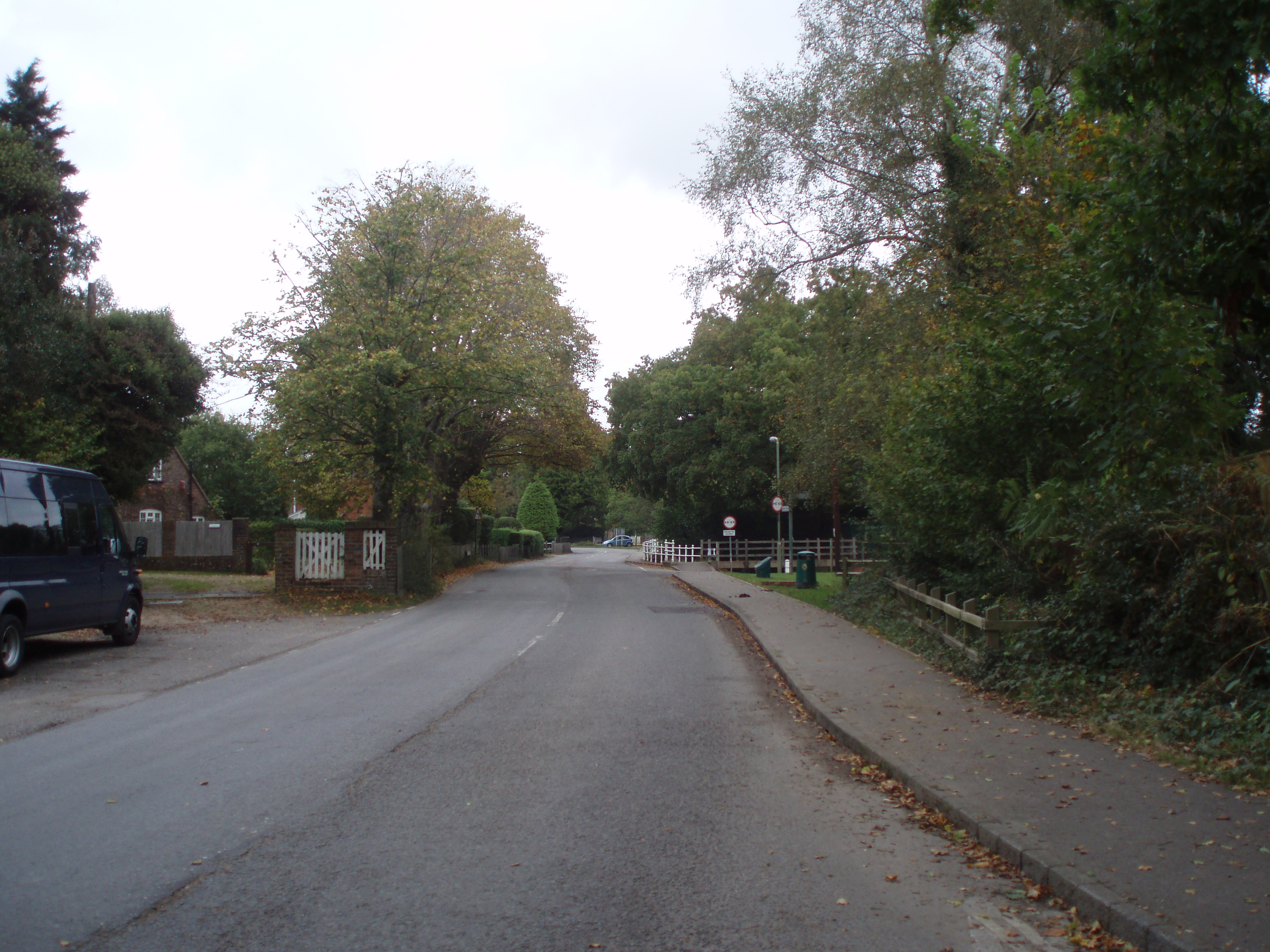
The Rise

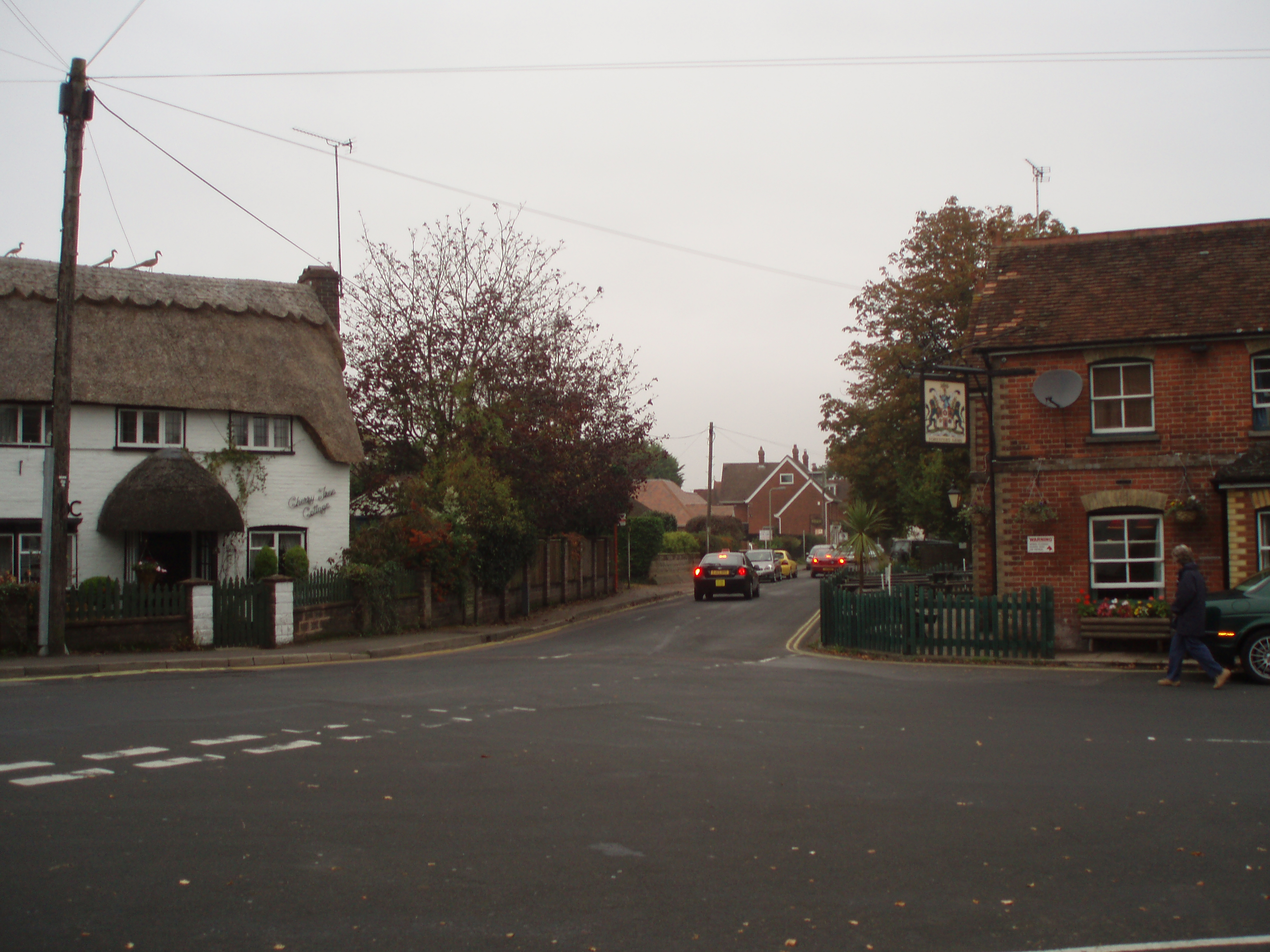
Thatched cottage and pub

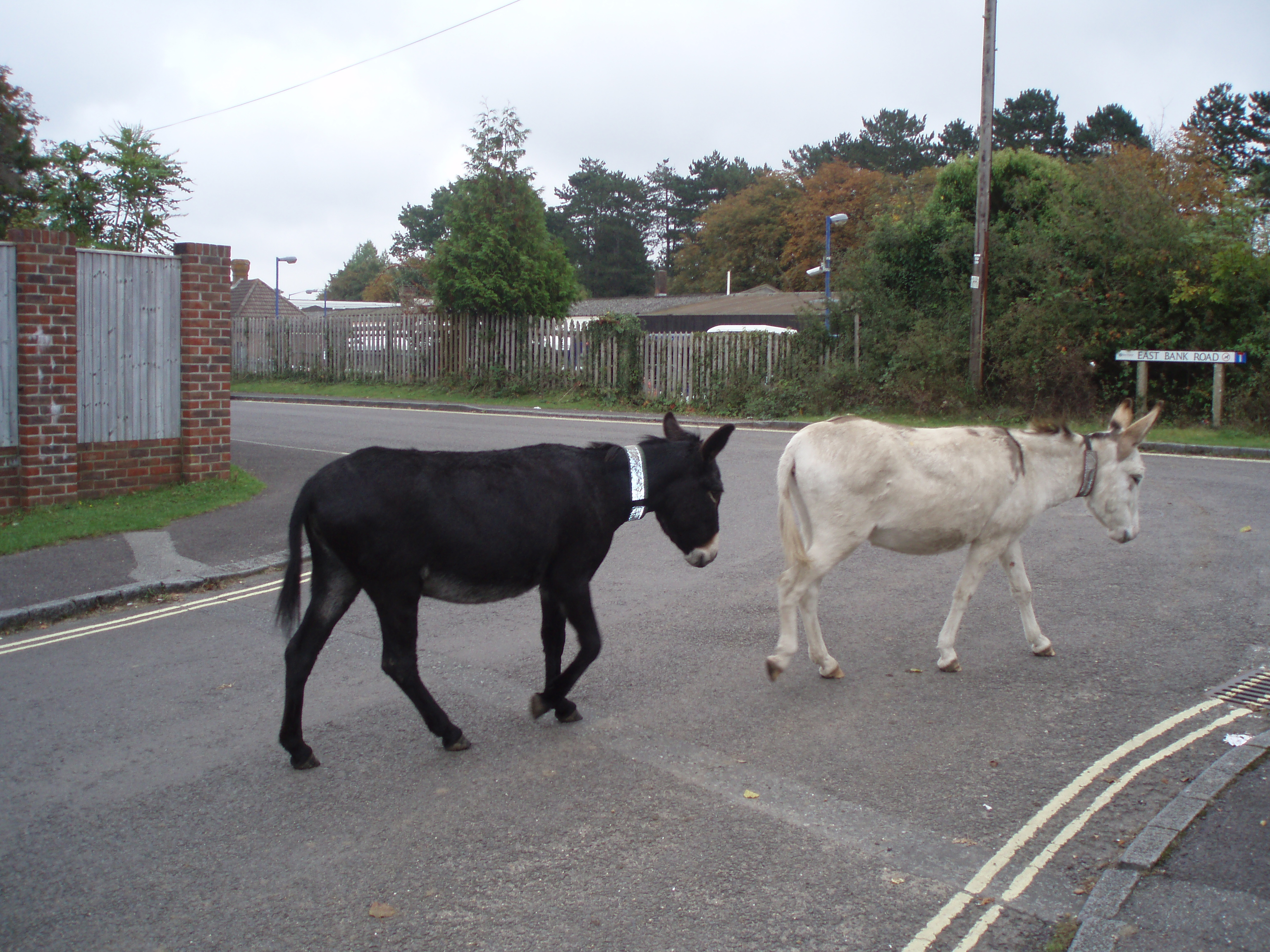
East Bank Road

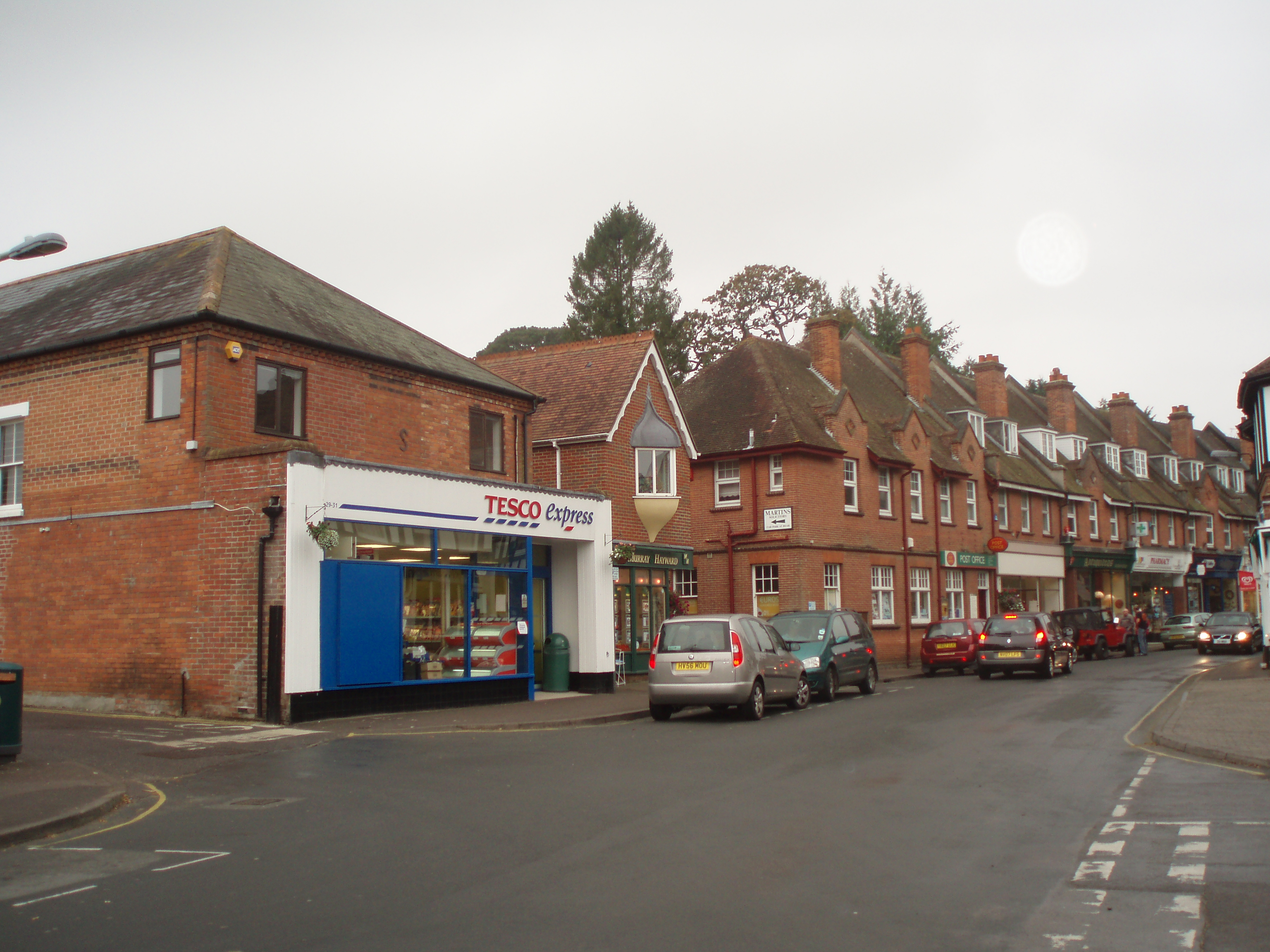
Brookley Road
